= List of elections in Massachusetts =

This is an incomplete list of elections in the Commonwealth of Massachusetts sorted both by offices sought and by years held.

Elections are administered by the individual municipalities. There is some oversight by the Secretary of the Commonwealth and the Office of Campaign and Political Finance.

Individual elections are listed with the winner.

== General ==
- November 5, 1861
- November 4, 1862
- November 3, 1863
- November 8, 1864
- November 7, 1865
- November 6, 1866
- November 5, 1867
- November 3, 1868
- November 2, 1869
- November 8, 1870
- November 7, 1871
- November 5, 1872
- November 4, 1873
- November 3, 1874
- November 2, 1875
- November 7, 1876
- November 6, 1877
- November 5, 1878
- November 4, 1879
- November 2, 1880
- November 8, 1881
- November 7, 1882
- November 6, 1883
- November 4, 1884
- November 3, 1885
- November 2, 1886
- November 8, 1887
- November 6, 1888
- November 5, 1889
- November 4, 1890
- November 3, 1891
- November 8, 1892
- November 7, 1893
- November 6, 1894
- November 5, 1895
- November 3, 1896
- November 2, 1897
- November 8, 1898
- November 7, 1899
- November 6, 1900
- November 5, 1901
- November 4, 1902
- November 3, 1903
- November 8, 1904
- November 7, 1905
- November 6, 1906
- November 5, 1907
- November 3, 1908
- November 2, 1909
- November 8, 1910
- November 7, 1911
- November 5, 1912
- November 4, 1913
- November 3, 1914
- November 6, 1917
- 1919, November 4
- 1920, November 2
- 1922, November 7
- 1924, November 4
- 1926 Massachusetts general election, November 2, 1926
- 1928 Massachusetts general election, November 6, 1928
- 1930 Massachusetts general election, November 4, 1930
- 1932 Massachusetts general election, November 8, 1932
- 1934 Massachusetts general election, November 6, 1934
- 1936 Massachusetts general election, November 3, 1936
- 1938 Massachusetts general election, November 8, 1938
- 1940 Massachusetts general election, November 5, 1940
- 1942 Massachusetts general election
- 1944 Massachusetts general election
- 1946 Massachusetts general election
- 1948 Massachusetts general election
- 1950 Massachusetts general election
- 1952 Massachusetts general election
- 1954 Massachusetts general election
- 1956 Massachusetts general election
- 1958 Massachusetts general election
- 1960 Massachusetts general election
- 1962 Massachusetts general election
- 1964 Massachusetts general election
- 1966 Massachusetts general election
- 1970 Massachusetts general election
- 1974 Massachusetts general election
- 1978 Massachusetts general election
- 1982 Massachusetts general election
- 1986 Massachusetts general election
- 1990 Massachusetts general election
- 1994 Massachusetts general election
- 1998 Massachusetts general election
- 2000 Massachusetts general election
- 2002 Massachusetts general election
- 2004 Massachusetts general election
- 2006 Massachusetts general election
- 2008 Massachusetts general election
- 2010 Massachusetts general election
- 2012 Massachusetts general election
- 2014 Massachusetts general election
- 2016 Massachusetts general election
- 2018 Massachusetts general election
- 2020 Massachusetts general election
- 2022 Massachusetts general election
- 2024 Massachusetts general election

== State elections ==
=== Governor ===
- ...
- 1839 Massachusetts gubernatorial election (Morton)
- 1840 Massachusetts gubernatorial election (Davis)
- 1841 Massachusetts gubernatorial election (Davis)
- 1842 Massachusetts gubernatorial election (Morton)
- 1843 Massachusetts gubernatorial election (Briggs)
- 1844 Massachusetts gubernatorial election (Briggs)
- 1845 Massachusetts gubernatorial election (Briggs)
- 1846 Massachusetts gubernatorial election (Briggs)
- 1847 Massachusetts gubernatorial election (Briggs)
- 1848 Massachusetts gubernatorial election (Briggs)
- 1849 Massachusetts gubernatorial election (Briggs)
- 1850 Massachusetts gubernatorial election (Boutwell)
- 1851 Massachusetts gubernatorial election (Boutwell)
- 1852 Massachusetts gubernatorial election (Clifford)
- 1853 Massachusetts gubernatorial election (E. Washburn)
- 1854 Massachusetts gubernatorial election (Gardner)
- 1855 Massachusetts gubernatorial election (Gardner)
- 1856 Massachusetts gubernatorial election (Gardner)
- 1857 Massachusetts gubernatorial election (Banks)
- 1858 Massachusetts gubernatorial election (Banks)
- 1859 Massachusetts gubernatorial election (Banks)
- 1860 Massachusetts gubernatorial election (Andrew)
- 1861 Massachusetts gubernatorial election (Andrew)
- 1862 Massachusetts gubernatorial election (Andrew)
- 1863 Massachusetts gubernatorial election (Andrew)
- 1864 Massachusetts gubernatorial election (Andrew)
- 1865 Massachusetts gubernatorial election (Bullock)
- 1866 Massachusetts gubernatorial election (Bullock)
- 1867 Massachusetts gubernatorial election (Bullock)
- 1868 Massachusetts gubernatorial election (Claflin)
- 1869 Massachusetts gubernatorial election (Claflin)
- 1870 Massachusetts gubernatorial election (Claflin)
- 1871 Massachusetts gubernatorial election (W. Washburn)
- 1872 Massachusetts gubernatorial election (W. Washburn)
- 1873 Massachusetts gubernatorial election (W. Washburn)
- 1874 Massachusetts gubernatorial election (Gaston)
- 1875 Massachusetts gubernatorial election (Rice)
- 1876 Massachusetts gubernatorial election (Rice)
- 1877 Massachusetts gubernatorial election (Rice)
- 1878 Massachusetts gubernatorial election (Talbot)
- 1879 Massachusetts gubernatorial election (Long)
- 1880 Massachusetts gubernatorial election (Long)
- 1881 Massachusetts gubernatorial election (Long)
- 1882 Massachusetts gubernatorial election (Butler)
- 1883 Massachusetts gubernatorial election (Robinson)
- 1884 Massachusetts gubernatorial election (Robinson)
- 1885 Massachusetts gubernatorial election (Robinson)
- 1886 Massachusetts gubernatorial election (Ames)
- 1887 Massachusetts gubernatorial election (Ames)
- 1888 Massachusetts gubernatorial election (Ames)
- 1889 Massachusetts gubernatorial election (Brackett)
- 1890 Massachusetts gubernatorial election (Russell)
- 1891 Massachusetts gubernatorial election (Russell)
- 1892 Massachusetts gubernatorial election (Russell)
- 1893 Massachusetts gubernatorial election (Greenhalge)
- 1894 Massachusetts gubernatorial election (Greenhalge)
- 1895 Massachusetts gubernatorial election (Greenhalge)
- 1896 Massachusetts gubernatorial election (Wolcott)
- 1897 Massachusetts gubernatorial election (Wolcott)
- 1898 Massachusetts gubernatorial election (Wolcott)
- 1899 Massachusetts gubernatorial election (Crane)
- 1900 Massachusetts gubernatorial election (Crane)
- 1901 Massachusetts gubernatorial election (Crane)
- 1902 Massachusetts gubernatorial election (Bates)
- 1903 Massachusetts gubernatorial election (Bates)
- 1904 Massachusetts gubernatorial election (Douglas)
- 1905 Massachusetts gubernatorial election (Guild)
- 1906 Massachusetts gubernatorial election (Guild)
- 1907 Massachusetts gubernatorial election (Guild)
- 1908 Massachusetts gubernatorial election (Draper)
- 1909 Massachusetts gubernatorial election (Draper)
- 1910 Massachusetts gubernatorial election (Foss)
- 1911 Massachusetts gubernatorial election (Foss)
- 1912 Massachusetts gubernatorial election (Foss)
- 1913 Massachusetts gubernatorial election (Walsh)
- 1914 Massachusetts gubernatorial election (Walsh)
- 1915 Massachusetts gubernatorial election (McCall)
- 1916 Massachusetts gubernatorial election (McCall)
- 1917 Massachusetts gubernatorial election (McCall)
- 1918 Massachusetts gubernatorial election (Coolidge)
- 1919 Massachusetts gubernatorial election (Coolidge)

Two-year terms, starting in 1920:

- 1920 Massachusetts gubernatorial election (Cox)
- 1922 Massachusetts gubernatorial election (Cox)
- 1924 Massachusetts gubernatorial election (Fuller)
- 1926 Massachusetts gubernatorial election (Fuller)
- 1928 Massachusetts gubernatorial election (Allen)
- 1930 Massachusetts gubernatorial election (Ely)
- 1932 Massachusetts gubernatorial election (Ely)
- 1934 Massachusetts gubernatorial election (Curley)
- 1936 Massachusetts gubernatorial election (Hurley)
- 1938 Massachusetts gubernatorial election (Saltonstall)
- 1940 Massachusetts gubernatorial election (Saltonstall)
- 1942 Massachusetts gubernatorial election (Saltonstall)
- 1944 Massachusetts gubernatorial election (Tobin)
- 1946 Massachusetts gubernatorial election (Bradford)
- 1948 Massachusetts gubernatorial election (Dever)
- 1950 Massachusetts gubernatorial election (Dever)
- 1952 Massachusetts gubernatorial election (Herter)
- 1954 Massachusetts gubernatorial election (Herter)
- 1956 Massachusetts gubernatorial election (Furcolo)
- 1958 Massachusetts gubernatorial election (Furcolo)
- 1960 Massachusetts gubernatorial election (Volpe)
- 1962 Massachusetts gubernatorial election (Peabody)
- 1964 Massachusetts gubernatorial election (Volpe)

Four-year terms, starting in 1966:

- 1966 Massachusetts gubernatorial election (Volpe)
- 1970 Massachusetts gubernatorial election (Sargent)
- 1974 Massachusetts gubernatorial election (Dukakis)
- 1978 Massachusetts gubernatorial election (King)
- 1982 Massachusetts gubernatorial election (Dukakis)
- 1986 Massachusetts gubernatorial election (Dukakis)
- 1990 Massachusetts gubernatorial election (Weld)
- 1994 Massachusetts gubernatorial election (Weld)
- 1998 Massachusetts gubernatorial election (Cellucci)
- 2002 Massachusetts gubernatorial election (Romney)
- 2006 Massachusetts gubernatorial election (Patrick)
- 2010 Massachusetts gubernatorial election (Patrick)
- 2014 Massachusetts gubernatorial election (Baker)
- 2018 Massachusetts gubernatorial election (Baker)
- 2022 Massachusetts gubernatorial election (Healey)
- 2026 Massachusetts gubernatorial election

=== Massachusetts Senate ===
- ...
- 2002 Massachusetts Senate elections
- 2004 Massachusetts Senate elections
- 2006 Massachusetts Senate elections
- 2008 Massachusetts Senate elections
- 2010 Massachusetts Senate elections
- 2012 Massachusetts Senate elections
- 2014 Massachusetts Senate elections
- 2016 Massachusetts Senate elections
- 2018 Massachusetts Senate elections
- 2020 Massachusetts Senate elections
- 2022 Massachusetts Senate elections
- 2024 Massachusetts Senate election

=== Massachusetts House of Representatives ===
- ...
- 2002 Massachusetts House of Representatives elections
- 2004 Massachusetts House of Representatives elections
- 2006 Massachusetts House of Representatives elections
- 2008 Massachusetts House of Representatives elections
- 2010 Massachusetts House of Representatives elections
- 2012 Massachusetts House of Representatives elections
- 2014 Massachusetts House of Representatives elections
- 2016 Massachusetts House of Representatives elections
- 2018 Massachusetts House of Representatives elections
- 2020 Massachusetts House of Representatives elections
- 2022 Massachusetts House of Representatives elections
- 2024 Massachusetts House of Representatives elections

=== Governor's Council ===
- ...
- 2002 Massachusetts Governor's Council elections
- 2004 Massachusetts Governor's Council elections
- 2006 Massachusetts Governor's Council elections
- 2008 Massachusetts Governor's Council elections
- 2010 Massachusetts Governor's Council elections
- 2012 Massachusetts Governor's Council elections
- 2014 Massachusetts Governor's Council elections
- 2016 Massachusetts Governor's Council elections
- 2018 Massachusetts Governor's Council elections
- 2020 Massachusetts Governor's Council elections
- 2022 Massachusetts Governor's Council elections
- 2024 Massachusetts Governor's Council elections

=== Ballot questions ===
- Massachusetts ballot measures, 1980:
  - 1. ✓ Prohibit discrimination against handicapped persons
  - 2. ✓ Proposition 2½
  - 3. ✗ Limiting state and local taxes; increase state share of education costs
  - 4. ✓ Increase salaries of certain state officials
  - 5. ✓ Restrict state authority to place certain costs on cities and towns
  - 6. ✗ Change legislative voting procedure for emergency laws
- Massachusetts ballot measures, 2002:
  - 1. ✗ Eliminating State Personal Income Tax
  - 2. ✓ Massachusetts English Language Education in Public Schools Initiative
  - 3. ✗ Taxpayer Funding for Political Campaigns
- Massachusetts ballot measures, 2006:
  - 1. ✗ Sale of Wine by Food Stores
  - 2. ✗ Nomination of Candidates for Public Office
  - 3. ✗ Family Child Care Providers
- Massachusetts ballot measures, 2008:
  - 1. ✗ Massachusetts State Income Tax Repeal
  - 2. ✓ Massachusetts Sensible Marijuana Policy
  - 3. ✓ Massachusetts Greyhound Protection Act
- Massachusetts ballot measures, 2010:
  - 1. ✓ Massachusetts No Sales Tax for Alcohol Initiative
  - 2. ✗ Massachusetts Comprehensive Permits and Regional Planning Initiative
  - 3. ✗ Massachusetts Sales Tax Relief Act
- Massachusetts ballot measures, 2012:
  - 1. ✓ Massachusetts Right to Repair Initiative
  - 2. ✗ Massachusetts Death with Dignity Initiative
  - 3. ✓ Massachusetts Medical Marijuana Initiative
- Massachusetts ballot measures, 2014:
  - 1. ✓ Massachusetts Automatic Gas Tax Increase Repeal Initiative
  - 2. ✗ Massachusetts Expansion of Bottle Deposits Initiative
  - 3. ✗ Massachusetts Casino Repeal Initiative
  - 4. ✓ Massachusetts Paid Sick Days Initiative
- Massachusetts ballot measures, 2016:
  - 1. ✗ Massachusetts Expand Slot Machine Gaming Initiative
  - 2. ✗ Massachusetts Charter School Expansion Initiative
  - 3. ✓ Massachusetts Conditions for Farm Animals Initiative
  - 4. ✓ Massachusetts Legalization, Regulation and Taxation of Marijuana Initiative
- Massachusetts ballot measures, 2018:
  - 1. ✗ Nurse-Patient Assignment Limits
  - 2. ✓ Advisory Commission for Amendments to the U.S. Constitution Regarding Corporate Personhood and Political Spending
  - 3. ✓ Massachusetts Gender Identity Anti-Discrimination Initiative
- Massachusetts ballot measures, 2020:
  - 1. ✓ Enhance, Update and Protect the 2013 Motor Vehicle Right to Repair Law Initiative
  - 2. ✗ Implement Ranked-Choice Voting in Elections Initiative
- Massachusetts ballot measures, 2022:
  - 1. ✓ Additional Tax on Income Over One Million
  - 2. ✓ Regulation of Dental Insurance
  - 3. ✗ Expanded Availability of Licenses for the Sale of Alcoholic Beverages
  - 4. ✓ Eligibility for Driver's Licenses
- Massachusetts ballot measures, 2024:
  - 1. ✓ State Auditor's Authority to Audit the Legislature
  - 2. ✓ Elimination of MCAS as High School Graduation Requirement
  - 3. ✓ Unionization for Transportation Network Drivers
  - 4. ✗ Limited Legalization and Regulation of Certain Natural Psychedelic Substances
  - 5. ✗ Minimum Wage for Tipped Workers

== Local elections ==
=== Boston mayoral elections ===
One-year terms (from 1822):

- 1894 Boston mayoral election (Curtis)

Two-year terms:

- 1895 Boston mayoral election (Quincy)
- 1897 Boston mayoral election (Quincy)
- 1899 Boston mayoral election (Hart)
- 1901 Boston mayoral election (P. Collins)
- 1903 Boston mayoral election (P. Collins)
- 1905 Boston mayoral election (Fitzgerald)
- 1907 Boston mayoral election (Hibbard)

Four-year terms, starting in 1910:

- 1910 Boston mayoral election (Fitzgerald)
- 1914 Boston mayoral election (Curley)
- 1917 Boston mayoral election (Peters)
- 1921 Boston mayoral election (Curley)
- 1925 Boston mayoral election (Nichols)
- 1929 Boston mayoral election (Curley)
- 1933 Boston mayoral election (Mansfield)
- 1937 Boston mayoral election (Tobin)
- 1941 Boston mayoral election (Tobin)
- 1945 Boston mayoral election (Curley)
- 1949 Boston mayoral election (Hynes)
- 1951 Boston mayoral election (Hynes)
- 1955 Boston mayoral election (Hynes)
- 1959 Boston mayoral election (J. Collins)
- 1963 Boston mayoral election (J. Collins)
- 1967 Boston mayoral election (White)
- 1971 Boston mayoral election (White)
- 1975 Boston mayoral election (White)
- 1979 Boston mayoral election (White)
- 1983 Boston mayoral election (Flynn)
- 1987 Boston mayoral election (Flynn)
- 1991 Boston mayoral election (Flynn)
- 1993 Boston mayoral election (Menino)
- 1997 Boston mayoral election (Menino)
- 2001 Boston mayoral election (Menino)
- 2005 Boston mayoral election (Menino)
- 2009 Boston mayoral election (Menino)
- 2013 Boston mayoral election (Walsh)
- 2017 Boston mayoral election (Walsh)
- 2021 Boston mayoral election (Wu)
- 2025 Boston mayoral election

=== Boston City Council elections ===
- 1983 Boston City Council election
- 1985 Boston City Council election
- 1987 Boston City Council election
- 1989 Boston City Council election
- 1991 Boston City Council election
- 1993 Boston City Council election
- 1995 Boston City Council election
- 1997 Boston City Council election
- 1999 Boston City Council election
- 2001 Boston City Council election
- 2003 Boston City Council election
- 2005 Boston City Council election
- 2007 Boston City Council election
- 2009 Boston City Council election
- 2011 Boston City Council election
- 2013 Boston City Council election
- 2015 Boston City Council election
- 2017 Boston City Council election
- 2019 Boston City Council election
- 2021 Boston City Council election
- 2025 Boston City Council election

=== Other ===
- 2013 Cambridge, Massachusetts municipal election

== National elections ==
=== United States president ===
- ...
- 1992 United States presidential election in Massachusetts (Clinton won both state and the election)
- 1996 United States presidential election in Massachusetts (Clinton won both state and the election)
- 2000 United States presidential election in Massachusetts (Gore won state; G. W. Bush won election)
- 2004 United States presidential election in Massachusetts (Kerry won state; G. W. Bush won election)
- 2008 United States presidential election in Massachusetts (Obama won both the state and the election)
- 2012 United States presidential election in Massachusetts (Obama won both the state and the election)
- 2016 United States presidential election in Massachusetts (Clinton won state; Trump won election)
- 2020 United States presidential election in Massachusetts (Biden won both the state and the election)

=== United States Senate ===
(With winners)

Class 1	Class 2	No regular election
...; 1905: Lodge Sr.; 1911: Lodge Sr.; 1916: Lodge Sr.; 1922: Lodge Sr.; 1926 [sp]: Walsh; 1928: Walsh; 1934: Walsh; 1940: Walsh; 1946: Lodge Jr.; 1952: J. Kennedy; 1958: J. Kennedy; 1962 [sp]: T. Kennedy; 1964: T. Kennedy; 1970: T. Kennedy; 1976: T. Kennedy; 1982: T. Kennedy; 1988: T. Kennedy; 1994: T. Kennedy; 2000: T. Kennedy; 2006: T. Kennedy; 2010 [sp]: Brown; 2012: Warren; 2018: Warren; 2024: Warren	...; 1907: Crane; 1913: Weeks; 1918: Walsh; 1924: Gillett; 1930: Coolidge; 1936: Lodge Jr.; 1942: Lodge Jr.; 1944 [sp]: Saltonstall; 1948: Saltonstall; 1954: Saltonstall; 1960: Saltonstall; 1966: Brooke; 1972: Brooke; 1978: Tsongas; 1984: Kerry; 1990: Kerry; 1996: Kerry; 2002: Kerry; 2008: Kerry; 2013 [sp]: Markey; 2014: Markey; 2020: Markey	...; 1908/9; 1914/5; 1920; 1926; 1932; 1938; 1944; 1950; 1956; 1962; 1968; 1974; 1980; 1986; 1992; 1998; 2004; 2010; 2016; 2022; 2026

=== United States House of Representatives ===
- 1788–1789 United States House of Representatives elections in Massachusetts
- 1790–1792 United States House of Representatives elections in Massachusetts
- 1792–1793 United States House of Representatives elections in Massachusetts
- 1794–1795 United States House of Representatives elections in Massachusetts
- 1796–1797 United States House of Representatives elections in Massachusetts
  - 1796 Massachusetts's 1st congressional district special election (Thomson J. Skinner)
  - 1796 Massachusetts's 10th congressional district special election (Samuel Sewall)
  - 1797 Massachusetts's 11th congressional district special election (Bailey Bartlett)
- 1798–1799 United States House of Representatives elections in Massachusetts
- 1800–1801 United States House of Representatives elections in Massachusetts
  - 1800 Massachusetts's 3rd congressional district special election (Ebenezer Mattoon)
  - 1800 Massachusetts's 4th congressional district special election (Levi Lincoln Sr.)
  - 1800 Massachusetts's 10th congressional district special election (Nathan Read)
  - 1801 Massachusetts's 4th congressional district special election (Seth Hastings)
  - 1801–1802 Massachusetts's 12th congressional district special election (Samuel Thatcher)
  - 1801 Massachusetts's 14th congressional district special election (Richard Cutts)
- 1802–1803 United States House of Representatives elections in Massachusetts
- 1804 United States House of Representatives elections in Massachusetts
  - 1804 Massachusetts's 12th congressional district special election (Simon Larned)
- 1806 United States House of Representatives elections in Massachusetts
  - 1807 Massachusetts's 12th congressional district special election (Ezekiel Bacon)
- 1808 United States House of Representatives elections in Massachusetts
  - 1808 Massachusetts's 2nd congressional district special election (Joseph Story)
- 1810–1811 United States House of Representatives elections in Massachusetts
  - 1810 Massachusetts's 10th congressional district special election (Joseph Allen)
  - 1810 Massachusetts's 11th congressional district special election (Abijah Bigelow)
  - 1811 Massachusetts's 4th congressional district special election (William M. Richardson)
- 1812–1813 United States House of Representatives elections in Massachusetts
  - 1812 Massachusetts's 17th congressional district special election (Francis Carr)
- 1814–1815 United States House of Representatives elections in Massachusetts
  - 1814 Massachusetts's 4th congressional district special election (Samuel Dana)
  - 1814 Massachusetts's 12th congressional district special election (John W. Hulbert)
- 1816–1817 United States House of Representatives elections in Massachusetts
  - 1816 Massachusetts's 11th congressional district special election (Benjamin Adams)
  - 1817 Massachusetts's 1st congressional district special election (Jonathan Mason)
- 1818–1819 United States House of Representatives elections in Massachusetts
  - 1818 Massachusetts's 20th congressional district special election (Enoch Lincoln)
- 1820–1821 United States House of Representatives elections in Massachusetts
  - 1820 Massachusetts's 1st congressional district special election (Benjamin Gorham)
  - 1820 Massachusetts's 8th congressional district special election (Aaron Hobart)
  - 1820 Massachusetts's 13th congressional district special election (William Eustis)
- 1822–1823 United States House of Representatives elections in Massachusetts
- 1824–1825 United States House of Representatives elections in Massachusetts
  - 1824 Massachusetts's 10th congressional district special election (John Bailey)
- 1826–1827 United States House of Representatives elections in Massachusetts
  - 1827 Massachusetts's 1st congressional district special election (Benjamin Gorham)
- 1828 United States House of Representatives elections in Massachusetts
- 1830–1832 United States House of Representatives elections in Massachusetts
- 1833–1834 United States House of Representatives elections in Massachusetts
- 1834–1835 United States House of Representatives elections in Massachusetts
  - 1834 Massachusetts's 2nd congressional district special election (Stephen C. Phillips)
  - 1834 Massachusetts's 5th congressional district special election (Levi Lincoln Jr.)
- 1836 United States House of Representatives elections in Massachusetts
- 1838–1839 United States House of Representatives elections in Massachusetts
  - 1838 Massachusetts's 2nd congressional district special election (Leverett Saltonstall)
- 1839
  - 1839 Massachusetts's 6th congressional district special election (Osmyn Baker)
- 1840–1841 United States House of Representatives elections in Massachusetts
  - 1840 Massachusetts's 1st congressional district special election (Robert C. Winthrop)
  - 1841 Massachusetts's 5th congressional district special election (Charles Hudson)
- 1842–1844 United States House of Representatives elections in Massachusetts
  - June 1842 Massachusetts's 1st congressional district special election (Nathan Appleton)
  - November 1842 Massachusetts's 1st congressional district special election (Robert C. Winthrop)
  - 1843 Massachusetts's 10th congressional district special election (Joseph Grinnell)
- 1844–1846 United States House of Representatives elections in Massachusetts
- 1846 United States House of Representatives elections in Massachusetts
- 1848–1850 United States House of Representatives elections in Massachusetts
  - 1848 Massachusetts's 8th congressional district special election (Horace Mann)
- 1850–1851 United States House of Representatives elections in Massachusetts
  - 1850 Massachusetts's 1st congressional district special election (Samuel A. Eliot)
- 1852 United States House of Representatives elections in Massachusetts
  - 1852 Massachusetts's 2nd congressional district special election (Francis B. Fay)
  - 1852 Massachusetts's 3rd congressional district special election (Lorenzo Sabine)
  - 1852 Massachusetts's 9th congressional district special election (Edward P. Little)
- 1854 United States House of Representatives elections in Massachusetts
  - 1854 Massachusetts's 1st congressional district special election (Thomas D. Eliot)
- 1856 United States House of Representatives elections in Massachusetts
- 1858 United States House of Representatives elections in Massachusetts
  - 1858 Massachusetts's 7th congressional district special election (Daniel W. Gooch)
- 1860 United States House of Representatives elections in Massachusetts
  - 1861 Massachusetts's 5th congressional district special election (Samuel Hooper)
- 1862 United States House of Representatives elections in Massachusetts
  - 1862 Massachusetts's 9th congressional district special election (Amasa Walker)
- 1864 United States House of Representatives elections in Massachusetts
  - 1865 Massachusetts's 6th congressional district special election (Nathaniel P. Banks)
- 1866 United States House of Representatives elections in Massachusetts
- 1868 United States House of Representatives elections in Massachusetts
  - 1869 Massachusetts's 7th congressional district special election (George M. Brooks)
- 1870 United States House of Representatives elections in Massachusetts
- 1872 United States House of Representatives elections in Massachusetts
  - 1872 Massachusetts's 7th congressional district special election (Constantine C. Esty)
  - 1872 Massachusetts's 9th congressional district special election (Alvah Crocker)
  - 1873 Massachusetts's 3rd congressional district special election (Henry L. Pierce)
- 1874 United States House of Representatives elections in Massachusetts
  - 1875 Massachusetts's 10th congressional district special election (Julius H. Seelye)
  - 1875 Massachusetts's 1st congressional district special election (William W. Crapo)
- 1876 United States House of Representatives elections in Massachusetts
  - 1876 Massachusetts's 3rd congressional district special election (Josiah G. Abbott)
- 1878 United States House of Representatives elections in Massachusetts
- 1880 United States House of Representatives elections in Massachusetts
- 1882 United States House of Representatives elections in Massachusetts
- 1884 United States House of Representatives elections in Massachusetts
  - 1884 Massachusetts's 12th congressional district special election (Francis W. Rockwell)
- 1886 United States House of Representatives elections in Massachusetts
- 1888 United States House of Representatives elections in Massachusetts
- 1890 United States House of Representatives elections in Massachusetts
- 1892 United States House of Representatives elections in Massachusetts
  - 1893 Massachusetts's 7th congressional district special election (William Everett)
- 1894 United States House of Representatives elections in Massachusetts
  - 1895 Massachusetts's 6th congressional district special election (William H. Moody)
- 1896 United States House of Representatives elections in Massachusetts
  - 1897 Massachusetts's 1st congressional district special election (George P. Lawrence)
- 1898 United States House of Representatives elections in Massachusetts
  - 1898 Massachusetts's 13th congressional district special election (William S. Greene)
- 1900 United States House of Representatives elections in Massachusetts
- 1902 United States House of Representatives elections in Massachusetts
  - 1902 Massachusetts's 6th congressional district special election (Augustus P. Gardner)
- 1904 United States House of Representatives elections in Massachusetts
- 1906 United States House of Representatives elections in Massachusetts
  - 1906 Massachusetts's 3rd congressional district special election (Charles G. Washburn)
- 1908 United States House of Representatives elections in Massachusetts
- 1910 United States House of Representatives elections in Massachusetts
  - 1910 Massachusetts's 3rd congressional district special election (John J. Mitchell)
  - 1910 Massachusetts's 14th congressional district special election (Eugene Foss)
- 1912 United States House of Representatives elections in Massachusetts
  - 1913 Massachusetts's 3rd congressional district special election (Calvin Paige)
  - 1913 Massachusetts's 13th congressional district special election (John J. Mitchell)
- 1914 United States House of Representatives elections in Massachusetts
  - 1914 Massachusetts's 12th congressional district special election (James A. Gallivan)
- 1916 United States House of Representatives elections in Massachusetts
  - 1917 Massachusetts's 6th congressional district special election (Willfred W. Lufkin)
- 1918 United States House of Representatives elections in Massachusetts
- 1920 United States House of Representatives elections in Massachusetts
  - 1921 Massachusetts's 6th congressional district special election (Abram Andrew)
- 1922 United States House of Representatives elections in Massachusetts
  - 1922 Massachusetts's 16th congressional district special election (Charles L. Gifford)
- 1924 United States House of Representatives elections in Massachusetts
  - 1924 Massachusetts's 15th congressional district special election (Robert M. Leach)
  - 1925 Massachusetts's 2nd congressional district special election (Henry L. Bowles)
  - 1925 Massachusetts's 5th congressional district special election (Edith Nourse Rogers)
- 1926 United States House of Representatives elections in Massachusetts
  - 1926 Massachusetts's 8th congressional district special election (Frederick W. Dallinger)
- 1928 United States House of Representatives elections in Massachusetts
  - 1928 Massachusetts's 12th congressional district special election (John W. McCormack)
  - 1928 Massachusetts's 14th congressional district special election (Richard Wigglesworth)
- 1930 United States House of Representatives elections in Massachusetts
  - 1930 Massachusetts's 2nd congressional district special election (William J. Granfield)
- 1932 United States House of Representatives elections in Massachusetts
- 1934 United States House of Representatives elections in Massachusetts
- 1936 United States House of Representatives elections in Massachusetts
  - 1937 Massachusetts's 7th congressional district special election (Lawrence J. Connery)
  - 1937 Massachusetts's 11th congressional district special election (Thomas A. Flaherty)
- 1938 United States House of Representatives elections in Massachusetts
- 1940 United States House of Representatives elections in Massachusetts
  - 1941 Massachusetts's 7th congressional district special election (Thomas J. Lane)
- 1942 United States House of Representatives elections in Massachusetts
- 1944 United States House of Representatives elections in Massachusetts
- 1946 United States House of Representatives elections in Massachusetts
  - 1947 Massachusetts's 9th congressional district special election (Donald W. Nicholson)
- 1948 United States House of Representatives elections in Massachusetts
- 1950 United States House of Representatives elections in Massachusetts
  - 1950 Massachusetts's 6th congressional district special election (William H. Bates)
- 1952 United States House of Representatives elections in Massachusetts
- 1954 United States House of Representatives elections in Massachusetts
- 1956 United States House of Representatives elections in Massachusetts
- 1958 United States House of Representatives elections in Massachusetts
- 1960 United States House of Representatives elections in Massachusetts
- 1962 United States House of Representatives elections in Massachusetts
- 1964 United States House of Representatives elections in Massachusetts
- 1966 United States House of Representatives elections in Massachusetts
- 1968 United States House of Representatives elections in Massachusetts
  - 1969 Massachusetts's 6th congressional district special election (Michael J. Harrington)
- 1970 United States House of Representatives elections in Massachusetts
- 1972 United States House of Representatives elections in Massachusetts
- 1974 United States House of Representatives elections in Massachusetts
- 1976 United States House of Representatives elections in Massachusetts
  - 1976 Massachusetts's 7th congressional district special election (Ed Markey)
- 1978 United States House of Representatives elections in Massachusetts
- 1980 United States House of Representatives elections in Massachusetts
- 1982 United States House of Representatives elections in Massachusetts
- 1984 United States House of Representatives elections in Massachusetts
- 1986 United States House of Representatives elections in Massachusetts
- 1988 United States House of Representatives elections in Massachusetts
- 1990 United States House of Representatives elections in Massachusetts
  - 1991 Massachusetts's 1st congressional district special election (John Olver)
- 1992 United States House of Representatives elections in Massachusetts
- 1994 United States House of Representatives elections in Massachusetts
- 1996 United States House of Representatives elections in Massachusetts
- 1998 United States House of Representatives elections in Massachusetts
- 2000 United States House of Representatives elections in Massachusetts
  - 2001 Massachusetts's 9th congressional district special election (Stephen Lynch)
- 2002 United States House of Representatives elections in Massachusetts
- 2004 United States House of Representatives elections in Massachusetts
- 2006 United States House of Representatives elections in Massachusetts
  - 2007 Massachusetts's 5th congressional district special election (Nikki Tsongas)
- 2008 United States House of Representatives elections in Massachusetts
- 2010 United States House of Representatives elections in Massachusetts
- 2012 United States House of Representatives elections in Massachusetts
  - 2013 Massachusetts's 5th congressional district special election (Katherine Clark)
- 2014 United States House of Representatives elections in Massachusetts
- 2016 United States House of Representatives elections in Massachusetts
- 2018 United States House of Representatives elections in Massachusetts
- 2020 United States House of Representatives elections in Massachusetts
- 2022 United States House of Representatives elections in Massachusetts
- 2024 United States House of Representatives elections in Massachusetts
- 2026 United States House of Representatives elections in Massachusetts

== Elections by year ==
=== 1780s - 1790s ===
	Federal Elections			State Elections					Local Elections	Special Elections
	Presidential	Senate	House of Rep.	Governor	State Senate	State House of Reps	Governors Council	Ballot Measures		
1788	—	—	1788–1789 U.S. House	—	—	—	—	—	—	—
1789	—	—	1788–1789 U.S. House	—	—	—	—	—	—	—
1790	—	—	1790–1792 U.S. House 1792–1793 U.S. House	—	—	—	—	—	—	—
1791	—	—	1790–1792 U.S. House 1792–1793 U.S. House	—	—	—	—	—	—	—
1792	—	—	1790–1792 U.S. House 1792–1793 U.S. House	—	—	—	—	—	—	—
1793	—	—	1790–1792 U.S. House 1792–1793 U.S. House	—	—	—	—	—	—	—
1794	—	—	1794–1795 U.S. House	—	—	—	—	—	—	—
1795	—	—	1794–1795 U.S. House	—	—	—	—	—	—	—
1796	—	—	1796–1797 U.S. House	—	—	—	—	—	—	1796 1st congressional district special election; 1796 10th congressional district special election
1797	—	—	1796–1797 U.S. House	—	—	—	—	—	—	1797 11th congressional district special election
1798	—	—	1798–1799 U.S. House	—	—	—	—	—	—	—
1799	—	—	1798–1799 U.S. House	—	—	—	—	—	—	—

=== 1800s ===
	Federal Elections			State Elections					Local Elections	Special Elections
	Presidential	Senate	House of Rep.	Governor	State Senate	State House of Reps	Governors. Council	Ballot Measures		
1800	—	—	1800–1801 U.S. House	—	—	—	—	—	—	1800 3rd congressional district special election; 1800 4th congressional district special election; 1800 10th congressional district special election
1801	—	—	1800–1801 U.S. House	—	—	—	—	—	—	1801 4th congressional district special election; 1801 14th congressional district special election
1802	—	—	1802–1803 U.S. House	—	—	—	—	—	—	—
1803	—	—	1802–1803 U.S. House	—	—	—	—	—	—	—
1804	—	—	1804 U.S. House	—	—	—	—	—	—	1804 12th congressional district special election
1805	—	—	—	—	—	—	—	—	—	—
1806	—	—	1806 U.S. House	—	—	—	—	—	—	—
1807	—	—	—	—	—	—	—	—	—	1807 12th congressional district special election
1808	—	—	1808 U.S. House	—	—	—	—	—	—	1808 2nd congressional district special election
1809	—	—	—	—	—	—	—	—	—	—

=== 1810s ===
	General Election	Federal Elections			State Elections					Local Elections	Special Elections
		Presidential	Senate	House of Rep.	Governor	State Senate	State House of Reps	Governors. Council	Ballot Measures		
1810	—	—	—	1810–1811 U.S. House	—	—	—	—	—	—	1810 10th congressional district special election; 1810 11th congressional district special election
1811	—	—	—	1810–1811 U.S. House	—	—	—	—	—	—	1811 4th congressional district special election
1812	—	—	—	1812–1813 U.S. House	—	—	—	—	—	—	1812 17th congressional district special election
1813	—	—	—	1812–1813 U.S. House	—	—	—	—	—	—	—
1814	—	—	—	1814–1815 U.S. House	—	—	—	—	—	—	1814 4th congressional district special election; 1814 12th congressional district special election
1815	—	—	—	1814–1815 U.S. House	—	—	—	—	—	—	—
1816	—	—	—	1816–1817 U.S. House	—	—	—	—	—	—	1816 11th congressional district special election
1817	—	—	—	1816–1817 U.S. House	—	—	—	—	—	—	1817 1st congressional district special election
1818	—	—	—	1818–1819 U.S. House	—	—	—	—	—	—	1818 20th congressional district special election
1819	—	—	—	1818–1819 U.S. House	—	—	—	—	—	—	—

=== 1820s ===
	General Election	Federal Elections			State Elections					Local Elections	Special Elections
		Presidential	Senate	House of Rep.	Governor	State Senate	State House of Reps	Governors. Council	Ballot Measures		
1820	—	1820 Presidential	—	1820–1821 U.S. House	—	—	—	—	—	—	1820 1st congressional district special election; 1820 8th congressional district special election; 1820 13th congressional district special election
1821	—	—	—	1820–1821 U.S. House	—	—	—	—	—	—	—
1822	—	—	—	1822–1823 U.S. House	—	—	—	—	—	—	—
1823	—	—	—	1822–1823 U.S. House	—	—	—	—	—	—	—
1824	—	1824 Presidential	—	1824–1825 U.S. House	—	—	—	—	—	—	1824 10th congressional district special election
1825	—	—	—	1824–1825 U.S. House	—	—	—	—	—	—	—
1826	—	—	—	1826–1827 U.S. House	—	—	—	—	—	—	—
1827	—	—	—	1826–1827 U.S. House	—	—	—	—	—	—	1827 1st congressional district special election
1828	—	1828 Presidential	—	1828 U.S. House	—	—	—	—	—	—	—
1829	—	—	—	—	—	—	—	—	—	—	

=== 1830s ===
	General	Federal Elections			State Elections					Local Elections	Special Elections
		Presidential	Senate	House of Rep.	Governor	State Senate	State House of Reps	Governors. Council	Ballot Measures		
1830	—	—	—	1830 U.S. House	—	—	—	—	—	—	—
1831	—	—	—	—	—	—	—	—	—	—	—
1832	—	1832 Presidential	—	—	—	—	—	—	—	—	—
1833	—	—	—	—	—	—	—	—	—	—	—
1834	—	—	—	1834 U.S. House	—	—	—	—	—	—	1834 2nd congressional district special election; 1834 5th congressional district special election
1835	—	—	—	—	—	—	—	—	—	—	—
1836	—	1836 Presidential	—	1836 U.S. House	—	—	—	—	—	—	—
1837	—	—	—	—	—	—	—	—	—	—	—
1838	—	—	—	1838 U.S. House	—	—	—	—	—	—	1838 2nd congressional district special election
1839	—	—	—	—	1839 Gubernatorial	—	—	—	—	—	—

=== 1840s ===
	General	Federal Elections			State Elections					Local Elections	Special Elections
		Presidential	Senate	House of Rep.	Governor	State Senate	State House of Reps	Governors. Council	Ballot Measures		
1840	—	1840 Presidential	—	1840 U.S. House	—	—	—	—	—	—	1840 1st congressional district special election
1841	—	—	—	—	—	—	—	—	—	—	1841 5th congressional district special election
1842	—	—	—	1842 U.S. House	—	—	—	—	—	—	June 1842 1st congressional district special election; November 1842 1st congressional district special election
1843	—	—	—	—	—	—	—	—	—	—	1843 10th congressional district special election
1844	—	1844 Presidential	—	1844 U.S. House	—	—	—	—	—	—	—
1845	—	—	—	—	—	—	—	—	—	—	—
1846	—	—	—	1846 U.S. House	—	—	—	—	—	—	—
1847	—	—	—	—	—	—	—	—	—	—	—
1848	—	1848 Presidential	—	1848 U.S. House	—	—	—	—	—	—	1848 8th congressional district special election
1849	—	—	—	—	—	—	—	—	—	—	—

=== 1850s ===
	General	Federal Elections			State Elections					Local Elections	Special Elections
		Presidential	Senate	House of Rep.	Governor	State Senate	State House of Reps	Governors. Council	Ballot Measures		
1850	—	—	—	1850 U.S. House	—	—	—	—	—	—	1850 1st congressional district special election
1851	—	—	1851 U.S. Senate	—	—	—	—	—	—	—	—
1852	—	1852 Presidential	—	1852 U.S. House	—	—	—	—	—	—	1852 2nd congressional district special election; 1852 3rd congressional district special election; 1852 9th congressional district special election
1853	—	—	—	—	—	—	—	—	—	—	—
1854	—	—	—	1854 U.S. House	—	—	—	—	—	1854 Boston Mayoral	1854 1st congressional district special election
1855	—	—	—	—	—	—	—	—	—	1855 Boston Mayoral	—
1856	—	1856 Presidential	—	1856 U.S. House	—	—	—	—	—	1856 Boston Mayoral	—
1857	—	—	1857 U.S. Senate	—	—	—	—	—	—	1857 Boston Mayoral	—
1858	—	—	—	1858 U.S. House	—	—	—	—	—	1858 Boston Mayoral	1858 7th congressional district special election
1859	—	—	—	—	—	—	—	—	—	1859 Boston Mayoral	—

=== 1860s ===
	General	Federal Elections			State Elections					Local Elections	Special Elections
		Presidential	Senate	House of Rep.	Governor	State Senate	State House of Reps	Governors. Council	Ballot Measures		
1860	—	1860 Presidential	—	1860 U.S. House	—	—	—	—	—	1860 Boston Mayoral	—
1861	—	—	—	—	—	—	—	—	—	1861 Boston Mayoral	1861 5th congressional district special election
1862	—	—	—	1862 U.S. House	—	—	—	—	—	1862 Boston Mayoral	1862 9th congressional district special election
1863	—	—	1863 U.S. Senate	—	—	—	—	—	—	1863 Boston Mayoral	—
1864	—	1864 Presidential	—	1864 U.S. House	—	—	—	—	—	1864 Boston Mayoral	—
1865	—	—	—	—	—	—	—	—	—	1865 Boston Mayoral	1865 6th congressional district special election
1866	—	—	—	1866 U.S. House	—	—	—	—	—	1866 Boston Mayoral	—
1867	—	—	—	—	—	—	—	—	—	1867 Boston Mayoral	—
1868	—	1868 Presidential	—	1868 U.S. House	—	—	—	—	—	1868 Boston Mayoral	—
1869	—	—	1869 U.S. Senate	—	—	—	—	—	—	1869 Boston Mayoral	1869 7th congressional district special election

=== 1870s ===
	General	Federal Elections			State Elections					Local Elections	Special Elections
		Presidential	Senate	House of Rep.	Governor	State Senate	State House of Reps	Governors. Council	Ballot Measures		
1870	—	—	—	1870 U.S. House	—	—	—	—	—	1870 Boston Mayoral	—
1871	—	—	—	—	—	—	—	—	—	1871 Boston Mayoral	—
1872	—	1872 Presidential	—	1872 U.S. House	—	—	—	—	—	1872 Boston Mayoral	1872 7th congressional district special election; 1872 9th congressional district special election
1873	—	—	—	—	—	—	—	—	—	1873 Boston Mayoral	1873 3rd congressional district special election
1874	—	—	—	1874 U.S. House	—	—	—	—	—	1874 Boston Mayoral	—
1875	—	—	—	—	—	—	—	—	—	1875 Boston Mayoral	1875 1st congressional district special election; 1875 10th congressional district special election
1876	—	1876 Presidential	—	1876 U.S. House	1876 Gubernatorial	—	—	—	—	1876 Boston Mayoral	1876 3rd congressional district special election
1877	—	—	—	—	1877 Gubernatorial	—	—	—	—	1877 Boston Mayoral	—
1878	—	—	—	1878 U.S. House	1878 Gubernatorial	—	—	—	—	1878 Boston Mayoral	—
1879	—	—	—	—	1879 Gubernatorial	—	—	—	—	1879 Boston Mayoral	—

=== 1880s ===
	General	Federal Elections			State Elections					Local Elections	Special Elections
		Presidential	Senate	House of Rep.	Governor	State Senate	State House of Reps	Governors. Council	Ballot Measures		
1880	—	1880 Presidential	—	1880 U.S. House	1880 Gubernatorial	—	—	—	—	1880 Boston Mayoral	—
1881	—	—	—	—	1881 Gubernatorial	—	—	—	—	1881 Boston Mayoral	—
1882	—	—	—	1882 U.S. House	1882 Gubernatorial	—	—	—	—	1882 Boston Mayoral	—
1883	—	—	—	—	1883 Gubernatorial	—	—	—	—	1883 Boston Mayoral	—
1884	—	1884 Presidential	—	1884 U.S. House	—	—	—	—	—	1884 Boston Mayoral	1884 12th congressional district special election
1885	—	—	—	—	—	—	—	—	—	1885 Boston Mayoral	—
1886	—	—	—	1886 U.S. House	—	—	—	—	—	1886 Boston Mayoral	—
1887	—	—	—	—	—	—	—	—	—	1887 Boston Mayoral	—
1888	—	1888 Presidential	—	1888 U.S. House	—	—	—	—	—	1888 Boston Mayoral	—
1889	—	—	—	—	—	—	—	—	—	1889 Boston Mayoral	—

=== 1890s ===
	General	Federal Elections			State Elections					Local Elections	Special Elections
		Presidential	Senate	House of Rep.	Governor	State Senate	State House of Reps	Governors. Council	Ballot Measures		
1890	—	—	—	1890 U.S. House	—	—	—	—	—	1890 Boston Mayoral	—
1891	—	—	—	—	—	—	—	—	—	1891 Boston Mayoral	—
1892	—	1892 Presidential	—	1892 U.S. House	—	—	—	—	—	1892 Boston Mayoral	—
1893	—	—	—	—	—	—	—	—	—	1893 Boston Mayoral	1893 7th congressional district special election
1894	—	—	—	1894 U.S. House	—	—	—	—	—	1894 Boston Mayoral	—
1895	—	—	—	—	—	—	—	—	—	1895 Boston Mayoral	1895 6th congressional district special election
1896	—	1896 Presidential	—	1896 U.S. House	—	—	—	—	—	—	—
1897	—	—	—	—	—	—	—	—	—	1897 Boston Mayoral	1897 1st congressional district special election
1898	—	—	—	1898 U.S. House	—	—	—	—	—	—	1898 13th congressional district special election
1899	—	—	—	—	—	—	—	—	—	1899 Boston Mayoral	—

=== 1900s ===
	General Election	Federal Elections			State Elections					Local Elections	Special Elections
		Presidential	Senate	House of Rep.	Governor	State Senate	State House of Reps	Governors. Council	Ballot Measures		
1900	—	1900 Presidential	—	1900 U.S. House	—	—	—	—	—	—	—
1901	—	—	—	—	—	—	—	—	—	1901 Boston Mayoral	—
1902	—	—	—	1902 U.S. House	—	—	—	—	—	—	1902 6th congressional district special election
1903	—	—	—	—	—	—	—	—	—	1903 Boston Mayoral	—
1904	—	1904 Presidential	—	1904 U.S. House	—	—	—	—	—	—	—
1905	—	—	—	—	—	—	—	—	—	1905 Boston Mayoral	—
1906	—	—	—	1906 U.S. House	—	—	—	—	—	—	1906 3rd congressional district special election
1907	—	—	—	—	—	—	—	—	—	1907 Boston Mayoral	—
1908	—	1908 Presidential	—	1908 U.S. House	1908 Gubernatorial	—	—	—	—	—	—
1909	—	—	—	—	—	—	—	—	—	—	—

=== 1910s ===
	General Election	Federal Elections			State Elections					Local Elections	Special Elections
		Presidential	Senate	House of Rep.	Governor	State Senate	State House of Reps	Governors. Council	Ballot Measures		
1910	—	—	—	1910 U.S. House	1910 Gubernatorial	—	—	—	—	1910 Boston Mayoral	1910 3rd congressional district special election
1911	—	—	—	—	1911 Gubernatorial	—	—	—	—	—	—
1912	—	1912 Presidential	—	1912 U.S. House	1912 Gubernatorial	—	—	—	—	—	—
1913	—	—	1913 U.S. Senate	—	1913 Gubernatorial	—	—	—	—	—	1913 3rd congressional district special election; 1913 13th congressional district special election
1914	—	—	—	1914 U.S. House	1914 Gubernatorial	—	—	—	—	1914 Boston Mayoral	1914 12th congressional district special election
1915	—	—	—	—	1915 Gubernatorial	—	—	—	—	—	—
1916	—	1916 Presidential	1916 U.S. Senate	1916 U.S. House	1916 Gubernatorial	—	—	—	—	—	—
1917	—	—	—	—	1917 Gubernatorial	—	—	—	—	1917 Boston Mayoral	1917 6th congressional district special election
1918	—	—	1918 U.S. Senate	1918 U.S. House	1918 Gubernatorial	—	—	—	—	—	—
1919	—	—	—	—	1919 Gubernatorial	—	—	—	—	—	—

=== 1920s ===
	General Election	Federal Elections			State Elections					Local Elections	Special Elections
		Presidential	Senate	House of Rep.	Governor	State Senate	State House of Reps	Governors. Council	Ballot Measures		
1920	—	1920 Presidential	—	1920 U.S. House	1920 Gubernatorial	—	—	—	—	—	—
1921	—	—	—	—	—	—	—	—	—	1921 Boston Mayoral	1921 6th congressional district special election
1922	—	—	1922 U.S. Senate	1922 U.S. House	1922 Gubernatorial	—	—	—	—	—	1922 16th congressional district special election
1923	—	—	—	—	—	—	—	—	—	—	—
1924	—	1924 Presidential	1924 U.S. Senate	1924 U.S. House	1924 Gubernatorial	—	—	—	—	—	1925 2nd congressional district special election; 1925 5th congressional district special election; 1924 15th congressional district special election
1925	—	—	—	—	—	—	—	—	—	1925 Boston Mayoral	—
1926	—	—	—	1926 U.S. House	1926 Gubernatorial	—	—	—	—	—	1926 United States Senate special election; 1926 8th congressional district special election
1927	—	—	—	—	—	—	—	—	—	—	—
1928	—	1928 Presidential	1928 U.S. Senate	1928 U.S. House	1928 Gubernatorial	—	—	—	—	—	1928 12th congressional district special election; 1928 14th congressional district special election
1929	—	—	—	—	—	—	—	—	—	1929 Boston Mayoral	—

=== 1930s ===
	General Election	Federal Elections			State Elections					Local Elections	Special Elections
		Presidential	Senate	House of Rep.	Governor	State Senate	State House of Reps	Governors. Council	Ballot Measures		
1930	—	—	1930 U.S. Senate	1930 U.S. House	1930 Gubernatorial	—	—	—	—	—	1930 2nd congressional district special election
1931	—	—	—	—	—	—	—	—	—	—	—
1932	—	1932 Presidential	—	1932 U.S. House	1932 Gubernatorial	—	—	—	—	—	—
1933	—	—	—	—	—	—	—	—	—	1933 Boston Mayoral	—
1934	—	—	1934 U.S. Senate	1934 U.S. House	1934 Gubernatorial	—	—	—	—	—	—
1935	—	—	—	—	—	—	—	—	—	—	—
1936	—	1936 Presidential	1936 U.S. Senate	1936 U.S. House	1936 Gubernatorial	—	—	—	—	—	—
1937	—	—	—	—	—	—	—	—	—	1937 Boston Mayoral	1937 7th congressional district special election; 1937 11th congressional district special election
1938	—	—	—	1938 U.S. House	1938 Gubernatorial	—	—	—	—	—	—
1939	—	—	—	—	—	—	—	—	—	—	—

=== 1940s ===
	General Election	Federal Elections			State Elections					Local Elections	Special Elections
		Presidential	Senate	House of Rep.	Governor	State Senate	State House of Reps	Governors Council	Ballot Measures		
1940	—	1940 Presidential	1940 U.S. Senate	1940 U.S House	1940 Gubernatorial	—	—	—	—	—	—
1941	—	—	—	—	—	—	—	—	—	1941 Boston Mayoral	1941 7th congressional district special election
1942	—	—	1942 U.S. Senate	1942 U.S. House	1942 Gubernatorial	—	—	—	—	—	—
1943	—	—	—	—	—	—	—	—	—	—	—
1944	—	1944 Presidential	—	1944 U.S. House	1944 Gubernatorial	—	—	—	—	—	1944 U.S. Senate special election
1945	—	—	—	—	—	—	—	—	—	1945 Boston Mayoral	—
1946	1946 General		1946 U.S. Senate	1946 U.S. House	1946 Gubernatorial	—	—	—	—	—	—
1947	—	—	—	—	—	—	—	—	—	—	1947 9th congressional district special election
1948	1948 General	1948 Presidential	1948 U.S. Senate	1948 U.S. House	1948 Gubernatorial	—	—	—	—	—	—
1949	—	—	—	—	—	—	—	—	—	1949 Boston Mayoral	—

=== 1950s ===
	General Election	Federal Elections			State Elections					Local Elections	Special Elections
		Presidential	Senate	House of Rep.	Governor	State Senate	State House of Reps	Governors Council	Ballot Measures		
1950	1950 General	—	—	1950 U.S. House	1950 Gubernatorial	—	—	—	—	—	1950 6th congressional district special election
1951	—	—	—	—	—	—	—	—	—	1951 Boston Mayoral	—
1952	1952 General	1952 Presidential	1952 U.S. Senate	1952 U.S. House	1952 Gubernatorial	—	—	—	—	—	—
1953	—	—	—	—	—	—	—	—	—	—	—
1954	1954 General	—	1954 U.S. Senate	1954 U.S. House	1954 Gubernatorial	—	—	—	—	—	—
1955	—	—	—	—	—	—	—	—	—	1955 Boston Mayoral	—
1956	1956 General	1956 Presidential	—	1956 U.S. House	1956 Gubernatorial	—	—	—	—	—	—
1957	—	—	—	—	—	—	—	—	—	—	—
1958	1958 General	—	1958 U.S. Senate	1958 U.S. House	1958 Gubernatorial	—	—	—	—	—	—
1959	—	—	—	—	—	—	—	—	—	1959 Boston Mayoral	—

=== 1960s ===
	General Election	Federal Elections			State Elections					Local Elections	Special Elections
	General Election	Presidential	Senate	House of Rep.	Governor	State Senate	State House of Reps	Governors Council	Ballot Measures	Local Elections	Special Elections
1960	1960 General	1960 Presidential	1960 U.S. Senate		1960 Gubernatorial	—	—	—	—	—	—
1961	—	—	—	—	—	—	—	—	—	—	—
1962	1962 General	—	—		1962 Gubernatorial	—	—	—	—	—	1962 U.S. Senate special election
1963	—	—	—	—	—	—	—	—	—	1963 Boston Mayoral	—
1964	1964 General	1964 Presidential	1964 U.S. Senate		1964 Gubernatorial	—	—	—	—	—	—
1965	—	—	—	—	—	—	—	—	—	—	—
1966	1966 General	—	1966 U.S. Senate		—	—	—	—	—	—	
1967	—	—	—	—	—	—	—	—	—	1967 Boston Mayoral	
1968	1968 General	1968 Presidential	—	1968 U.S. House	—	—	—	—	—	—	1969 6th congressional district special election
1969	—	—	—	—	—	—	—	—	—	—	—

=== 1970s ===
	General Election	Federal Elections			State Elections					Local Elections	Special Elections
	General Election	Presidential	Senate	House of Reps.	Governor	State Senate	State House of Reps.	Governors Council	Ballot Measures	Local Elections	Special Elections
1970	1970 General		1970 U.S. Senate		1970 Gubernatorial						
1971										1971 Boston Mayoral	
1972	1972 General	1972 Presidential	1972 U.S Senate								
1973											
1974	1974 General			U.S. House	1974 Gubernatorial						
1975										1975 Boston Mayoral	
1976	1976 General	1976 Presidential	1976 U.S. Senate	1976 U.S. House of Reps							1976 7th congressional district special election
1977											
1978	1978 General		1978 U.S. Senate		1978 Gubernatorial						
1979										1979 Boston Mayoral	

=== 1980s ===
	General Election	Federal Elections			State Elections					Local Elections	Special Elections
	General Election	Presidential	Senate	House of Reps.	Governor	State Senate	State House of Reps.	Governors Council	Ballot Measures	Local Elections	Special Elections
1980	1980 General										
1981											
1982	1982 General		1982 U.S. Senate	1982 U.S. House	1982 Gubernatorial						
1983										1983 Boston Mayoral	
1984	1984 General		1984 U.S. Senate	1984 U.S. House							
1985											
1986	1986 General			1986 U.S. House	1986 Gubernatorial						
1987										1987 Boston Mayoral	
1988	1988 General		1988 U.S Senate	1988 U.S. House							
1989											

=== 1990s ===
	General Election	Federal Elections			State Elections					Local Elections	Special Elections
	General Election	Presidential	Senate	House of Rep.	Governor	State Senate	State House of Reps	Governors. Council	Ballot Measures		
1990	1990 General	—	1990 U.S. Senate	1990 U.S. House	1990 Gubernatorial	—	—	—	—	—	—
1991	—	—	—	—	—	—	—	—	—	1991 Boston Mayoral; 1991 Boston City Council	1991 1st congressional district special election
1992	1992 General	1992 Presidential	—	1992 U.S. House	—	—	—	—	—	—	—
1993	—	—	—	—	—	—	—	—	—	1993 Boston Mayoral; 1993 Boston City Council	—
1994	1994 General	—	1994 U.S. Senate	1994 U.S. House	1994 Gubernatorial	—	—	—	—	—	—
1995	—	—	—	—	—	—	—	—	—	1995 Boston City Council	—
1996	1996 General	1996 Presidential	1996 U.S. Senate	1996 U.S. House	—	—	—	—	—	—	—
1997	—	—	—	—	—	—	—	—	—	1997 Boston Mayoral; 1997 Boston City Council	—
1998	1998 General	—	—	1998 U.S. House	1998 Gubernatorial	—	—	—	—	—	—
1999	—	—	—	—	—	—	—	—	—	1999 Boston City Council	—

=== 2000s ===
	General	Federal Elections				State Elections					Local Elections	Special Elections
	General	Presidential		Senate	House of Rep.	Governor	State Senate	State House of Reps	Governors. Council	Ballot Measures	Local Elections	Special Elections
2000	2000 General		2000 Presidential	2000 U.S. Senate	2000 U.S. House	—	—	—	—	—	—	—
2001	—	—		—	—	—	—	—	—	—	2001 Boston Mayoral; 2001 Boston City Council; 2001 Worcester Mayoral	2001 9th congressional district special election
2002	2002 General	—		2002 U.S. Senate	2002 U.S. House	2002 Gubernatorial	2002 State Senate	2002 State House	2002 Governor's Council	2002 Ballot Measures	—	—
2003	—	—		—	—	—	—	—	—	—	2003 Boston City Council; 2003 Worcester Mayoral	—
2004	2004 General		2004 Presidential	—	2004 U.S. House	—	2004 State Senate	2004 State House	2004 Governor's Council	—	—	—
2005	—	—		—	—	—	—	—	—	—	2005 Boston Mayoral; 2005 Boston City Council; 2005 Worcester Mayoral	—
2006	2006 General	—		2006 U.S. Senate	2006 U.S. House	2006 Gubernatorial	2006 State Senate	2006 State House	2006 Governor's Council	2006 Ballot Measures	—	—
2007	—	—		—	—	—	—	—	—	—	2007 Boston City Council; 2007 Springfield Mayoral; 2007 Worcester Mayoral	2007 5th congressional district special election
2008	2008 General	2008 Democratic Primary	2008 Presidential	2008 U.S. Senate	2008 U.S. House	—	2008 State Senate	2008 State House	—	2008 Ballot measures	—	—
2008	2008 General	2008 Republican Primary	2008 Presidential	2008 U.S. Senate	2008 U.S. House	—	2008 State Senate	2008 State House	—	2008 Ballot measures	—	—
2009	—	—		—	—	—	—	—	—	—	2009 Boston Mayoral; 2009 Boston City Council; 2009 Worcester Mayoral	—

=== 2010s ===
	General Election	Federal Elections				State Elections					Local Elections	Special Elections
	General Election	Presidential		Senate	House of Rep.	Governor	State Senate	State House of Reps	Governors Council	Ballot Measures	Local Elections	Special Elections
2010	2010 General		—	2010 U.S. Senate	2010 U.S. House	2010 Gubernatorial	—	2010 State House	2010 Governor's Council	2010 Ballot Measures	—	2010 Senate special election
2011	—	—		—	—	—	—	—	—	—	2011 Boston City Council; 2011 Springfield Mayoral; 2011 Worcester Mayoral	—
2012	2012 General	2012 Democratic Primary	2012 Presidential	2012 U.S. Senate	2012 U.S. House	—	2012 State Senate	2012 State House	2012 Governor's Council	2012 Ballot measures	—	—
2012	2012 General	2012 Republican Primary	2012 Presidential	2012 U.S. Senate	2012 U.S. House	—	2012 State Senate	2012 State House	2012 Governor's Council	2012 Ballot measures	—	—
2013	—	—		—	—	—	—	—	—	—	2013 Boston Mayoral; 2013 Boston City Council; 2013 Cambridge Municipal; 2013 Worcester Mayoral	2013 Senate special election; 2013 5th congressional special election
2014	2014 General	—		2014 U.S. Senate	2014 U.S. House	2014 Gubernatorial	2014 State Senate	2014 State House	2014 Governor's Council	2014 Ballot Measures	—	—
2015	—		—	—	—	—	—	—	—	—	2015 Boston City Council; 2015 Springfield Mayoral; 2015 Worcester Mayoral	—
2016	2016 General	2016 Democratic Primary	2016 Presidential	—	2016 U.S. House	—	2016 State Senate	2016 State House	2016 Governor's Council	—	2016 Ballot Measures	—
2016	2016 General	2016 Green Primary	2016 Presidential	—	2016 U.S. House	—	2016 State Senate	2016 State House	2016 Governor's Council	—	2016 Ballot Measures	—
2016	2016 General	2016 Republican Primary	2016 Presidential	—	2016 U.S. House	—	2016 State Senate	2016 State House	2016 Governor's Council	—	2016 Ballot Measures	—
2017	—	—		—	—	—	—	—	—	—	2017 Boston Mayoral; 2017 Boston City Council; 2017 Worcester Mayoral	—
2018	2018 General	—		2018 U.S. Senate	2018 U.S. House	2018 Gubernatorial	2018 State Senate	2018 State House	2018 Governor's Council	2018 Ballot Measures	—	—
2019	—	—		—	—	—	—	—	—	—	2019 Boston City Council; 2019 Springfield Mayoral; 2019 Worcester Mayoral	

=== 2020s ===
	General Election	Federal Elections				State Elections					Local Elections	Special Elections
	General Election	Presidential		Senate	House of Reps.	Governor	State Senate	State House of Reps.	Governor's Council	Ballot Measures		
2020	2020 Massachusetts general election	2020 Democratic Primary	2020 Presidential	2020 U.S. Senate	2020 U.S. House					2020 Ballot Measures		
2020	2020 Massachusetts general election	2020 Green Primary	2020 Presidential	2020 U.S. Senate	2020 U.S. House					2020 Ballot Measures		
2020	2020 Massachusetts general election	2020 Republican Primary	2020 Presidential	2020 U.S. Senate	2020 U.S. House					2020 Ballot Measures		
2021												
2022	2022 Massachusetts general election				2022 U.S. House	2022 Governor	2022 State Senate	2022 State House	2022 Governor's Council	2022 Ballot Measures		
2023												
2024	2024 Massachusetts general election	2024 Democratic Primary	2024 Presidential	2024 U.S. Senate	2024 U.S. House		2024 State Senate	2024 State House	2024 Governor's Council	2024 Ballot Measures		
2024	2024 Massachusetts general election	2024 Republican Primary	2024 Presidential	2024 U.S. Senate	2024 U.S. House		2024 State Senate	2024 State House	2024 Governor's Council	2024 Ballot Measures		
2025												
2026												

== See also ==
- Political party strength in Massachusetts
- United States presidential elections in Massachusetts
