= 1982 Massachusetts elections =

1982 Massachusetts general election
- November 2, 1982

Part of the 1982 United States elections

A Massachusetts general election was held on November 2, 1982 in the Commonwealth of Massachusetts.

The election included:

- statewide elections for United States Senator, Governor, Lieutenant Governor, Attorney General, Secretary of the Commonwealth, Treasurer, and Auditor;
- district elections for U.S. Representatives, State Representatives, State Senators, and Governor's Councillors; and
- ballot questions at the state and local levels.

Democratic and Republican candidates were selected in party primaries held September 14, 1982.

== Governor & Lieutenant Governor ==
Democrats Michael Dukakis and John Kerry were elected Governor and Lieutenant Governor, respectively, over Republican candidates John W. Sears and Leon Lombardi.

== Attorney general ==
1982 Massachusetts Attorney General election
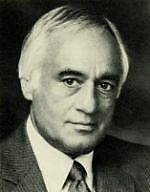

Nominee	Francis Bellotti	Richard L. Wainwright
Party	Democratic	Republican
Popular vote	1,555,400	375,557
Percentage	78.2%	18.9%
- County results Bellotti: 60–70% 70–80% 80–90%
Attorney General before election
Francis Bellotti
Democratic
Elected Attorney General
Francis Bellotti
Democratic

Democrat Francis X. Belotti was elected Attorney General. He defeated Republican Richard L. Wainwright and Libertarian Michael Reilly in the general election.

Massachusetts Attorney General Election, 1982
Party	Candidate	Votes	%	±%
Democratic	Francis X. Belotti (incumbent)	1,555,400	78.25%	▼0.18
Republican	Richard L. Wainwright	375,557	18.89%	▼2.67
Libertarian	Michael Reilly	56,835	2.86%	N/A
Write-in		36	0.00%	▼0.01
Total votes		1,987,828	100.00%	

== Secretary of the Commonwealth ==
1982 Massachusetts Secretary of the Commonwealth election
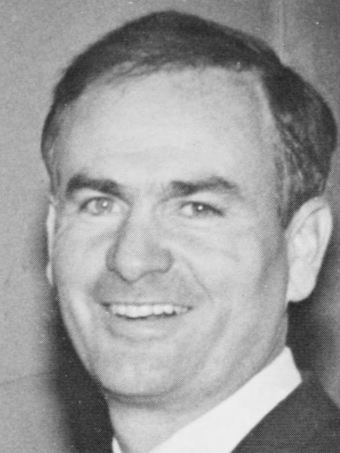

Nominee	Michael J. Connolly	Jody DeRoma Dow
Party	Democratic	Republican
Popular vote	1,368,314	455,975
Percentage	72.6%	24.2%
Secretary of the Commonwealth before election
Michael J. Connolly
Democratic
Elected Secretary of the Commonwealth
Michael J. Connolly
Democratic

Incumbent Secretary of the Commonwealth Michael J. Connolly defeated Republican Jody DeRoma Dow and Libertarian Robin D. Zazula in the general election.

=== Candidates ===
- Michael J. Connolly, incumbent Secretary of the Commonwealth (Democratic)
- Jody Deroma Dow (Republican)
- Robin Zazula (Libertarian)

=== Results ===
Massachusetts Secretary of the Commonwealth Election, 1982
Party	Candidate	Votes	%	±%
Democratic	Michael J. Connolly (incumbent)	1,368,314	72.62%	▲12.66
Republican	Jody DeRoma Dow	455,975	24.20%	▼15.82
Libertarian	Robin D. Zazula	60,003	3.18%	N/A
Write-in		43	0.00%	▼0.02
Total votes		1,884,335	100.00%	

== Treasurer and Receiver-General ==
1982 Massachusetts Treasurer election
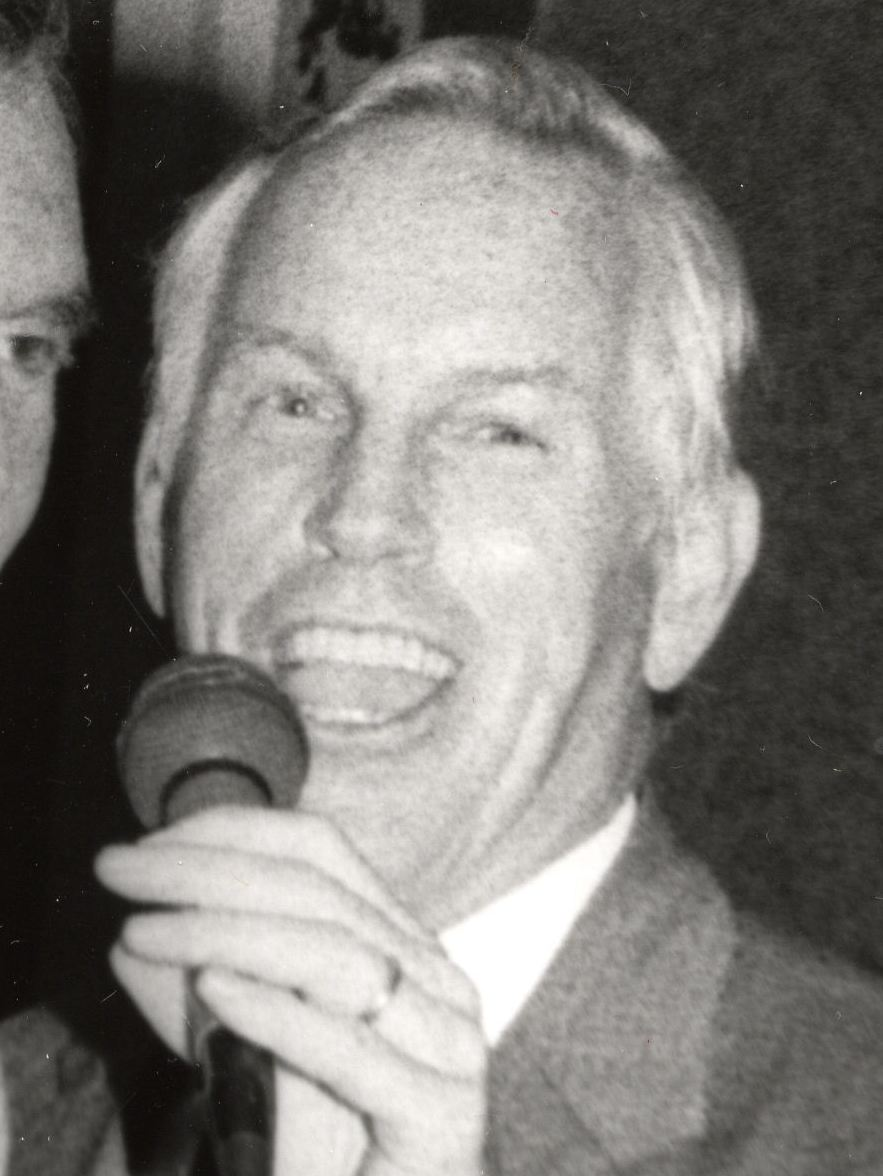

Nominee	Robert Q. Crane	Mary J. LeClair
Party	Democratic	Republican
Popular vote	1,338,150	506,200
Percentage	70.4%	26.6%
Treasurer and Receiver-General before election
Robert Q. Crane
Democratic
Elected Treasurer and Receiver-General
Robert Q. Crane
Republican

Incumbent Treasurer and Receiver-General Robert Q. Crane defeated Barnstable County Treasurer Mary J. LeClair and Libertarian Freda L. Nason in the general election.

=== Candidates ===
- Robert Q. Crane, incumbent Treasurer and Receiver-General (Democratic)
- Mary J. LeClair, Barnstable County Treasurer (Republican)
- Freda L. Nason (Libertarian)

=== Results ===
Massachusetts Treasurer and Receiver-General Election, 1982
Party	Candidate	Votes	%	±%
Democratic	Robert Q. Crane (incumbent)	1,338,150	70.42%	▲10.18
Republican	Mary J. LeClair	506,200	26.64%	▼13.12
Libertarian	Freda L. Nason	55,763	2.93%	N/A
Write-in		57	0.03%	▲0.03
Total votes		1,900,170	100.00%	

== Auditor ==
1982 Massachusetts Auditor election
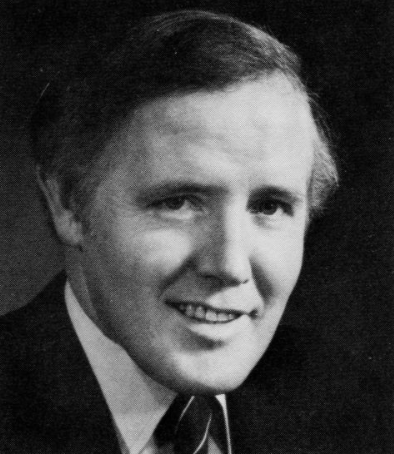

Nominee	John J. Finnegan	Michael S. Robertson
Party	Democratic	Republican
Popular vote	1,225,427	535,463
Percentage	66.9%	29.3%
Auditor before election
John J. Finnegan
Democratic
Elected Auditor
John J. Finnegan
Democratic

Incumbent Auditor John J. Finnegan defeated Republican Michael S. Robertson and Libertarian Donald E. Washburn in the general election.

=== Candidates ===
- John J. Finnegan, interim Auditor since 1981 (Democratic)
- Michael S. Robertson, nominee for U.S. Senate in 1976 (Republican)
- Donald E. Washburn (Libertarian)

=== Results ===
Massachusetts Auditor General Election, 1982
Party	Candidate	Votes	%	±%
Democratic	John J. Finnegan (incumbent)	1,225,427	66.94%	▲2.03
Republican	Michael S. Robertson	535,463	29.25%	▼5.84
Libertarian	Donald E. Washburn	69,795	3.81%	N/A
Write-in		31	0.00%	Steady
Total votes		1,830,685	100.00%	

== United States Senator ==
Democratic incumbent Ted Kennedy was re-elected over Republican Ray Shamie and Libertarian Howard S. Katz.

== Ballot questions ==
=== Question 1 ===
Proposed Amendment to the Constitution - The proposed constitutional amendment would remove the constitutional prohibition against the use of public funds to aid or maintain private primary or secondary schools.

Proposed Legislative Amendment to the Constitution
Candidate		Votes	%	±
	Yes	708,034	37.90%	
✓	No	1,160,130	62.10%	

=== Question 2 ===
Proposed Amendment to the Constitution - The proposed constitutional amendment would allow the legislature to enact laws authorizing the state courts to impose the death penalty on the conviction of crimes to be specified by the law.

Proposed Legislative Amendment to the Constitution
Candidate		Votes	%	±
✓	Yes	1,131,668	60.02%	
	No	748,549	39.98%	

=== Question 3 ===
Law Proposed by Initiative Petition - would require that before the construction or operation of any nuclear power plant or low-level radioactive waste storage or disposal facility in the Commonwealth, the legislature must make certain findings and a majority of voters must approve the facility at a statewide election.

Law Proposed by Initiative Petition
Candidate		Votes	%	±
✓	Yes	1,249,462	67.45%	
	No	602,955	32.55%	

=== Question 4 ===
Referendum on an Existing Law - The law requires that a refundable deposit be paid for certain beverage containers sold in Massachusetts.

Referendum on an Existing Law
Candidate		Votes	%	±
✓	Yes	1,143,955	59.10%	
	No	791,846	40.90%	
