= 1800 Massachusetts's 10th congressional district special election =

- August 25, 1800 (first round); October 20, 1800 (runoff)

Massachusetts's 10th congressional district
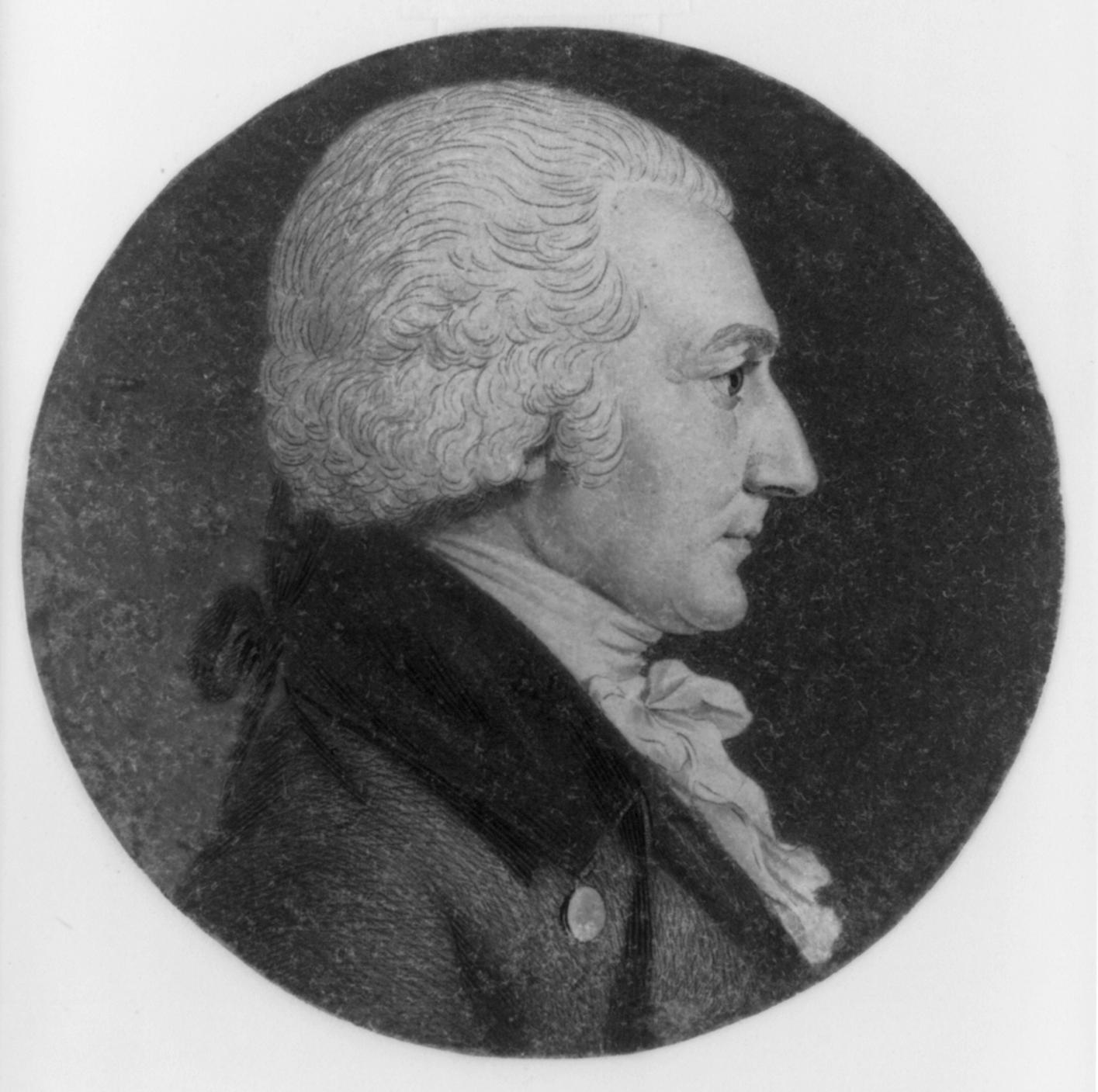

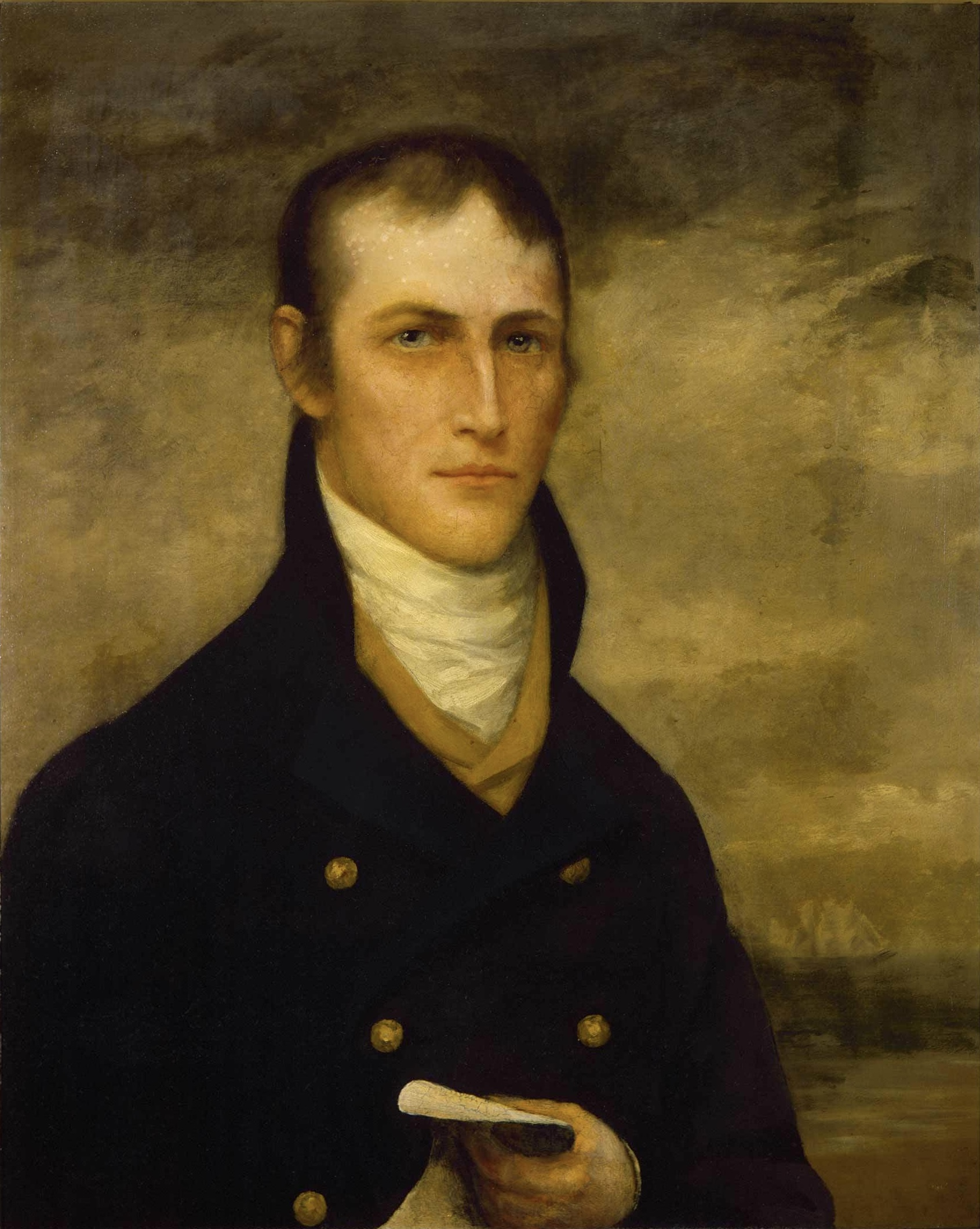
Nominee	Nathan Read	Jacob Crowninshield
Party	Federalist	Democratic-Republican
Popular vote	1,567	1,364
Percentage	53.5%	46.5%
U.S. Representative before election
Samuel Sewall
Federalist
Elected U.S. Representative
Nathan Read
Federalist

A special election was held in Massachusetts's 10th congressional district on August 25, 1800, and October 20, 1800, to fill a vacancy left by the resignation of Samuel Sewall (F).

== Election results ==
Massachusetts electoral law required a majority for election, which was not met on the first election, necessitating a second election.

Candidate	Party	First trial		Second trial	
Candidate	Party	Votes	Percent	Votes	Percent
Nathan Read	Federalist	803	45.3%	1,567	53.5%
Jacob Crowninshield	Democratic-Republican	873	49.2%	1,364	46.5%
Scattering		97	5.5%		

Read took his seat on November 25, 1800

== See also ==
- List of special elections to the United States House of Representatives
