= 1960 United States Senate election in Massachusetts =

- November 8, 1960
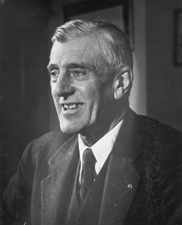

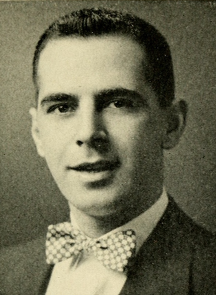
Nominee	Leverett Saltonstall	Thomas J. O'Connor
Party	Republican	Democratic
Popular vote	1,358,556	1,050,725
Percentage	56.19%	43.46%
- Saltonstall: 40–50% 50–60% 60–70% 70–80% 80–90% >90% O'Connor: 40–50% 50–60% 60–70%
Senator before election
Leverett Saltonstall
Republican
Elected Senator
Leverett Saltonstall
Republican

The United States Senate election of 1960 in Massachusetts was held on November 8, 1960. Republican incumbent Leverett Saltonstall was re-elected to a fourth term in office over Springfield mayor Thomas J. O'Connor.

== Democratic primary ==
=== Candidates ===
==== Declared ====
- Edmund C. Buckley, Middlesex County register of deeds
- Foster Furcolo, governor of Massachusetts
- Thomas J. O'Connor, mayor of Springfield

==== Withdrew ====
- Edmund Dinis, Southern District district attorney

=== Campaign ===
Governor Foster Furcolo, who lost to Saltonstall in 1954, decided to run against him again in 1960. On June 15, Springfield mayor Thomas J. O'Connor announced he would challenge Furcolo for the Democratic nomination. O'Connor received support from opponents of Furcolo's proposed state sales tax. Edmund Dinis briefly ran but dropped out during the party convention to support O'Connor.

=== Convention results ===
In a show of unity, Furcolo was nominated at the Democratic state convention by a political foe, Massachusetts Senate president John E. Powers. Furcolo defeated O'Connor by a 3 to 1 margin at the convention, but O'Connor decided to remain in the race.

1960 Democratic convention, U.S. Senate balloting
Party	Candidate	Votes	%
Democratic	Foster Furcolo	1,189	78.22%
Democratic	Thomas J. O'Connor	331	21.78%
Total votes		1,520	100.00%

=== Results ===
In the primary, O'Connor upset Furcolo 48 percent to 39 percent with Edmund C. Buckley winning the remaining 13 percent. O'Connor was able to sweep the western part of the state and top Furcolo by 10,000 votes in Boston.

1960 Democratic U.S. Senate primary
Party	Candidate	Votes	%
Democratic	Thomas J. O'Connor	270,081	48.33%
Democratic	Foster Furcolo	217,939	39.01%
Democratic	Edmund C. Buckley	70,744	12.66%
Total votes		558,764	100.00%

== General election ==
=== Candidates ===
- Lawrence Gilfedder (Socialist Labor)
- Thomas J. O'Connor, mayor of Springfield (Democratic)
- Leverett Saltonstall, incumbent U.S. senator since 1945 (Republican)
- Mark R. Shaw, perennial candidate (Prohibition)

=== Campaign ===
During the general election, O'Connor contrasted his youth to Saltonstall's age, calling him "yesterday's senator" and "The Late George Apley of Massachusetts politics." O'Connor also attacked the senator for "fail[ing] to act for the working man" and helping "big business brigands" destroy the Massachusetts textile industry.

Saltonstall ran on his long record of public service. He criticized O'Connor for stating that he would consider continue serving as mayor if elected, arguing that Americans need "not part-time leadership but full leadership." Saltonstall also criticized O'Connor for lacking substance. After refusing to debate O'Connor, Saltonstall stated, "If my opponent would express his opinions of some of the vital national and international issues, I would then consider whether I would debate on these subjects or not."

=== Results ===
Saltonstall defeated O'Connor by over 300,000 votes to hold on to his Senate seat, even though his Senate colleague John F. Kennedy carried the state by a wide margin in the concurrent presidential election.

General election
Party	Candidate	Votes	%	±%
Republican	Leverett Saltonstall (incumbent)	1,358,556	56.19%	▲5.65
Democratic	Thomas J. O'Connor	1,050,725	43.46%	▼5.57
Socialist Labor	Lawrence Gilfedder	5,735	0.24%	▼0.04
Prohibition	Mark R. Shaw	2,794	0.11%	▼0.04
Total votes		2,417,810	100.00%	
