= 1807 Massachusetts's 12th congressional district special election =

A special election was held in Massachusetts's 12th congressional district in 1807 to fill a vacancy left by the resignation of Barnabas Bidwell (DR), who had been appointed Massachusetts Attorney General on July 13 of that year.

== Election results ==
| Candidate | Party | Votes | Percent |
|---|---|---|---|
| Ezekiel Bacon | Democratic-Republican | 949 | 88.7% |
| Daniel Dewey | Federalist | 121 | 11.3% |

Bacon took his seat on November 2, 1807.

== See also ==
- List of special elections to the United States House of Representatives
