= 1800 Massachusetts's 4th congressional district special election =

A special election was held in Massachusetts's 4th congressional district on August 25, 1800, and October 20, 1800, to fill a vacancy left by the resignation of Dwight Foster (F) after his election to the Senate, the second election required because the first did not result in a majority.

== Election results ==
Candidate	Party	First trial		Second trial	
Candidate	Party	Votes	Percent	Votes	Percent
Levi Lincoln Sr.	Democratic-Republican	1,038	47.1%	1,079	49.8%
Jabez Upham	Federalist	572	25.9%	843	38.9%
Seth Hastings	Federalist	302	13.7%	129	6.0%
Salem Towne	Federalist	256	11.6%	103	4.7%
Scattering		37	1.7%	14	0.7%

Lincoln took his seat on February 6, 1801.

== See also ==
- List of special elections to the United States House of Representatives
