= 1956 Massachusetts elections =

1956 Massachusetts general election
- November 6, 1956

Part of the 1956 United States elections

A Massachusetts general election was held on November 6, 1956, in the Commonwealth of Massachusetts.

The election included:

- statewide elections for governor, lieutenant governor, attorney general, Secretary of the Commonwealth, treasurer, and auditor;
- district elections for U.S. Representatives, state representatives, state senators, and Governor's Councillors; and
- ballot questions at the state and local levels.

Democratic and Republican candidates were selected in party primaries held on September 18, 1956.

== Governor ==
Democrat Foster Furcolo was elected over Republican Sumner G. Whittier, Socialist Labor candidate Henning A. Blomen, and Prohibition candidate Mark R. Shaw.

== Lieutenant governor ==
1956 Massachusetts Lieutenant Governor election
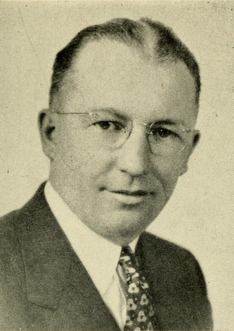

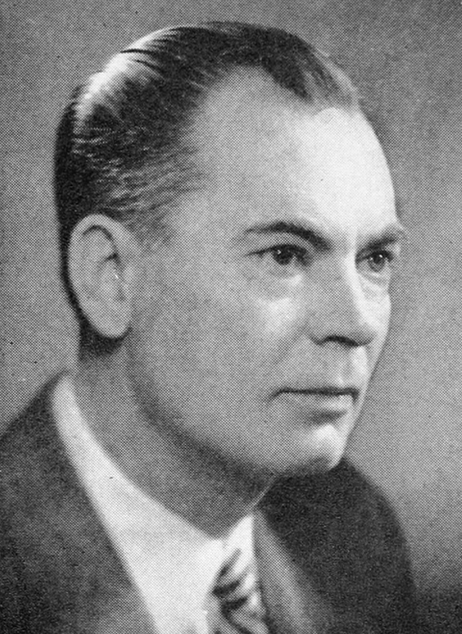
Nominee	Robert F. Murphy	Charles Gibbons
Party	Democratic	Republican
Popular vote	1,158,704	711,362
Percentage	51.2%	47.8%
- County results Murphy: 50–60% 60–70% Gibbons: 40–50% 50–60% 60–70% 70–80%
Lieutenant Governor before election
Sumner Whittier
Republican
Elected Lieutenant Governor
Robert F. Murphy
Democratic

Incumbent lieutenant governor Sumner Whitter ran for governor.

Democrat Robert F. Murphy was elected lieutenant governor over Republican Charles Gibbons, Socialist Labor candidate Francis A. Votano, and Prohibition candidate Harold E. Bassett.

=== Republican primary ===
==== Candidates ====
- Charles Gibbons, former Speaker of the Massachusetts House of Representatives

==== Results ====
Gibbons was unopposed for the Republican nomination.

=== Democratic primary ===
==== Candidates ====
- James A. Burke, former state representative from Milton and candidate for lieutenant Gtovernor in 1954
- Robert F. Murphy, former House Minority Leader and nominee for governor in 1954
- George A. Wells, executive councilor

==== Results ====
1956 Democratic lieutenant gubernatorial primary
Party	Candidate	Votes	%
Democratic	Robert F. Murphy	280,781	62.06%
Democratic	James A. Burke	95,111	21.02%
Democratic	George A. Wells	76,514	16.92%
Total votes		452,406	100.00%

=== General election ===
==== Results ====
Massachusetts gubernatorial election, 1956
Party	Candidate	Votes	%	±%
Democratic	Robert F. Murphy	1,158,704	51.23%	▲4.00
Republican	Charles Gibbons	1,082,113	47.84%	▼4.17
Socialist Labor	Francis A. Votano	13,286	0.59%	▲0.10
Prohibition	Harold E. Bassett	7,894	0.39%	▲0.12
Total votes		2,261,997	100.00%	

== Attorney general ==
1956 Massachusetts Attorney General election
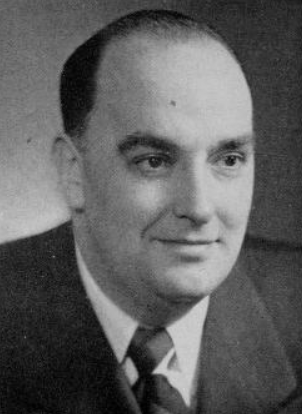

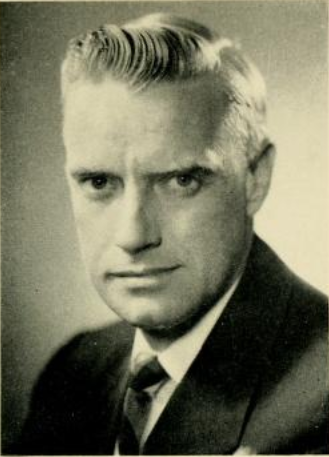
Nominee	George Fingold	Edward J. McCormack Jr.
Party	Republican	Democratic
Popular vote	1,152,348	1,113,105
Percentage	50.1%	48.9%
Attorney General before election
George Fingold
Republican
Elected Attorney General
George Fingold
Republican

Republican attorney general George Fingold was re-elected over Democrat Edward J. McCormack Jr., Socialist Workers candidate Fred M. Ingersol, and Prohibition candidate Howard Rand in the general election.

=== Democratic primary ===
==== Candidates ====
- Edward J. McCormack Jr., president of the Boston City Council
- Joseph D. Ward, State Representative from Fitchburg

==== Results ====
Massachusetts Attorney General Democratic Primary, 1956
Party	Candidate	Votes	%
Democratic	Edward J. McCormack Jr.	250,916	55.17%
Democratic	Joseph D. Ward	203,923	44.83%
Write-in		7	0.00%
Total votes		454,839	100.00%

=== General election ===
==== Candidates ====
- George Fingold, incumbent attorney general (Republican)
- Fred M. Ingersoll (Socialist Workers)
- Edward J. McCormack Jr., president of the Boston City Council (Democratic)
- Howard Rand (Prohibition)

==== Results ====
Massachusetts Attorney General Election, 1956
Party	Candidate	Votes	%	±%
Republican	George Fingold (incumbent)	1,152,348	50.58%	
Democratic	Edward J. McCormack Jr.	1,113,105	48.86%	
Socialist Workers	Fred M. Ingersoll	7,983	0.35%	
Prohibition	Howard Rand	4,779	0.20%	
Write-in		7	0.00%	
Total votes		2,278,222	100.00%	

== Secretary of the Commonwealth ==
Incumbent Secretary of the Commonwealth Edward J. Cronin defeated Republican Senate President Richard I. Furbush, Prohibition candidate Earl Dodge, and Socialist Labor candidate Lawrence Gilfedder in the general election.

=== Democratic primary ===
==== Candidates ====
- Edward J. Cronin, incumbent Secretary of the Commonwealth
- Robert Emmet Dinsmore

==== Results ====
1956 Secretary of the Commonwealth Democratic primary
Party	Candidate	Votes	%
Democratic	Edward J. Cronin (incumbent)	366,019	83.79%
Democratic	Robert Emmet Dinsmore	70,813	16.21%
Write-in		1	0.00%

=== General election ===
==== Candidates ====
- Edward J. Cronin, incumbent Secretary of the Commonwealth (Democratic)
- Earl Dodge, executive secretary of the Massachusetts Prohibition Party (Prohibition)
- Richard I. Furbush, president of the Massachusetts Senate (Republican)
- Lawrence Gilfedder (Socialist Workers)

==== Results ====
Massachusetts Secretary of the Commonwealth Election, 1956
Party	Candidate	Votes	%	±%
Democratic	Edward J. Cronin (incumbent)	1,196,746	53.40%	
Republican	Richard I. Furbush	1,025,295	45.75%	
Prohibition	Earl Dodge	10,030	0.45%	
Socialist Workers	Lawrence Gilfedder	9,181	0.41%	
Write-in		5	0.00%	

== Treasurer and receiver-general ==
Incumbent treasurer and receiver-general John Francis Kennedy defeated Norwood Selectman Clement A. Riley, John F. Buckley, John M. Kennedy, and Henry Joseph Hurley in the Democratic primary and Republican Robert H. Beaudreau, Socialist Labor candidate Willy N. Hogseth, and Prohibition candidate Isaac Goddard in the general election.

=== Democratic primary ===
==== Candidates ====
- John F. Buckley
- Henry Joseph Hurley
- John Francis Kennedy, incumbent treasurer and receiver-general
- John M. Kennedy
- Clement A. Riley, Norwood selectman and candidate for treasurer in 1954

==== Results ====
1956 Treasurer and Receiver-General Democratic primary
Party	Candidate	Votes	%
Democratic	John Francis Kennedy (incumbent)	186,382	40.83%
Democratic	Clement A. Riley	127,242	27.87%
Democratic	John F. Buckley	72,019	15.79%
Democratic	John M. Kennedy	43,925	9.62%
Democratic	Henry Joseph Hurley	26,881	5.89%
Write-in		1	0.00%

=== General election ===
==== Candidates ====
- Robert H. Beaudreau, U.S. Marshal for the District of Massachusetts (Republican)
- Isaac Goddard (Prohibition)
- Willy N. Hogseth (Socialist Workers)
- John Francis Kennedy, incumbent treasurer and receiver-general (Democratic)

==== Results ====
Massachusetts Treasurer and Receiver-General Election, 1956
Party	Candidate	Votes	%	±%
Democratic	John Francis Kennedy (incumbent)	1,196,626	53.04%	
Republican	Robert H. Beaudreau	1,043,812	46.26%	
Socialist Workers	Willy N. Hogseth	7,970	0.35%	
Prohibition	Issac Goddard	7,887	0.35%	
Write-in		5	0.00%	

== Auditor ==
Incumbent auditor Thomas J. Buckley defeated Republican Joseph A. Nobile, Socialist Labor candidate Anthony Martin, and Prohibition candidate John B. Lauder in the general election.

=== General election ===
1946 Auditor election
Party	Candidate	Votes	%	±%
Democratic	Thomas J. Buckley (incumbent)	1,278,635	57.19%	
Republican	Joseph A. Nobile	937,570	41.94%	
Socialist Workers	Anthony Martin	13,353	0.60%	
Prohibition	John B. Lauder	6,153	0.28%	
Write-in		4	0.00%	
