= 1958 Massachusetts elections =

1958 Massachusetts general election
- November 4, 1958

Part of the 1958 United States elections

A Massachusetts general election was held on November 4, 1958, in the Commonwealth of Massachusetts.

The election included:

- statewide elections for United States Senator, Governor, Lieutenant Governor, Attorney General, Secretary of the Commonwealth, Treasurer, and Auditor;
- district elections for U.S. Representatives, State Representatives, State Senators, and Governor's Councillors; and
- ballot questions at the state and local levels.

Democratic and Republican candidates were selected in party primaries held on September 9, 1958.

== Governor ==
Democrat Foster Furcolo was re-elected over Republican Charles Gibbons, Socialist Labor candidate Henning A. Blomen, and Prohibition candidate Guy S. Williams.

George Fingold was the only candidate in the Republican primary, however he died nine days before the primary. Gibbons won the nomination as a write-in candidate.

== Lieutenant governor ==
1958 Massachusetts Lieutenant Governor election
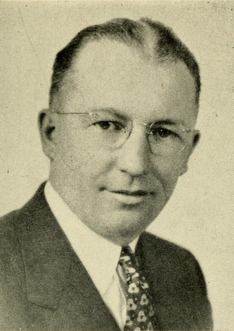

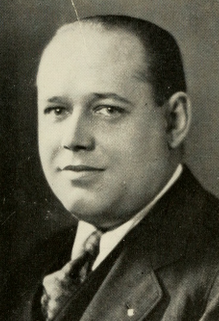
Nominee	Robert F. Murphy	Elmer C. Nelson
Party	Democratic	Republican
Popular vote	1,112,001	711,362
Percentage	60.3%	38.6%
- County results Murphy: 50–60% 60–70% 70–80% Gibbons: 50–60% 60–70%
Lieutenant Governor before election
Robert F. Murphy
Democratic
Elected Lieutenant Governor
Robert F. Murphy
Democratic

Democrat Robert F. Murphy was re-elected Lieutenant Governor over Republican Elmer C. Nelson, Socialist Labor candidate Francis A. Votano, and Prohibition candidate Harold E. Bassett.

=== Democratic primary ===
==== Candidates ====
- Robert F. Murphy, incumbent Lieutenant Governor

==== Results ====
Lt. Governor Murphy was unopposed for renomination.

=== Republican primary ===
==== Candidates ====
- Elmer C. Nelson, former Chair of the Massachusetts Republican Party

==== Results ====
Nelson was unopposed for the Republican nomination.

=== General election ===
==== Results ====
1958 Massachusetts Lieutenant Governor election
Party	Candidate	Votes	%	±%
Democratic	Robert F. Murphy	1,112,001	60.34%	▲9.11
Republican	Elmer C. Nelson	711,362	38.60%	▼9.24
Socialist Labor	Francis A. Votano	11,230	0.61%	▲0.02
Prohibition	Harold E. Bassett	8,300	0.45%	▼0.06
Total votes		1,842,893	100.00%	

== Attorney general ==
1958 Massachusetts Attorney General election
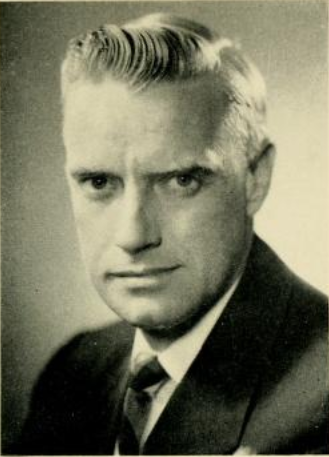

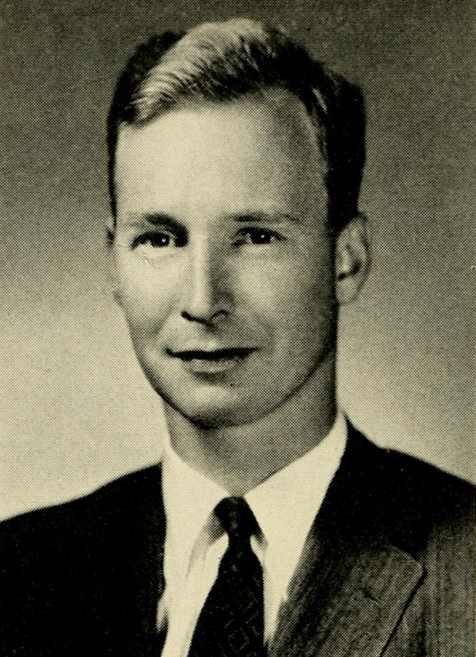
Nominee	Edward J. McCormack Jr.	Christian A. Herter Jr.
Party	Democratic	Republican
Popular vote	973,303	888,385
Percentage	52.0%	47.5%
Attorney General before election
George Fingold
Republican
Elected Attorney General
Edward J. McCormack Jr.
Democratic

Incumbent attorney general George Fingold ran for Governor instead of seeking reelection. He died on August 31, 1958, and Edward J. McCormack Jr., who won the Democratic primary over Endicott Peabody, was chosen by the Massachusetts General Court to finish his term.

McCormack defeated Republican Christian A. Herter Jr., Socialist Workers candidate Charles A. Couper, and Prohibition candidate Gustaf B. Nissan in the general election.

=== Democratic primary ===
==== Candidates ====
- Edward J. McCormack Jr., former Boston City Council member and nominee for Attorney General in 1956
- Endicott Peabody, former Governor Council member from Lawrence

==== Results ====
1958 Democratic primary
Party	Candidate	Votes	%
Democratic	Edward J. McCormack Jr.	238,477	54.63%
Democratic	Endicott Peabody	198,016	45.37%
Write-in		12	0.00%
Total votes		436,505	100.00%

=== General election ===
==== Results ====
1958 Massachusetts Attorney General election
Party	Candidate	Votes	%	±%
Democratic	Edward J. McCormack Jr.	973,303	52.01%	▲3.15
Republican	Christian A. Herter Jr.	888,385	47.47%	▼3.11
Socialist Workers	Charles A. Couper	6,048	0.32%	▼0.03
Prohibition	Gustaf B. Nissan	3,598	0.19%	▼0.01
Write-in		11	0.00%	Steady
Total votes		1,871,345	100.00%	

== Secretary of the Commonwealth ==
1958 Massachusetts Secretary of the Commonwealth election
Nominee	Edward J. Cronin	Marion Curran Boch
Party	Democratic	Republican
Popular vote	1,136,783	668,217
Percentage	62.4%	36.7%
Secretary of the Commonwealth before election
Edward J. Cronin
Democratic
Elected Secretary of the Commonwealth
Edward J. Cronin
Democratic

Incumbent Secretary of the Commonwealth Edward J. Cronin defeated Republican Marion Curran Boch, Socialist Labor candidate Fred M. Ingersoll, and Prohibition candidate Julia Kohler in the general election.

=== General election ===
==== Results ====
1958 Massachusetts Secretary of the Commonwealth election
Party	Candidate	Votes	%	±%
Democratic	Edward J. Cronin (incumbent)	1,136,783	62.38%	▲8.98
Republican	Marion Curran Boch	668,217	36.67%	▼9.08
Socialist Workers	Fred M. Ingersoll	9,547	0.52%	▲0.11
Prohibition	Julia Kohler	7,814	0.43%	▼0.02
Write-in		1	0.00%	Steady

=== Aftermath ===
Cronin died 20 days after the election.

== Treasurer and Receiver-General ==
1958 Massachusetts Treasurer election

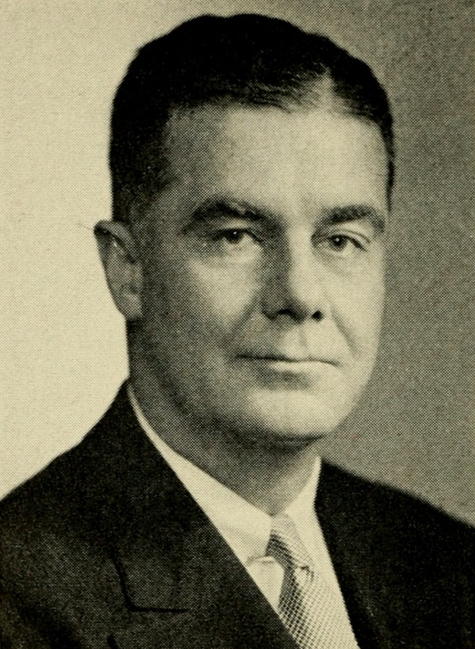
Nominee	John Francis Kennedy	John Yerxa
Party	Democratic	Republican
Popular vote	1,140,765	684,954
Percentage	62.0%	37.2%
Treasurer and Receiver-General before election
John Francis Kennedy
Democratic
Elected Treasurer and Receiver-General
John Francis Kennedy
Democratic

Incumbent Treasurer and Receiver-General John Francis Kennedy defeated Woburn Mayor William G. Shaughnessy in the Democratic primary and Republican State Senator John Yerxa, Socialist Labor candidate John Erlandsson, and Prohibition candidate Warren Carberg in the general election.

=== Democratic primary ===
==== Candidates ====
- John Francis Kennedy, incumbent Treasurer
- William G. Shaughnessy, mayor of Woburn

==== Results ====
1958 Democratic Treasurer primary
Party	Candidate	Votes	%
Democratic	John Francis Kennedy (incumbent)	256,155	61.78%
Democratic	William G. Shaughnessy	158,447	38.22%
Total votes		414,602	100.00%

=== General election ===
==== Results ====
1958 Massachusetts Treasurer and Receiver-General election
Party	Candidate	Votes	%	±%
Democratic	John Francis Kennedy (incumbent)	1,140,765	62.00%	▲8.96
Republican	John Yerxa	684,954	37.23%	▼9.03
Socialist Workers	John Erlandsson	7,814	0.42%	▲0.07
Socialist Workers	Warren Carberg	6,382	0.34%	▼0.01
Write-in		25	0.00%	Steady

== Auditor ==
Incumbent Auditor Thomas J. Buckley defeated Republican Thomas H. Adams, Socialist Labor candidate Arne Sortell, and Prohibition candidate John B. Lauder in the general election.

1958 Massachusetts Auditor election
Party	Candidate	Votes	%	±%
Democratic	Thomas J. Buckley (incumbent)	1,150,267	63.26%	▲6.07
Republican	Thomas H. Adams	654,808	36.01%	
Socialist Workers	Arne Sortell	7,698	0.42%	
Prohibition	John B. Lauder	5,621	0.31%	

== United States Senator ==
Democrat John F. Kennedy was re-elected over Republican Vincent J. Celeste, Socialist Labor candidate Lawrence Gilfedder, and Prohibition candidate Mark R. Shaw.
