= 1801 Massachusetts's 4th congressional district special election =

A special election was held in Massachusetts's 4th congressional district August 24, 1801 to fill a vacancy caused by the resignation of Levi Lincoln Sr. (DR) on March 5, 1801, before the first session of Congress, upon being appointed U.S. Attorney General.

== Election results ==
Massachusetts electoral law required a majority for election, which was not met on the June 22, 1801 first ballot, requiring a second election held on August 24.

Candidate	Party	First ballot (June 22, 1801)		Second ballot (August 24, 1801)	
Candidate	Party	Votes	Percent	Votes	Percent
Seth Hastings	Federalist	572	29.9%	1,583	54.2%
John Whiting	Democratic-Republican	869	45.4%	1,335	45.8%
Jabez Upham	Federalist	473	24.7%		

Hastings took his seat on January 11, 1802.

== See also ==
- List of special elections to the United States House of Representatives
