= 2013 Cambridge, Massachusetts municipal election =

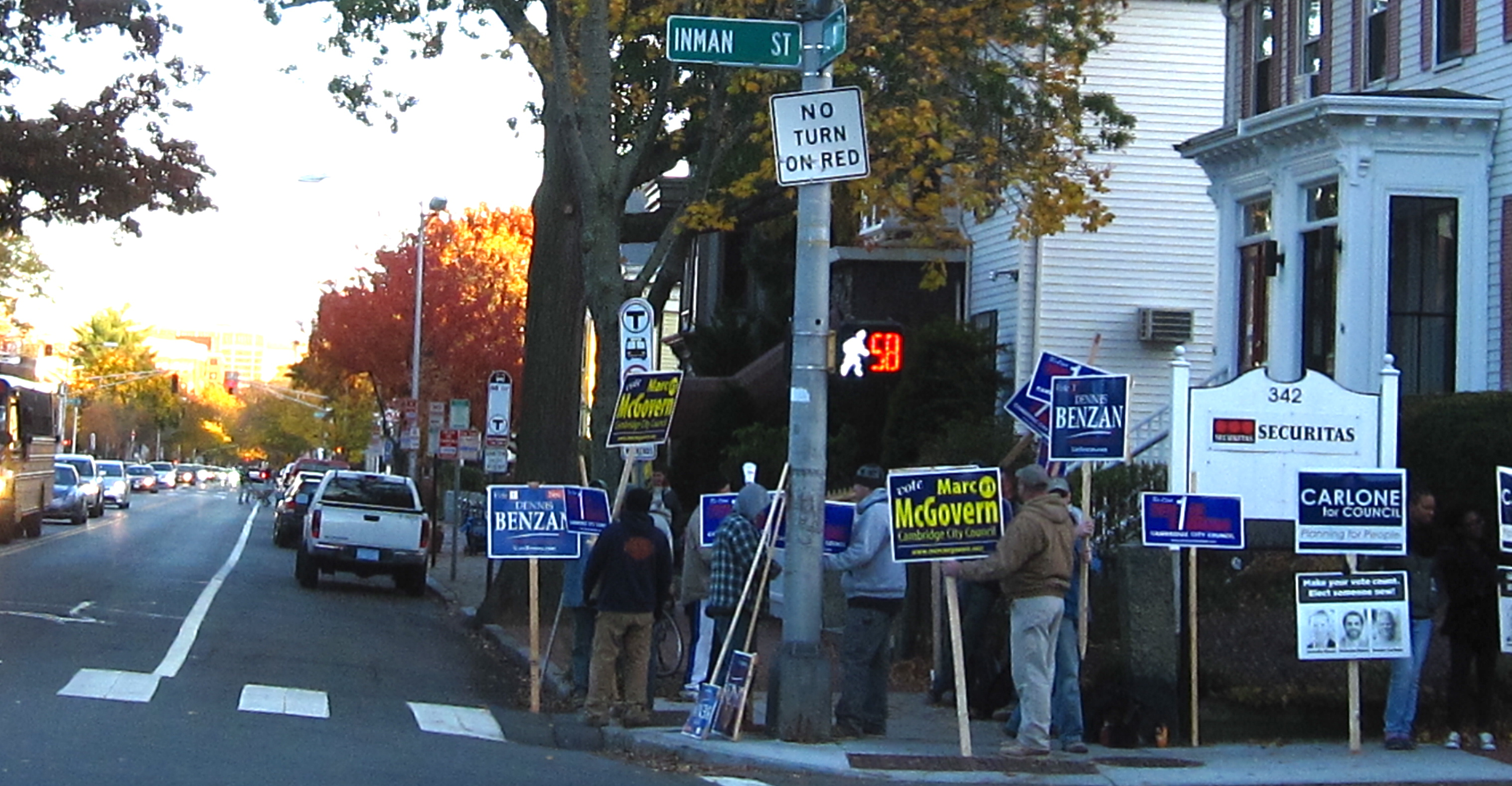
November 5, 2013, in Cambridge, Massachusetts

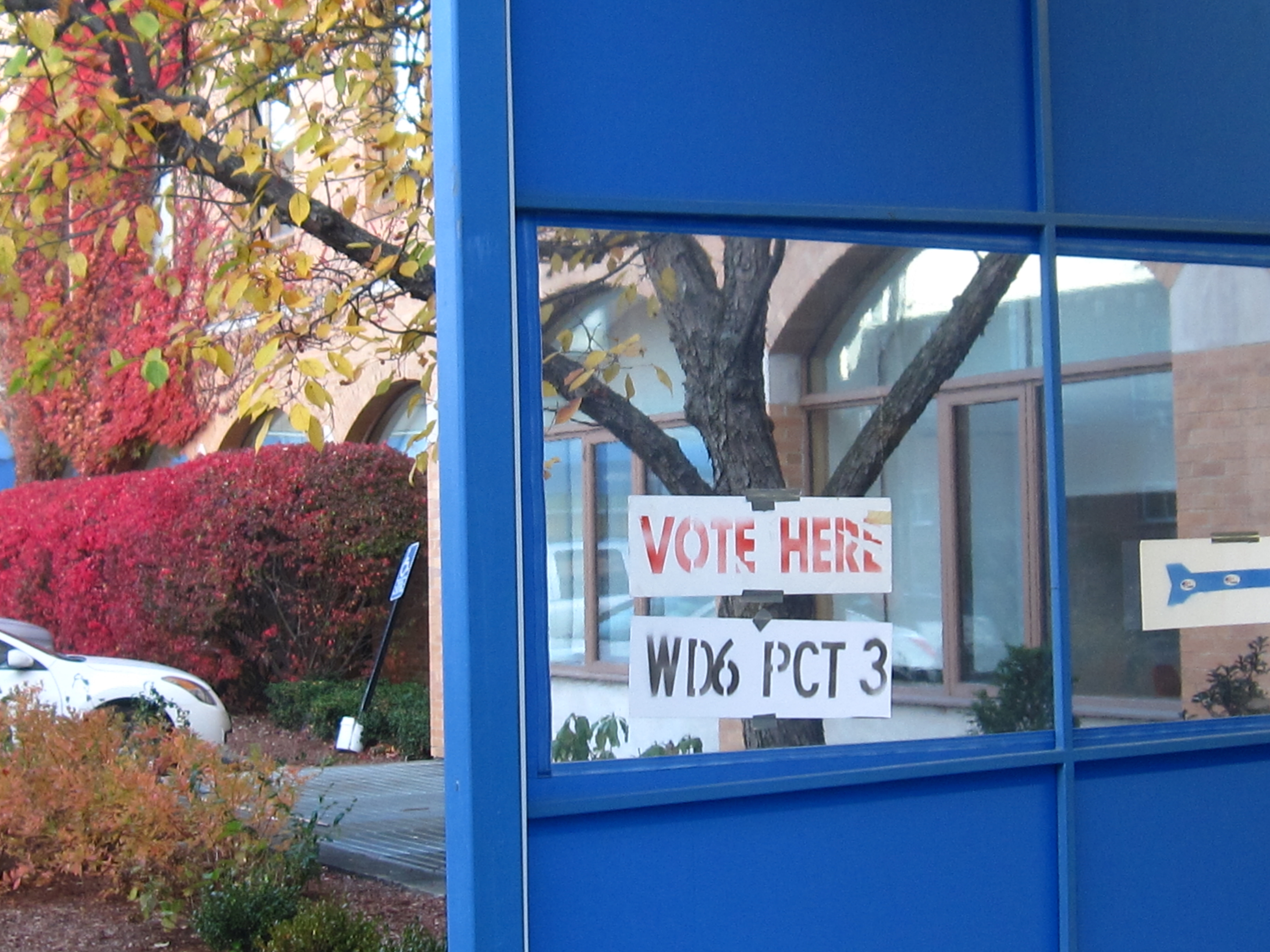
Polling place, Cambridge, Massachusetts

The Cambridge, Massachusetts municipal election of 2013 took place on Tuesday, November 5, 2013, to elect the nine members of the Cambridge City Council, and the School Committee.

Cambridge has a city government led by a mayor and nine-member city council. There is also a six-member School Committee which functions alongside the Superintendent of public schools. The councilors and school committee members are elected every two years using the single transferable vote system. Once a laborious process that took several days to complete by hand, ballot sorting and calculations to determine the outcome of elections are now quickly performed by computer, after the ballots have been optically scanned.

== City Council candidates ==
Voters indicated order of preference (first choice, second choice, etc.). for the 25 candidates. Seven of the 25 candidates were members of the outgoing council.

Candidate	First- preference votes	Result..	..on count
Leland Cheung (Note: Member of the outgoing council.)	2,391	Elected	1st
David P. Maher	1,464	Elected	15th
Timothy J. Toomey, Jr.	1,457	Elected	16th
Dennis A. Benzan	1,301	Elected	16th
Marc C. McGovern	1,187	Elected	17th
E. Denise Simmons	1,184	Elected	16th
Dennis J. Carlone	1,151	Elected	17th
Craig A. Kelley	1,093	Elected	17th
Nadeem A. Mazen	985	Elected	17th
Kenneth Reeves	934	Eliminated	15th
Minka Y. vanBeuzekom	875	Eliminated	16th
Sam Seidel	701	Eliminated	14th
Jefferson R. Smith	579	Eliminated	13th
Logan Edward Leslie	504	Eliminated	12th
Kristen Von Hoffmann	420	Eliminated	11th
Janneke Ann House	410	Eliminated	10th
Mushtaque A. Mirza	284	Eliminated	9th
Luis Vasquez	264	Eliminated	8th
Gary W. Mello	107	Eliminated	7th
Elie Yarden	102	Eliminated	6th
James Lee	91	Eliminated	5th
Lesley Rebec. Phillips	82	Eliminated	4th
James M. Williamson	74	Eliminated	3rd
Ronald Peden	49	Eliminated	2nd
Gregg J. Moree	38	Eliminated	2nd
Write-In 1	14	Eliminated	2nd
Write-In 2	2	Eliminated	2nd
