= 1970 Massachusetts elections =

1970 Massachusetts general election
- November 3, 1970

Part of the 1970 United States elections

The 1970 Massachusetts general election was held on November 3, 1970, throughout Massachusetts. Democratic and Republican candidates were selected in party primaries held September 15, 1970.

At the federal level, Ted Kennedy was re-elected to the United States Senate and ten of the commonwealth's twelve incumbents were re-elected to the United States House of Representatives. One retired and one lost re-nomination. No seats switched parties.

Incumbents seeking reelection won all major state offices: Governor, Attorney General, Secretary of the Commonwealth, Auditor, and Treasurer.

== Governor and lieutenant governor ==
Republicans Francis W. Sargent and Donald R. Dwight were elected Governor and Lieutenant Governor, respectively, over Democrats Kevin White and Michael Dukakis.

== Attorney general ==
1970 Massachusetts Attorney General election
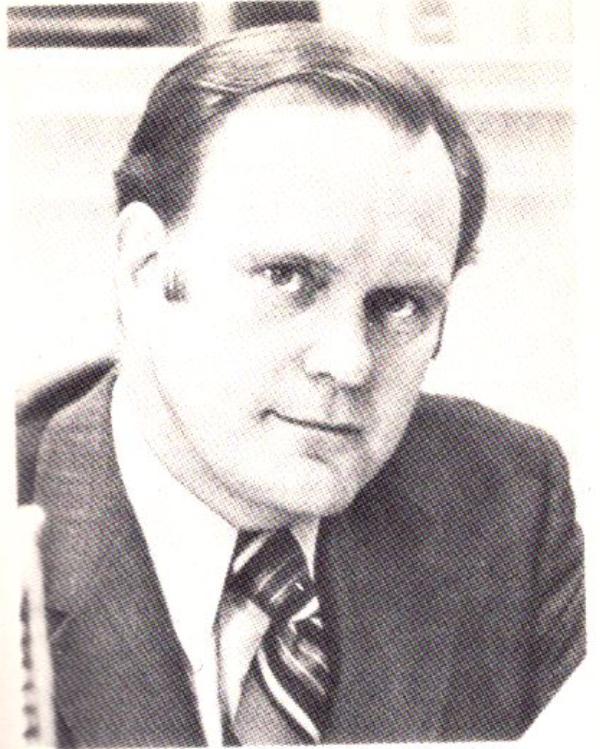

| Nominee | Robert H. Quinn | Donald L. Conn |
| Party | Democratic | Republican |
| Popular vote | 1,174,512 | 697,010 |
| Percentage | 62.2% | 36.9% |
Attorney General before election
Robert H. Quinn
Democratic
Elected Attorney General
Robert H. Quinn
Democratic

Attorney General Robert H. Quinn, who was appointed by the Massachusetts General Court to fill the unexpired term of Elliot Richardson, was elected to a full term. He defeated Republican Donald L. Conn.

=== General election ===
Massachusetts Attorney General Election, 1970
| Party | Candidate | Votes | % | ±% |
|---|---|---|---|---|
| Democratic | Robert H. Quinn (incumbent) | 1,174,512 | 62.22% | ▲14.91 |
| Republican | Donald L. Conn | 697,010 | 36.92% | ▼14.92 |
| Socialist Labor | Willy N. Hogseth | 16,257 | 0.86% | ▲0.86 |
| Write-in | | 24 | 0.00% | Steady |
| Total votes | | 1,887,803 | 100% | |

== Secretary of the Commonwealth ==
1970 Massachusetts Secretary of the Commonwealth election
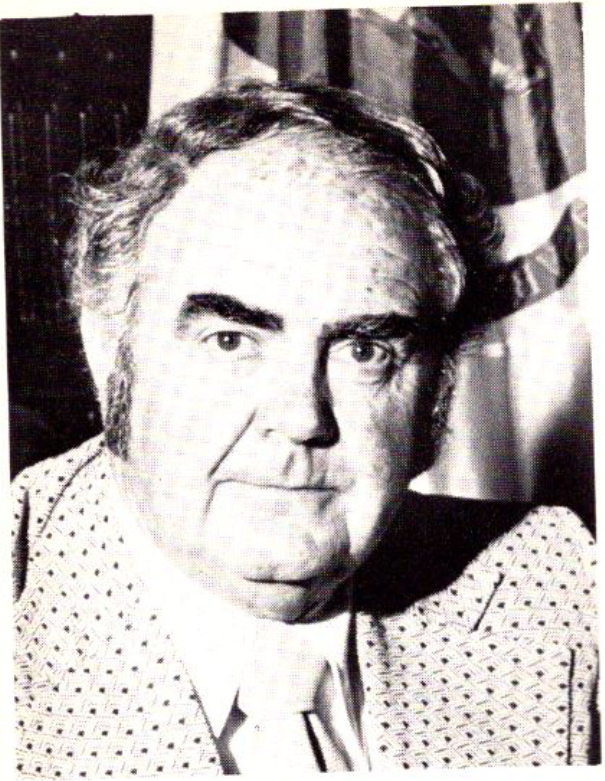

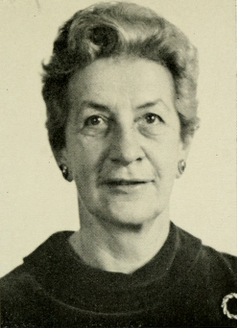
| Nominee | John Davoren | Mary B. Newman |
| Party | Democratic | Republican |
| Popular vote | 1,001,528 | 831,150 |
| Percentage | 53.8% | 44.7% |
Secretary of the Commonwealth before election
John Davoren
Democratic
Elected Secretary of the Commonwealth
John Davoren
Democratic

Secretary of the Commonwealth John Davoren, who was appointed by the Massachusetts General Court to fill the unexpired term of Kevin White, defeated Republican Mary B. Newman, Socialist Labor candidate Edgar E. Gaudet, and Prohibition candidate Murvin Becker in the general election.

=== General election ===
Massachusetts Secretary of the Commonwealth Election, 1970
| Party | Candidate | Votes | % | ±% |
|---|---|---|---|---|
| Democratic | John Davoren (incumbent) | 1,001,528 | 53.84% | ▼16.19 |
| Republican | Mary B. Newman | 831,150 | 44.68% | ▲15.64 |
| Socialist Labor | Edgar E. Gaudet | 17,445 | 0.94% | ▼0.33 |
| Prohibition | Murvin Becker | 10,165 | 0.55% | ▲0.07 |
| Write-in | | 5 | 0.00% | Steady |
| Total votes | | 1,860,293 | 100.00% | |

== Treasurer and Receiver-General ==
1970 Massachusetts Treasurer election
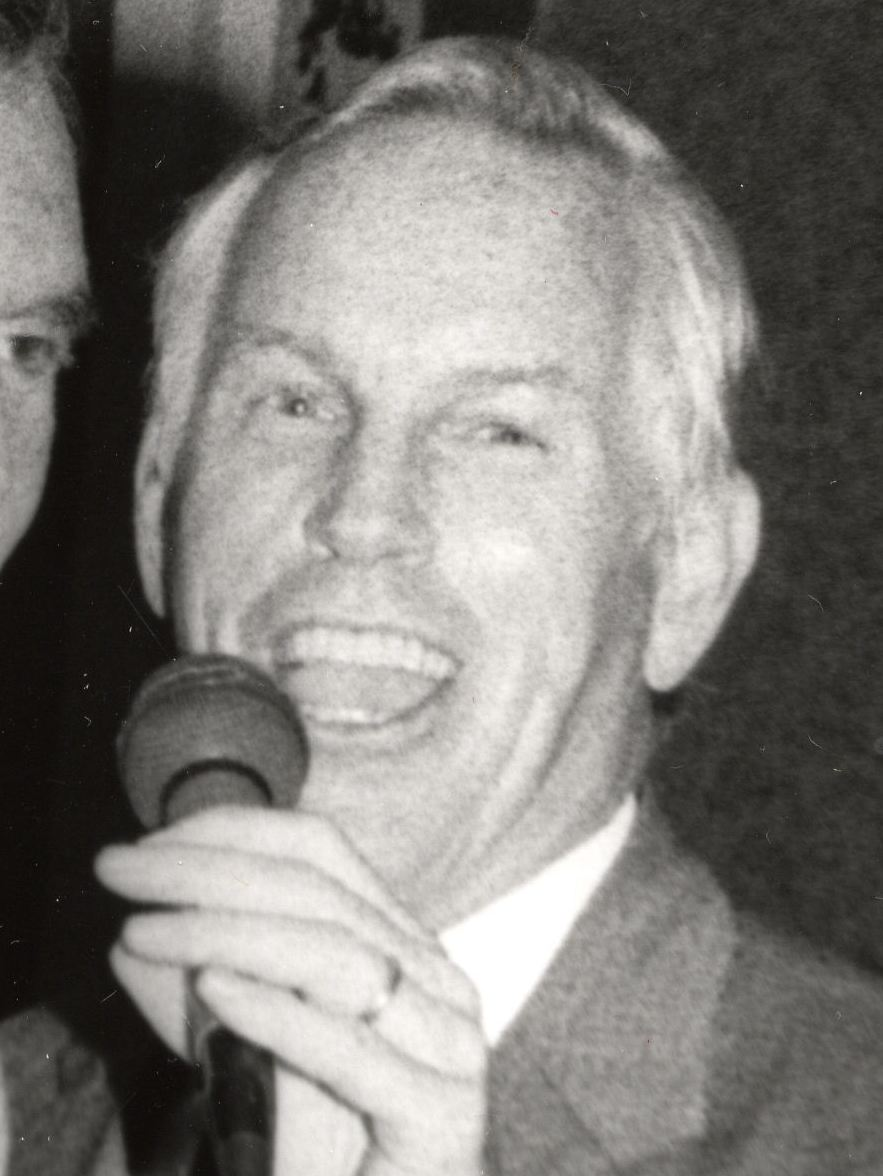

| Nominee | Robert Q. Crane | Frederick Hannon |
| Party | Democratic | Republican |
| Popular vote | 1,188,633 | 592,934 |
| Percentage | 65.6% | 32.7% |
Treasurer and Receiver-General before election
Robert Q. Crane
Democratic
Elected Treasurer and Receiver-General
Robert Q. Crane
Republican

Incumbent Treasurer and Receiver-General Robert Q. Crane defeated Republican Frederick Hannon, Socialist Labor candidate Roy K. Nelson, and Prohibition candidate John B. Lauder in the general election.

=== General election ===
Massachusetts Treasurer and Receiver-General Election, 1970
| Party | Candidate | Votes | % | ±% |
|---|---|---|---|---|
| Democratic | Robert Q. Crane (incumbent) | 1,188,633 | 65.61% | ▲3.06 |
| Republican | Frederick Hannon | 592,934 | 32.73% | ▼3.26 |
| Socialist Labor | Roy K. Nelson | 20,667 | 1.14% | ▲0.16 |
| Prohibition | John B. Lauder | 9,457 | 0.52% | ▲0.04 |
| Write-in | | 6 | 0.00% | Steady |

== Auditor ==
1970 Massachusetts Auditor election
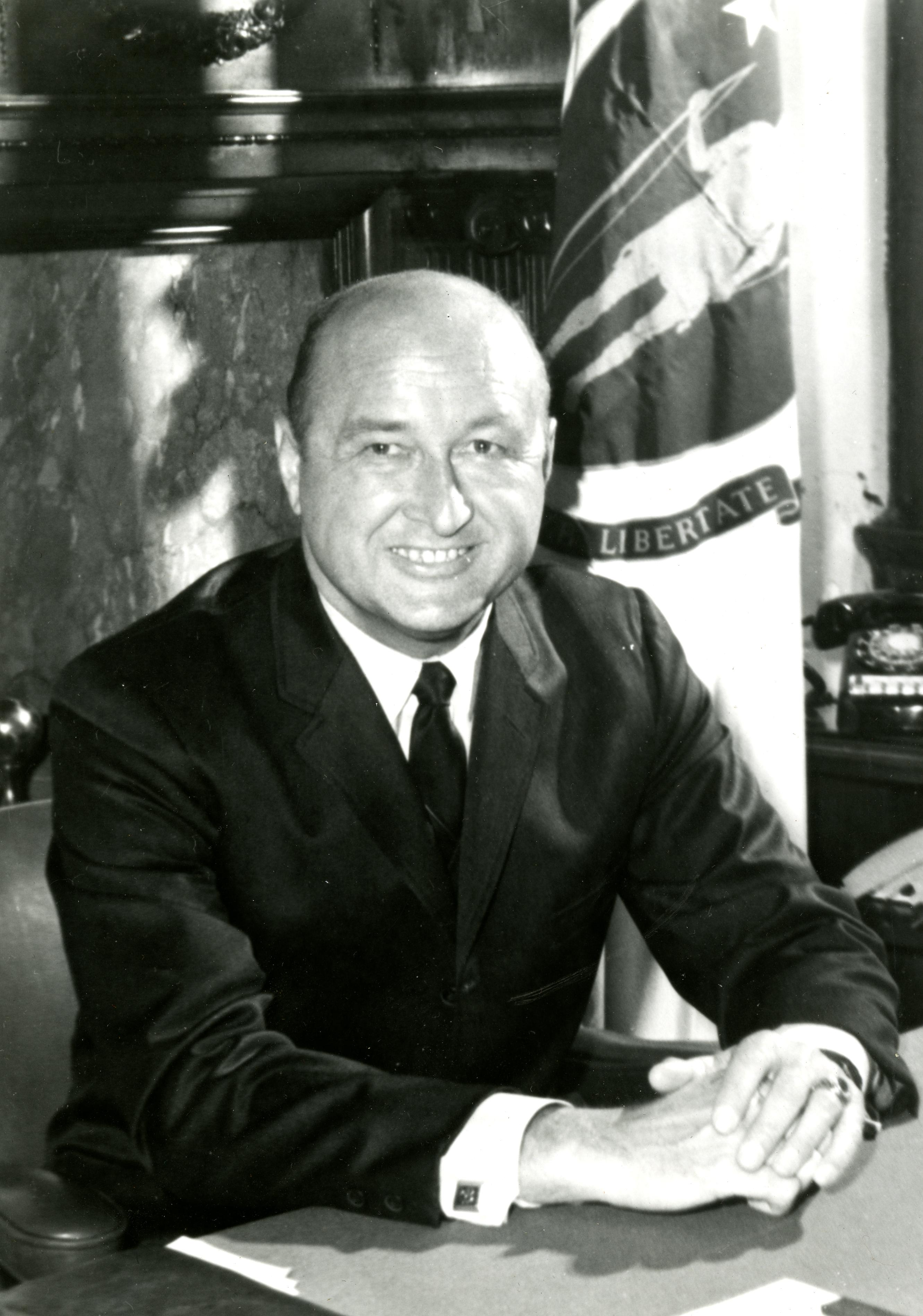

| Nominee | Thaddeus Buczko | Frank P. Bucci |
| Party | Democratic | Republican |
| Popular vote | 1,222,783 | 574,178 |
| Percentage | 66.9% | 31.4% |
Auditor before election
Thaddeus M. Buczko
Democratic
Elected Auditor
Thaddeus M. Buczko
Democratic

Incumbent Auditor Thaddeus M. Buczko defeated Republican Frank P. Bucci, Socialist Labor candidate Raymond Gray, and Prohibition candidate Roger I. Williams in the general election.

Massachusetts Auditor General Election, 1970
| Party | Candidate | Votes | % | ±% |
|---|---|---|---|---|
| Democratic | Thaddeus M. Buczko (incumbent) | 1,222,783 | 66.87% | ▲9.79 |
| Republican | Frank P. Bucci | 574,178 | 31.40% | ▼10.45 |
| Socialist Labor | Raymond Gray | 18,184 | 0.99% | ▲0.34 |
| Prohibition | Roger I. Williams | 13,373 | 0.73% | ▲0.31 |
| Write-in | | 2 | 0.00% | Steady |

== United States Senate ==
Democrat Ted Kennedy was re-elected to a second full term in office over Republican Josiah Spaulding.

== United States House of Representatives ==
All of Massachusetts' twelve seats in the United States House of Representatives were up for election in 2018.

Ten seats were won by candidates seeking re-election.

The 3rd District seat was won by Robert Drinan, who defeated incumbent Philip J. Philbin in the Democratic primary election. Philbin unsuccessfully campaigned as an independent candidate in the general election. The 9th District seat was won by Louise Day Hicks after incumbent John W. McCormack did not seek re-election.
