= 1820 Massachusetts's 8th congressional district special election =

A special election was held in Massachusetts's 8th congressional district on October 16, 1820, and November 24, 1820, to fill a vacancy caused by the resignation of Zabdiel Sampson (DR) on July 26, 1820.

== Election results ==
Although a majority was achieved on the first ballot, a second election was ordered because elections had not been held in the town of Hanson.

Candidate	Party	First ballot		Second ballot	
Candidate	Party	Votes	Percent	Votes	Percent
Aaron Hobart	Democratic-Republican	872	52.1%	588	68.7%
William Baylies	Federalist	803	47.9%		
Scattering				268	31.3%

Hobart took his seat on December 18, 1820

== See also ==
- List of special elections to the United States House of Representatives
