= 1796 Massachusetts's 1st congressional district special election =

A special election was held in Massachusetts's 1st congressional district on September 5, 1796, and November 21, 1796, to fill a vacancy caused by the resignation of Theodore Sedgwick (F) upon his election to the Senate

== Election results ==
Two elections were held due to a majority not being achieved on the first ballot.

Candidate	Party	First ballot		Second ballot	
Candidate	Party	Votes	Percent	Votes	Percent
Thomson J. Skinner	Democratic-Republican	1,325	48.0%	746	62.7%
Ephraim Williams	Federalist	1,379	49.9%	380	32.0%
Scattering		59	2.1%	63	5.3%

Skinner took office on January 27, 1797

== See also ==
- List of special elections to the United States House of Representatives
