= 1811 Massachusetts's 4th congressional district special election =

A special election was held in Massachusetts's 4th congressional district on September 23, 1811, and November 4, 1811, to fill a vacancy left by the resignation of Joseph Bradley Varnum (DR) upon being elected to the Senate on June 29, 1811

== Election results ==
Two elections were required, due to a majority not being achieved on the first election

| Candidate | Party | First election | | Second election | |
| Candidate | Party | Votes | Percent | Votes | Percent |
|---|---|---|---|---|---|
| William M. Richardson | Democratic-Republican | | | 1,754 | 52.1% |
| John Tuttle | Democratic-Republican | 1,361 | 44.5% | | |
| Loammi Baldwin | Federalist | 1,142 | 37.4% | 1,169 | 34.7% |
| Edmund Foster | Democratic-Republican | 382 | 12.5% | 277 | 8.2% |
| Marshall Spring | Democratic-Republican | 173 | 5.7% | 168 | 5.0% |

Richardson took his seat January 22, 1812

== See also ==
- List of special elections to the United States House of Representatives
