= 1800 Massachusetts's 3rd congressional district special election =

A special election was held in Massachusetts's 3rd congressional district on December 15, 1800, to fill a vacancy left by the resignation of Samuel Lyman (F) on November 6, 1800.

== Election results ==
| Candidate | Party | Votes | Percent |
|---|---|---|---|
| Ebenezer Mattoon | Federalist | 1,142 | 100% |

Mattoon took his seat on February 2, 1801. Mattoon had also been elected to the same district for the 7th Congress.

== See also ==
- List of special elections to the United States House of Representatives
