= Nathan Read =

American politician

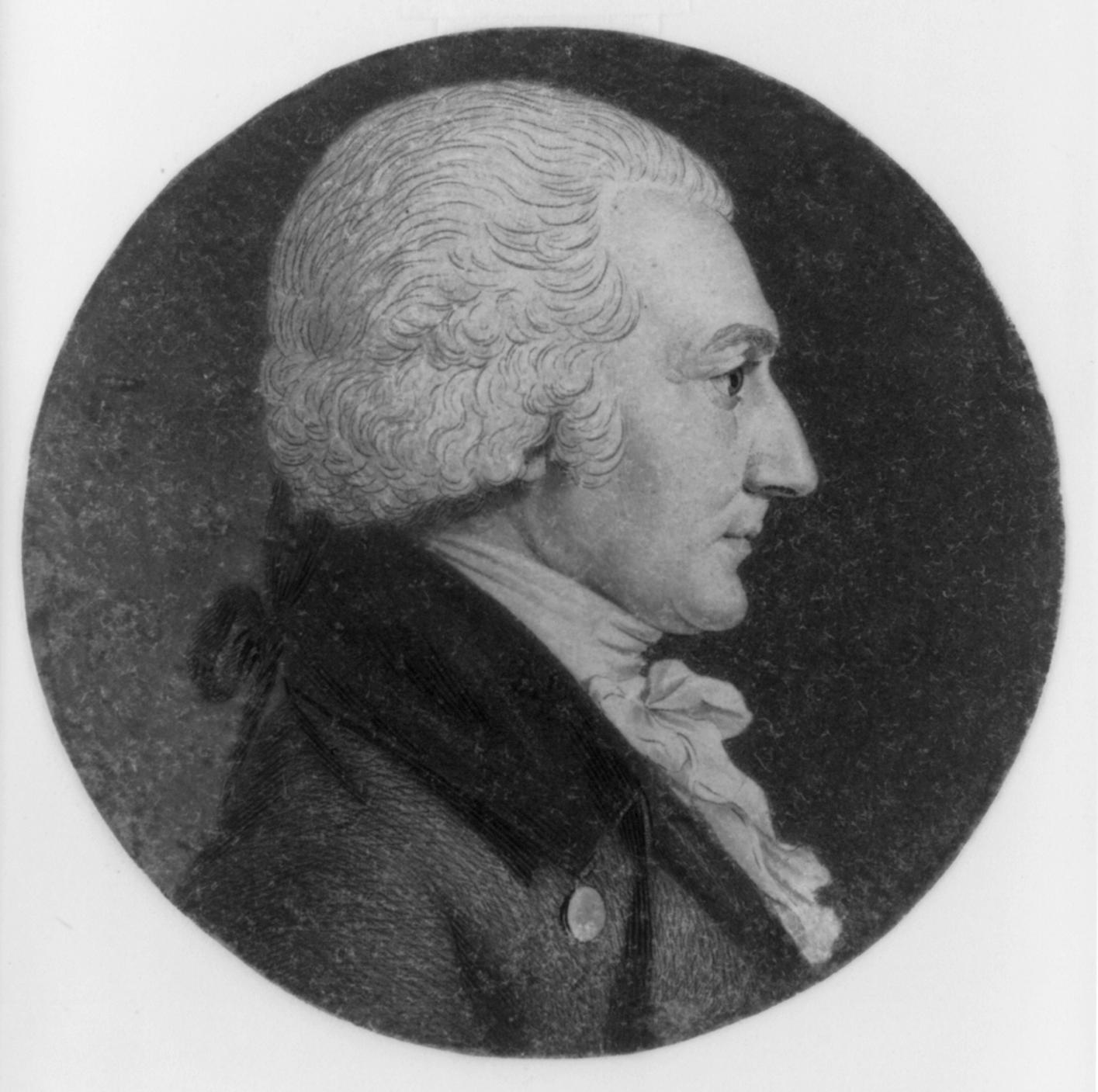

Member of the U.S. House of Representatives from Massachusetts's 10th district
- In office November 25, 1800 – March 3, 1803
- Preceded by: Samuel Sewall
- Succeeded by: Seth Hastings

Personal details
- Born: July 2, 1759 Western, Massachusetts Bay, British America (now Warren, Massachusetts)
- Died: January 20, 1849 (aged 89) Belfast, Maine, U.S.
- Party: Federalist
- Education: Harvard University
- Occupation: Engineer

Nathan Read (July 2, 1759 – January 20, 1849) was an American engineer and steam pioneer.

Nathan Read was the true inventor of the high-pressure steam engine in 1789, this was twelve years before the steam-engine was known to be used in the form of a high-pressure engine, and led a great revolution in steam power to navigation and land-transport.

== Early life and family ==
Nathan Read was born in the town of Western (later renamed "Warren") in the Province of Massachusetts Bay, on July 2, 1759. His ancestors came from Newcastle-upon-Tyne, northeast England. His father, Reuben Read, was an officer in the Revolutionary service and his mother's maiden name was Tamsin Meacham.

In 1774, Nathan Read commenced his preparatory studies for college. At the close of the summer vacation of 1777, he became a student at Harvard University.

== Harvard University ==
At Harvard, Read studied medicine and graduated in 1781. He taught school in Beverly and Salem and was elected a tutor in Harvard University. After graduating, he became a scholar until 1783. Then, he was elected a tutor and continued his labors as such where he continued until 1787. He was elected a Fellow of the American Academy of Arts and Sciences in 1791.

== As an apothecary ==
Then, he opened an apothecary store in Salem and developed potassium bicarbonate (KHCO_{3}) in 1788, but kept the store for only one year.

== High-pressure steam engine ==
From October 1788, Nathan Read quit the last work and began to make a number of improvements of the steam engine. He invented and patented the multi-tubular boiler. He then made efforts to improve the function of the steam cylinder, and placed it in a horizontal position so the engine could sustain much higher pressure, that is to say, Read invented the high-pressure steam engine, a new kind of steam engine, different from James Watt's old engine. Read made the engine more convenient and portable, also much lighter and safer. The most important was that the new engine needed much less room and fuel than the old one. Read successfully reconstructed the steam engine; he modified the Watt engine to a high-pressure engine that could be widely used in new fields, such as steamboat and locomotive.

=== Use in transportation ===
To prove the usefulness of the high-pressure steam engine, Read made several models of steamcar and steamboat in 1790. Read's experiment was very successful; it proved that the engine he built functioned well. He also invented the chain-wheel for paddle wheels to propel the steamboat, and set up a shipbuilding factory with his friends in 1796. There is, however, no evidence he ever built a full-scale version of his models.

== Nail machine ==
Several years later, Read made another important innovation. He developed a new machine, which could be used for cutting and heading nails at one operation. It was patented on January 8, 1798. A sample of this machine is owned by the Peabody Essex Museum.

== Other inventions ==
He developed a style of rotary steam engine in 1817.

In agricultural areas, he had more inventions and plans, such as threshing machine, thrashing machine, different forms of pumping engines and a new kind of windmill. He developed a plan for using the expansion and contraction of metals, multiplied by levers, widely used in winding up clocks and other purposes. He patented some of them, but others were mainly used in agricultural fields and never patented.

== Marriage ==
Nathan Read married Elizabeth Jeffrey in October 1790.

== Politics ==
Read was selected as a Federalist to the Sixth Congress to fill the vacancy caused by the resignation of Samuel Sewall; and was popularly elected to the Seventh Congress and served from November 25, 1800, to March 3, 1803. He was not a candidate for renomination in 1802. In 1803, he was judge of the Court of Common Pleas of Essex County. In 1807, he moved to Belfast, Maine, and was judge of the county court of Hancock County that year. He was instrumental in establishing Belfast Academy and served as trustee for forty years. He died near Belfast; interment was in Grove Cemetery, Belfast.

== Notes ==
U.S. House of Representatives
Preceded by Samuel Sewall	Member of the U.S. House of Representatives from Massachusetts's 10th congressional district 1800–1803	Succeeded by Seth Hastings
