= 1976 United States Senate election in Massachusetts =

- November 2, 1976
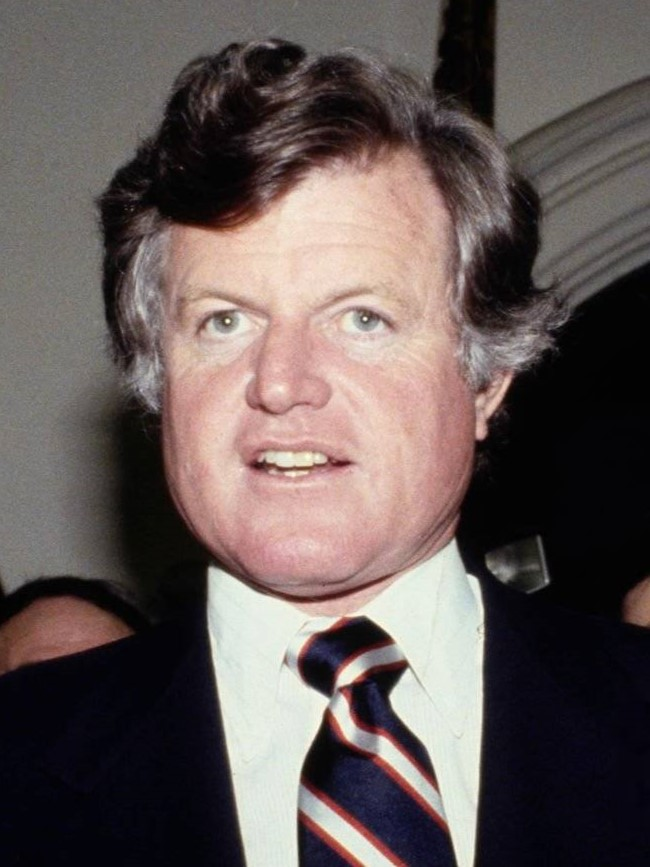

Nominee	Ted Kennedy	Michael Robertson
Party	Democratic	Republican
Popular vote	1,726,657	722,641
Percentage	69.31%	29.01%
- Kennedy: 40–50% 50–60% 60–70% 70–80% 80–90% Robertson: 40–50% 50–60%
U.S. senator before election
Ted Kennedy
Democratic
Elected U.S. Senator
Ted Kennedy
Democratic

The 1976 United States Senate election in Massachusetts was held on November 2, 1976. Incumbent Democratic U.S. Senator Ted Kennedy won re-election to his fourth (his third full) term.

== Democratic primary ==
=== Candidates ===
==== Declared ====
- Robert Emmet Dinsmore, candidate for Boston City Council in 1971
- Ted Kennedy, incumbent U.S. senator
- Frederick C. Langone, member of the Boston City Council

==== Withdrawn ====
- Albert Onessimo
- Bernard P. Shannon (endorsed Dinsmore)

=== Results ===
Democratic primary results

1976 Democratic U.S. Senate primary
Party	Candidate	Votes	%
Democratic	Ted Kennedy (incumbent)	534,725	73.86%
Democratic	Robert Dinsmore	117,496	16.23%
Democratic	Frederick C. Langone	59,315	8.19%
Democratic	Bernard Shannon (withdrawn)	12,399	1.71%
Write-in	All others	53	0.01%
Total votes		723,988	100.00%

== Republican primary ==
=== Candidates ===
- Michael Robertson, businessman

=== Results ===
Robertson was unopposed for the Republican nomination.

== Results ==
General election
Party	Candidate	Votes	%	±%
Democratic	Edward M. Kennedy (incumbent)	1,726,657	69.31	▲7.15
Republican	Michael S. Robertson	722,641	29.01	▼7.99
Socialist Workers	Carol Henderson Evans	26,283	1.06	▲0.52
U.S. Labor	H. Graham Lowry	15,517	0.62	N/A
Write-in	All others	157	0.01	Steady
Total votes		2,491,255	85.55%	
Democratic hold		Swing		

== See also ==
- 1976 United States Senate elections
