= 1960 Massachusetts elections =

1960 Massachusetts general election
- November 8, 1960

Part of the 1960 United States elections

A Massachusetts general election was held on November 8, 1960, in the Commonwealth of Massachusetts.

The election included:

- statewide elections for United States Senator, Governor, Lieutenant Governor, Attorney General, Secretary of the Commonwealth, Treasurer, and Auditor;
- district elections for U.S. Representatives, State Representatives, State Senators, and Governor's Councillors; and
- ballot questions at the state and local levels.

Democratic and Republican candidates were selected in party primaries held on September 13, 1960.

== Governor ==
Republican John A. Volpe was elected over Democrat Joseph D. Ward, Socialist Labor candidate Henning A. Blomen, and Prohibition candidate Guy S. Williams.

== Lieutenant governor ==
1960 Massachusetts Lieutenant Governor election
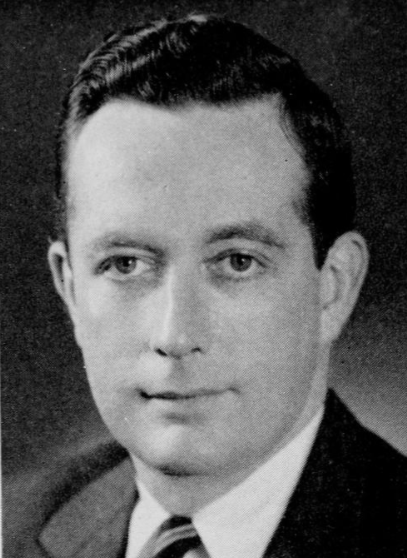

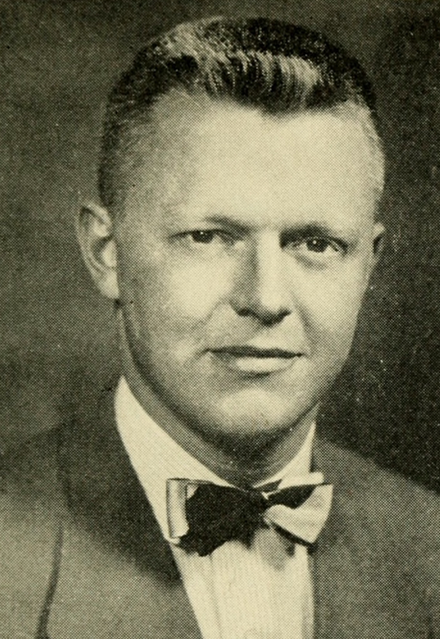
Nominee	Edward F. McLaughlin Jr.	Augustus Gardner Means
Party	Democratic	Republican
Popular vote	1,265,244	1,056,679
Percentage	54.0%	45.0%
- County results McLaughlin: 50–60% 60–70% Means: 50–60% 60–70%
Lieutenant Governor before election
Robert F. Murphy
Democratic
Elected Lieutenant Governor
Edward F. McLaughlin Jr.
Democratic

Democrat Edward F. McLaughlin Jr. was elected Lieutenant Governor over Republican Augustus Gardner Means, Socialist Labor candidate Francis A. Votano, and Prohibition candidate Thomas Maratea. This is the last time that a Lieutenant Governor would not be from the same party as the Governor.

=== Democratic primary ===
==== Candidates ====
- Pasquale Caggiano, perennial candidate
- Edward F. McLaughlin Jr., Boston City Council President

==== Results ====
Massachusetts Democratic Lt. gubernatorial primary, 1960
Party	Candidate	Votes	%
Democratic	Edward F. McLaughlin Jr.	403,694	77.09%
Democratic	Pasquale Caggiano	119,943	22.91%
Write-in	All others	2	0.00%
Total votes		523,639	100.00%

=== Republican primary ===
==== Candidates ====
- Augustus Gardner Means, member of the Massachusetts Governor's Council

==== Results ====
Means was unopposed for the Republican nomination.

=== General election ===
==== Lieutenant governor ====
Massachusetts gubernatorial election, 1960
Party	Candidate	Votes	%	±%
Democratic	Edward F. McLaughlin Jr.	1,265,244	53.99%	
Republican	Augustus Gardner Means	1,056,679	45.01%	
Socialist Labor	Francis A. Votano	12,380	0.53%	
Prohibition	Thomas Maratea	8,853	0.38%	
Total votes		2,343,156	100.00%	

== Attorney General ==
1960 Massachusetts Attorney General election
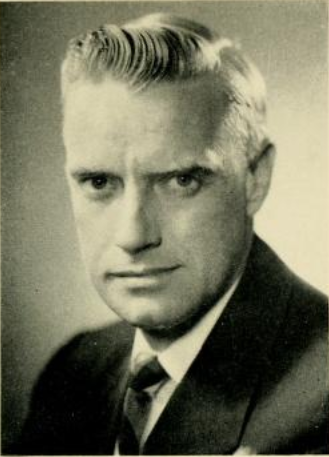

Nominee	Edward J. McCormack Jr.	George Michaels
Party	Democratic	Republican
Popular vote	1,386,452	954,136
Percentage	58.8%	40.5%
Attorney General before election
Edward J. McCormack Jr.
Democratic
Elected Attorney General
Edward J. McCormack Jr.
Democratic

Incumbent Attorney General Edward J. McCormack, Jr. defeated Republican George Michaels, Socialist Workers candidate August Johnson, and Prohibition candidate William D. Ross.

=== General election ===
==== Results ====
Massachusetts Attorney General Election, 1960
Party	Candidate	Votes	%	±%
Democratic	Edward J. McCormack, Jr. (incumbent)	1,386,452	58.81%	
Republican	George Michaels	954,136	40.47%	
Socialist Workers	August Johnson	11,839	0.50%	
Prohibition	William D. Ross	5,240	0.22%	
Write-in		2	0.00%	

== Secretary of the Commonwealth ==
1960 Massachusetts Secretary of the Commonwealth election

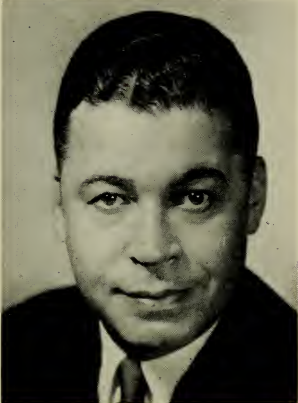
Nominee	Kevin White	Edward Brooke
Party	Democratic	Republican
Popular vote	1,206,844	1,095,054
Percentage	52.0%	47.2%
Secretary of the Commonwealth before election
Joseph D. Ward
Democratic
Elected Secretary of the Commonwealth
Kevin White
Democratic

Incumbent Secretary of the Commonwealth Joseph D. Ward did not run for re-election as he instead ran for Governor.

Kevin White defeated Francis X. Ahearn and Margaret McGovern in the Democratic primary.

The Republicans nominated Edward Brooke, who became the first African-American to be nominated for Massachusetts statewide office by a major party.

White defeated Brooke, Socialist Labor candidate Fred M. Ingersoll, and Prohibition candidate Julia Kohler in the general election.

=== Democratic primary ===
==== Candidates ====
- Francis X. Ahearn, former President of the Boston City Council
- Margaret McGovern, attorney
- Kevin White, attorney and son of Joseph C. White

==== Results ====
1960 Democratic primary for Secretary of the Commonwealth
Party	Candidate	Votes	%
Democratic	Kevin White	203,292	39.44%
Democratic	Francis X. Ahearn	188,275	36.52%
Democratic	Margaret McGovern	123,907	24.04%
Write-in		10	0.00%

=== General election ===
Massachusetts Secretary of the Commonwealth Election, 1960
Party	Candidate	Votes	%	±%
Democratic	Kevin White	1,206,844	52.02%	
Republican	Edward Brooke	1,095,054	47.21%	
Socialist Workers	Fred M. Ingersoll	11,046	0.48%	
Prohibition	Julia Kohler	6,827	0.29%	
Write-in		1	0.00%	

== Treasurer and Receiver-General ==
1960 Massachusetts Treasurer election
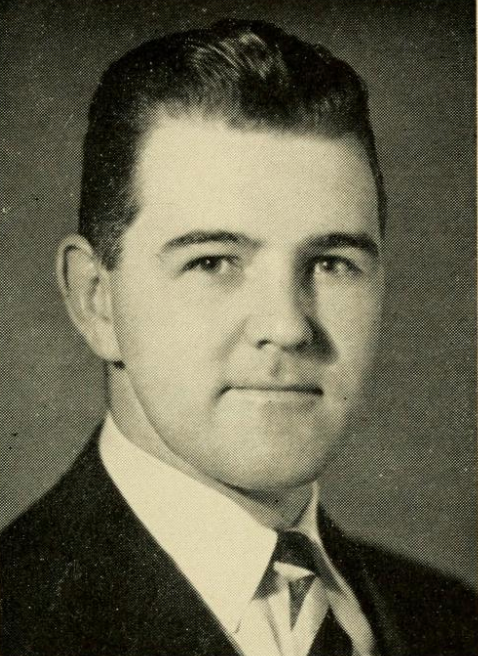

Nominee	John T. Driscoll	Walter J. Trybulski
Party	Democratic	Republican
Popular vote	1,338,202	941,904
Percentage	58.1%	40.9%
Treasurer and Receiver-General before election
John Francis Kennedy
Democratic
Elected Treasurer and Receiver-General
John T. Driscoll
Democratic

Incumbent Treasurer and Receiver-General John Francis Kennedy did not run for re-election as he instead ran for Governor.

In the Democratic primary, John T. Driscoll defeated Patrick F. McDonough, John B. Kennedy, George F. Hurley, John M. Kennedy, and Robert J. Sullivan.

Walter J. Trybulski defeated Francis Andrew Walsh for the Republican nomination.

Driscoll defeated Trybulski, Socialist Labor candidate Domenico DiGirolamo, and Prohibition candidate Warren Carberg in the general election.

=== Democratic primary ===
==== Candidates ====
- John T. Driscoll, State Representative
- George F. Hurley
- John B. Kennedy, Saugus Town Manager
- John M. Kennedy
- Patrick F. McDonough, member of the Boston City Council
- Robert J. Sullivan

==== Results ====
1960 Democratic primary for Treasurer and Receiver-General
Party	Candidate	Votes	%
Democratic	John T. Driscoll	204,299	39.36%
Democratic	Patrick F. McDonough	99,899	19.25%
Democratic	John B. Kennedy	83,799	16.14%
Democratic	George F. Hurley	61,094	11.77%
Democratic	John M. Kennedy	36,249	6.98%
Democratic	Robert J. Sullivan	33,760	6.50%
Write-in		3	0.00%

=== Republican primary ===
==== Candidates ====
- Walter J. Trybulski, former Mayor of Chicopee
- Francis Andrew Walsh

==== Results ====
Massachusetts Treasurer and Receiver-General Republican Primary, 1960
Party	Candidate	Votes	%
Republican	Walter J. Trybulski	137,479	67.10%
Republican	Francis Andrew Walsh	67,365	32.88%
Write-in		58	0.02%

=== General election ===
Massachusetts Treasurer and Receiver-General Election, 1960
Party	Candidate	Votes	%	±%
Democratic	John T. Driscoll	1,338,202	58.14%	
Republican	Walter J. Trybulski	941,904	40.92%	
Socialist Workers	Domenico DiGirolamo	13,772	0.60%	
Prohibition	Warren Carberg	7,846	0.34%	
Write-in		3	0.00%	

== Auditor ==
1960 Massachusetts Auditor election

Nominee	Thomas J. Buckley	Gardner Wardwell
Party	Democratic	Republican
Popular vote	1,530,715	774,772
Percentage	66.0%	33.4%
Auditor before election
Thomas J. Buckley
Democratic
Elected Auditor
Thomas J. Buckley
Democratic

Incumbent Auditor Thomas J. Buckley defeated John Hynes in the Democratic primary and Republican Gardner Wardwell, Socialist Labor candidate Arne Sortell, and Prohibition candidate John B. Lauder in the general election.

=== Democratic primary ===
==== Candidates ====
- Thomas J. Buckley, incumbent Auditor
- John Hynes, mayor of Boston

==== Results ====
Massachusetts Auditor Democratic Primary, 1960
Party	Candidate	Votes	%
Democratic	Thomas J. Buckley (incumbent)	414,524	82.49%
Democratic	John Hynes	88,013	17.51%
Write-in		7	0.00%

=== General election ===
Massachusetts Auditor Election, 1960
Party	Candidate	Votes	%	±%
Democratic	Thomas J. Buckley (incumbent)	1,530,715	66.00%	
Republican	Gardner Wardwell	774,772	33.41%	
Socialist Workers	Arne Sortell	7,897	0.34%	
Prohibition	John B. Lauder	5,787	0.25%	
Write-in		2	0.00%	

== United States Senator ==
Republican Leverett Saltonstall was re-elected over Democrat Thomas J. O'Connor, Socialist Labor candidate Lawrence Gilfedder, and Prohibition candidate Mark R. Shaw.

== See also ==
- 162nd Massachusetts General Court (1961–1962)
