= 1962 Massachusetts elections =

1962 Massachusetts general election
- November 6, 1962

Part of the 1962 United States elections

A Massachusetts general election was held on November 6, 1962, in the Commonwealth of Massachusetts.

The election included:

- statewide elections for United States Senator, Governor, Lieutenant Governor, Attorney General, Secretary of the Commonwealth, Treasurer, and Auditor;
- district elections for U.S. Representatives, State Representatives, State Senators, and Governor's Councillors; and
- ballot questions at the state and local levels.

Democratic and Republican candidates were selected in party primaries held on September 18, 1962.

== Governor ==
Democrat Endicott Peabody was elected over Republican incumbent John A. Volpe, Socialist Labor candidate Henning A. Blomen, and Prohibition candidate Guy S. Williams.

== Lieutenant governor ==
1962 Massachusetts Lieutenant Governor election
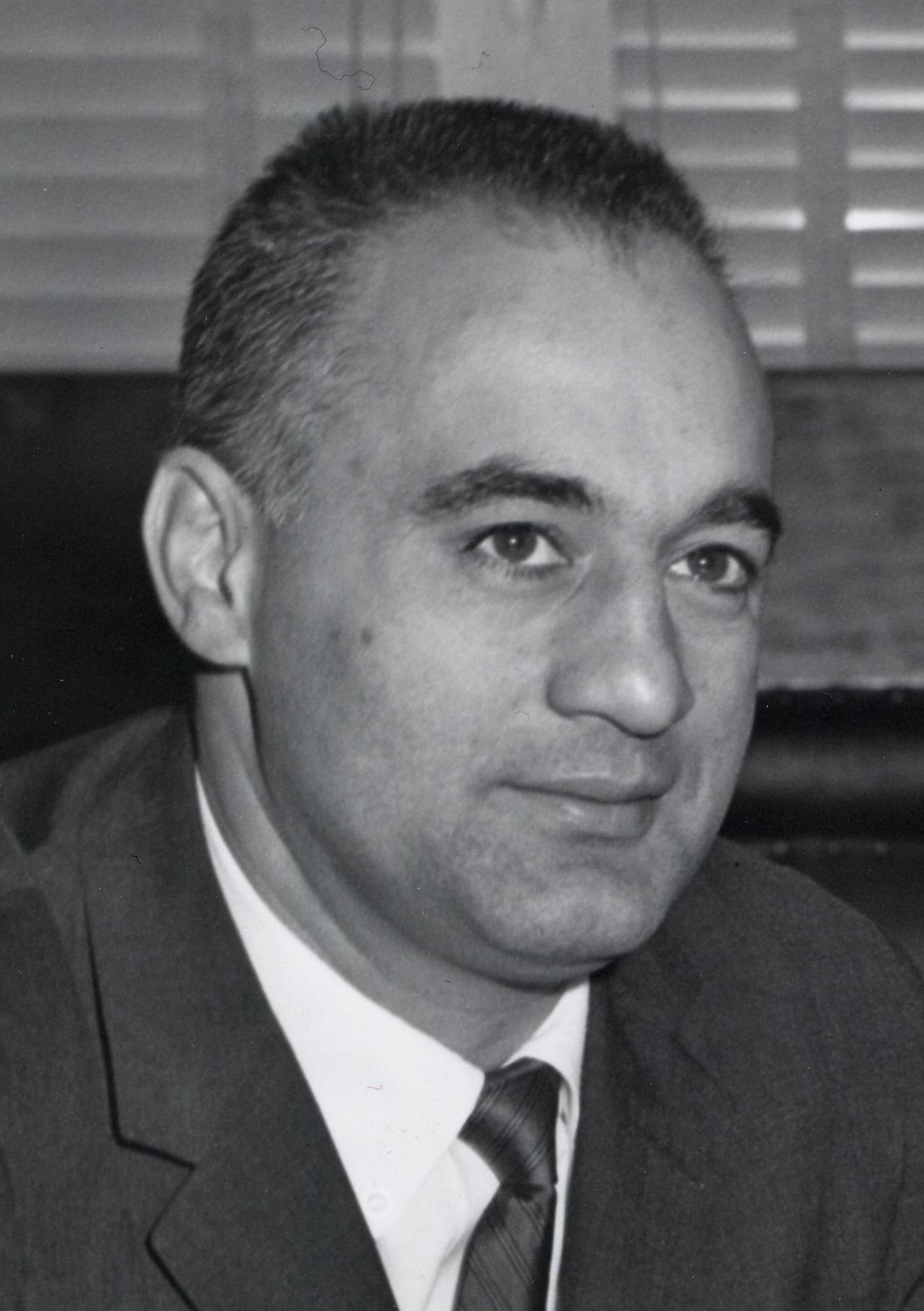

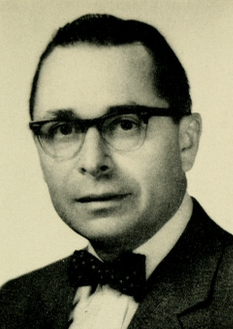
Nominee	Francis X. Bellotti	Francis W. Perry
Party	Democratic	Republican
Popular vote	1,037,704	970,157
Percentage	51.4%	48.1%
- County results Bellotti: 40–50% 50–60% 60–70% Perry: 50–60% 60–70% 70–80%
Lieutenant Governor before election
Edward F. McLaughlin Jr.
Democratic
Elected Lieutenant Governor
Francis X. Bellotti
Democratic

Democrat Francis X. Belotti was elected Lieutenant Governor over Republican Francis W. Perry, Socialist Labor candidate Francis A. Votano, and Prohibition candidate Gaetano T. Maratea.

=== Republican primary ===
==== Candidates ====
- Francis W. Perry, State Representative from Duxbury

==== Results ====
Perry was unopposed for the Republican nomination.

=== Democratic primary ===
==== Candidates ====
- Francis X. Bellotti, attorney and candidate for Norfolk County District Attorney in 1958
- Herbert L. Connolly, auto dealer

===== Disqualified =====
- Pasquale Caggiano, perennial candidate

===== Declined =====
- Edward F. McLaughlin Jr., incumbent Lt. Governor (to run for governor))

==== Results ====
1962 Massachusetts Democratic lieutenant gubernatorial primary
Party	Candidate	Votes	%
Democratic	Francis X. Belotti	401,428	57.02%
Democratic	Herbert L. Connolly	302,567	42.98%
Total votes		703,995	100.00%

=== General election ===
==== Results ====
1962 Massachusetts Lt. gubernatorial election
Party	Candidate	Votes	%	±%
Democratic	Francis X. Bellotti	1,037,704	51.42%	
Republican	Francis W. Perry	970,157	48.07%	
Socialist Labor	Francis A. Votano	8,666	0.43%	
Prohibition	Gaetano T. Maratea	1,508	0.08%	
Total votes		2,018,035	100.00%	

== Attorney general ==
1962 Massachusetts Attorney General election
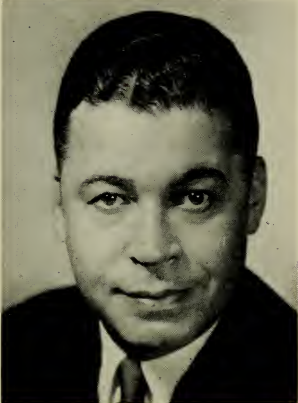

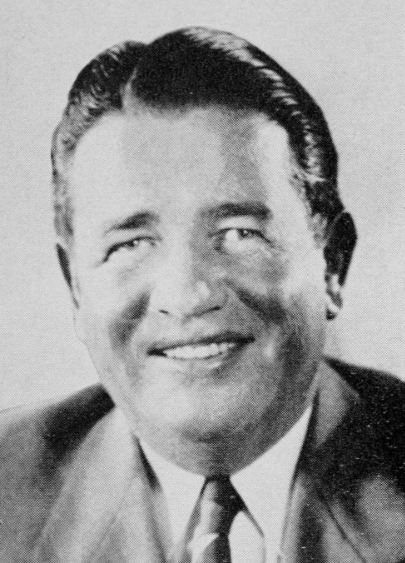
Nominee	Edward Brooke	Francis E. Kelly
Party	Republican	Democratic
Popular vote	1,143,065	883,710
Percentage	56.0%	43.3%
- County results Brooke: 50–60% 60–70% 70–80% Kelly: 50–60%
Attorney General before election
Edward J. McCormack, Jr.
Democratic
Elected Attorney General
Edward Brooke
Republican

Incumbent attorney general Edward J. McCormack, Jr. did not run for re-election. Republican Edward Brooke defeated Democrat Francis E. Kelly to win the open race. Brooke became the first elected African-American Attorney General of any state in American history.

=== Democratic primary ===
==== Candidates ====
- Francis E. Kelly, former Lieutenant Governor and Attorney General
- James R. Lawton, State Representative from Brockton
- Thomas L. McCormack
- Margaret McGovern, attorney and candidate for Secretary of the Commonwealth in 1960
- Matthew G. McGrath, Jr.

==== Results ====
Massachusetts Attorney General Democratic primary, 1962
Party	Candidate	Votes	%
Democratic	Francis E. Kelly	254,557	34.44%
Democratic	James R. Lawton	221,973	30.04%
Democratic	Margaret McGovern	146,067	19.77%
Democratic	Thomas L. McCormack	68,373	9.25%
Democratic	Matthew G. McGrath, Jr.	47,952	6.49%
Write-in		12	0.00%
Total votes			100.00%

=== Republican primary ===
==== Candidates ====
- Edward Brooke, Chairman of the Boston Finance Commission and nominee for Secretary of the Commonwealth in 1960
- Elliot Richardson, former U.S. Attorney for the District of Massachusetts

==== Results ====
Massachusetts Attorney General Republican primary, 1962
Party	Candidate	Votes	%
Republican	Edward Brooke	238,147	54.88%
Republican	Elliot Richardson	195,791	45.12%
Write-in		14	0.00%
Total votes			100.00%

=== General election ===
In the general election, Brooke defeated Kelly, Socialist Workers candidate Edgar E. Gaudet, and Prohibition candidate Howard B. Rand.

Massachusetts Attorney General Election, 1962
Party	Candidate	Votes	%	±%
Republican	Edward Brooke	1,143,065	55.98%	▲15.51
Democratic	Francis E. Kelly	883,710	43.28%	▼15.53
Socialist Workers	Edgar E. Gaudet	9,591	0.47%	▼0.03
Prohibition	Howard B. Rand	5,610	0.28%	▲0.06
Write-in		14	0.00%	Steady
Total votes		2,041,990	100.00%	

== Secretary of the Commonwealth ==
1962 Massachusetts Secretary of the Commonwealth election

Nominee	Kevin White	Harris Reynolds
Party	Democratic	Republican
Popular vote	1,250,467	621,894
Percentage	64.1%	36.6%
Secretary of the Commonwealth before election
Kevin White
Democratic
Elected Secretary of the Commonwealth
Kevin White
Democratic

Incumbent Secretary of the Commonwealth Kevin White, defeated Republican Harris Reynolds, Socialist Labor candidate John Erlandson, and Prohibition candidate Julia Kohler in the general election.

=== General election ===
==== Results ====
Massachusetts Secretary of the Commonwealth Election, 1962
Party	Candidate	Votes	%	±%
Democratic	Kevin White (incumbent)	1,250,467	64.10%	▲12.08
Republican	Harris Reynolds	713,708	36.58%	▼10.63
Socialist Workers	John Erlandson	9,433	0.48%	Steady
Prohibition	Julia Kohler	7,201	0.40%	▲0.11
Write-in		2	0.00%	Steady
Total votes			100.00%	

== Treasurer and Receiver-General ==
1962 Massachusetts Treasurer election
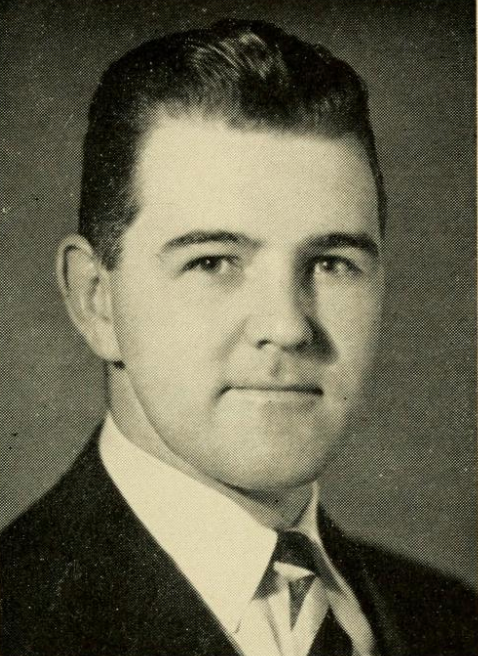

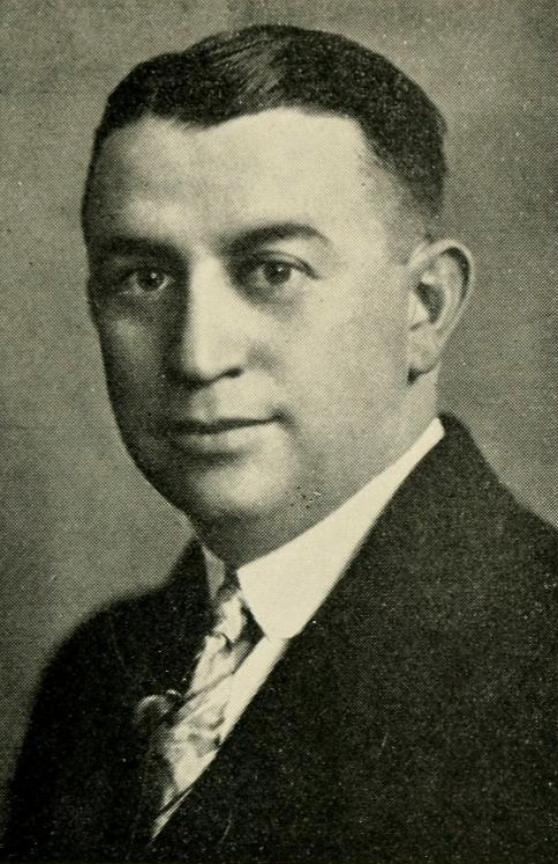
Nominee	John T. Driscoll	Joseph B. Grossman
Party	Democratic	Republican
Popular vote	1,225,754	744,115
Percentage	61.7%	37.4%
Treasurer and Receiver-General before election
John T. Driscoll
Democratic
Elected Treasurer and Receiver-General
John T. Driscoll
Democratic

=== Democratic primary ===
==== Candidates ====
- John T. Driscoll, incumbent Treasurer and Receiver-General
- John Francis Kennedy, former Treasurer and Receiver-General (1957–61) and candidate for governor in 1960
- John M. Kennedy

==== Results ====
Massachusetts Treasurer and Receiver-General Democratic Primary, 1962
Party	Candidate	Votes	%
Democratic	John T. Driscoll (incumbent)	464,731	65.98%
Democratic	John Francis Kennedy	190,522	27.05%
Democratic	John M. Kennedy	49,113	6.97%
Write-in		1	0.00%
Total votes			100.00%

=== Republican primary ===
==== Candidates ====
- Joseph B. Grossman, businessman and former State Representative
- Francis Andrew Walsh

==== Results ====
Massachusetts Treasurer and Receiver-General Republican Primary, 1962
Party	Candidate	Votes	%
Republican	Joseph B. Grossman	282,765	70.59%
Republican	Francis Andrew Walsh	117,793	29.14%
Write-in		3	0.00%
Total votes			100.00%

=== General election ===
==== Results ====
Massachusetts Treasurer and Receiver-General Election, 1962
Party	Candidate	Votes	%	±%
Democratic	John T. Driscoll	1,225,754	61.72%	▲3.58
Republican	Joseph B. Grossman	744,115	37.42%	▼3.50
Socialist Workers	Arne A. Sortell	9,039	0.46%	▼0.14
Prohibition	Isaac Goddard	7,074	0.36%	▲0.02
Write-in		6	0.00%	Steady
Total votes			100.00%	

== Auditor ==
1962 Massachusetts Auditor election

Nominee	Thomas J. Buckley	Phillip M. Walsh
Party	Democratic	Republican
Popular vote	1,343,625	627,701
Percentage	67.5%	31.6%
Auditor before election
Thomas J. Buckley
Democratic
Elected Auditor
Thomas J. Buckley
Democratic

Incumbent Auditor Thomas J. Buckley defeated Republican Phillip M. Walsh, Socialist Labor candidate Ethelbert Nevens, and Prohibition candidate Louise Metays in the general election.

Massachusetts Auditor General Election, 1962
Party	Candidate	Votes	%	±%
Democratic	Thomas J. Buckley (incumbent)	1,343,625	67.65%	▲1.65
Republican	Phillip M. Walsh	627,701	31.60%	▼2.81
Socialist Workers	Ethelbert Nevens	8,874	0.45%	▲0.11
Prohibition	Louise Metays	5,973	0.30%	▲0.05
Write-in		9	0.00%	Steady
Total votes		1,986,182	100.00%	

== United States Senator ==
Democrat Ted Kennedy was elected over Republican George C. Lodge, Independent H. Stuart Hughes, Socialist Labor candidate Lawrence Gilfedder, and Prohibition candidate Mark R. Shaw in a special election to fill the unexpired term of John F. Kennedy, who was elected President of the United States.
