= 1964 Massachusetts elections =

1964 Massachusetts general election
- November 3, 1964

Part of the 1964 United States elections

A Massachusetts general election was held on November 3, 1964, in the Commonwealth of Massachusetts.

The election included:

- statewide elections for United States Senator, Governor, Lieutenant Governor, Attorney General, Secretary of the Commonwealth, Treasurer, and Auditor;
- district elections for U.S. Representatives, State Representatives, State Senators, and Governor's Councillors; and
- ballot questions at the state and local levels.

Democratic and Republican candidates were selected in party primaries held on September 10, 1964.

This was the final election before the term of office for governor, lieutenant governor, attorney general, secretary of the commonwealth, treasurer, and auditor was extended from two to four years.

== Governor ==
Republican John A. Volpe was elected over Democrat Francis X. Bellotti, Socialist Labor candidate Francis A. Votano, and Prohibition candidate Guy S. Williams. Incumbent governor Endicott Peabody lost in the Democratic primary to Bellotti, his lieutenant governor.

== Lieutenant governor ==
1964 Massachusetts Lieutenant Governor election
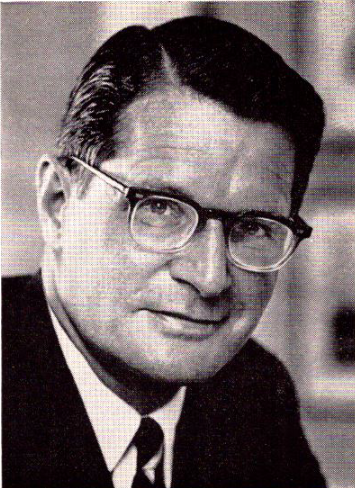

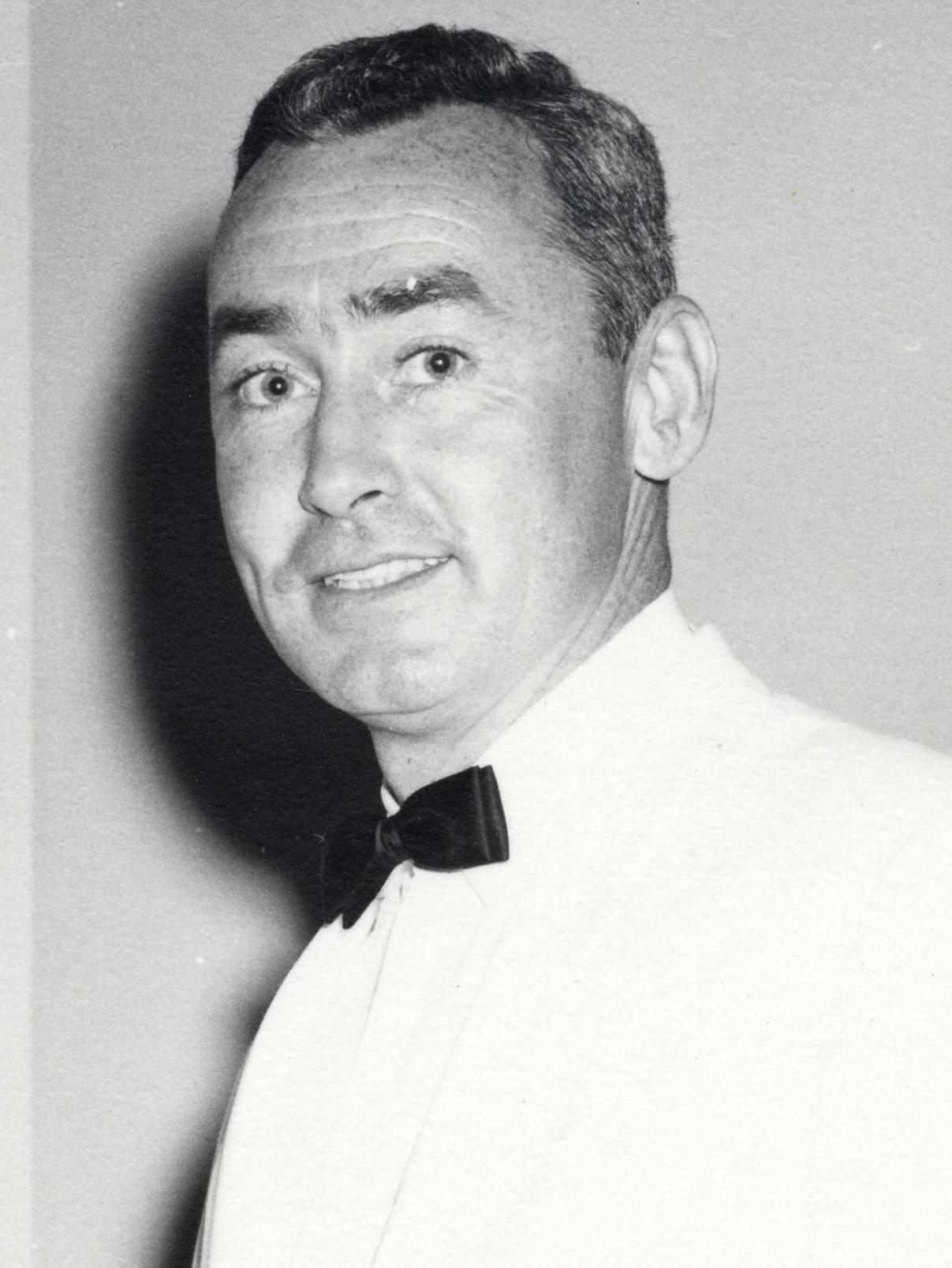
Nominee	Elliot Richardson	John W. Costello
Party	Republican	Democratic
Popular vote	1,121,985	1,097,380
Percentage	50.2%	49.1%
Lieutenant Governor before election
Francis X. Bellotti
Democratic
Elected Lieutenant Governor
Elliot Richardson
Republican

Republican Elliot L. Richardson was elected Lieutenant Governor over Democrat John W. Costello.

=== Republican primary ===
==== Candidates ====
- Elliott Richardson, former United States Attorney for the District of Massachusetts

==== Results ====
Richardson ran unopposed in the Republican primary for lieutenant governor.

=== Democratic primary ===
==== Candidates ====
- John W. Costello, member of the Massachusetts Governor's Council

===== Withdrew following convention =====
- Joseph E. McGuire, Worcester attorney

===== Withdrew at convention =====
- Joseph G. Bradley, state representative from Newton
- Edward F. Harrington, mayor of New Bedford
- George P. Macheras, Lowell City Councilor
- Rico Matera, former state representative from East Boston

===== Eliminated at convention =====
- Joseph Alecks
- James A. DeGuglielmo
- Daniel Dibble, mayor of Holyoke
- Thomas S. Eisenstadt, member of the Boston School Committee
- George H. O'Fannell, state representative
- Andre R. Sigourney, state representative from Nahant
- Mario Umana, state senator from East Boston
- Harold L. Vaughn

==== Convention ====
On the first ballot, Governor's Councillor John W. Costello led with 428 votes to Worcester attorney and Industrial Accident Board member Joseph E. McGuire's 404, state senator Mario Umana's 250, and state representative Joseph G. Bradley's 112. The other seven candidates received less than the 100 votes required to remain on the ballot and Bradley chose to drop out, which left Costello, McGuire, and Umana as the only remaining candidates. Costello led again on the second ballot, with 641 votes to McGuire's 600 and Umana's 343, but did not receive enough votes to win the nomination. The same happened on the third (687 votes for Costello to McGuire's 656 and Umana's 172). On the fourth ballot, Umana fell to 99 votes, which eliminated him from the contest. On the fifth and final ballot Costello won the party's endorsement by defeating McGuire 724 votes to 691.

Balloting
	1st	2nd	3rd	4th	5th
John W. Costello	428	641	687	?	724
Joseph E. McGuire	404	600	656	?	691
Mario Umana	250	343	172	99	—
Joseph G. Bradley	112	—	—	—	—

==== Results ====
Costello was unopposed for the nomination for lieutenant governor.

=== General election ===
1964 Massachusetts Lt. gubernatorial election
Party	Candidate	Votes	%	±%
Republican	Elliot L. Richardson	1,121,985	50.22%	
Democratic	John W. Costello	1,097,380	49.11%	
Socialist Labor	Edgar E. Gaudet	9,551	0.43%	
Prohibition	Prescott E. Grout	5,424	0.24%	
Write-in		10	0.00%	{{{change}}}
Total votes		2,234,340	100.00%	

== Attorney General ==
1964 Massachusetts Attorney General election
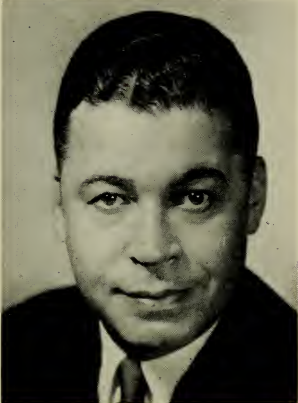

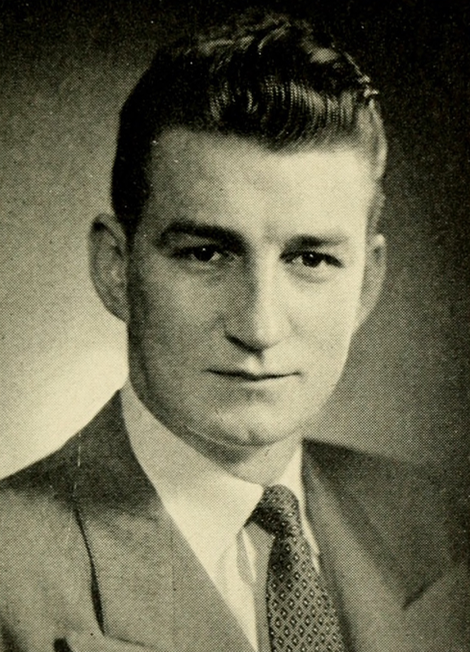
Nominee	Edward Brooke	James W. Hennigan Jr.
Party	Republican	Democratic
Popular vote	1,543,900	746,390
Percentage	67.2%	32.5%
Attorney General before election
Edward Brooke
Republican
Elected Attorney General
Edward Brooke
Republican

Incumbent Attorney General Edward Brooke defeated Democrat James W. Hennigan, Jr.

=== General election ===
==== Results ====
Massachusetts Attorney General Election, 1964
Party	Candidate	Votes	%	±%
Republican	Edward Brooke (incumbent)	1,543,900	67.18%	▲11.20
Democratic	James W. Hennigan, Jr.	746,390	32.48%	▼10.80
Socialist Workers	Willy N. Hogseth	4,716	0.21%	▼0.26
Prohibition	Howard B. Rand	3,030	0.13%	▼0.15
Write-in		4	0.00%	Steady

== Secretary of the Commonwealth ==
1964 Massachusetts Secretary of the Commonwealth election

Nominee	Kevin White	Wallace B. Crawford
Party	Democratic	Republican
Popular vote	1,572,871	621,894
Percentage	71.2%	28.1%
Secretary of the Commonwealth before election
Kevin White
Democratic
Elected Secretary of the Commonwealth
Kevin White
Democratic

Incumbent Secretary of the Commonwealth Kevin White defeated Republican Wallace B. Crawford.

=== General election ===
==== Results ====
1964 Secretary of the Commonwealth election
Party	Candidate	Votes	%	±%
Democratic	Kevin White (incumbent)	1,572,871	71.20%	▲7.10
Republican	Wallace B. Crawford	621,894	28.15%	▼8.43
Socialist Workers	Fred M. Ingersoll	8,369	0.38%	▼0.10
Prohibition	Julia B. Kohler	6,074	0.28%	▼0.12
Write-in		7	0.00%	Steady

== Treasurer and Receiver-General ==
1964 Massachusetts Treasurer election
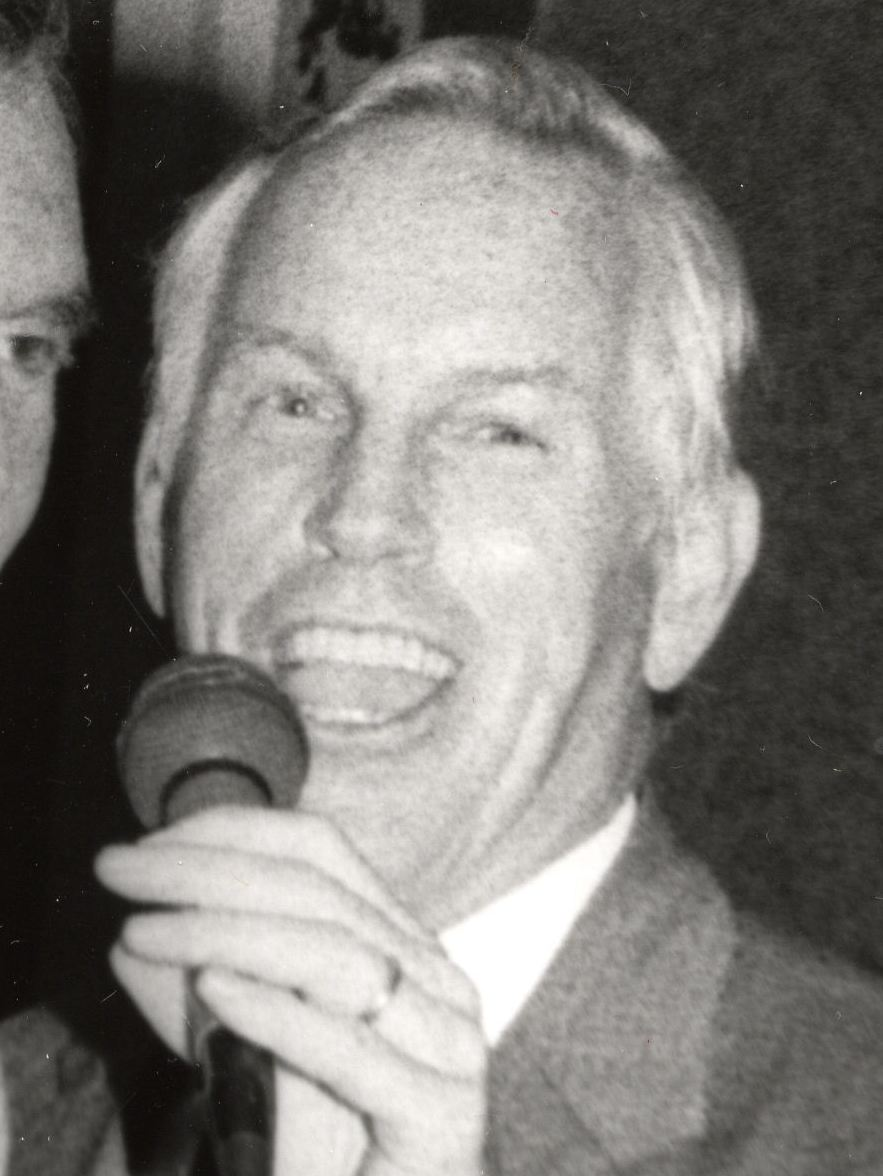

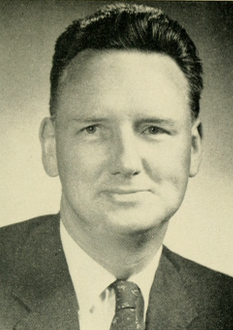
Nominee	Robert Q. Crane	Robert C. Hahn
Party	Democratic	Republican
Popular vote	1,390,921	762,593
Percentage	61.2%	35.2%
Treasurer and Receiver-General before election
John T. Driscoll
Democratic
Elected Treasurer and Receiver-General
Robert Q. Crane
Democratic

Incumbent Treasurer and Receiver-General John T. Driscoll did not run for re-election as he had been appointed Chairman of the Massachusetts Turnpike Authority.

Robert Q. Crane defeated Republican Robert C. Hahn in the general election.

=== Democratic primary ===
==== Candidates ====
- John J. Buckley, Mayor of Lawrence and member of the Governor's Council
- Robert Q. Crane, state representative from Brighton
- Louise Day Hicks, member of the Boston School Committee
- John Francis Kennedy, former Treasurer and Receiver-General (1955–61)

==== Results ====
Massachusetts Treasurer and Receiver-General Democratic Primary, 1964
Party	Candidate	Votes	%
Democratic	Robert Q. Crane	238,629	35.87%
Democratic	Louise Day Hicks	163,201	24.53%
Democratic	John Francis Kennedy	139,736	21.01%
Democratic	John J. Buckley	123,519	18.57%
Write-in		175	0.03%

=== General election ===
1964 Treasurer and Receiver-General election
Party	Candidate	Votes	%	±%
Democratic	Robert Q. Crane	1,390,921	64.16%	▲2.36
Republican	Robert C. Hahn	762,593	35.18%	▼2.34
Socialist Workers	Arne A. Sortell	8,017	0.37%	▼0.09
Prohibition	Warren C. Carberg	6,295	0.29%	▼0.07
Write-in		3	0.00%	Steady

== Auditor ==
1966 Massachusetts Auditor election
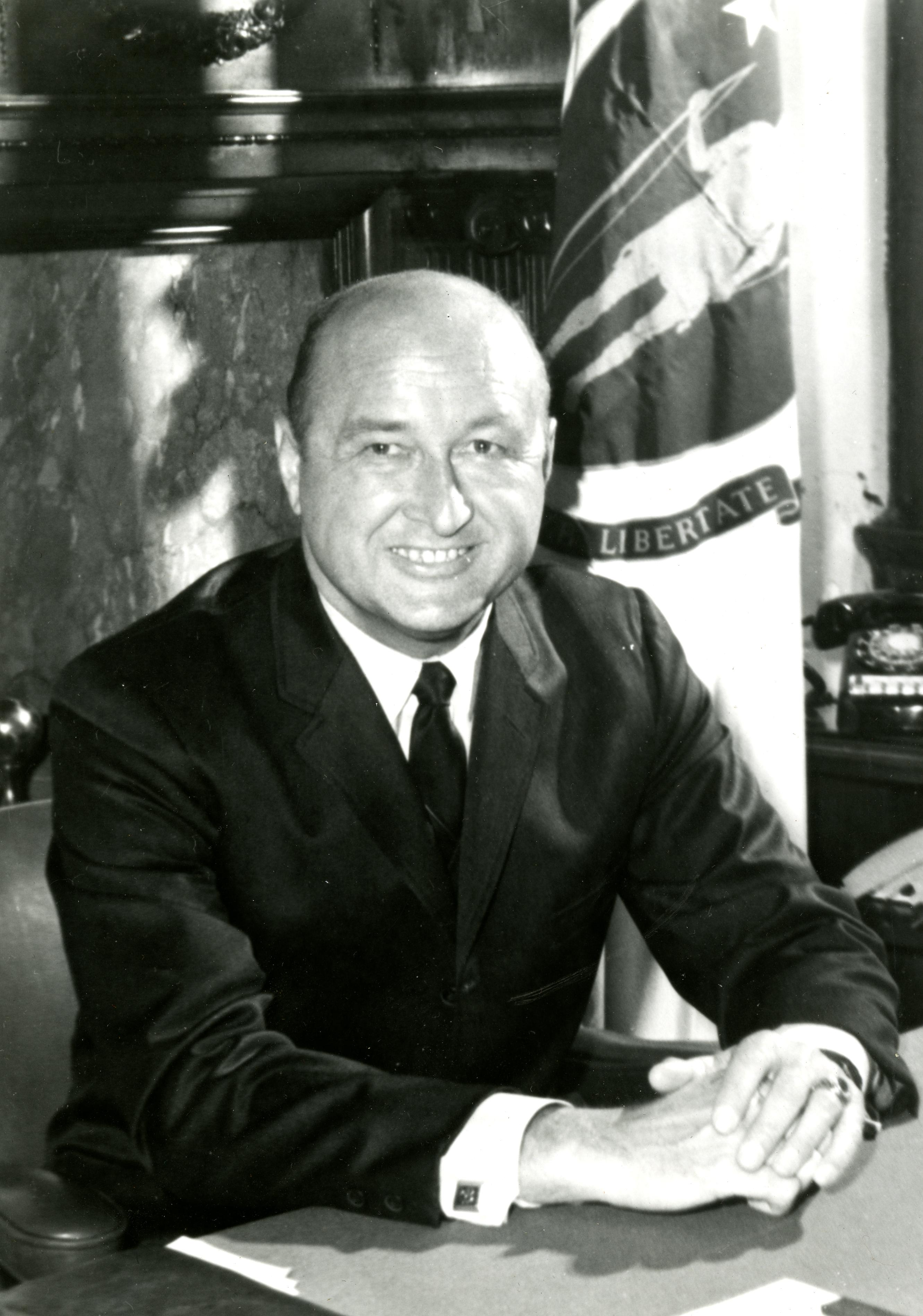

Nominee	Thaddeus Buczko	Elwynn Miller
Party	Democratic	Republican
Popular vote	1,247,674	868,813
Percentage	58.4%	40.7%
Auditor before election
Thomas J. Buckley
Democratic
Elected Auditor
Thaddeus M. Buczko
Democratic

Incumbent Auditor Thomas J. Buckley died on September 9, 1964, the night before the Democratic primary. Because no sticker campaign received enough votes to win the nomination, the Democratic State Committee chose Thaddeus M. Buczko to succeed Buckley for the Democratic nomination.

In the general election, Buczko defeated Republican Elwynn Miller.

=== Democratic primary ===
==== Candidates ====
- Thomas J. Buckley, incumbent (died September 9, 1964)

==== Results ====
1964 Democratic primary for Auditor
Party	Candidate	Votes	%
Democratic	Thomas J. Buckley (inc., deceased)	375,917	95.95%
Write-in		4,355	1.11%
Democratic	Rocco Antonelli (write-in)	2,859	0.73%
Democratic	Richard J. Mulhern (write-in)	2,839	0.73%
Democratic	Peter F. Hines (write-in)	2,837	0.72%
Democratic	James Linchan (write-in)	2,545	0.65%
Democratic	Raymond Rigney (write-in)	436	0.11%

==== Committee vote ====
Democratic Committee Vote for Replacement Nominee
Party	Candidate	Votes	%
Democratic	Thaddeus M. Buczko	40	56.34%
Democratic	John J. Buckley	23	32.39%
Democratic	Louise Day Hicks	7	9.86%
Democratic	Peter F. Hines	1	1.41%

=== General election ===
==== Results ====
1964 Massachusetts Auditor election
Party	Candidate	Votes	%	±%
Democratic	Thaddeus M. Buczko (incumbent)	1,247,674	58.38%	▼9.27
Republican	Elwynn Miller	868,813	40.66%	▲9.06
Prohibition	John C. Hedges	11,368	0.53%	▲0.23
Socialist Workers	Ethelbert L. Nevens	9,175	0.43%	▼0.02
Write-in		9	0.00%	Steady

== United States Senate ==
Democrat Ted Kennedy was re-elected over Republican Howard J. Whitmore, Jr., Socialist Labor candidate Lawrence Gilfedder, and Prohibition candidate Grace F. Luder.
