= 1960 Massachusetts gubernatorial election =

- November 8, 1960
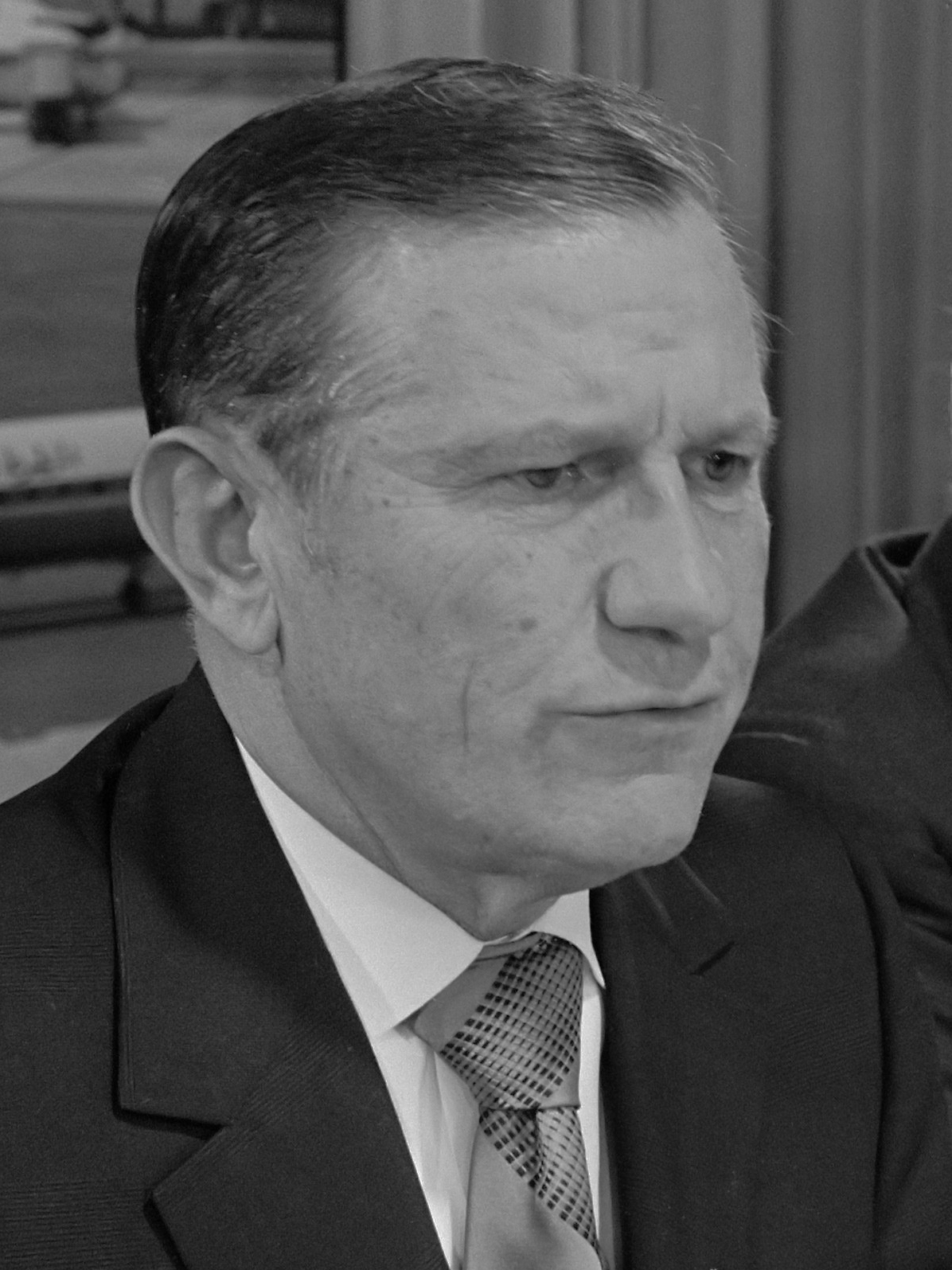

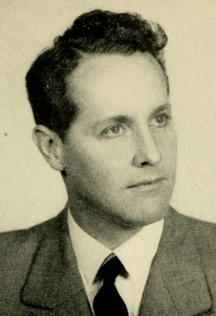
Nominee	John A. Volpe	Joseph D. Ward
Party	Republican	Democratic
Popular vote	1,269,295	1,130,810
Percentage	52.51%	46.79%
- Volpe: 50–60% 60–70% 70–80% 80–90% Ward: 50–60% 60–70% 70–80%
Governor before election
Foster Furcolo
Democratic
Elected Governor
John A. Volpe
Republican

The 1960 Massachusetts gubernatorial election was held on November 8, 1960. John A. Volpe was elected governor of Massachusetts to replace Foster Furcolo. Volpe defeated Democrat Joseph D. Ward in the race. Also running were Henning A. Blomen of the Socialist Labor Party of America and Guy S. Williams of the Prohibition Party.

In the race for lieutenant governor, Democrat Edward F. McLaughlin, Jr., defeated Republican Augustus Gardner Means, Prohibition candidate Thomas Maratea, and Socialist Labor candidate Francis A. Votano.

== Democratic primary ==
=== Candidates ===
- Francis E. Kelly, attorney general
- John Francis Kennedy, treasurer and receiver-general
- Alfred Magaletta, realtor
- Endicott Peabody, former member of the Massachusetts Governor's Council
- Gabriel Piemonte, former Boston city councilor
- Joseph D. Ward, Massachusetts secretary of the Commonwealth

==== Declined ====
- Foster Furcolo, incumbent governor (to run for US Senate)

=== Results ===
Massachusetts Democratic gubernatorial primary, 1960
Party	Candidate	Votes	%
Democratic	Joseph D. Ward	180,848	30.23%
Democratic	Endicott Peabody	152,762	26.53%
Democratic	Francis E. Kelly	98,107	16.40%
Democratic	Robert F. Murphy	76,577	12.80%
Democratic	John Francis Kennedy	52,972	8.85%
Democratic	Gabriel Piemonte	28,199	4.71%
Democratic	Alfred Magaletta	8,826	1.48%
Write-in	All others	3	0.00%
Total votes		598,294	100.00%

== Republican primary ==
=== Candidates ===
- John Volpe, former Massachusetts commissioner of public works and administrator of the Federal Highway Administration

==== Withdrew following convention ====
- Frank S. Giles, minority leader of the Massachusetts House of Representatives
- Philip A. Graham, state senator from Hamilton
- Howard J. Whitmore, Jr., former mayor of Newton

=== Results ===
Following his endorsement at the state convention, Volpe was unopposed for the Republican nomination.

== General election ==
=== Results ===
Massachusetts gubernatorial election, 1960
Party	Candidate	Votes	%	±%
Republican	John A. Volpe	1,269,295	52.51%	
Democratic	Joseph D. Ward	1,130,810	46.79%	
Socialist Labor	Henning A. Blomen	9,474	0.39%	
Prohibition	Guy S. Williams	7,396	0.31%	
Total votes		2,416,975	100.00%	

==== Results by county ====
County	John Volpe Republican		Joseph Ward Democratic		All others		Margin		Total votes
County	#	%	#	%	#	%	#	%	Total votes
Barnstable	23,006	70.0%	9,702	29.5%	147	0.5%	13,304	40.5%	32,855
Berkshire	36,038	53.9%	30,512	45.6%	338	0.5%	5,526	8.3%	66,888
Bristol	77,902	40.8%	111,851	58.6%	1,103	0.6%	-33,949	-17.8%	190,856
Dukes	2,223	69.5%	951	29.7%	23	0.7%	20,219	39.8%	3,197
Essex	153,786	53.1%	133,567	46.1%	2,299	0.8%	20,219	7.0%	289,652
Franklin	16,933	61.1%	10,673	38.5%	108	0.4%	6,260	22.6%	27,714
Hampden	108,696	57.5%	79,146	41.9%	1,210	0.6%	29,550	15.6%	189,052
Hampshire	25,136	56.5%	19,091	42.9%	264	0.5%	6,045	13.6%	44,491
Middlesex	334,956	56.5%	253,854	42.8%	4,528	0.8%	81,102	13.7%	593,338
Nantucket	1,334	72.6%	497	27.0%	7	0.4%	837	45.6%	1,838
Norfolk	153,267	60.6%	97,889	38.7%	1,783	0.7%	55,378	21.9%	252,939
Plymouth	70,412	60.4%	45,380	39.0%	696	0.6%	25,032	21.4%	116,488
Suffolk	133,480	41.1%	189,367	58.3%	2,121	0.6%	-55,887	17.2%	324,968
Worcester	132,126	46.7%	148,330	52.5%	2,243	0.8%	-16,204	-5.8%	282,699
Totals	1,269,295	52.5%	1,130,810	46.8%	17,028	0.7%	138,485	5.7%	2,417,133

Counties that flipped from Democratic to Republican

- Berkshire
- Essex
- Hampden
- Hampshire
- Middlesex

== See also ==
- 1959–1960 Massachusetts legislature
