= Robert Q. Crane =

American politician (1926–2018)

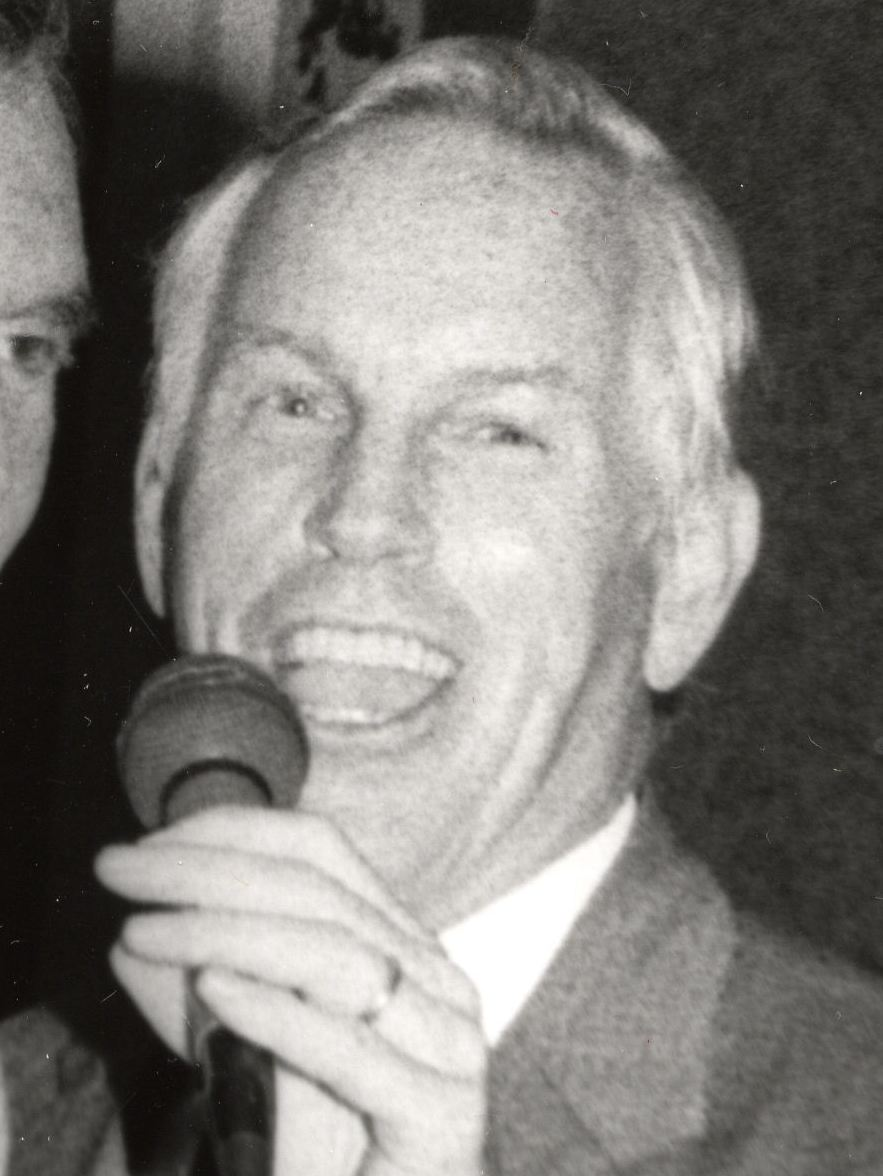
- Crane in the 1980s

53rd Treasurer and Receiver-General of Massachusetts
- In office 1964–1991
- Governor: Endicott Peabody; John Volpe; Francis Sargent; Michael Dukakis; Edward J. King
- Preceded by: John T. Driscoll
- Succeeded by: Joe Malone

Chairperson of the Massachusetts Democratic Party
- In office April 4, 1971 – October 30, 1971
- Preceded by: David E. Harrison
- Succeeded by: Charles Flaherty

Personal details
- Born: Robert Quentin Crane; March 21, 1926 Providence, Rhode Island, U.S.
- Died: January 5, 2018 (aged 91)
- Party: Democratic
- Education: Boston College

Robert Quentin Crane (March 21, 1926 – January 5, 2018) was an American politician who served as Treasurer and Receiver-General of Massachusetts from 1964 to 1991. He was credited with starting the Massachusetts Lottery.

== Early life ==
Crane was born in 1926 in Providence, Rhode Island. He received his education at English High School of Boston and Boston College. Crane served in the United States Marine Corps during World War II.

== Career ==
Crane served in the Massachusetts House of Representatives from 1957 to 1964. He served as the chairman of the Massachusetts Democratic Party. Crane was appointed state treasurer in 1964. He defeated Louise Day Hicks, John Francis Kennedy, and John J. Buckley for the Democratic party's nomination in 1964. He went on to easily defeat Republican Robert C. Hahn in the general election.

In 1971, became the founding chairman of the Massachusetts State Lottery. The closest Crane came to losing his office was in 1974 when he defeated Charles Mark Furcolo, a Boston attorney and son of former governor John Foster Furcolo, 51%-49% in the Democratic primary. He retired from politics in 1991, amid accusations of patronage and nepotism.

== Death ==
Crane died on January 5, 2018, aged 91.

Political offices
Preceded by John T. Driscoll	Treasurer and Receiver-General of Massachusetts; 1964–1991	Succeeded by Joe Malone
Party political offices
Preceded by John T. Driscoll	Democratic nominee for Treasurer and Receiver-General of Massachusetts; 1964, 1966, 1970, 1974, 1978, 1982, 1986	Succeeded by William F. Galvin
Preceded by David E. Harrison	Chairman of the Massachusetts Democratic Party; April 4, 1971 – October 30, 1971	Succeeded by Charles Flaherty
