= Francis W. Perry =

American realtor and politician (1913–1985)

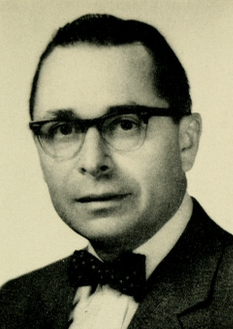

Member of the Massachusetts House of Representatives for the 2nd Plymouth district
- In office 1959–1962
- Preceded by: Nathaniel Tilden
- Succeeded by: Harold H. Wicher

Personal details
- Born: April 21, 1913 Rockland, Massachusetts, U.S.
- Died: October 18, 1985 (aged 72) Duxbury, Massachusetts, U.S.
- Party: Republican
- Education: Harvard College

Francis Whitney Perry (April 21, 1913 – October 18, 1985) was an American realtor and politician who was a member of the Massachusetts House of Representatives from 1959 to 1962 and the Republican Party nominee for Lieutenant Governor of Massachusetts in 1962.

== Early life ==
Perry was born in Rockland, Massachusetts on April 21, 1913. He graduated from Rockland Senior High School and received his Bachelor of Arts from Harvard College in 1935. He served in the United States Army during World War II.

== Business career ==
Perry was an executive with A. W. Perry, a commercial real estate firm founded by his grandfather in 1884. Their properties included the Wigglesworth Building and the South Shore Industrial Park. He was president of the Greater Boston Real Estate Board from 1957 to 1958 and was named Massachusetts realtor of the year in 1958.

== Politics ==
Perry held numerous public offices in Duxbury, Massachusetts, including town moderator, selectman, assessor, chairman of the board of health, and chairman of the finance committee. He decided to run for the state legislature after a local newspaper erroneously named him a candidate for the office. He represented the 2nd Plymouth district in the Massachusetts House of Representatives and 1959–1960 and 1961–1962 Massachusetts legislatures. He served as chairman of the Republican Party's job opportunity committee. In 1960 and 1961, he exposed sweetheart deal in public parking lot leases made by the division of waterways and divisions of public works.

Perry was a candidate for Lieutenant Governor of Massachusetts in 1962. He was unopposed for the Republican nomination, but lost to Democrat Francis Bellotti 51% to 48%. He was a candidate for the Republican nomination in the 1964 Massachusetts gubernatorial election. He lost the convention vote to John A. Volpe, but announced he would challenge Volpe in the primaries. On July 8, 1964, he withdrew from the race to allow Volpe to concentrate his efforts on the November election.

== Personal life and death ==
Perry had three daughters with his wife, the former Rachel Holmes. He was a member of the American Legion, Veterans of Foreign Wars, Old Colony Club, and Harvard Club of Boston. Perry died on October 18, 1985, at his home in Duxbury after a long illness.

Party political offices
Preceded by Augustus Gardner Means	Republican nominee for Lieutenant Governor of Massachusetts; 1962	Succeeded by Elliot Richardson
