= Walter J. Trybulski =

American politician

Mayor of Chicopee, Massachusetts
- In office 1952–1955
- Preceded by: Edward O. Bourbeau
- Succeeded by: Walter M. Grocki

Personal details
- Born: Charlestown, New Hampshire, U.S.
- Died: January 13, 1989 (aged 84) Chicopee, Massachusetts, U.S.
- Party: Republican
- Education: Northeastern University School of Law
- Occupation: Attorney; Politician

Walter Jacob Trybulski was an American politician who served as mayor of Chicopee, Massachusetts, and was the Republican nominee for Massachusetts State Treasurer in 1960.

== Early life ==
Trybulski was born Charlestown, New Hampshire. He was the oldest of 12 children. In 1911 the family moved to Chicopee. Trybulski dropped out of high school his junior year in order to become a priest in the Franciscan Order. He studied at St. John's Seminary in Buffalo, New York, for two years before returning to Chicopee to help his family financially by working in a factory.

== Political career ==
From 1935 to 1940, Trybulski was a member of the Chicopee board of alderman. From 1942 to 1950 he served as city treasurer. From 1952 to 1956 he was the city's mayor. As mayor, Trybulski successfully lobbied the Strategic Air Command to build its center at Westover Air Force Base, which expanded the city's population and economy.

In 1960, Trybulski was the Republican nominee for Massachusetts State Treasurer. He was the first Polish-American to win nomination for a statewide office in Massachusetts. He lost the general election to Democrat John T. Driscoll 58% to 41%.

From 1964 to 1974, Trybulski was a member of the state's Industrial Accident Board.

== Legal career ==
While serving on the Chicopee board of alderman, Trybulski became interested in law. He attended night classes at Northeastern University School of Law's Springfield campus and received a law degree in 1942. Trybulski specialized in workers' compensation cases. He maintained a private law until his retirement in 1986.

== Death ==
Trybulski died of heart failure on January 13, 1989, in Chicopee.

== See also ==
- List of mayors of Chicopee, Massachusetts

Party political offices
| Preceded by John Yerxa | Republican nominee for Treasurer and Receiver-General of Massachusetts; 1960 | Succeeded by Joseph B. Grossman |
