= 1964 Massachusetts gubernatorial election =

- November 3, 1964
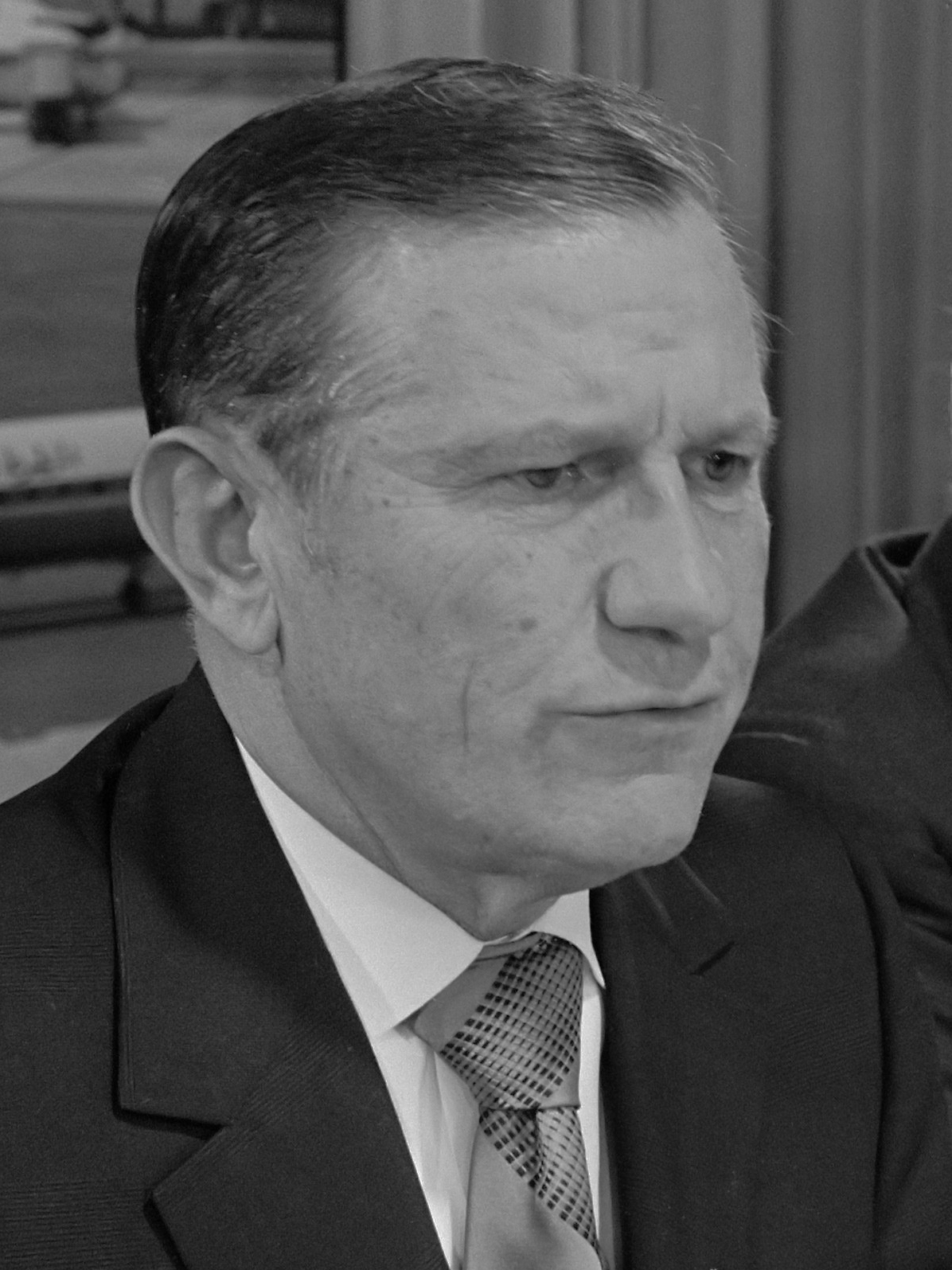

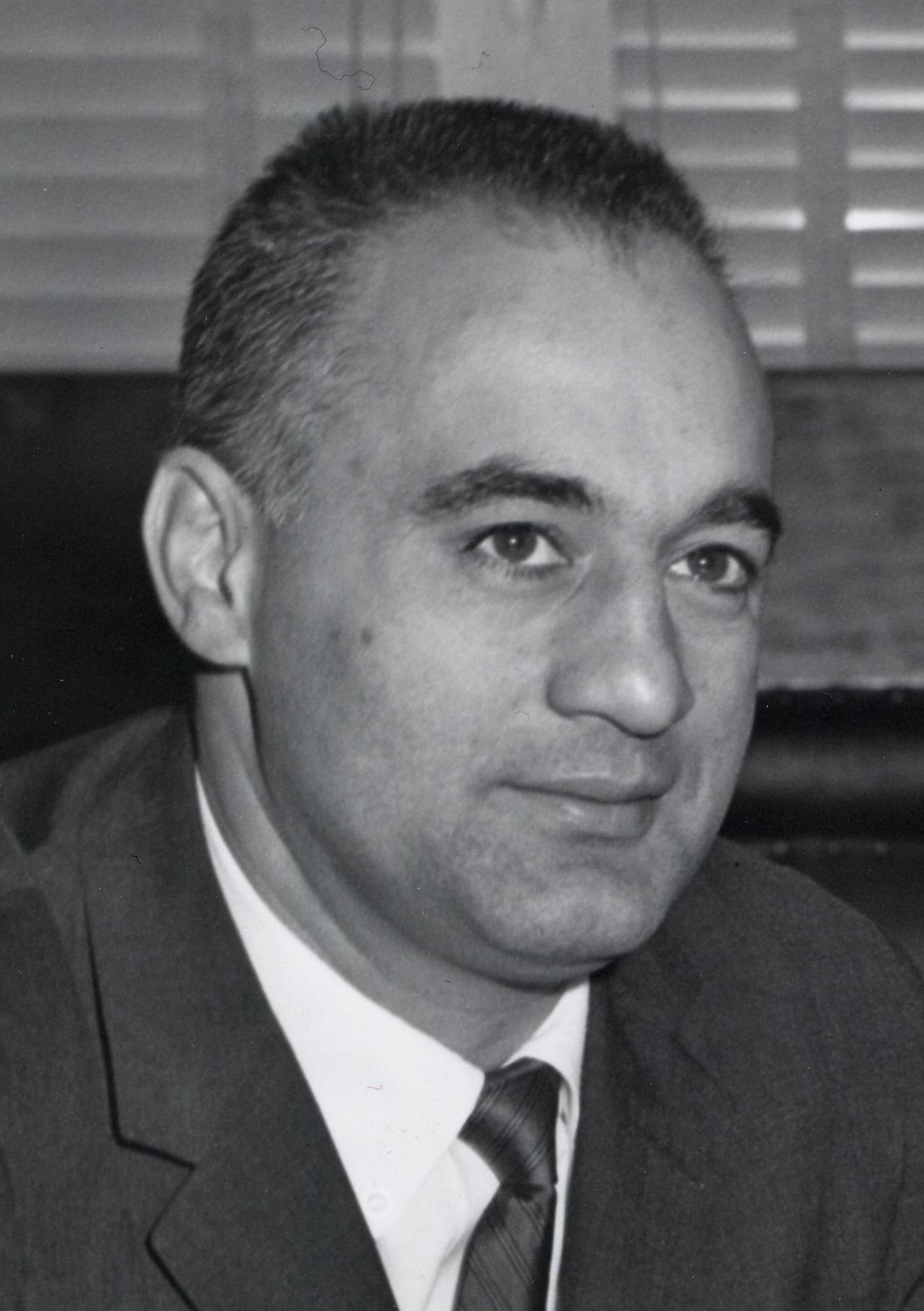
Nominee	John Volpe	Francis Bellotti
Party	Republican	Democratic
Popular vote	1,176,462	1,153,416
Percentage	50.27%	49.29%
- Volpe: 40–50% 50–60% 60–70% 70–80% 80–90% Bellotti: 40–50% 50–60% 60–70% 70–80%
Governor before election
Endicott Peabody
Democratic
Elected Governor
John Volpe
Republican

The 1964 Massachusetts gubernatorial election was held on November 3, 1964. Incumbent Governor Endicott Peabody ran for re-election, but was defeated by then-Lieutenant Governor Francis X. Bellotti in the Democratic Party primary. Bellotti went on to lose the general election to former Governor John Volpe.

The race between Volpe and Bellotti was the first time in Massachusetts history that the two major parties backed sons of Italian immigrants for governor.

This was the final election held before the governor's term of office was extended from two to four years.

== Democratic primary ==
=== Candidates ===
- Francis Bellotti, lieutenant governor
- Pasquale Caggiano, former state representative from Lynn and perennial candidate
- John J. Droney, Middlesex County district attorney
- Endicott Peabody, incumbent governor

==== Declined ====
- Robert F. Kennedy, U.S. attorney general and brother of John F. Kennedy (ran for U.S. Senate in New York)

=== Results ===
1964 Democratic gubernatorial primary
Party	Candidate	Votes	%
Democratic	Francis X. Bellotti	363,675	49.61%
Democratic	Endicott Peabody (incumbent)	336,780	45.94%
Democratic	John J. Droney	27,357	3.73%
Democratic	Pasquale Caggiano	5,250	0.72%
Total votes		733,062	100.00%

== Republican primary ==
=== Candidates ===
- John Volpe, former governor

==== Defeated at convention ====
- Philip A. Graham, state senator from Hamilton and Senate minority leader
- Francis W. Perry, state representative from Duxbury and nominee for lieutenant governor in 1962

==== Withdrew ====
- Edward Brooke, attorney general of Massachusetts (withdrew ahead of convention; ran for re-election)

=== Results ===
Volpe ran unopposed in the Republican primary.

== General election ==
=== Candidates ===
- Francis Bellotti, lieutenant governor (Democratic)
- John Volpe, former governor (Republican)
- Francis A. Votano (Socialist Labor)
- Guy S. Williams (Prohibition)

=== Results ===
Volpe defeated Bellotti by less than 25,000 votes. Volpe's victory came in a year in which Democrats gained seats in the United States House of Representatives and Senate and Lyndon Johnson won the presidential election in a landslide.

1964 Massachusetts gubernatorial election
Party	Candidate	Votes	%	±%
Republican	John A. Volpe	1,176,462	50.27%	
Democratic	Francis X. Bellotti	1,153,416	49.29%	
Socialist Labor	Francis A. Votano	6,273	0.27%	
Prohibition	Guy S. Williams	3,713	0.16%	
Write-in	All others	266	0.01%	

==== Results by county ====
County	John Volpe Republican		Francis Bellotti Democratic		All others		Margin		Total votes
County	#	%	#	%	#	%	#	%	Total votes
Barnstable	24,007	67.9%	11,228	31.8%	116	0.4%	12,779	36.1%	35,351
Berkshire	36,650	57.7%	26,475	41.7%	423	0.7%	10,175	16.0%	63,548
Bristol	73,560	39.5%	111,818	60.1%	705	0.4%	-38,258	-20.6%	186,083
Dukes	1,894	59.4%	1,285	40.3%	11	0.4%	609	19.1%	3,190
Essex	138,334	48.9%	143,051	50.6%	1,355	0.5%	-4,717	-1.7%	282,740
Franklin	13,302	51.9%	12,198	47.6%	128	0.5%	1,104	4.3%	25,628
Hampden	83,554	47.3%	92,209	52.2%	1,035	0.5%	-8,655	-4.9%	176,798
Hampshire	21,829	50.2%	21,414	49.3%	198	0.4%	415	0.9%	43,441
Middlesex	319,252	55.3%	255,061	44.2%	2,641	0.5%	64,191	11.1%	576,954
Nantucket	1,114	63.6%	635	36.2%	3	0.2%	479	27.4%	1,752
Norfolk	147,298	57.5%	108,180	42.2%	900	0.3%	39,118	15.3%	256,378
Plymouth	66,579	55.1%	53,785	44.5%	393	0.4%	12,794	10.6%	120,757
Suffolk	120,013	40.6%	174,571	59.0%	1,289	0.4%	-54,558	-18.4%	295,873
Worcester	129,076	47.5%	141,506	52.1%	1,052	0.4%	-12,430	25.2%	271,634
Totals	1,176,462	50.3%	1,153,416	49.3%	10,252	0.4%	12,046	1.0%	2,340,130

Counties that flipped from Republican to Democratic

- Essex

== See also ==
- 1963–1964 Massachusetts legislature
