= Rick Ahearn =

American political and corporate consultant (1949–2023)

- Ahearn the day Reagan was shot, March 30, 1981
- Born: Frederick Leonard Ahearn; November 6, 1949; Boston, Massachusetts, U.S.
- Died: November 14, 2023 (aged 74); New Bedford, Massachusetts, U.S.
- Education: Boston College (BA)
- Occupation: Political consultant
- Political party: Republican (after 1972)
- Other political affiliations: Democratic (before 1972)
- Spouse: Pamela Gardner (m. 1990; died 2007)

Frederick Leonard Ahearn (November 6, 1949 – November 14, 2023) was an American political and corporate consultant who served as executive vice president of Potomac Communications Strategies in Alexandria, Virginia. He is best known for his long service as lead advance man for Ronald Reagan, as a candidate in 1979–1980 and for most of his two terms as president; he was standing close to Reagan during his attempted assassination on March 30, 1981. Ahearn was also a senior adviser and planner for the presidential funeral and burial of Reagan (in 2004), as well as Jack Kemp (in 2009) and First Lady Nancy Reagan (in 2016). In all, he served five U.S. presidents and six vice presidents, and aided 14 presidential campaigns from 1968 to 2016.

== Early life and political jobs ==
Frederick Leonard Ahearn was born in Boston on November 6, 1949, the son of Francis X. Ahearn, one-time president of the Boston City Council and first deputy Secretary of the Commonwealth of Massachusetts, and Doris E. (Johnson) Ahearn. He grew up in Chestnut Hill, Massachusetts. At age 9, he handed out circulars promoting Boston Democrats; as a teenager, he organized crowds for political rallies. He attended Boston Latin School, graduated from Brighton High School, and studied marketing at Boston College.

His first political job was for Mayor John Collins. At the age of 19, he worked on the presidential campaign of Democratic vice president Hubert H. Humphrey, advancing the nominee's September 1968 rally in downtown Boston with Senator Kennedy. At 21, he worked for Republican governor Francis Sargent. He again aided Humphrey in his 1972 Democratic primary campaign; however, Ahearn (raised in a devout Catholic home) was revulsed by the liberalism of eventual Democratic nominee George McGovern, and switched his allegiance to Republican Richard Nixon. He left college to serve as executive director of Democrats for Nixon in New England (under Collins), and later to organize Democrats for Nixon in California. After the Republican's landslide victory, he continued his political work for Nixon, working in the White House as a political aide in several special Congressional elections in 1973 and 1974.

In 1976, Ahearn served as Northeast regional political director for the President Ford Committee, alongside Haley Barbour (who oversaw the South).

== Reagan administration ==
In 1979 and 1980, he served as advance man for candidate Ronald Reagan. He first joined the Reagan Presidential Advance Office on January 20, 1981, as a staff assistant to the President.

=== Assassination attempt ===
Ahearn was the lead White House advance man for President Reagan's speech to the AFL–CIO at the Washington Hilton Hotel on March 30, 1981. In the now-familiar video footage and photographs of the attempted assassination on Reagan, he is seen (in light-grey suit, striped tie and spectacles) preceding the President and then standing beside him while shots are fired by John Hinckley Jr.

Ahearn stayed at the scene, cradling the head of wounded Press Secretary James Brady until medics arrived. He then proceeded to George Washington University Hospital, where he ushered the First Lady to the emergency room, then was the first aide to brief reporters (though before network cameras arrived; he can be glimpsed in the background of some later on-camera briefings).

In 2001, Ahearn was interviewed on CNN's Larry King Live, and later appeared in a History Channel documentary, concerning the Reagan assassination attempt.

In 2015, Ahearn was one of those publicly objecting to the release of assassin John Hinckley Jr. from custody. He told NBC, "I think it's important to remember what this man did. He shot the President of the United States. He condemned Jim Brady to a lifetime sentence in a wheelchair, a life of pain. I feel he's a threat to society if he should be released from treatment without supervision of any kind."

== Continued service for Reagan ==
In November 1981, President Reagan appointed Ahearn as chairman of the Federal Regional Council of New England. He served in this capacity, as well as regional representative of the Secretary of Labor, Raymond Donovan until August 1984. He then left the administration to join President Reagan's re-election campaign staff, picking sites and helping arrange (among other events) the October 1984 whistle-stop tour of Ohio, aboard the same train as used by Harry S Truman in 1948.

Following Reagan's re-election, Ahearn served as a deputy director of the 1985 Presidential Inaugural Committee. In February 1985, he resumed his post as Regional Representative of the Secretary of Labor in Region I. Ahearn eventually rejoined the Presidential Advance Office, in February 1986, and was appointed deputy director of Presidential Advance in February 1988. In this capacity, he coordinated Reagan's final campaign trips as president, on behalf of the Bush-Quayle 1988 campaign and the entire Republican ticket, and aided Reagan's communication efforts in general.

Ahearn was often an advocate of spontaneous appearances by Reagan with ordinary people; he personally scouted and arranged for a memorable January 1983 visit to a Dorchester, Mass. workingmen's bar (the Eire Pub) where the President hoisted a mug of beer with patrons. In 1988, Ahearn argued for a Reagan walkthrough at Moscow's crowded Arbat shopping area, during his visit to sign the INF Treaty with Soviet General Secretary Mikhail Gorbachev. This paralleled Gorbachev's unscheduled walk through Washington in 1987; Ahearn's arguments won the Reagans' approval, over Secret Service objections, and the Moscow tour was a success.

== HUD and Kemp ==
After aiding with the Transition of the two Republican Administrations, Ahearn accepted an offer from Jack Kemp, incoming Secretary of Housing and Urban Development, to serve as deputy assistant secretary. After President Bush's defeat in 1992, he continued with Kemp, serving as senior advisor to him at Empower America, a public policy organization founded by Kemp, Education Secretary William Bennett and former UN Ambassador Jeane Kirkpatrick.

When Kemp was chosen in 1996 as nominee for vice president by Robert J. Dole, Ahearn went to work for the Dole-Kemp Committee. In 2009, when Kemp died, Ahearn was in charge of arrangements for his memorial service at the National Cathedral in Washington, D.C.

== Later work ==
Ahearn was deputy campaign manager for the Steve Forbes for President Committee in 1999–2000. Forbes was defeated for the GOP nomination by George W. Bush. Following that effort, Ahearn was hired to help manage the campaign of Congressman Rick Lazio for the U.S. Senate, against First Lady Hillary Clinton. Lazio was defeated, in the most expensive Senate campaign in U.S. history.

In 2001 and 2002, Ahearn returned to California as campaign manager for Bill Simon in his quest to win the Republican nomination for governor. Simon was victorious in the March 2002 primary against former Los Angeles mayor Richard Riordan. Ahearn then left the campaign and returned to the East Coast; in the fall, Simon was defeated by Democratic incumbent Gray Davis.

Ahearn served as a campaign manager for the Party of Regions (Ukraine) in 2006 during the National Parliamentary Election in the Party of Regions' successful effort to take control of the Ukrainian Parliament.

In 2007 and early 2008, he served as deputy campaign manager for operations of Rudolph Giuliani’s presidential bid. His duties included training and supervision of advance staffers, and debate negotiations and execution.

Later in 2008, Ahearn returned to California to serve as deputy campaign manager for the Yes on 8 ballot initiative campaign, which scored a surprise triumph in November. "Rick is absolutely the best in the business. Having Rick on board is a real boon to Yes on 8," said Campaign Co-Manager Frank Schubert. "He's extremely well respected and has the ability to make good things happen."

At various times during the George W. Bush administration, Ahearn served as volunteer advance man and consultant for the President, Vice President Richard Cheney and others.

In the closing months of the 2012 election, Ahearn coordinated advance for the vice presidential campaign of Congressman Paul Ryan.

Ahearn was a senior adviser to the Donald Trump presidential campaign, making arrangements for the fall 2016 debates against Hillary Clinton, among other duties, and after the win was a senior consultant to the Trump-Pence Inaugural Committee.

== Supervising and assisting with presidential funerals ==
In 2004, Ahearn (together with James Hooley) was called upon by the Reagan family to oversee the arrangements for the first presidential funeral since Nixon's in 1994; the two had been developing plans for the event, which they dubbed Operation Serenade, for many years before. The Reagan state funeral that June was a massive undertaking with full military honors, memorial services and a procession through Washington D.C. The Californian's body lay in state at the U.S. Capitol (the first president to do so since 1973), then was flown to the Reagan Library in Simi Valley, California for interment.

Ahearn also served as an advance representative for Vice President Dick Cheney for the Grand Rapids, Michigan portion of Gerald R. Ford's state funeral. Ford's state funeral services and ceremonies from December 28, 2006, through January 4, 2007, were, by his choice, more modest, and centered near his desert home in Rancho Mirage, California, a funeral service at the National Cathedral in Washington, D.C. and interment near his presidential museum in Grand Rapids, Michigan.

Ahearn's management of the Reagan funeral in particular drew scorn from some liberal observers. A 2009 book by Will Bunch, Tear Down This Myth, suggested that the ceremonies were choreographed with a political agenda in mind. Bunch wrote in 2011 of pro-Reagan mythmaking that "No time was that more true than in the days that marked Reagan's death and funeral in June 2004. In fact, a team of Reagan's former White House advance team – the people in charge of spectacular backdrops for the Gipper's soundbites while he was president – spent years creating a media-friendly, pre-packaged memorial that would burnish the Reagan myth forever. It was led by former aides Jim Hooley and Rick Ahearn, who even gave their plan a catchy name: Operation Serenade." As Matthew Dallek noted in a review of Bunch's book, "Bunch shows a 'myth machine' has diligently worked to polish Reagan's historical reputation and cement his status as one of America's presidential giants. Bunch writes, for instance, that Reagan's defenders viewed his weeklong funeral celebration in June 2004 as, in the words of former White House aide Rick Ahearn, 'a legacy-building event.'"

Ahearn remained close to Nancy Reagan and her family, and was involved in planning the mostly private funeral before the First Lady's death in March 2016. "The passing of a first lady is not a state occasion per se," said Ahearn. "She was quite a private person, especially in her later years," Ahearn said.

== Personal life ==
In 1990, Ahearn married late Pamela Gardner, a senior protocol officer for presidents and the U.S. House of Representatives. They had met while working on the gubernatorial campaign of John Dalton of Virginia in 1977. The couple were married until her death in 2007. He said he experienced Nancy Reagan's compassion firsthand after his wife's death. "We shared a lot of tears," Ahearn said. "She was trying to encourage me, and telling me what it was like for her to lose her husband." He later began a relationship with Maria Mastorakos.

Ahearn died of complications of surgery on November 14, 2023, at the age of 74.
