= Mario Umana =

American judge and politician (1914–2005)

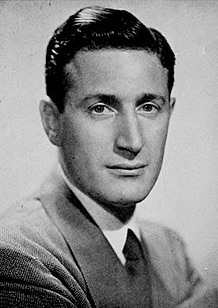
- Umana in 1967.

Member of the Massachusetts Senate for the 2nd Suffolk District
- In office 1953–1958
- Preceded by: Michael LoPresti Sr.
- Succeeded by: Michael LoPresti Sr.
- In office 1961–1973
- Preceded by: Michael LoPresti Sr.
- Succeeded by: Michael LoPresti Jr.

Personal details
- Born: May 5, 1914 Boston, Massachusetts, U.S.
- Died: April 27, 2005 (aged 90) Boston, Massachusetts, U.S.
- Party: Democratic
- Spouse: Anne T. Nigro
- Children: 2
- Education: Harvard University
- Occupation: Politician; Judge

Mario Umana (May 5, 1914 – April 27, 2005) was an American politician and judge.

== Career ==
A native of Boston and of Italian descent, Umana graduated from East Boston High School in 1932, the same year as Adio diBiccari. Umana then went to Harvard University and graduated from both their College in 1936 and Law School in 1941. He practiced law in Boston, and also joined the United States Army Air Forces during World War II.

Umana began his political career by serving in the Massachusetts House of Representatives as a Democrat from 1949 to 1952. He was then elected to the Massachusetts Senate for the 2nd Suffolk District from 1953 to 1958, and then from 1961 to 1973, which included tenures as the Majority Whip and Majority Leader. Umana as succeeded by Michael LoPresti Jr.

In 1964, Umana unsuccessfully ran in the 1964 Massachusetts gubernatorial election.

Umana returned to law in 1973 by becoming a judge for the Boston Municipal Court until retirement in 1991.

The Mario Umana Academy in East Boston was named in his honor.

Umana died from pneumonia at Massachusetts General Hospital in Boston in 2005.

== Personal life ==
Umana married Anne T. Nigro, with whom he resided in the Orient Heights area of East Boston. The couple had two daughters: Anne and Jeanne.
