= Joseph D. Ward =

American politician (1914-2003)

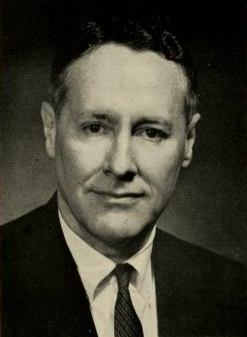

22nd Massachusetts Secretary of the Commonwealth
- In office January 20, 1959 – January 1961
- Governor: Foster Furcolo
- Preceded by: J. Henry Goguen
- Succeeded by: Kevin H. White

Member of the Massachusetts Senate 3rd Worcester District
- In office 1963–1973
- Preceded by: Elizabeth Stanton
- Succeeded by: Robert A. Hall

Member of the Massachusetts House of Representatives 13th Worcester District
- In office 1949–1956
- Succeeded by: Peter J. Levanti

Personal details
- Born: March 26, 1914 Fitchburg, Massachusetts
- Died: May 10, 2003 (aged 89) Ocean Ridge, Florida
- Party: Democratic Party
- Education: College of the Holy Cross; Boston University
- Profession: Lawyer

Joseph D. Ward (March 26, 1914 – May 10, 2003) was an American politician who served as Massachusetts Secretary of the Commonwealth from January 1959 to January 1961.

Ward was elected to the Massachusetts House of Representatives in 1948, representing the 13th Worcester District. He was a candidate for Massachusetts Attorney General in 1956, but lost to Edward J. McCormack Jr. in the Democratic primary. Ward was appointed Secretary of the Commonwealth following the death of Edward J. Cronin. In 1960, Ward ran for Governor of Massachusetts. He defeated Endicott Peabody, Francis E. Kelly, Robert F. Murphy, John Francis Kennedy, Gabriel Piemonte, and Alfred Magaletta in the primary, but lost to John A. Volpe in the general election. He was elected to the Massachusetts Senate in 1962 and remained there until his retirement from politics in 1972.

Ward also spent 12 years as a professor of political law at Boston University.

== See also ==
- Massachusetts legislature: 1949–1950, 1951–1952, 1953–1954, 1955–1956

Political offices
Preceded by J. Henry Goguen	22nd Massachusetts Secretary of the Commonwealth; January 20, 1959 – January 1961	Succeeded by Kevin H. White
Party political offices
Preceded by Foster Furcolo	Massachusetts Democratic Party gubernatorial candidate 1960 (lost)	Succeeded by Endicott Peabody
