= Michael LoPresti Jr. =

American politician

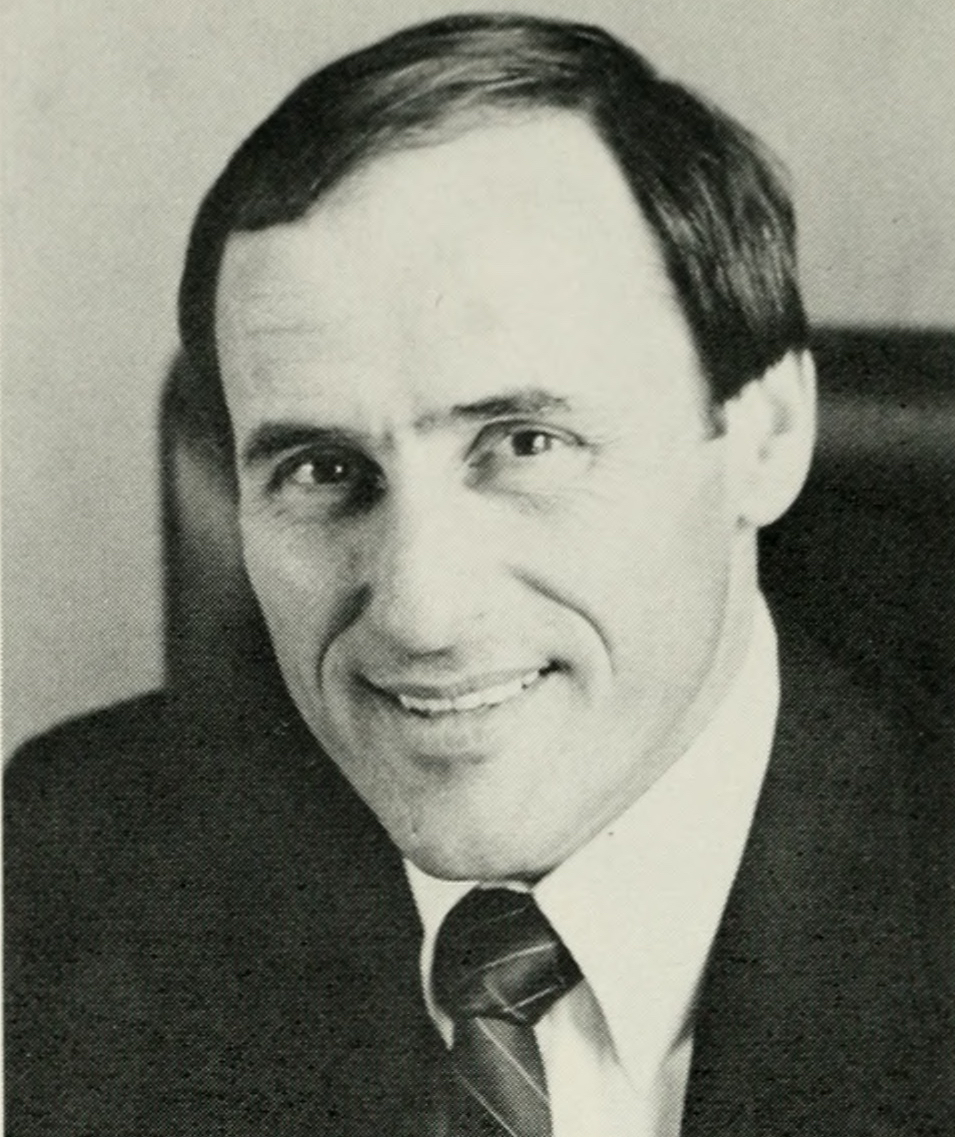
Michael LoPresti Jr.

Michael LoPresti Jr. was an American politician who served as a member of the Massachusetts Senate from 1973 to 1993.

LoPresti was born on April 30, 1947, in Boston. His father, Michael LoPresti Sr., was a member of the Massachusetts Senate from 1947 to 1953 and again from 1958 to 1961. LoPresti earned a bachelor's degree from Harvard College and a law degree from the Boston University School of Law.

LoPresti began his political career in 1973 by running in the special election caused by the resignation of Second Suffolk District senator Mario Umana. The then 26-year-old law student upset two state representatives with the support of members of Umana's and Kevin White's organizations as well as Alfred Vellucci and Frederick C. Langone. Following redistricting, LoPresti represented the Suffolk and Middlesex District from 1975 to 1993. During his tenure in the Senate, Lopresti served as chairman of the legislature's Judiciary Committee.

LoPresti Park at 33 Sumner Street in East Boston was established in 1978 in his honor.

LoPresti died on December 16, 2004, at his home in East Boston.

Government offices
Preceded by District created	Member of the Massachusetts Senate for the Suffolk and Middlesex District; 1975–1993	Succeeded by Robert Travaglini
Preceded by Mario Umana	Member of the Massachusetts Senate for the Second Suffolk District; 1973–1975	Succeeded by Bill Owens
