= Augustus Gardner Means =

American politician

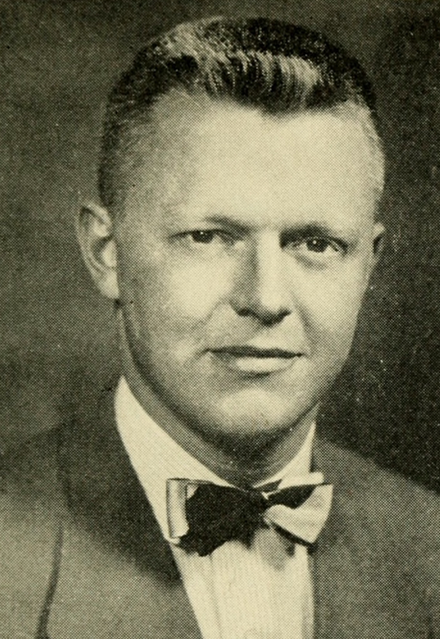
- Means c. 1953

Member of the Massachusetts Governor's Council from the 5th District
- In office 1955–1961
- Preceded by: Arthur A. Thomson
- Succeeded by: John J. Buckley

Member of the Massachusetts House of Representatives from the 2nd Essex District
- In office 1951–1955
- Preceded by: Colin J. Cameron
- Succeeded by: Barclay H. Warburton III

Personal details
- Born: June 8, 1925 Beverly, Massachusetts, U.S.
- Died: April 18, 1994 (aged 68) Sanibel, Florida, U.S.
- Party: Republican
- Spouse(s): Mary Callan (1946–1959; divorce); Jean Draper (1961–1994; his death)
- Education: University of Massachusetts; Cornell University

Augustus Gardner Means (June 8, 1925 – April 18, 1994) was an American businessman and politician who was a member of the Massachusetts House of Representatives and the Massachusetts Governor's Council. He was also the Republican nominee for Massachusetts State Treasurer in 1954 and Lieutenant Governor of Massachusetts in 1960.

== Early life ==
Means was born on June 8, 1925, in Beverly, Massachusetts, to W. Gordon and Constance (Gardner) Means. He was the great-grandson of Henry Cabot Lodge and the grandson of Augustus Peabody Gardner. Means attended the Groton School and in 1944 he graduated from the Culver Military Academy.

After graduating, Means enlisted in the United States Army. He served with the 80th Infantry Division in France during World War II. He was shot in the chest outside of Bastogne when a platoon he was leading was pinned down by a concealed German machine gun. A deck of playing cards partially deflected the bullet and Means was able to crawl behind the gun and jump the soldiers manning it - killing three of them. His citations included the Distinguished Service Cross and Purple Heart.

After his discharge in January 1946, Means worked as a veterinary assistant in Wakefield, Massachusetts. He attended the University of Massachusetts Amherst and graduated from Cornell University, where he studied veterinary medicine and agriculture.

== Personal life ==
In July 1946 he married Mary Callan. The couple first met at a dance in Boston when he was 13 and she was 11. The couple moved to Turf Meadow Farm in Essex, Massachusetts, which had been purchased by Means' father years before. Together had five children - three daughters and two sons. The couple later divorced and in May 1961 he married Jean Draper Ham, granddaughter of George A. Draper. They had two sons and one daughter.

== Political career ==
In 1950, Means was elected to the Essex Board of Selectmen. He did some of his campaigning while collecting garbage for the town (Means used the garbage as pig feed). Later that year he was elected to the Massachusetts House of Representatives. In 1954 he was the Republican nominee for state treasurer. He lost to Democrat John Francis Kennedy 54% to 45%. In October 1955, Means was appointed to the Massachusetts Governor's Council to fill the vacancy caused by Arthur A. Thomson's appointment to the Haverhill District Court. Means was elected in his own right in 1956 and reelected in 1958. In 1960, he was the Republican nominee for Lieutenant Governor. He lost to Democrat Edward F. McLaughlin, Jr. 54% to 45%.

== Business career ==
Means owned a large livestock farm that had a sizable amount of cattle, sheep, chickens, turkeys, bison, and hogs. He was also involved in a number of other businesses; he was president of the Essex Lumber Co., president and treasurer of Means Chevrolet-Oldsmobile in Ipswich, Massachusetts, managing director of a hotel in Aruba, and owner of a shopping center in Manchester-by-the-Sea, Massachusetts. He also served as president of the Essex County Agricultural Society, which runs the Topsfield Fair.

== Later life and death ==
In his later years Means donated much of his 650-acre farm to the Essex County Greenbelt. Means died on April 18, 1994, in Sanibel, Florida.

== See also ==
- 1951–1952 Massachusetts legislature
- 1953–1954 Massachusetts legislature

Party political offices
Preceded by Roy C. Papalia	Republican nominee for Treasurer and Receiver-General of Massachusetts; 1954	Succeeded by Robert H. Beaudreau
Preceded by Elmer C. Nelson	Republican nominee for Lieutenant Governor of Massachusetts; 1960	Succeeded by Francis W. Perry
