= John B. Kennedy (politician) =

American city manager and politician

Saugus, Massachusetts Town Manager
- In office 1958–1960
- Preceded by: Daniel E. McLean
- Succeeded by: John O. Stinson

Medford, Massachusetts City Manager
- In office 1957–1958
- Preceded by: James Shurtleff
- Succeeded by: Edward J. Conroy

Norwood, Massachusetts Town Manager
- In office 1951–1957

Personal details
- Born: 1900 or 1901
- Died: January 26, 1983 (aged 82) Laconia, New Hampshire
- Party: Democratic
- Education: Wentworth Institute; Franklin Union Technical Institute
- Occupation: City Administrator; Politician

John Boyle Kennedy (died January 26, 1983, in Laconia, New Hampshire) was an American city manager and politician. He was City Manager of Medford, Massachusetts, and Town Manager of Norwood, Massachusetts, and Saugus, Massachusetts. He was a candidate for Treasurer and Receiver-General of Massachusetts in 1960.

== Early life and career ==
Kennedy graduated from Winthrop High School in 1918 and went on to earn degrees from Wentworth Institute and Franklin Union Technical Institute. He also completed course in municipal government at Boston University.

Kennedy's career in municipal management began in Winthrop, Massachusetts, where he served as water commissioner and business manager. In 1949, he and seven other water superintendents agreed to form the Massachusetts Water Works Association, a corporation that would gather and disseminate information to insure an adequate supply of drinking water. Kennedy served as the corporation's first Secretary.

== Norwood Town Manager ==
After ten years as water commissioner, Kennedy left Winthrop to become Town Manager of Norwood, Massachusetts. In 1954, after a series of assaults on women in town, which included the murder of 15-year-old Geraldine Annese, Kennedy declared a state of emergency.

== Medford City Manager ==
From 1957 to 1958, Kennedy served as City Manager of Medford, Massachusetts. In January 1958, two members of the Medford City Council requested that Kennedy resign. City Councilor and Kennedy's predecessor as City Manager James Shurtleff told Kennedy that six of the seven members of the City Council would vote in favor of removing him if he chose not to resign. On January 29, he announced that he would not resign. On March 30, 1958, the City Council voted to suspend Kennedy, despite the fact that the crowd of over 400 was mostly pro-Kennedy. On April 8, the city council voted for to 4 to 3 to fire Kennedy, who the council accused of 19 charges, including being appointed unethically by the previous council, failing to "provide executive leadership", failing to "show reasonable understanding of municipal finance", and establishing an "unsound" tax rate.

== Saugus Town Manager ==
In May 1958, Kennedy was named Town Manager of Saugus, Massachusetts. He succeeded Daniel E. McLean, who resigned to become Chairman of the Massachusetts Republican State Committee.

In 1960, Kennedy ran for Treasurer and Receiver-General of Massachusetts. He finished third in the Democratic primary behind John T. Driscoll and Patrick F. McDonough.

On September 11, 1960, the Saugus Board of Selectmen requested Kennedy's resignation. Kennedy did not resign and at the next meeting, the Selectmen voted 4 to 1 to fire Kennedy. Kennedy's dismissal came one month after three new Selectmen were elected in a special recall election (all of whom voted to remove Kennedy). One of the reasons for firing Kennedy, according to Selectman Frederick Wagner, was the manager's decision to put curbing on the sidewalk in front of his Taylor Street home instead of on a sidewalk where children more frequently walked.

== Later life and death ==
Kennedy later worked for Whitman & Howard, an engineering firm located in Boston, until his retirement at the age of 70. He died on January 26, 1983, at the St. Francis Home for the Aged in Laconia, New Hampshire. He was 82 years old.
