= Francis X. Ahearn =

American politician (1917–2006)

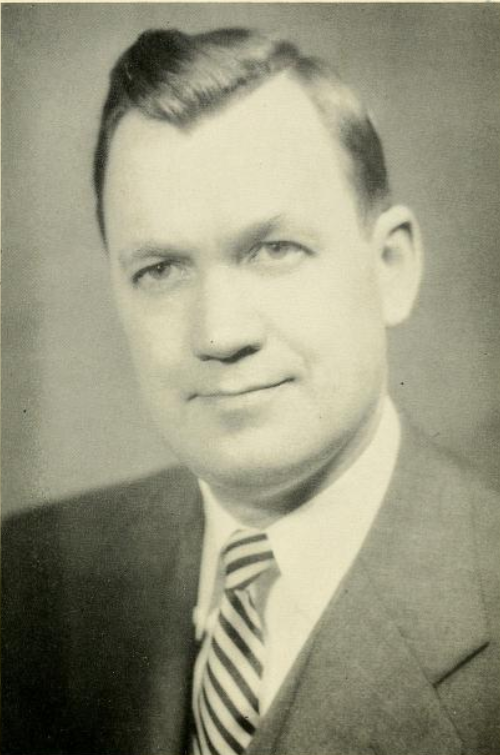

President of the Boston City Council
- In office 1953–1954
- Preceded by: Gabriel F. Piemonte
- Succeeded by: Joseph C. White

Member of the Boston City Council
- In office 1952–1958

Personal details
- Born: Francis Xavier Ahearn; February 26, 1917 Brighton, Massachusetts, U.S.
- Died: December 12, 2006 (aged 89) Massachusetts, U.S.
- Party: Democratic
- Spouse: Doris E. Johnson
- Children: 2 (including Rick Ahearn)
- Education: Boston College (AB, JD)
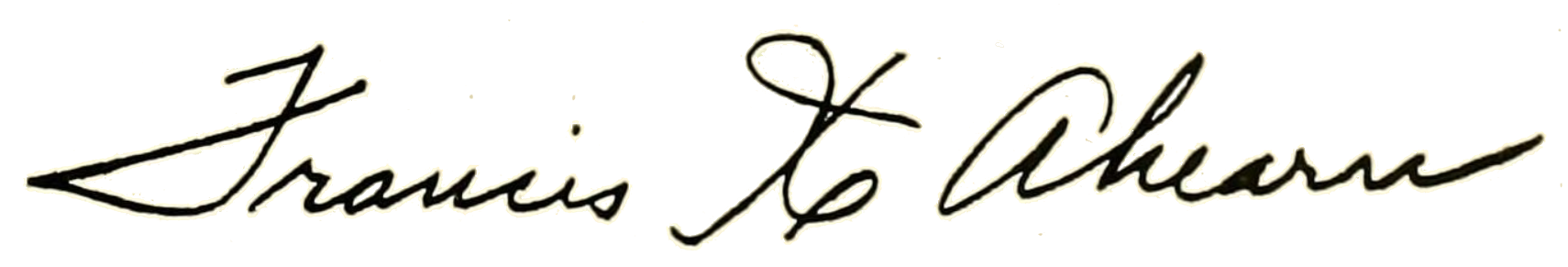
- Signature

Military service
- Branch/service: United States Navy
- Years of service: 1944–1958
- Rank: Lieutenant (junior grade)
- Unit: Naval Station Pearl Harbor

Francis Xavier Ahearn (February 26, 1917 – December 12, 2006) was an American politician who served on the Boston City Council from 1952 to 1958. He was the council president in 1953.

== Early life ==
Ahearn was born on February 26, 1917, in Brighton. He graduated from Boston College in 1940 with a degree in economics and went on to attend Boston College Law School. In 1940 he married Doris E. Johnson, whom he first met when they attended junior high school. The couple had two sons, one of whom, Rick Ahearn, also became involved in politics. During World War II, Ahearn served in the United States Navy as a legal officer at the Naval Air Station at Pearl Harbor. After the war, Ahearn worked as an adjunct professor at Boston College Law School and Calvin Coolidge Law School/New England School of Law.

== Political career ==
During the late 1940s, Ahearn served as the chairman of the Plan E for Boston Committee, a group that wanted the city to adopt a council/manager form of government.

In 1951, Ahearn was elected to the Boston City Council. The following year he was elected council president. As council president, Ahearn served as acting mayor on several occasions when Mayor John Hynes was unavailable, including when President Dwight D. Eisenhower visited Boston.

On March 8, 1957, Ahearn was appointed First Deputy Secretary of the Commonwealth. He completed his term as councilor, but did not run for reelection. In 1960, Ahearn was a candidate for Secretary of the Commonwealth. He lost in the Democratic primary to attorney Kevin White. He received 37% of the vote compared to White's 39%, with Margaret McGovern, Boston's assistant corporation counsel, receiving the remaining 24%.

In 1962, Ahearn unsuccessfully ran for a seat in the Massachusetts House of Representatives.

== Later life and death ==
After leaving the Secretary's office, Ahearn served as chief legal counsel to the State Appellate Tax Board. He resided and practiced law in both Brighton and Cotuit, Massachusetts. He died on December 12, 2006, at a rehabilitation facility in Bourne, Massachusetts. He was survived by his wife Doris and their two children.

Preceded by Gabriel F. Piemonte	President of the Boston City Council; 1953	Succeeded by Joseph C. White
