= Margaret McGovern =

American politician

Margaret F. McGovern (1924-2009) was an American attorney and political candidate who was one of the first female candidates to seek statewide office in Massachusetts.

== Early life ==
McGovern was born in Boston in 1924. Her parents, Joseph and Adele McGovern, both graduated from Boston University School of Law. McGovern graduated from Notre Dame Academy in Roxbury in 1942. She attended Emmanuel College for two years before entering an accelerated program at Boston University School of Law.

== Legal career ==
McGovern graduated from law school in 1946 and was the only woman in her graduating class. She then joined the family firm. In 1947, she was admitted to practice law before the United States Supreme Court. In 1956, Mayor John Hynes appointed McGovern to the position of assistant corporation counsel for the city of Boston. She left the city law department following Hynes' departure in 1960. McGovern practiced law for over 60 years, working mainly in family law.

== Political campaigns ==
On May 26, 1960, McGovern announced her candidacy for Secretary of the Commonwealth of Massachusetts. In the Democratic primary she received 24% of the vote to Kevin White's 39% and Francis X. Ahearn 37%.

In 1962, she was a candidate for Massachusetts Attorney General. She finished third in the Democratic primary behind Francis E. Kelly and James R. Lawton.

== Personal life and death ==
McGovern was married twice. Both ended in divorce. She had two daughters with her first husband.

McGovern died on February 21, 2009, at her daughter's home in Mill Valley, California.
