= John T. Driscoll =

American politician (1925–2019)

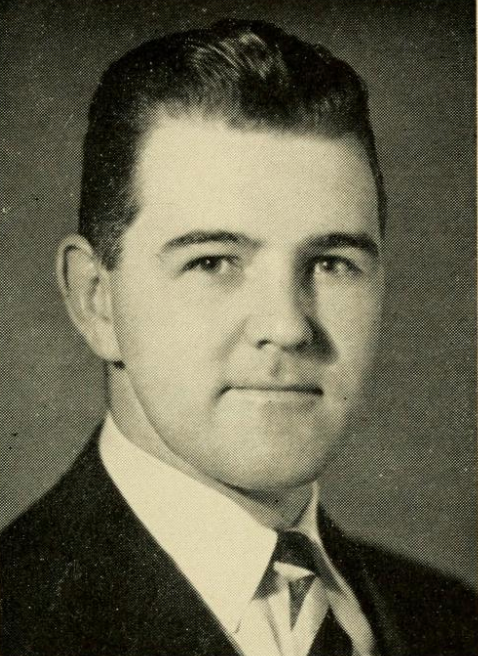
- Driscoll in 1955

52nd Treasurer and Receiver-General of Massachusetts
- In office 1961–1964
- Governor: John Volpe
- Preceded by: John Francis Kennedy
- Succeeded by: Robert Q. Crane

Chairman of the Massachusetts Turnpike Authority
- In office 1964–1987
- Preceded by: William F. Callahan
- Succeeded by: Allan R. McKinnon

Member of the Massachusetts House of Representatives from the 16th Suffolk district
- In office 1955-1960

Personal details
- Born: October 26, 1925 Medford, Massachusetts, U.S.
- Died: March 11, 2019 (aged 93) Milton, Massachusetts, U.S.
- Party: Democratic Party
- Education: Boston College
- Profession: Real estate and insurance broker

John Thomas Driscoll (October 26, 1925 - March 11, 2019) was a former American politician who served as a member of the Massachusetts House of Representatives from 1955 to 1960, Treasurer and Receiver-General of Massachusetts from 1961 to 1964, chairman of the Massachusetts Turnpike Authority from 1964 to 1987, and Vice President for Administration at Boston College from 1987 to 1997.

During his tenure as treasurer, he defeated three different candidates named John Kennedy. He defeated John B. Kennedy and John M. Kennedy in the 1960 Democratic primary and John Francis Kennedy and John M. Kennedy in the 1962 primary.

== See also ==
- 1955–1956 Massachusetts legislature

Party political offices
Preceded by John Francis Kennedy	Democratic nominee for Treasurer and Receiver-General of Massachusetts; 1960, 1962	Succeeded by Robert Q. Crane
Political offices
Preceded by John Francis Kennedy	Treasurer and Receiver-General of Massachusetts; 1961–1964	Succeeded by Robert Q. Crane
