= Edward F. McLaughlin Jr. =

American politician (1920-2005)

Edward Francis McLaughlin Jr.
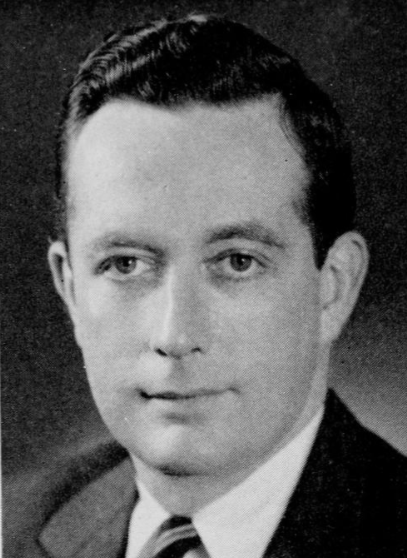

60th Lieutenant Governor of Massachusetts
- In office January 5, 1961 – January 3, 1963
- Governor: John A. Volpe
- Preceded by: Robert F. Murphy
- Succeeded by: Francis X. Bellotti

Member of the City Council of Boston
- In office 1953–1960

President of the City Council of Boston
- In office 1959–1960
- Preceded by: Patrick F. McDonough
- Succeeded by: Patrick F. McDonough

Personal details
- Born: August 18, 1920 Boston, Massachusetts
- Died: January 21, 2005 (aged 84) Centerville, Massachusetts
- Party: Democratic
- Spouse: Elizabeth Drake
- Relations: Edward F. McLaughlin (father)
- Children: Paul R. McLaughlin, Richard J. McLaughlin, Elizabeth Ann McLaughlin, Patricia Anne McLaughlin, Edward F. McLaughlin III, Robert D. McLaughlin.
- Education: Boston Latin School, Dartmouth College, A.B. Tuck School of Business, Northeastern University School of Law, L.L.B.
- Profession: Attorney

Military service
- Branch/service: United States Navy
- Rank: Lieutenant
- Unit: PT Squadron 10,
- Commands: Pacific Theater of Operations, South West Pacific theater
- Battles/wars: World War II

Edward Francis McLaughlin Jr. (August 18, 1920 – January 21, 2005) was an American attorney and politician who served as an assistant United States Attorney, Boston city councilor, president of the Boston City Council, and the 60th lieutenant governor of Massachusetts from 1961 to 1963.

As a member of the U.S. Attorney's office, McLaughlin was one of the prosecutors in the Brinks robbery case. He later served as a deputy general manager and chief legal counsel for the Massachusetts Bay Transportation Authority.

== Bibliography ==
- Commonwealth of Massachusetts, 1961-1962 Public officers of the Commonwealth of Massachusetts, p. 23, (1961).
- Long, Tom.: EDWARD F. MCLAUGHLIN JR., 84, FORMER LIEUTENANT GOVERNOR, The Boston Globe (January 22, 2005).
- The Boston Globe, McLAUGHLIN, The Honorable Edward F. Jr. (January 24, 2005)
- The Boston Herald, Obituary; Edward McLaughlin funeral rites today, pg. 32 (January 25, 2005).
- Massachusetts Board of Bar Overseers McLaughlin's Bar Record (accessed January 21, 2009)
- McLaughlin, Peter.: My Grandfather: Edward F. McLaughlin Jr. The Life of a Lieutenant Overseas (accessed January 21, 2009).

Party political offices
Preceded by Robert F. Murphy	Democratic nominee for Lieutenant Governor of Massachusetts; 1960	Succeeded by Francis Bellotti
Political offices
Preceded by Robert F. Murphy	Lieutenant Governor of Massachusetts; 1961–1963	Succeeded by Francis X. Bellotti
