= John Francis Kennedy (politician) =

American politician

Treasurer and Receiver-General of Massachusetts
- In office 1955–1961
- Governor: Christian A. Herter; Paul A. Dever
- Preceded by: Foster Furcolo
- Succeeded by: John T. Driscoll

Personal details
- Born: August 1, 1905 Boston, Massachusetts, U.S.
- Died: May 13, 1994 (aged 88) South Boston, Massachusetts, U.S.
- Party: Democratic
- Spouse: Dorothy Williams

John Francis Kennedy (August 1, 1905 – May 13, 1994) was the Treasurer of Massachusetts from 1955 to 1961.

Kennedy worked as a supervisor in the miscellaneous small parts stockroom for Gillette in Canton, Massachusetts, before seeking public office. Kennedy first sought the office of Treasurer in 1952, losing the Democratic primary to Foster Furcolo. Kennedy sought the office again in 1954, defeating the party endorsed candidate (Clement A. Riley) and a third candidate (William F. Carr) in the Primary. Kennedy then defeated Republican Augustus Gardner Means to win the office.

Kennedy's electoral success is widely seen to be a result of him having the same name as then-Massachusetts Senator John F. Kennedy. Kennedy's campaigns consisted of him spending $200 total ($100 for the primary, $100 for the general election) and bypassing a party convention to directly compete in the primary. After serving three terms as Treasurer, Kennedy sought the office of Governor of Massachusetts in 1960. Kennedy finished in 5th place (of 7 candidates) with 8.85%.

The 1960 Massachusetts primary included six John Kennedys seeking various office. John Kennedy of Canton (The State Treasurer) sought the office of governor. John B. Kennedy of Saugus and John M. Kennedy of Boston both sought the office of state treasurer. John Kennedy of Braintree sought the office of Norfolk county commissioner. Two John Kennedys (from Everett and Plymouth) both sought seats in the Massachusetts State House. In the State Treasurer's race, Kennedy of Saugus finished third and Kennedy of Boston finished 5th in a six-man field.

Party political offices
Preceded by Foster Furcolo	Democratic nominee for Treasurer and Receiver-General of Massachusetts; 1954, 1956, 1958	Succeeded by John T. Driscoll
Political offices
Preceded by Foster Furcolo	Treasurer and Receiver-General of Massachusetts; 1955 – 1961	Succeeded by John T. Driscoll
