= John A. Volpe =

American politician and diplomat (1908–1994)

John Volpe OMRI
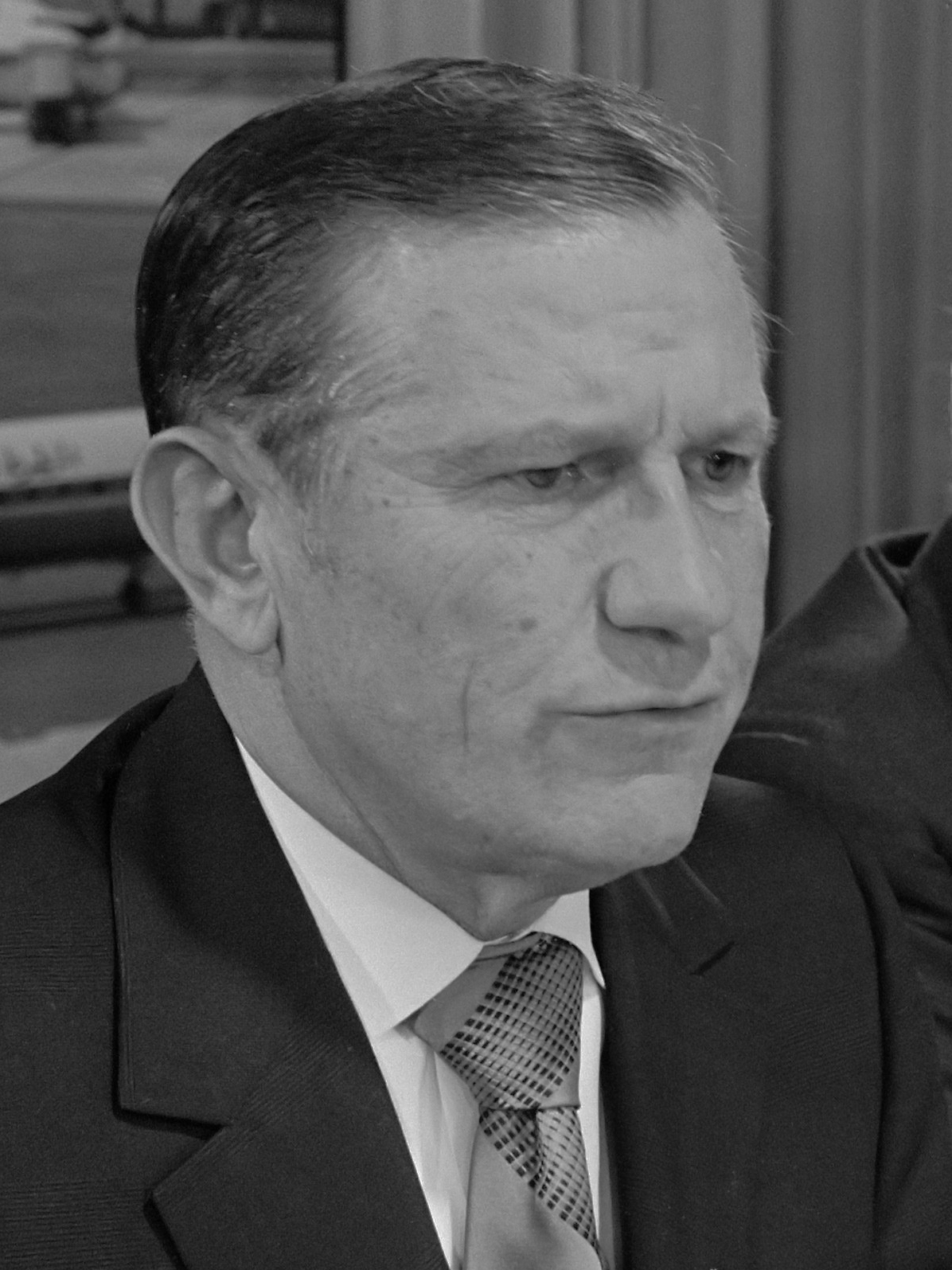
- Volpe in 1970

23rd United States Ambassador to Italy
- In office March 6, 1973 – January 24, 1977
- President: Richard Nixon; Gerald Ford; Jimmy Carter
- Preceded by: Graham Martin
- Succeeded by: Richard N. Gardner

2nd United States Secretary of Transportation
- In office January 22, 1969 – February 2, 1973
- President: Richard Nixon
- Preceded by: Alan S. Boyd
- Succeeded by: Claude Brinegar

Chair of the National Governors Association
- In office October 16, 1967 – July 21, 1968
- Preceded by: William L. Guy
- Succeeded by: Buford Ellington

61st and 63rd Governor of Massachusetts
- In office January 7, 1965 – January 22, 1969
- Lieutenant: Elliot Richardson; Francis Sargent
- Preceded by: Endicott Peabody
- Succeeded by: Francis Sargent
- In office January 5, 1961 – January 3, 1963
- Lieutenant: Edward F. McLaughlin Jr.
- Preceded by: Foster Furcolo
- Succeeded by: Endicott Peabody

Administrator of the Federal Highway Administration Acting
- In office October 22, 1956 – February 5, 1957
- President: Dwight D. Eisenhower
- Preceded by: Charles Dwight Curtiss
- Succeeded by: Bertram D. Tallamy

Massachusetts Commissioner of Public Works
- In office February 1953 – October 22, 1956
- Governor: Christian Herter
- Preceded by: William F. Callahan
- Succeeded by: Carl A. Sheridan

Personal details
- Born: John Anthony Volpe; December 8, 1908 Wakefield, Massachusetts, U.S.
- Died: November 11, 1994 (aged 85) Nahant, Massachusetts, U.S.
- Party: Republican
- Spouse: Giovannina Benedetto (m. 1934)
- Children: 2
- Education: Wentworth Institute of Technology (BS)

Military service
- Allegiance: United States
- Branch/service: United States Navy
- Years of service: 1942–1946
- Rank: Lieutenant Commander
- Unit: Seabees
- Battles/wars: World War II

John Anthony Volpe (/ˈvoʊlpi/ VOHL-pee; December 8, 1908 – November 11, 1994) was an American businessman, diplomat, and politician from Massachusetts. A son of Italian immigrants, he founded and owned a large construction firm. Politically, he was a Republican in increasingly Democratic Massachusetts, serving as its 61st and 63rd governor from 1961 to 1963 and 1965 to 1969, as the United States secretary of transportation from 1969 to 1973, and as the United States ambassador to Italy from 1973 to 1977. As Secretary of Transportation, Volpe was an important figure in the development of the Interstate Highway System at the federal level.

== Early life and education ==
Volpe was born on December 8, 1908, in Wakefield, Massachusetts. He was the son of Italian immigrants Vito and Filomena (née Benedetto) Volpe, who had come from Pescosansonesco, Abruzzo, to Boston's North End on the SS Canopic in 1905; his father was in the construction business.

Volpe attended the Wentworth Institute (later known as the Wentworth Institute of Technology) in Boston where he majored in architectural construction and entered the construction business, building his own firm in 1930. By the outbreak of World War II, it was one of the United States' leading construction companies.

== Personal life ==
In 1934, Volpe married Giovannina Benedetto, with whom he had two children, John Anthony, Jr. and Loretta Jean Volpe Rotondi. During World War II, he volunteered to serve stateside as a United States Navy Seabees training officer, enlisting with the rank of lieutenant commander. He was a Knight of Malta and a member of the Knights of Columbus.

== Early political career ==
Volpe's first political post was in 1951, when he served as the deputy chair of the Massachusetts Republican Party. In 1953, Governor Christian Herter appointed him the Massachusetts Commissioner of Public Works, and in 1956 he was appointed by President Dwight D. Eisenhower as the first administrator of the Federal Highway Administration. In this position he oversaw the early phases of the development of the Interstate Highway System.

== Governor of Massachusetts ==
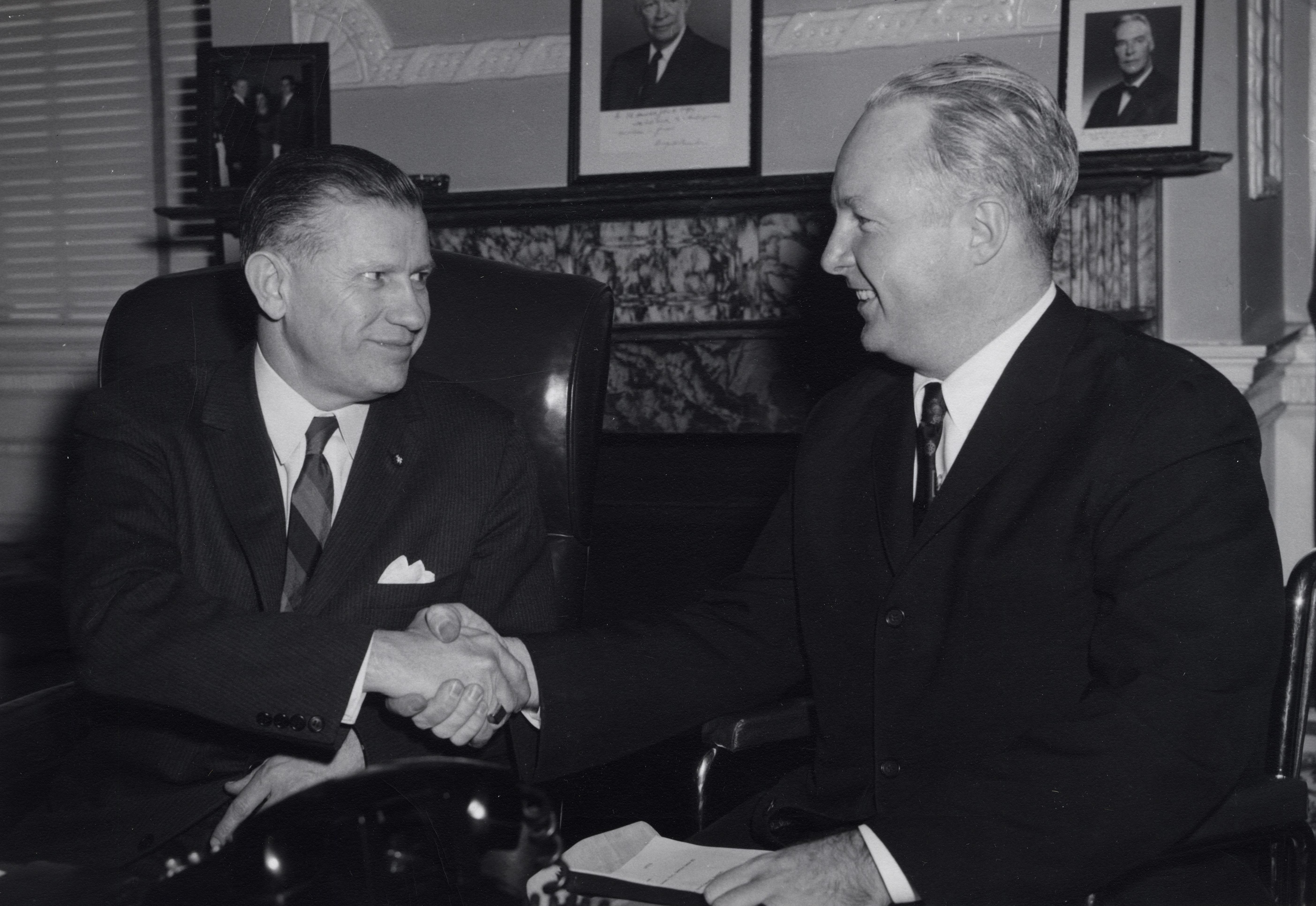
Volpe with Boston Mayor John F. Collins (1960–1968).

In 1960, Volpe was elected Governor of Massachusetts, defeating Massachusetts Secretary of the Commonwealth Joseph D. Ward. He served as governor from 1961 to 1963. In 1962, Volpe was narrowly defeated for reelection, losing to former Governor's Councillor and JFK friend Endicott Peabody. In 1964, Volpe ran again for governor and was able to capitalize on disarray within the Massachusetts Democratic Party when Lieutenant Governor Francis X. Bellotti defeated Peabody for the Democratic nomination for governor. Despite the Democratic landslide nationwide that year, Volpe defeated Bellotti in a close race. In 1966, Volpe was elected to the first four-year term in Massachusetts history, defeating former Massachusetts Attorney General Edward J. McCormack, Jr.

During his administrations, Volpe signed legislation to ban racial imbalances in education, reorganize the state's Board of Education, liberalize birth control laws, and increase public housing for low-income families. Governor Volpe also raised revenues, engaging in a long and ultimately successful fight to institute a three percent state sales tax. He served as president of the National Governors Association from 1967 to 1968. In 1962, Volpe signed into law the bill passed by 162nd Massachusetts General Court that established the University of Massachusetts Medical School. On April 22, 1965, Volpe received a visit from Rev. Martin Luther King Jr. at the Massachusetts State House, after which King delivered an address to a joint session of the 164th Massachusetts General Court.

On April 1, 1965, a special committee appointed by Massachusetts Education Commissioner Owen Kiernan released its final report finding that more than half of black students enrolled in Boston Public Schools (BPS) attended institutions with enrollments that were at least 80 percent black and that housing segregation in the city had caused the racial imbalance. From its creation under the National Housing Act of 1934 signed into law by President Franklin D. Roosevelt, the Federal Housing Administration used its official mortgage insurance underwriting policy explicitly to prevent school desegregation, while the Boston Housing Authority actively segregated the city's public housing developments since at least 1941 and continued to do so despite the passage of legislation by the 156th Massachusetts General Court prohibiting racial discrimination or segregation in housing in 1950 and the issuance of Executive Order 11063 by President John F. Kennedy in 1962 that required all federal agencies to prevent racial discrimination in federally-funded subsidized housing in the United States.

In response to the report, on April 20, 1965, the Boston NAACP filed a lawsuit in federal district court against the city seeking the desegregation of the city's public schools. Volpe filed a request for legislation from the state legislature that defined schools with nonwhite enrollments greater than 50 percent to be imbalanced and granted the State Board of Education the power to withhold state funds from any school district in the state that was found to have racial imbalance, which Volpe would sign into law the following August. Also in August 1965, along with Boston Mayor John F. Collins (1960–1968) and BPS Superintendent William H. Ohrenberger, Volpe opposed and warned the Boston School Committee that a vote that they held that month to abandon a proposal to bus several hundred black students from Roxbury and North Dorchester from three overcrowded schools to nearby schools in Dorchester and Brighton, and purchase an abandoned Hebrew school in Dorchester to relieve the overcrowding instead, could now be held by a court to be deliberate acts of segregation. Pursuant to the Racial Imbalance Act, the state conducted a racial census and found 55 imbalanced schools in the state with 46 in Boston, and in October 1965, the State Board required the School Committee to submit a desegregation plan, which the School Committee did the following December.

In April 1966, the State Board found the plan inadequate and voted to rescind state aid to the district, and in response, the School Committee filed a lawsuit against the State Board challenging both the decision and the constitutionality of the Racial Imbalance Act the following August. In January 1967, the Massachusetts Superior Court overturned a Suffolk Superior Court ruling that the State Board had improperly withdrawn the funds and ordered the School Committee to submit an acceptable plan to the State Board within 90 days or else permanently lose funding, which the School Committee did shortly thereafter and the State Board accepted. In June 1967, the Massachusetts Supreme Judicial Court upheld the constitutionality of the Racial Imbalance Act and the U.S. Supreme Court under Chief Justice Earl Warren (1953–1969) declined to hear the School Committee's appeal in January 1968.

Supportive of civil rights for African-Americans, Volpe saw the discrimination of African-Americans as similar to his own experience with discrimination due to his Italian ancestry.

In 1968, Volpe stood unsuccessfully as a "favorite son" candidate in the Massachusetts Republican presidential primary. Though he was the only person on the ballot, he was defeated by a spontaneous write-in campaign for New York Governor Nelson A. Rockefeller. Volpe endorsed Richard M. Nixon. Volpe was one of the finalists in Nixon's decision concerning a running mate; he was considered acceptable to most wings of the party, but Nixon ultimately selected Spiro Agnew instead.

== Secretary of Transportation ==
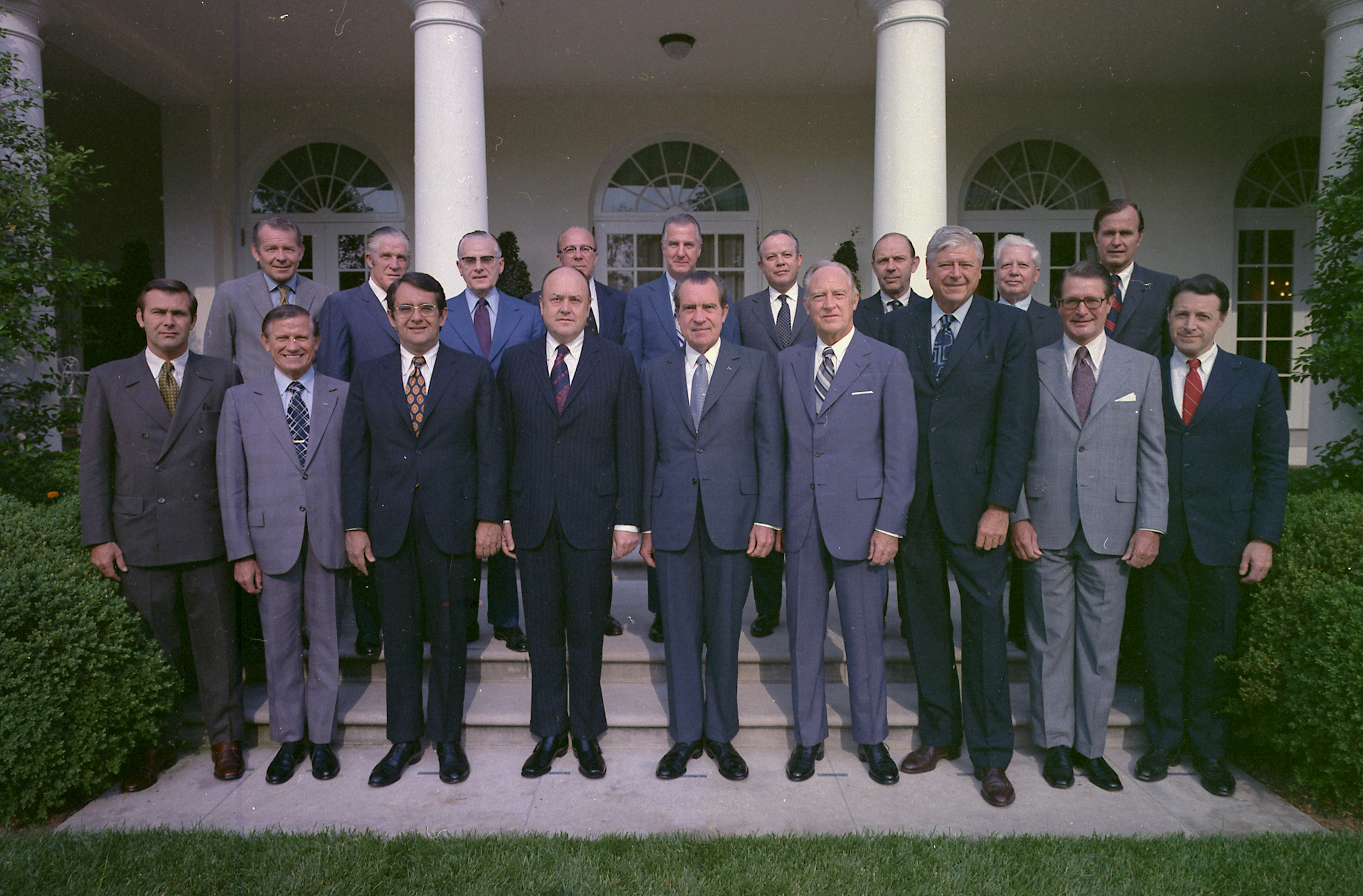
Volpe in a group photo of Nixon's cabinet on June 16, 1972, second from the left on the bottom row.

Following the election, President Nixon rewarded Volpe for his support by appointing him Secretary of Transportation. He resigned as governor to assume the cabinet post, and served in that position from 1969 to 1973.

During his tenure, Volpe abandoned previous positions supportive of unfettered highway construction, instead pushing for a more balanced approach to the nation's transportation infrastructure. He was notably instrumental in effectively ending attempts to revive Boston's failed Inner Belt project, which he had promoted as highway administrator. Likewise, Volpe's 1969 decision to kill the proposed Riverfront Expressway saved New Orleans's historic French Quarter and marked a substantial victory for preservationists, who were able to convince Volpe that an expressway that cut the Quarter off from the riverfront would have been disastrous. Amtrak was established during his time in office. An avid cyclist who biked to work on a folding bike, he used his position - and the energy crisis - to encourage more Americans to bike.

Volpe was the second to serve in this role following the position becoming a Cabinet-level appointment. He received the Award of Excellence in 1970 from Engineering News-Record for his service as Secretary of Transportation.

== Ambassador to Italy ==
Volpe had a long and abiding interest in the homeland of his parents, and visited it many times. In 1969, he was awarded the Knight Grand Cross of the Order of Merit of the Italian Republic.

In 1973, Volpe was nominated by President Nixon and confirmed by the United States Senate as United States Ambassador to Italy, a position he held until 1977. Volpe was snubbed by elements of the Italian elite/political establishment, due to his roots in southern Italy, and he upset leftist elements by making strong statements against the inclusion of the Italian Communist Party in its government. He was accused by the Italian Communist press of being "neo-Fascist" for his views.

== Death and legacy ==
Volpe died in Nahant, Massachusetts, on November 11, 1994, at the age of 85. He was buried at Forest Glade Cemetery in Wakefield, Massachusetts.

The John A. Volpe National Transportation Systems Center in Cambridge was named in his memory, as well as the Governor John A. Volpe Library at Wakefield High School in Wakefield. Volpe's papers are stored in the Archives and Special Collections of the Northeastern University Libraries, in Boston. Terminal E at Logan International Airport is also dedicated in his honor.

== Sources ==
- Fornasier, Roberto (2013). The Dove and the Eagle. Cambridge Scholars Publisher. ISBN 9781443844833.
- Gardner, Richard (2005). Mission Italy: On the Front Lines of the Cold War. Rowman & Littlefield. ISBN 9780742539983.
- Kilgore, Kathleen (1987). John Volpe, The Life of An Immigrant's Son. Yankee Books. ISBN 9780899091211.
- Rose, Mark H; Mohl, Raymond (2012). Interstate: Highway Politics and Policy Since 1939. University of Tennessee Press. ISBN 9781572337831.
- Wainstock, Dennis (2013). Election Year 1968: The Turning Point. Enigma Books. ISBN 9781936274413.

Party political offices
Preceded by Charles Gibbons	Republican nominee for Governor of Massachusetts; 1960, 1962, 1964, 1966	Succeeded by Francis W. Sargent
Political offices
Preceded by Foster Furcolo	Governor of Massachusetts; 1961–1963	Succeeded by Endicott Peabody
Preceded by Endicott Peabody	Governor of Massachusetts; 1965–1969	Succeeded by Francis W. Sargent
Preceded by William L. Guy	Chair of the National Governors Association; 1967–1968	Succeeded by Buford Ellington
Preceded by Alan Boyd	United States Secretary of Transportation; 1969–1973	Succeeded by Claude Brinegar
Diplomatic posts
Preceded by Graham Martin	United States Ambassador to Italy; 1973–1977	Succeeded by Richard N. Gardner
