= Electoral history of Ted Kennedy =

Elections contested by Ted Kennedy

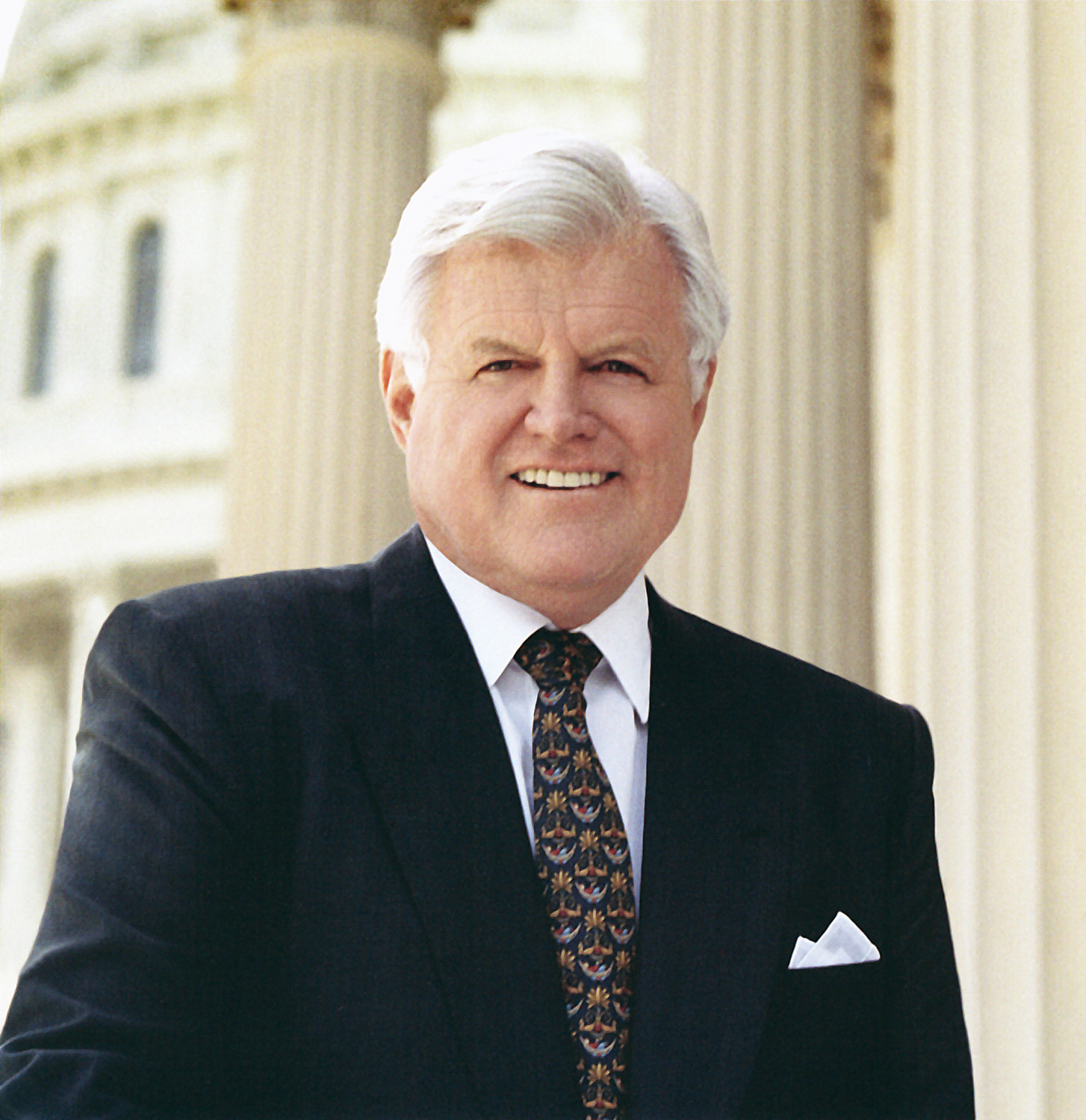
Senator Ted Kennedy (D-MA)

Electoral history of Ted Kennedy, United States Senator from Massachusetts (1962–2009) and, at the time of his death, the second most senior member of the Senate.

== United States Senate races ==
1962 U.S. Senate special election in Massachusetts
Primary election
Party	Candidate	Votes	%
Democratic	Ted Kennedy	559,303	69.33
Democratic	Edward J. McCormack Jr.	247,403	30.67
Total votes		806,706	100.00
General election
Democratic	Ted Kennedy	1,162,611	55.44
Republican	George C. Lodge	877,668	41.85
Independent	H. Stuart Hughes	50,013	2.38
Socialist Labor	Lawrence Gilfedder	5,330	0.25
Prohibition	Mark R. Shaw	1,439	0.07
Total votes		2,097,081	100.00
Democratic hold			

1964 U.S. Senate election in Massachusetts
Primary election
Party	Candidate	Votes	%
Democratic	Ted Kennedy (incumbent)	608,791	99.99
Write-in		32	0.01
Total votes		608,823	100.00
General election
Democratic	Ted Kennedy (incumbent)	1,716,907	74.26
Republican	Howard J. Whitmore Jr.	587,663	25.42
Socialist Labor	Lawrence Gilfedder	4,745	0.21
Prohibition	Grace F. Luder	2,700	0.12
Total votes		2,312,028	100.00
Democratic hold			

1970 U.S. Senate election in Massachusetts
Party	Candidate	Votes	%
Democratic	Ted Kennedy (incumbent)	1,202,856	62.16
Republican	Josiah Spaulding	715,978	37.00
Socialist Labor	Lawrence Gilfedder	10,378	0.54
Prohibition	Mark R. Shaw	5,944	0.31
Total votes		1,935,156	100.00
Democratic hold			

1976 U.S. Senate election in Massachusetts
Primary election
Party	Candidate	Votes	%
Democratic	Ted Kennedy (incumbent)	534,725	73.86
Democratic	Robert Dinsmore	117,496	16.23
Democratic	Frederick C. Langone	59,315	8.19
Democratic	Bernard Shannon (withdrawn)	12,399	1.71
Write-in		53	0.01
Total votes		723,988	100.00
General election
Democratic	Ted Kennedy (incumbent)	1,726,657	69.31
Republican	Michael Robertson	722,641	29.01
Socialist Workers	Carol Henderson Evans	26,283	1.06
U.S. Labor	H. Graham Lowry	15,517	0.62
Write-in		157	0.01
Total votes		2,491,255	100.00
Democratic hold			

1982 U.S. Senate election in Massachusetts
Party	Candidate	Votes	%
Democratic	Ted Kennedy (incumbent)	1,247,084	60.81
Republican	Ray Shamie	784,602	38.26
Libertarian	Howard S. Katz	18,878	0.92
Write-in		205	0.01
Total votes		2,050,769	100.00
Democratic hold			

1988 U.S. Senate election in Massachusetts
Party	Candidate	Votes	%
Democratic	Ted Kennedy (incumbent)	1,693,344	64.97
Republican	Joe Malone	884,267	33.93
New Alliance	Mary Fridley	15,208	0.58
Libertarian	Freda Lee Nason	13,199	0.51
Write-in		207	0.01
Total votes		2,606,225	100.00
Democratic hold			

1994 U.S. Senate election in Massachusetts
Primary election
Party	Candidate	Votes	%
Democratic	Ted Kennedy (incumbent)	391,637	98.87
Democratic	Others	4,498	1.13
Total votes		396,135	100.00
General election
Democratic	Ted Kennedy (incumbent)	1,266,011	58.07
Republican	Mitt Romney	894,005	41.01
Libertarian	Lauraleigh Dozier	14,484	0.66
LaRouche Was Right	William A. Ferguson Jr.	4,776	0.22
Write-in		688	0.03
Total votes		2,179,964	100.00
Democratic hold			

2000 U.S. Senate election in Massachusetts
Party	Candidate	Votes	%
Democratic	Ted Kennedy (incumbent)	1,889,494	72.69
Republican	Jack Robinson III	334,341	12.86
Libertarian	Carla Howell	308,860	11.88
Constitution	Philip F. Lawler	42,113	1.62
Independent	Dale E. Friedgen	13,687	0.53
Independent	Philip Hyde III	8,452	0.33
Write-in		2,473	0.10
Total votes		2,734,006	100.00
Democratic hold			

2006 U.S. Senate election in Massachusetts
Party	Candidate	Votes	%
General election
Democratic	Ted Kennedy (incumbent)	1,500,738	69.30
Republican	Kenneth Chase	661,532	30.55
Total votes		2,165,490	100.00
Democratic hold			

== Presidential and vice-presidential races ==
=== 1964 ===
1964 Massachusetts Democratic presidential primary:

All votes were cast as write-ins

- Lyndon B. Johnson (inc.) – 61,035 (72.91%)
- Robert F. Kennedy – 15,870 (18.96%)
- Henry Cabot Lodge Jr. – 2,269 (2.71%)
- Ted Kennedy – 1,259 (1.50%)
- Adlai Stevenson II – 952 (1.14%)
- George Wallace – 565 (0.68%)
- Hubert Humphrey – 323 (0.39%)

=== 1968 ===
1968 Democratic Party presidential primaries:

- Eugene McCarthy – 2,914,933 (38.73%)
- Robert F. Kennedy – 2,305,148 (30.63%)
- Stephen M. Young – 549,140 (7.30%)
- Lyndon B. Johnson (inc.) – 383,590 (5.10%)
- Thomas C. Lynch – 380,286 (5.05%)
- Roger D. Branigin – 238,700 (3.17%)
- George Smathers – 236,242 (3.14%)
- Hubert Humphrey – 166,463 (2.21%)
- Unpledged delegates – 161,143 (2.14%)
- Scott Kelly – 128,899 (1.71%)
- George Wallace – 34,489 (0.46%)
- Richard Nixon – 13,610 (0.18%)
- Ronald Reagan – 5,309 (0.07%)
- Ted Kennedy – 4,052 (0.05%)
- Paul C. Fisher – 506 (0.01%)
- John G. Crommelin – 186 (0.00%)

1968 Democratic National Convention (presidential tally):

- Hubert Humphrey – 1,760 (67.43%)
- Eugene McCarthy – 601 (23.03%)
- George McGovern – 147 (5.63%)
- Channing E. Phillips – 68 (2.61%)
- Daniel K. Moore – 18 (0.69%)
- Ted Kennedy – 13 (0.50%)
- Paul Bryant – 1 (0.04%)
- James H. Gray – 1 (0.04%)
- George Wallace – 1 (0.04%)

1968 Democratic National Convention (vice-presidential tally):

- Edmund Muskie – 1,945 (74.01%)
- Abstaining – 605 (23.02%)
- Julian Bond – 49 (1.87%)
- David C. Hoeh – 4 (0.15%)
- Ted Kennedy – 4 (0.15%)
- Eugene McCarthy – 3 (0.11%)
- Richard J. Daley – 2 (0.08%)
- Don Edwards – 2 (0.08%)
- George McGovern – 2 (0.08%)
- Robert McNair – 2 (0.08%)
- Abraham A. Ribicoff – 2 (0.08%)
- James Tate – 2 (0.08%)
- Allard Lowenstein – 1 (0.04%)
- Paul O'Dwyer – 1 (0.04%)
- Henry Reuss – 1 (0.04%)
- William F. Ryan – 1 (0.04%)
- Terry Sanford – 1 (0.04%)
- Sargent Shriver – 1 (0.04%)

1968 Liberal Party presidential convention:

- Hubert Humphrey – 199 (89.64%)
- Abstaining – 11 (4.96%)
- None of these candidates – 11 (4.96%)
- Ted Kennedy – 1 (0.45%)

=== 1972 ===
1972 Democratic Party presidential primaries:

- Hubert Humphrey – 4,121,372 (25.77%)
- George McGovern – 4,053,451 (25.34%)
- George Wallace – 3,755,424 (23.48%)
- Edmund Muskie – 1,840,217 (11.51%)
- Eugene McCarthy – 553,990 (3.46%)
- Henry M. Jackson – 505,198 (3.16%)
- Shirley Chisholm – 430,703 (2.69%)
- Terry Sanford – 331,415 (2.07%)
- John Lindsay – 196,406 (1.23%)
- Samuel Yorty – 79,446 (0.50%)
- Wilbur Mills – 37,401 (0.23%)
- Walter E. Fauntroy – 21,217 (0.13%)
- Unpledged – 19,533 (0.12%)
- Ted Kennedy – 16,693 (0.10%)
- Vance Hartke – 11,798 (0.07%)
- Patsy Mink – 8,286 (0.05%)
- None – 6,269 (0.04%)

1972 Democratic National Convention (presidential tally):

- George McGovern – 1,729 (57.37%)
- Henry M. Jackson – 525 (17.42%)
- George Wallace – 382 (12.67%)
- Shirley Chisholm – 152 (5.04%)
- Terry Sanford – 78 (2.59%)
- Hubert Humphrey – 67 (2.22%)
- Wilbur Mills – 34 (1.13%)
- Edmund Muskie – 25 (0.83%)
- Ted Kennedy – 13 (0.43%)
- Wayne L. Hays – 5 (0.17%)
- Eugene McCarthy – 2 (0.07%)
- Ramsey Clark, Walter Mondale – 1 each (0.03%)

1972 Democratic National Convention (vice-presidential tally):

- Thomas Eagleton – 1,742 (59.07%)
- Frances Farenthold – 405 (13.73%)
- Mike Gravel – 226 (7.66%)
- Endicott Peabody – 108 (3.66%)
- Clay Smothers – 74 (2.51%)
- Birch Bayh – 62 (2.10%)
- Peter W. Rodino – 57 (1.93%)
- Jimmy Carter – 30 (1.02%)
- Shirley Chisholm – 20 (0.68%)
- Moon Landrieu – 19 (0.64%)
- Edward T. Breathitt – 18 (0.61%)
- Ted Kennedy – 15 (0.51%)
- Fred R. Harris – 14 (0.48%)
- Richard G. Hatcher – 11 (0.37%)
- Harold Hughes – 10 (0.34%)
- Joseph Montoya – 9 (0.31%)
- William L. Guy – 8 (0.27%)
- Adlai Stevenson III – 8 (0.27%)
- Robert Bergland, Hodding Carter, César Chávez, Wilbur Mills – 5 each (0.17%)
- Wendell Anderson, Stanley Arnold, Ron Dellums, John J. Houlihan, Roberto A. Mondragon – 4 each (0.14%)
- Reubin O'Donovan Askew, Herman Badillo, Eugene McCarthy, Claiborne Pell, Terry Sanford – 3 each (0.10%)
- Ramsey Clark, Richard J. Daley, John DeCarlo, Ernest Gruening, Roger Mudd, Edmund Muskie, Claude Pepper, Abraham A. Ribicoff, Hoyt Patrick Taylor Jr., Leonard F. Woodcock, Bruno Agnoli – 2 each (0.07%)
- Ernest Albright, William A. Barrett, Daniel Berrigan, Philip Berrigan, Julian Bond, Skipper Bowles, Archibald Burton, Phillip Burton, William Chappell, Lawton Chiles, Frank Church, Robert Drinan, Nick Galifianakis, John Z. Goodrich, Michael Griffin, Martha Griffiths, Charles Hamilton, Patricia Harris, Jim Hunt, Daniel Inouye, Henry M. Jackson, Robery Kariss, Allard K. Lowenstein, Mao Zedong, Eleanor McGovern, Martha Beall Mitchell, Ralph Nader, George Norcross III, Jerry Rubin, Fred Seaman, Joe Smith, Benjamin Spock, Patrick Tavolacci, George Wallace – 1 each (0.03%)

=== 1976 ===
1976 Democratic Party presidential primaries:

- Jimmy Carter – 6,235,609 (39.27%)
- Jerry Brown – 2,449,374 (15.43%)
- George Wallace – 1,955,388 (12.31%)
- Mo Udall – 1,611,754 (10.15%)
- Henry M. Jackson – 1,134,375 (7.14%)
- Frank Church – 830,818 (5.23%)
- Robert Byrd – 340,309 (2.14%)
- Sargent Shriver – 304,399 (1.92%)
- Unpledged – 283,437 (1.79%)
- Ellen McCormack – 238,027 (1.50%)
- Fred R. Harris – 234,568 (1.48%)
- Milton Shapp – 88,254 (0.56%)
- Birch Bayh – 86,438 (0.54%)
- Hubert Humphrey – 61,992 (0.39%)
- Ted Kennedy – 19,805 (0.13%)
- Lloyd Bentsen – 4,046 (0.03%)
- Terry Sanford – 404 (0.00%)

1976 Democratic National Convention (presidential tally):

- Jimmy Carter – 2,239 (74.48%)
- Mo Udall – 330 (10.98%)
- Jerry Brown – 301 (10.01%)
- George Wallace – 57 (1.90%)
- Ellen McCormack – 22 (0.73%)
- Frank Church – 19 (0.63%)
- Hubert Humphrey – 10 (0.33%)
- Henry M. Jackson – 10 (0.33%)
- Fred R. Harris – 9 (0.30%)
- Milton Shapp, Robert Byrd – 2 each (0.07%)
- Hugh Carey, Cesar Chavez, Leon Jaworski, Barbara Jordan, Ted Kennedy, George McGovern, Edmund Muskie, Jennings Randolph, Fred Stover – 1 each (0.03%)

=== 1980 ===
1980 Democratic Party presidential primaries:

- Jimmy Carter (inc.) – 10,043,016 (51.13%)
- Ted Kennedy – 7,381,693 (37.58%)
- Unpledged – 1,288,423 (6.56%)
- Jerry Brown – 575,296 (2.93%)
- Lyndon LaRouche – 177,784 (0.91%)
- Cliff Finch – 48,032 (0.25%)

1980 Democratic National Convention (presidential tally):

- Jimmy Carter (inc.) – 2,123 (64.04%)
- Ted Kennedy – 1,151 (34.72%)
- William Proxmire – 10 (0.30%)
- Koryne Kaneski Horbal, Scott M. Matheson Sr. – 5 each (0.15%)
- Ron Dellums – 3 (0.09%)
- Robert Byrd, John Culver, Kent Hance, Jennings Randolph, Warren Spannaus, Alice Tripp – 2 each (0.06%)
- Jerry Brown, Dale Bumpers, Hugh L. Carey, Walter Mondale, Edmund Muskie, Thomas J. Steed – 1 each (0.03%)

== See also ==
- Electoral history of John F. Kennedy
- Electoral history of Barack Obama
- Electoral history of Joe Biden
- Electoral history of Kamala Harris
