= 1984 United States Senate election in Massachusetts =

- November 6, 1984
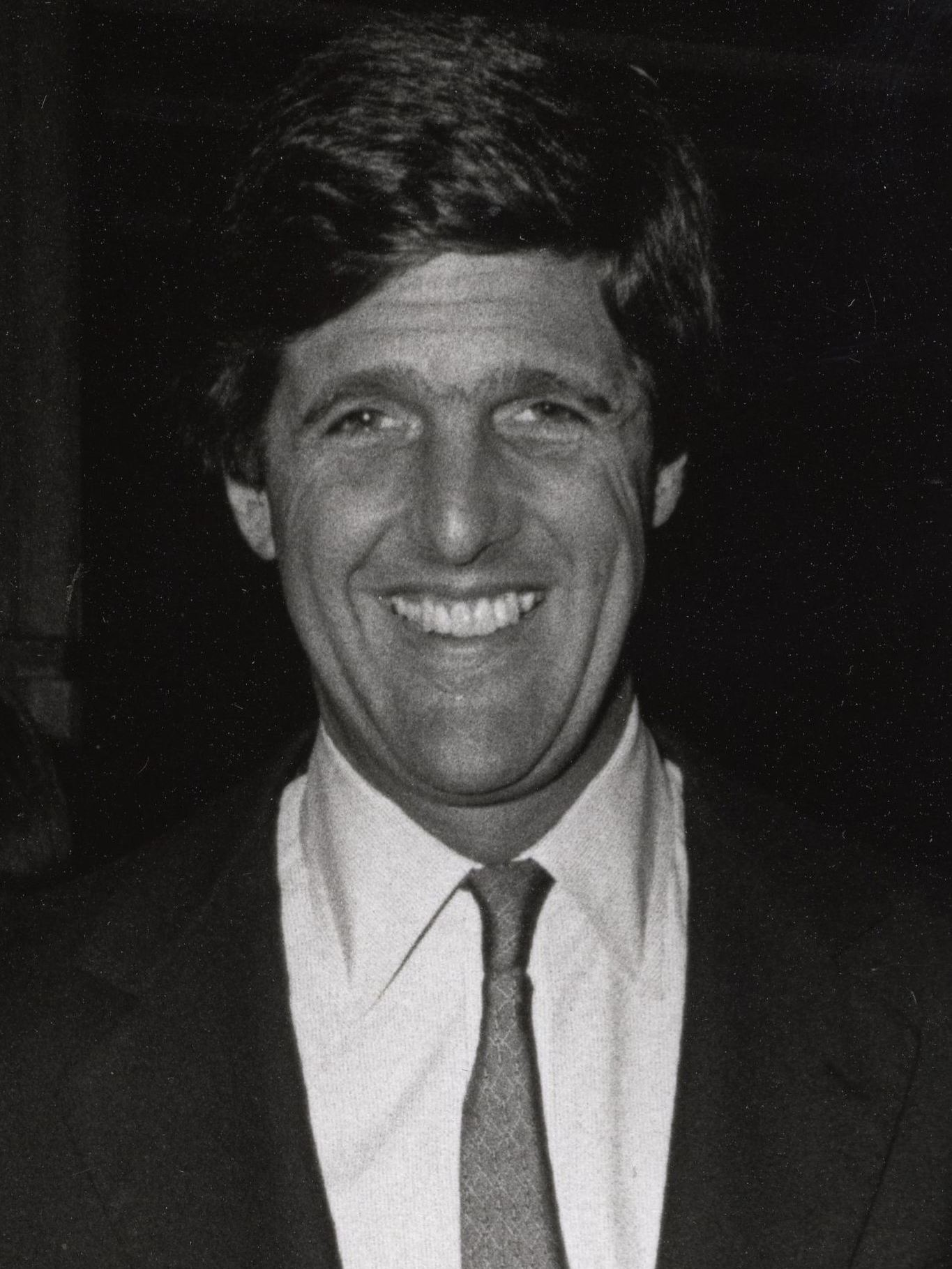

Nominee	John Kerry	Ray Shamie
Party	Democratic	Republican
Popular vote	1,392,981	1,136,806
Percentage	55.05%	44.93%
- Kerry: 50–60% 60–70% 70–80% 80–90% Shamie: 50–60% 60–70% 70–80%
U.S. senator before election
Paul Tsongas
Democratic
Elected U.S. Senator
John Kerry
Democratic

The 1984 United States Senate election in Massachusetts was held on November 6. Democratic incumbent Paul Tsongas declined to seek re-election to a second term in office after his diagnosis with lymphoma. In the open race, Democratic lieutenant governor John Kerry defeated Republican businessman Ray Shamie.

Primary elections were held on September 16. Kerry defeated U.S. representative James Shannon, David M. Bartley, and Michael J. Connolly to win the Democratic nomination. Shamie defeated Elliot Richardson, a more liberal and eminent member of his party, for the Republican nomination.

Kerry continued to serve as U.S. senator until his resignation in 2013 to serve as U.S. secretary of state in the cabinet of Barack Obama. In 2004, he was the Democratic Party nominee for president of the United States but was defeated by Republican incumbent George W. Bush.

== Democratic primary ==
=== Candidates ===
==== Declared ====
- David M. Bartley, Massachusetts secretary of administration and finance and former speaker of the Massachusetts House of Representatives
- Michael Connolly, secretary of the commonwealth of Massachusetts
- John Kerry, lieutenant governor of Massachusetts and founder of Vietnam Veterans Against the War
- James Shannon, U.S. representative from Lawrence

==== Withdrew ====
- Ed Markey, U.S. representative from Malden

==== Declined ====
- Francis Bellotti, former Massachusetts attorney general
- William Bulger, president of the Massachusetts Senate
- Michael Dukakis, incumbent governor of Massachusetts
- Edward J. King, former governor of Massachusetts
- Paul Tsongas, incumbent U.S. senator since 1979

To the surprise of many, Paul Tsongas retired, despite his very young age and popularity. In January, Tsongas disclosed his diagnosis with lymphoma, and cited his desire to spend more time with his family. By the month's end, four Democratic candidates announced they would run to succeed Tsongas. On the day of Tsongas's retirement, secretary of the commonwealth Michael J. Connolly announced, "I expect to be a candidate for the U.S. Senate." The first major candidate to declare was Ed Markey, a four-term U.S. representative from Malden who was nationally famous as a leading advocate for a nuclear freeze. He was soon joined by former Massachusetts House speaker David M. Bartley and lieutenant governor John Kerry.

In early February, U.S. representative James Shannon declared his candidacy. Shannon represented the same Lowell and Merrimack Valley seat which Tsongas had held before his 1978 election. He boasted support from U.S. House speaker Tip O'Neill and hoped to win the endorsement of Michael Dukakis, whom he had supported in the contentious 1978 gubernatorial primary.

=== Campaign ===
In early May, Markey shook up the race by announcing that he would withdraw to stand for re-election to his House seat. (Markey would later run for the seat successfully in the 2013 special election following Kerry's resignation.) Shannon got another boost when he won the endorsement of the Democratic state convention with 53 percent of the delegates. With backing from Tip O'Neill, Shannon secured the support of feminists and organized labor.

By June, the race shaped up as a two-way contest between Shannon and Kerry. Despite Shannon's victory at the convention, polls showed that Kerry led by nine points among likely voters. Polling also showed that Kerry was the strongest candidate to face Elliot Richardson, who led in Republican primary polling over Ray Shamie. Both candidates focused their attacks on Richardson, with Shannon stressing that Richardson would be an ineffective representative. Kerry, a Vietnam War veteran and anti-war activist, criticized Richardson for supporting of Richard Nixon's strategy in Vietnam and the United States bombings of Cambodia.

=== Debates ===
No.	Date	Hosts	Moderators	Link	Democratic	Democratic	Democratic	Democratic
Key: P Participant A Absent N Not invited I Invited W Withdrawn								
Key: P Participant A Absent N Not invited I Invited W Withdrawn					David M. Bartley	Michael J. Connolly	John Kerry	James Shannon
1	September 5, 1984	WCVB-TV	Mary Richardson	C-SPAN	P	P	P	P

=== Results ===
Kerry won a close race against Shannon by 24,529 votes, or 3.11 percent of votes cast.

Shannon attempted to replicate Tsongas's victory in the 1978 primary by performing extremely well in his home district, but he was unable to overcome Kerry's advantage throughout the rest of Massachusetts. Bartley performed well in his native Hampden County, especially in his hometown of Holyoke.

Municipal results of the Democratic primary

1984 Democratic U.S. Senate primary
Party	Candidate	Votes	%
Democratic	John Kerry	322,470	40.83%
Democratic	James Shannon	297,941	37.72%
Democratic	David M. Bartley	85,910	10.88%
Democratic	Michael Connolly	82,999	10.51%
Write-in		502	0.06%
Total votes		789,822	100.00%

== Republican primary ==
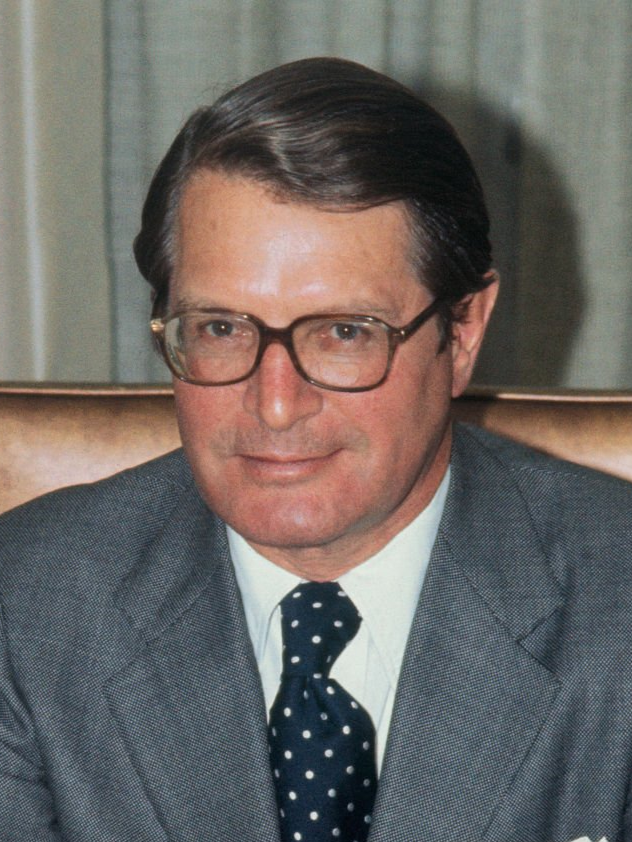
Former U.S. cabinet secretary Elliot Richardson was the early favorite for the seat.

=== Candidates ===
- Elliot Richardson, former member of the cabinets of Richard Nixon and Gerald Ford and Massachusetts attorney general
- Ray Shamie, businessman and 1982 nominee for U.S. senator

==== Withdrew ====
- Mildred Fay Jefferson, general surgeon at Boston University Medical Center and anti-abortion activist

==== Declined ====
- John Lakian, businessman and candidate for governor in 1982

=== Campaign ===
With Tsongas the early favorite for re-election, only conservative Ray Shamie, the 1982 nominee for Senate against Ted Kennedy, entered the race on the Republican side. However, Tsongas's retirement announcement in January presented the prospect of a divided Democratic Party and encouraged Republicans to contest the seat, which they held for over four decades prior to Tsongas's election.

In January, political operatives encouraged Elliot Richardson to run on behalf of President Ronald Reagan. Richardson, a former Massachusetts attorney general, cabinet official, and icon of opposition to the Watergate scandal, was at odds with the Reagan administration on foreign policy, but Reagan officials preferred him to Shamie nonetheless, as they considered Shamie incapable of winning the general election in the liberal state of Massachusetts. Richardson officially joined the race on March 19, citing "the preservation of peace" and casting himself as a supporter of Reagan's agenda.

Shamie attacked Richardson for his relatively late entry, moderate or liberal ideology, and membership in Boston elite society. Shamie cited his own support for the Kemp–Roth tax cut and Reagan's foreign policy while calling Richardson "a liberal, Rockefeller-type Republican who would be very comfortable in the Democratic Party." Despite Shamie's aggressive attacks, Richardson was still seen as leading as the summer campaign season began in earnest.

Throughout the campaign, Richardson was hampered by his dull speaking style and long service in Washington, which had kept him aloof from Massachusetts politics. He attempted to counter this image by meeting voters face-to-face and collecting signatures at town dumps. As the leading candidate in both parties, he faced frequent attacks from the Democratic contenders to his left, in addition to Shamie.

=== Debates ===
No.	Date	Hosts	Moderators	Link	Republican	Republican
Key: P Participant A Absent N Not invited I Invited W Withdrawn						
Key: P Participant A Absent N Not invited I Invited W Withdrawn					Elliot Richardson	Ray Shamie
1	September 6, 1984	WCVB-TV	Mary Richardson	C-SPAN	P	P

=== Polling ===
Poll source	Date(s) administered	Sample size	Margin of error	Mildred Jefferson	Elliot Richardson	Ray Shamie	Undecided
WHDH-AM/WCVB-TV	February 11–12, 1984	600	± 5.8%	3%	38%	29%	29%

=== Results ===
Despite his early lead in polls, Richardson failed to win the Republican nomination. Shamie easily won the September 18 primary with over 60 percent of the vote. Richardson managed to carry only a few municipalities in the Berkshires, Cape Cod, the wealthy Boston suburbs, and the liberal college towns of Amherst and Cambridge.

Municipal results of the Republican primary

1984 Republican U.S. Senate primary
Party	Candidate	Votes	%
Republican	Ray Shamie	173,851	62.38%
Republican	Elliot Richardson	104,761	37.59%
Write-in		70	0.03%
Total votes		278,682	100.00%

== General election ==
=== Candidates ===
- John Kerry, lieutenant governor of Massachusetts and founder of Vietnam Veterans Against the War (Democratic)
- Ray Shamie, businessman and 1982 nominee for U.S. senator (Republican)

=== Campaign ===
During the general election, Shamie sought to capitalize on the popularity of Ronald Reagan, who would go on to carry Massachusetts in the concurrent presidential election. In particular, he sought to make inroads with urban working-class and Roman Catholic voters, who were historically the base of the Massachusetts Democratic Party, by echoing Reagan's calls for tax reduction, a stronger United States military, and a ban on abortion.

The personal campaign between the two candidates was very bitter. Shamie claimed that Kerry would vote to raise taxes if elected and accused Kerry of lying when he claimed otherwise. Kerry attacked Shamie for his past connections to the John Birch Society and Liberty Lobby. Shamie countered that the John Birch Society was part of "mainstream America." Shamie spent nearly $1 million of his personal fortune on his campaign, primarily on television advertisements which The New York Times described as portraying Shamie as "a smiling, benign figure much like the President."

Late in the campaign, Massachusetts was identified as the best opportunity for Republicans to gain a seat in the Senate, and Reagan visited the state personally to campaign for him at Boston City Hall Plaza on November 1.

=== Fundraising ===
Campaign finance reports as of December 31, 1984
Candidate	Raised	Spent	Cash on hand
Ray Shamie (R)	$4,196,521	$4,180,961	$17,927
John Kerry (D)	$2,162,530	$2,169,038	$6,733
Source: Federal Election Commission

=== Post-primary endorsements ===
Ray Shamie (R)

U.S. executive branch officials

- Margaret Heckler, U.S. secretary of health and human services and former U.S. representative
- Ronald Reagan, 40th president of the United States
- Elliot Richardson, former U.S. attorney general, secretary of defense, and secretary of health and welfare and candidate for this seat

U.S. senators

- Barry Goldwater, U.S. senator from Arizona and nominee for president of the United States in 1964

Individuals

- Frank J. Fahrenkopf Jr., chair of the Republican National Committee

=== Polling ===
Poll source	Date(s) administered	Sample size	Margin of error	John Kerry (D)	Ray Shamie (R)	Undecided
Harrison and Goldberg Inc. (Note: Poll commissioned by The Boston Globe.)	October 1984	[data missing] (RV)	± 5.0%	50%	40%	10%
Harrison and Goldberg Inc.	October 1984	[data missing] (LV)	[data missing]	48%	44%	8%

=== Results ===
1984 U.S. Senate election in Massachusetts
Party	Candidate	Votes	%	±%
Democratic	John Kerry	1,392,981	55.05	▼0.01
Republican	Ray Shamie	1,136,806	44.93	▲0.08
Write-in		408	0.02	▼0.07
Total votes		2,530,195	100	
Democratic hold				

== See also ==
- United States Senate elections, 1984
- 1984 United States presidential election
