= 1986 Massachusetts elections =

1986 Massachusetts general election
- November 4, 1986

Part of the 1986 United States elections

A Massachusetts general election was held on November 4, 1986 in the Commonwealth of Massachusetts.

The election included:

- statewide elections for governor, lieutenant governor, attorney general, Secretary of the Commonwealth, treasurer, and auditor;
- district elections for U.S. Representatives, State Representatives, State Senators, and Governor's Councillors; and
- ballot questions at the state and local levels.

Democratic and Republican candidates were selected in party primaries held September 16, 1986.

== Governor and lieutenant governor ==
Democrats Michael Dukakis and Evelyn Murphy were elected governor and lieutenant governor, respectively, over Republican candidates George Kariotis and Nicholas Nikitas. Dukakis' victory made him the longest-serving governor in the history of Massachusetts.

== Attorney general ==
1986 Massachusetts Attorney General election
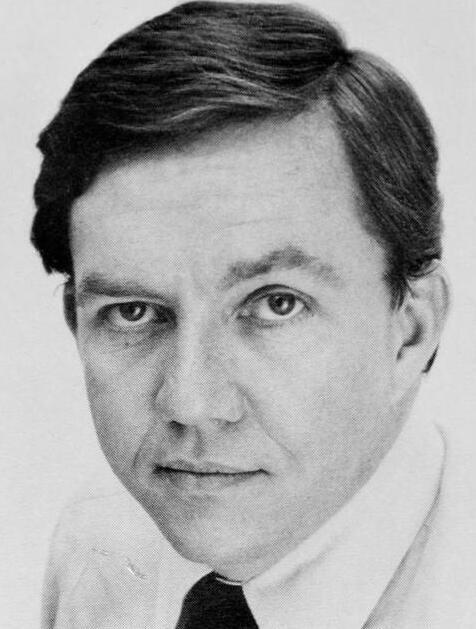

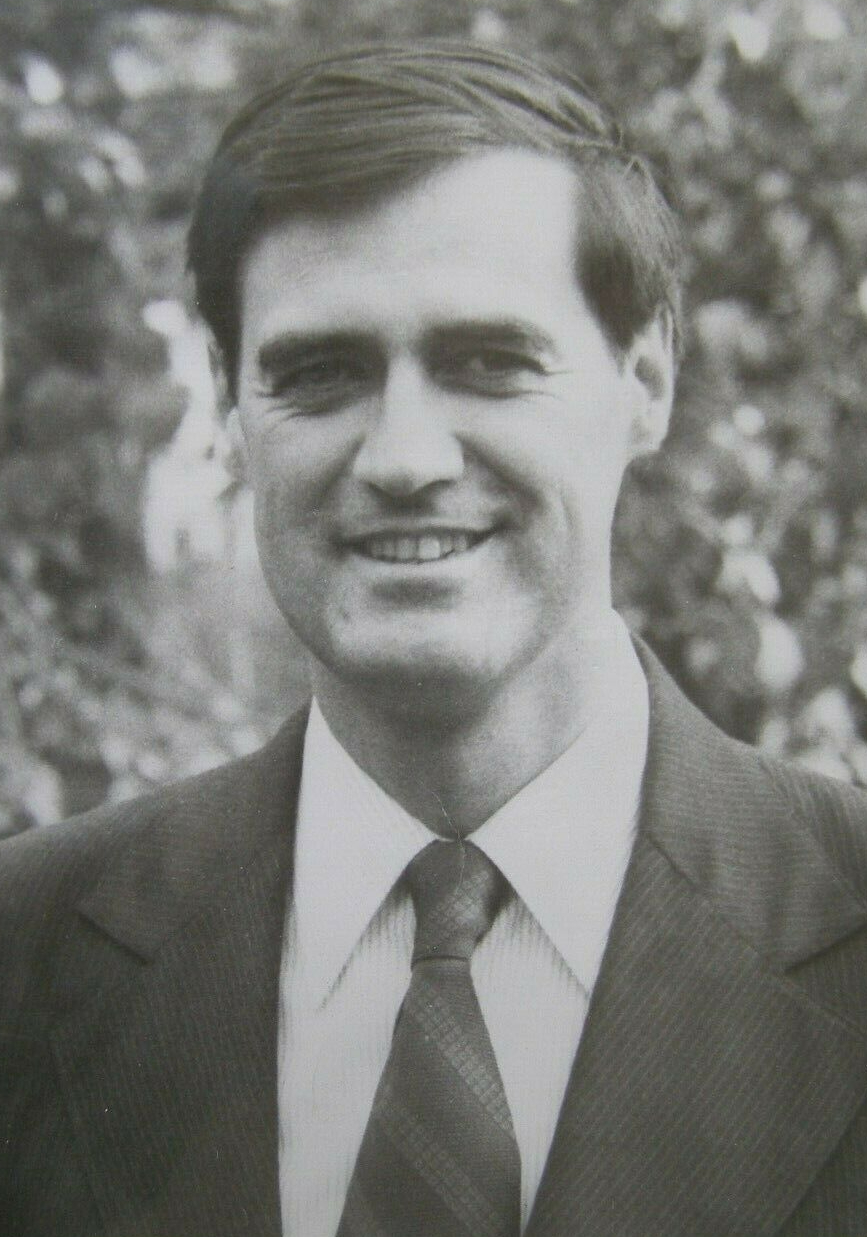
Nominee	James Shannon	Edward Francis Harrington
Party	Democratic	Republican
Popular vote	900,088	746,791
Percentage	54.7%	45.3%
Attorney General before election
Francis Bellotti
Democratic
Elected Attorney General
James Shannon
Democratic

Democrat James Shannon was elected attorney general. He defeated former assistant attorney general Joann Shotwell in the Democratic primary and U.S. Attorney Edward Francis Harrington in the general election.

=== Democratic primary ===
==== Candidates ====
- James Shannon, former U.S. Representative from Lowell and candidate for U.S. Senate in 1984
- Joann Shotwell, former Assistant Attorney General

==== Results ====
Massachusetts Attorney Democratic Primary, 1986
Party	Candidate	Votes	%
Democratic	James Shannon	402,744	68.12%
Democratic	Joann Shotwell	188,404	31.87%
Write-in		41	0.01%
Total votes		591,189	100.00%

=== General election ===
==== Candidates ====
- Edward Francis Harrington, former Democratic U.S. Attorney for the District of Massachusetts (Republican)
- James Shannon, former U.S. Representative from Lowell and candidate for U.S. Senate in 1984 (Democratic)

==== Results ====
Massachusetts Attorney General Election, 1986
Party	Candidate	Votes	%	±%
Democratic	James Shannon	900,088	54.65%	▼33.60
Republican	Edward Francis Harrington	746,791	45.34%	▲26.45
Write-in		136	0.01%	▲0.01
Total votes		1,647,015	100.00%	

== Secretary of the Commonwealth ==
1986 Massachusetts Secretary of the Commonwealth election
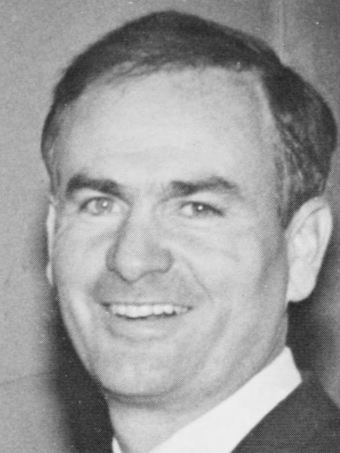

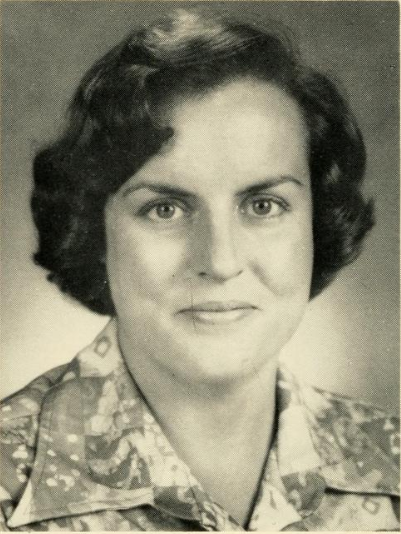
Nominee	Michael J. Connolly	Deborah R. Cochran
Party	Democratic	Republican
Popular vote	1,091,441	513,455
Percentage	68.0%	32.0%
Secretary of the Commonwealth before election
Michael J. Connolly
Democratic
Elected Secretary of the Commonwealth
Michael J. Connolly
Democratic

Incumbent Secretary of the Commonwealth Michael J. Connolly defeated former State Representative Deborah R. Cochran in the general election.

=== General election ===
==== Candidates ====
- Deborah R. Cochran, former State Representative from Dedham (Republican)
- Michael J. Connolly, incumbent Secretary of the Commonwealth (Democratic)

==== Results ====
Massachusetts Secretary of the Commonwealth Election, 1986
Party	Candidate	Votes	%	±%
Democratic	Michael J. Connolly (incumbent)	1,091,441	68.01%	▼4.61
Republican	Deborah R. Cochran	513,455	31.99%	▲7.79
Write-in		57	0.00%	Steady
Total votes		1,604,953	100.00%	

== Treasurer and Receiver-General ==
1986 Massachusetts Treasurer election
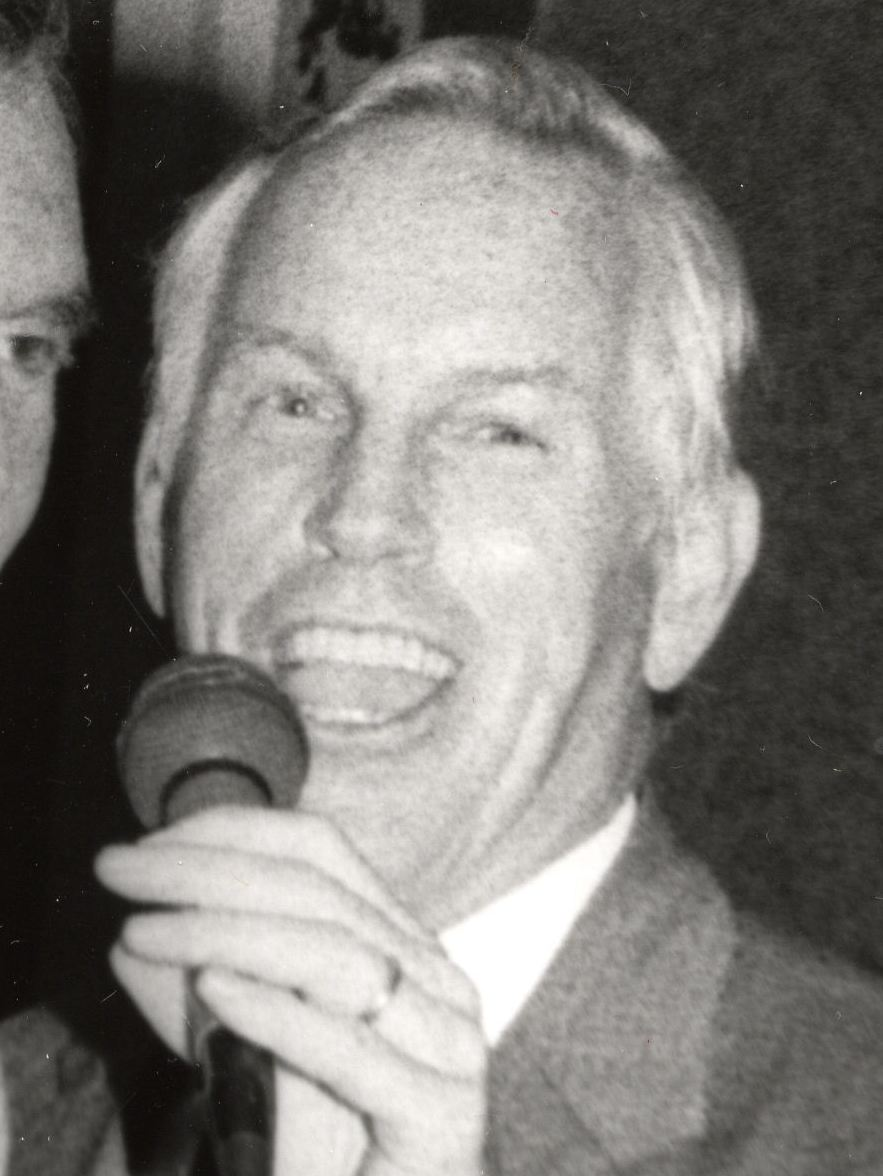

Nominee	Robert Q. Crane	L. Joyce Hampers
Party	Democratic	Republican
Popular vote	931,704	693,750
Percentage	57.3%	41.7%
Treasurer and Receiver-General before election
Robert Q. Crane
Democratic
Elected Treasurer and Receiver-General
Robert Q. Crane
Democratic

Incumbent Treasurer and Receiver-General Robert Q. Crane defeated Republican L. Joyce Hampers in the general election.

=== General election ===
==== Candidates ====
- Robert Q. Crane, incumbent Treasurer since 1964 (Democratic)
- L. Joyce Hampers (Republican)

==== Results ====
Massachusetts Treasurer and Receiver-General Election, 1986
Party	Candidate	Votes	%	±%
Democratic	Robert Q. Crane (incumbent)	931,704	57.31%	▼13.11
Republican	L. Joyce Hampers	693,750	41.67%	▲15.03
Write-in		403	0.03%	Steady
Total votes		1,625,857	100.00%	

== Auditor ==
1986 Massachusetts Auditor election
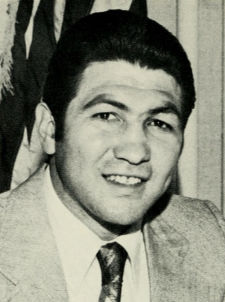

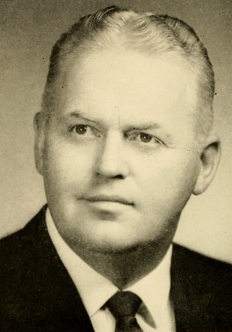
Nominee	A. Joseph DeNucci	William G. Robinson
Party	Democratic	Republican
Popular vote	1,001,236	583,299
Percentage	63.2%	36.8%
Auditor before election
John J. Finnegan
Democratic
Elected Auditor
A. Joseph DeNucci
Democratic

Incumbent Auditor John J. Finnegan did not run for reelection. Democrat A. Joseph DeNucci defeated Boston City Councilors Maura Hennigan and Charles Yancey in the Democratic primary and House Minority Leader William G. Robinson in the general election.

=== Democratic primary ===
==== Candidates ====
- A. Joseph DeNucci, State Representative from Newton and former professional boxer
- Maura Hennigan, member of the Boston City Council at-large
- Charles Yancey, member of the Boston City Council

==== Results ====
Massachusetts Auditor Democratic Primary, 1986
Party	Candidate	Votes	%
Democratic	A. Joseph DeNucci	307,272	54.02%
Democratic	Maura Hennigan	197,113	34.66%
Democratic	Charles Yancey	64,300	11.31%
Write-in		83	0.00%
Total votes		568,685	100.00%

=== Republican primary ===
==== Candidates ====
- William G. Robinson, State Representative from Melrose and Minority Leader of the House of Representatives
- Andrew Natsios, State Representative from Holliston and chairman of the Massachusetts Republican Party

==== Results ====
Massachusetts Auditor Republican Primary, 1986
Party	Candidate	Votes	%
Republican	William G. Robinson	42,794	54.53%
Republican	Andrew Natsios	35,632	45.40%
Write-in		51	0.07%
Total votes		78,477	100.00%

=== General election ===
Massachusetts Auditor General Election, 1986
Party	Candidate	Votes	%	±%
Democratic	A. Joseph DeNucci	1,001,236	63.19%	▼3.75
Republican	William G. Robinson	583,299	36.81%	▲7.56
Write-in		82	0.01%	▲0.01
Total votes		1,584,617	100.00%	

== Ballot questions ==
=== Question 1 ===
Proposed Legislative Amendment to the Constitution - The proposed constitutional amendment would allow the legislature to prohibit or regulate abortions to the extent permitted by the United States Constitution. It would also provide that the state constitution does not require public or private funding of abortions, or the provision of services of facilities for performing abortions, beyond what is required by the United States Constitution. The provisions of this amendment would not apply to abortions required to prevent the death of the mother.

Proposed Legislative Amendment to the Constitution
Candidate		Votes	%	±
	Yes	689,908	41.83%	
✓	No	959,311	58.17%	

=== Question 2 ===
Proposed Legislative Amendment to the Constitution - The proposed constitutional amendment would allow the expenditure of public funds for private schools and private school students.

Proposed Legislative Amendment to the Constitution
Candidate		Votes	%	±
	Yes	502,170	30.32%	
✓	No	1,154,069	69.68%	

=== Question 3 ===
Law Proposed by Initiative Petition - The proposed law would reduced then repeal the 7 1/2% surtax on Massachusetts state income taxes and would limit state tax revenue growth to the level of growth in the total wages and salaries of the citizens of the state.

Law Proposed by Initiative Petition
Candidate		Votes	%	±
✓	Yes	863,130	54.35%	
	No	724,925	45.65%	

=== Question 4 ===
Law Proposed by Initiative Petition - The proposed law would require that the State Department of Environmental Quality Engineering (DEQE) to search for sites in the Commonwealth where oil or hazardous materials have been disposed of and take all steps necessary to clean up those sites within specified time limits. Provisions are made for informing the public about sites in their communities.

Law Proposed by Initiative Petition
Candidate		Votes	%	±
✓	Yes	1,174,676	74.38%	
	No	404,521	25.62%	

=== Question 5 ===
Referendum on an Existing Law - The law requires all drivers and passengers to wear properly adjusted and fastened safety belts while traveling in motor vehicles on public ways.

Referendum on an Existing Law
Candidate		Votes	%	±
	Yes	769,806	46.31%	
✓	No	892,580	53.69%	

=== Question 6 ===
Law Proposed by Initiative Petition - The proposed law would provide a system of voter registration by mail applicable to all qualified voters and would eliminate statutory provisions permitting certain persons to vote only for presidential electors.

Law Proposed by Initiative Petition
Candidate		Votes	%	±
	Yes	603,370	38.44%	
✓	No	966,229	61.56%	
