= Edward F. Harrington =

American judge (1933–2025)

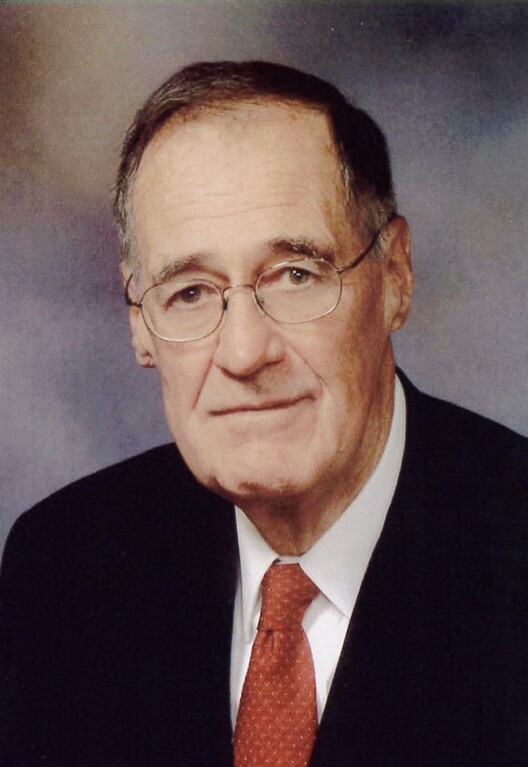

Senior Judge of the United States District Court for the District of Massachusetts
- In office March 1, 2001 – March 7, 2025

Judge of the United States District Court for the District of Massachusetts
- In office February 22, 1988 – March 1, 2001
- Appointed by: Ronald Reagan
- Preceded by: Andrew Augustine Caffrey
- Succeeded by: Seat abolished

United States Attorney for the District of Massachusetts
- In office August 1, 1977 – November 1, 1981
- Appointed by: Jimmy Carter
- Preceded by: James N. Gabriel
- Succeeded by: Bill Weld

Personal details
- Born: September 16, 1933 Fall River, Massachusetts, U.S.
- Died: March 7, 2025 (aged 91) Providence, Rhode Island, U.S.
- Party: Democratic (before 1984); Republican (1984–2025)
- Spouse: Ellen Erisman
- Children: 6
- Relatives: Edward Harrington (grandfather)
- Education: College of the Holy Cross (BA); Boston College (JD)
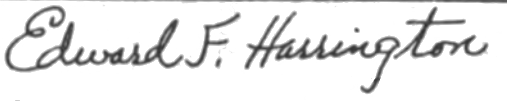
- Signature

Military service
- Branch: United States Navy
- Service years: 1955–1957 (active); 1957–1972 (reserves)
- Rank: Lieutenant

Edward Francis Harrington (September 16, 1933 – March 7, 2025) was an American lawyer who served as a senior United States district judge of the United States District Court for the District of Massachusetts.

== Background ==
Harrington was born in Fall River, Massachusetts, on September 16, 1933. He graduated from Sacred Heart Grammar School in 1947, and then from B.M.C. Durfee High School in 1951 with high honors. His grandfather, Edward F. Harrington was a member of the Massachusetts House of Representatives.

Harrington graduated cum laude with a Bachelor of Arts from College of the Holy Cross in 1955 and with a Juris Doctor from Boston College Law School in 1960. At Holy Cross, Harrington was a member of the Naval ROTC. At Boston College Law School, he was on the Dean's List and a member of the Law Review. He became a member of the Massachusetts Bar in 1960.

He served on active duty in the United States Navy from 1955 to 1957 on destroyer escorts as the gunnery officer, and was a Lieutenant Junior Grade. He was in the United States Navy Reserve from 1957 to 1972. He was a law clerk to Chief Justice Paul C. Reardon of the Massachusetts Superior Court from 1960 to 1961.

Harrington married Ellen Mary Erisman of Greenfield, Massachusetts, on July 27, 1957. They had six children and 23 grandchildren. He died in Providence, Rhode Island, on March 7, 2025, at the age of 91.

== Career ==
Harrington was a trial attorney in the Criminal Division of the United States Department of Justice in Washington, D.C., from 1961 to 1965. While at the Department of Justice, Harrington was a member of the special prosecution group conducting the nationwide probe of racketeering in the Teamsters Union. As one of the fifteen members of Robert F. Kennedy's so-called "Hoffa Squad", he investigated illegalities in James Hoffa's Teamsters Union. During the so-called "long hot summer of 1964," Harrington was a member of a select team of attorneys dispatched to the State of Mississippi by Attorney General Robert Kennedy to protect the civil rights workers who were conducting "freedom schools" in voter registration there. During this assignment, he was involved in the grand jury investigation of the murders of three civil rights workers in Philadelphia, Mississippi during that summer.

He was an assistant United States attorney for the District of Massachusetts from 1965 to 1969. In that capacity, he participated in the successful prosecution and appeal of Raymond L. S. Patriarca, the alleged boss of the New England organized crime family, in 1968 for interstate racketeering. The chief government witness in the Patriarca case, Joseph Barboza, was one of the first organized crime figures to break the "code of silence." The security procedures used to protect accomplice witness Barboza formed the basis for the Witness Protection Program, which was formally established by the U.S. Congress in 1970.

In 1969, Harrington became the Deputy Attorney In Charge of the newly created U.S. Department of Justice's Strike Force against Organized Crime for the New England area and was the Attorney In Charge from 1970 to 1973. During this period, major gangland accomplice witnesses, such as Vincent C. Teresa and John J. Kelley, were developed. Their testimony resulted in the convictions of numerous significant underworld figures. Teresa was the chief witness in 1971 before the Permanent Senate Subcommittee investigating organized criminal securities fraud in the Wall Street brokerage houses. The "Strike Force" installed the first court-authorized wiretap in the District of Massachusetts in 1970.

From 1973 to 1977, Harrington was in private practice in Boston, Massachusetts.

In 1974, he was a candidate for the Democratic Party's nomination for Attorney General of Massachusetts. He was defeated by Francis X. Bellotti in the primary election, where he finished third in a six-person race.

In August 1977, Harrington was appointed by President Carter as the United States Attorney for the District of Massachusetts. During his term, the United States Attorney's Office successfully prosecuted members of the Boston School Committee and initiated grand jury investigations into corruption in Boston City Hall, resulting in the conviction of several municipal political figures. The Office also assisted the Ward Commission, which had been established by the State Legislature, in its probe of corruption in the awarding of state construction contracts and its reform of the awarding process. The Office's investigation resulted in the conviction of a member of the State Senate. See, In Re United States, Petitioner 666Fed.2d690 (1st Cir. 1981), a Petition for a Writ of Mandamus filed by the United States seeking the Court of Appeals to order the trial judge to recuse himself from the case. Petition was denied. However, a new trial judge was reassigned to the case upon remand to the District Court. During his term as U.S. Attorney, five members of the notorious "Winter Hill Gang" were convicted in the so-called "Horse Race Fix" case of 1979, including its leader, Howie Winter. The Office supervised the planting of the court-authorized "bugging" of the headquarters of the Boston organized crime family in 1980, which resulted in the successful prosecution and demise of the Angiulo organized criminal organization. James "Whitey" Bulger was one of the confidential informants supporting the affidavit submitted to the Court.

The U.S. Attorney's Office was involved in the landmark Turkette case in which the U.S. Supreme Court in 1981 construed the term "enterprise" in the RICO statute to include illegal, as well as legal, enterprises.

As U.S. Attorney, he served as a member of the United States Attorney General's Advisory Committee of United States Attorneys from 1977 to 1980, and coordinated the security arrangements for Pope John Paul II's visit to Boston in 1979. Harrington left the U.S. Attorney's Office in November 1981, and entered the private practice of law with Sheridan, Garrahan and Lander with offices in Framingham, Massachusetts, where he was engaged in trial practice.

In 1983 and 1984, he was engaged in the "Barczak controversy" − the public debate over the State Attorney General's investigation of Governor King's Revenue Department during the 1982 gubernatorial primary campaign between former Governor Michael Dukakis and Governor Edward J. King. He believed Barczak's charge of "widespread corruption" in the department to have been politically motivated and never established. The "Barczak affair" induced him to run for Attorney General in 1986.

In 1986, he was the Republican Party's candidate for Attorney General of Massachusetts, but he lost in the general election to Democrat James Shannon, 55% to 45%.

In 2002, Harrington testified for the defense in the federal RICO trial of FBI agent John J. Connolly, and again in 2008 in the Florida state murder trial of Connolly, who was convicted of second degree murder for assisting James "Whitey" Bulger. In both cases, Harrington's testimony related to Connolly's contribution to the decimation of the New England Mafia.

Upon announcing his retirement in 2023, Judge Harrington wrote that "As a Judge, I had no agenda other than to try to resolve disputes justly and expeditiously under established principles of law."

=== Federal judicial service ===
On September 18, 1987, Harrington was nominated by President Ronald Reagan to a seat on the United States District Court for the District of Massachusetts vacated by Judge Andrew Augustine Caffrey. Harrington was confirmed by the United States Senate on February 19, 1988, and received his commission on February 22, 1988. He assumed senior status on March 1, 2001. He was a member of the Judicial Conference of the United States Committee on the Administration of the Bankruptcy System from 1992 to 1999 and again from 2005 to 2011.

Harrington helped shape the novel "fraud on the market" doctrine in security fraud cases, adopted the controversial use of "repressed memory" in sexual abuse cases, formulated the scholastic standards required of learning-disabled students in private schools, required standards for public school teachers and due diligence for federal regulators of the fishing industry, fashioned discovery rules for electronic documents, and upheld the supremacy of the cell-phone tower statute over local zoning regulations.

He participated in many major patent cases involving significant inventions in the medical, electronic, and communication fields, and applied the anti-trust theory to "buy-out" companies’ conspiring to depress the value of corporations intended to be acquired. His opinions in McGuire v. Reilly resolved the contentious confrontations between anti-abortion protesters and women's health clinic employees outside a Brookline clinic by imposing on equal protection grounds the same counseling restrictions on both adversaries.

== Sources ==
- Confirmation hearings on federal appointments : hearings before the Committee on the Judiciary, United States Senate, One Hundredth Congress, first session, on confirmation of appointments to the federal judiciary and the Department of Justice pt.4 (1988)

Party political offices
Preceded by Richard L. Wainwright	Republican nominee for Attorney General of Massachusetts; 1986	Succeeded by William C. Sawyer
Legal offices
Preceded by James N. Gabriel	United States Attorney for the District of Massachusetts; 1977–1981	Succeeded by Bill Weld
Preceded by Andrew Augustine Caffrey	Judge of the United States District Court for the District of Massachusetts; 1988–2001	Succeeded by Seat abolished
