= David M. Bartley =

American politician (1935–2023)

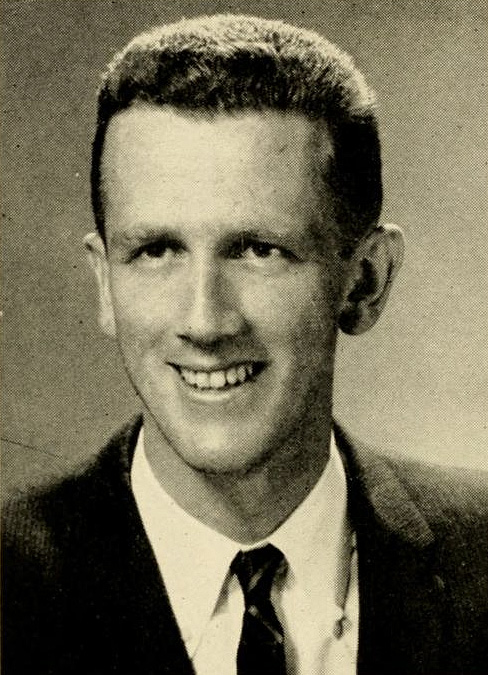
- Bartley as a member of the Massachusetts House, 1963

Massachusetts Secretary of Administration and Finance
- In office 1982–1983
- Governor: Edward J. King
- Preceded by: Edward Hanley
- Succeeded by: Frank Keefe

2nd President of Holyoke Community College
- In office 1975–2004
- Preceded by: George E. Frost
- Succeeded by: William F. Messner

79th Speaker of the Massachusetts House of Representatives
- In office 1969–1975
- Preceded by: Robert H. Quinn
- Succeeded by: Thomas W. McGee

Majority Leader of the Massachusetts House of Representatives
- In office 1968–1968
- Preceded by: Robert H. Quinn
- Succeeded by: Thomas W. McGee

Member of the Massachusetts House of Representatives from the 7th Hampden District
- In office 1963–1976

Personal details
- Born: February 9, 1935 Holyoke, Massachusetts, U.S.
- Died: June 13, 2023 (aged 88)
- Party: Democratic
- Spouse: Bette Bartley
- Children: David K. Bartley; Suz Bartley; Myles Bartley
- Education: Holyoke Junior College; University of Massachusetts (B.A., Ed.M.)

Military service
- Allegiance: United States of America

David Michael Bartley (February 9, 1935 – June 13, 2023) was an American politician and educator who served as a member of the Massachusetts House of Representatives from 1963 to 1975, Speaker of the Massachusetts House of Representatives from 1969 to 1975, Secretary of Administration and Finance from 1982 to 1983, and President of Holyoke Community College from 1975 to 2004. In 1974, along with J. John Fox, he co-sponsored the Bartley-Fox law, which passed that year and took effect on April 1, 1975. The law forces judges to sentence people convicted of carrying a gun without a firearm identification card to at least one year in jail.

Bartley ran for the United States Senate in 1984, finishing third in the Democratic primary behind Lieutenant Governor John Kerry and 5th congressional district representative James Shannon.

Bartley died on June 13, 2023, at the age of 88.

== See also ==
- 1969-1970 Massachusetts legislature
- 1971–1972 Massachusetts legislature
- 1973–1974 Massachusetts legislature

== Bibliography ==
- The Springfield Republican, HCC ceremony Monday, (December 8, 2006 ).

Massachusetts House of Representatives
Preceded by Robert H. Quinn	Majority Leader of the Massachusetts House of Representatives; 1968–1968	Succeeded by Thomas W. McGee
Preceded by Robert H. Quinn	Speaker of the Massachusetts House of Representatives; 1969–1975	Succeeded by Thomas W. McGee
Academic offices
Preceded by George E. Frost, Jr.	President of Holyoke Community College; 1975–2004	Succeeded by William F. Messner
