= Herb Connolly =

American politician

Member of the Massachusetts Governor's Council
- In office 1969–1989
- Preceded by: John J. Craven Jr.
- Succeeded by: Robert B. Kennedy
- Constituency: 2nd District (1969–75); 3rd District (1975–89)

Personal details
- Born: February 28, 1922 Brookline, Massachusetts
- Died: April 8, 1995 (aged 73) Framingham, Massachusetts
- Resting place: Newton Cemetery; Newton, Massachusetts
- Party: Democratic
- Education: Boston University
- Occupation: Auto dealer Governor's Councilor

Herbert L. Connolly (1922–1995) was an American auto dealer and politician who was a member of the Massachusetts Governor's Council from 1969 to 1989.

== Early life ==
Connolly was born on February 28, 1922, in Brookline, Massachusetts. He attended Boston Public Schools and graduated from Boston University. After graduation, Connolly worked as an instructor at the Wentworth Institute. During World War II he served in the United States Army in the European theater.

== Business career ==
After the war, Connolly joined his family's auto business in Brighton, then called Herb Connolly Buick. In 1974, the business moved to Framingham. He also established Herb Connolly Acura in Framingham.

== Politics ==
In 1962, Connolly was a candidate for Lieutenant Governor of Massachusetts. He lost to Francis X. Belotti 57% to 43% in the Democratic primary. After the loss, Connolly served as a secretary to Governor Endicott Peabody. He ran for Lieutenant Governor a second time in 1966, but once again lost the in primary, this time to Joseph E. McGuire 55% to 45%.

In 1968, Connolly was elected to the Massachusetts Governor's Council. In 1988 he lost the Democratic primary to Lowell City Councilor Robert B. Kennedy by one vote - 14,716 to 14,715. At the time of his defeat, Connolly's residency was being challenged by Republican candidate Jody Dow. The address Connolly used on the ballot was a Newton home that he had sold in May 1981. He insisted that he had kept an apartment at the Newton home and used it as his voting address. He and his family moved to a smaller house in Framingham in the early 1980s when car sales dipped. Framingham was not in Connolly's district. Connolly would later admit that he had not voted for himself because he was busy campaigning and did not get to the polls until after they had closed.

== Personal life ==
Connolly was married to Mary Uhl. They had had three sons.

Connolly was active in many charitable organizations. For 25 years he was president of United Cerebral Palsy of Greater Boston. He also served as a director of the Massachusetts Cancer Control Clinic, the Kennedy Memorial Hospital, the Denver Jewish Hospital, Massachusetts Association of the Blind, the Massachusetts Kidney Foundation, the Children's Asthma Research Institute, and the Massachusetts Chamber of Commerce.

== Death ==
Connolly died on April 8, 1995, at his home in Framingham.
