= Bartley-Fox Law =

Massachusetts mandatory minimum sentencing law

The Bartley-Fox Law (also known as the Bartley-Fox Amendment) is a Massachusetts law that sets a one-year mandatory minimum sentence for anyone found to be illegally carrying a firearm. It was passed by the Massachusetts General Court in 1974 and took effect in April 1975. Studies on its effectiveness have been mixed, and its strict provisions have been subject to criticism.

== Background and passage ==
The Bartley-Fox Law was co-sponsored by, and named after, Speaker of the Massachusetts House of Representatives David M. Bartley and retired judge J. John Fox. The text mandates a one-year prison sentence for anyone convicted of possession of a firearm without a license in the state of Massachusetts, and added two years to the sentence of anyone convicted of committing a crime with a gun. Bartley-Fox passed the Massachusetts General Court without any significant opposition, becoming the first such law ever to be enacted in the United States. The law was originally intended to come into effect in January 1975, but Bartley led an effort to delay it until April 1 to ensure that the state's citizens were fully aware of the significant penalties.

To accomplish this, Bartley-Fox was accompanied by extensive publicity of the fact that the ban on unlicensed possession of handguns would now be strictly enforced. As part of the campaign, TV spots aired beginning in February 1975 with the slogan "If you are caught with a gun, you will go to prison for a year and nobody can get you out." Despite these efforts, newspapers reported in April that authorities were "swamped" with individuals trying to obtain the legally required gun licenses and firearm identification cards.

In July 1975, Bartley and Fox authored an op-ed in The New York Times, where they stated that the law was "designed to remove the temptation to carry guns and thereby reduce the chance that they will be used ... Only the person who insists on carrying a weapon without legal authority need fear this law." Two months later, they wrote a letter to the editor of the same paper after the two attempted assassinations of US President Gerald Ford:

After each assassination or assassination attempt, "gun control" prompts a brief flurry of outrage at the promiscuous use of guns in our society. People express serious interest in controlling gun abuse. Then, as the gun lobbyists go to work and apathy and resignation set in, the problem disappears from public view. We renew our interest only when a gun barrel is pointed at a President. / Any society with a sane firearms policy would have prevented the woman who tried to kill President Ford from carrying a gun. The lenient way in which illegal possession of firearms is treated by courts is one reason for the rapid rise in crime. ... / Since the [Bartley-Fox Law] has been in effect, police officers report fewer guns on Massachusetts streets. It should serve as a model for national legislation. ... / It is another chance to consider the plight not only of Presidents but of average citizens faced with uncontrolled gun abuse.

== Effects ==
Politically, the Bartley-Fox Law was criticized by both sides of the United States' gun debate. Pro-gun advocates like the National Rifle Association (NRA) opposed it for placing restrictions on a person's ability to carry a gun, with one NRA spokesperson stating that "it only affects the lawful gun owner, who is turned into a criminal." Gun control advocates, on the other hand, opposed the law's one year mandatory minimum sentence. Still, a 1981 Gallup opinion poll indicated that 62% of Americans would support state-level legislation like Bartley-Fox, although 58% would oppose any law that would ban handguns—including Massachusetts, which in the same year rejected such a measure for the seventh straight time. Also in 1981, the administration of Governor Edward J. King removed what they called "unfriendly" signs on Massachusetts state borders that advertised the Bartley-Fox Law, in an effort to increase tourism.

Early research and reporting on the law's effects was mixed. In May 1975, one month after Bartley-Fox went into effect, The New York Times reported that year-over-year gun violence was down for April—a "fragmentary kind of statistic, the sort of preliminary number from which it is dangerous to generalize," in the paper's view, but Massachusetts officials saw it as the "first faint suggestion that the tough new legislation may work." One year later, James Vorenberg released a report concluding that in the first year of the law, it had not significantly affected Massachusetts' violent crime rate, nor had it significantly reduced the rate at which guns were used in robberies and other premeditated crimes.

A 1977 study by James A. Beha, II concluded that after the law had taken effect, people were being sentenced to prison for illegally carrying firearms five times more often than before it had taken effect. His findings also indicated that criminal justice officials did not frequently attempt to evade the mandatory sentences imposed by the law; instead, people charged with illegal carrying of firearms were generally either convicted in accordance with the law, or were found not guilty. Another 1977 study by Deutsch and Alt reported that the law was associated with a decline in gun assaults and armed robberies, though this finding has been challenged by other researchers. In 1979, Glenn L. Pierce, William J. Bowers, and other researchers reported that the law reduced the rate of gun assault and armed robbery in Boston, and that it also had the unintended effect of increasing citizens' reporting of crime there. Similarly, Pierce and Bowers reported in 1981 that the law reduced the rate of gun assaults and criminal homicides in Boston, but that the punishments actually imposed by the law did not seem to be responsible for this reduction. They also reported that the decline in gun assaults was more than offset by an increase in non-gun armed assaults.

In 1983, James Q. Wilson argued in The Atlantic that:

In sum, the Bartley-Fox law seems, at least during the years in which its effect was studied, to have increased the risk associated with carrying a gun, to have reduced the frequency with which guns were casually carried, and thereby to have reduced the rate at which certain gun-related crimes were committed.

In 1986, the law was subject to criticism after Sylvester Lindsey, a Massachusetts citizen from Cambridge, was sentenced to the one-year mandatory minimum sentence after using an unlicensed gun in an undisputed case of self-defense. In a unanimous opinion, the Massachusetts Supreme Judicial Court stated that there was no leeway in the law for the court to consider any alternative, even though "it is possible that the defendant is alive today only because he carried a gun that day for protection." The controversy led to a series of articles in The Boston Globe, and Lindsey's sentence was eventually commuted by the Massachusetts Governor's Council.

In 1989, the Globe noted that crime had increased significantly in the lower-income neighborhoods of Boston, leading "some public officials to question whether Bartley-Fox has lived up to its promise." The same article noted that some officials had been critical of the law for not being tough enough, stating, "The one-year mandatory jail term, officials say, applies to people who illegally carry a firearm on their person, but not to those who unlawfully maintain a gun on private property." One year later, the Globe reported that increased enforcement of the law had resulted in a reduction in the number of pending cases working through Boston's legal system, from 86 to 8. In addition the force caught 36 fugitives who had been evading their prison sentences, and were able to remove 16 names due to court acquittals and deaths.

In a 1997 book Targeting Guns: Firearms and Their Control, criminologist Gary Kleck argues that even if one assumes that the Bartley-Fox Law was effective in reducing crime in Massachusetts, this may not mean that different mandatory sentencing gun-carrying laws would be effective if they were implemented elsewhere. A 2004 National Research Council report concluded that "collectively, this body of research seems to suggest [that the Bartley-Fox Law had] a broad impact on gun crime in Boston. However, it is unclear whether the firearms sentencing enhancement or the mandatory sentence for illegal gun-carrying generated the impact."

== See also ==
- Constitutional carry
- Gun laws in Massachusetts
