= Glenn L. Pierce =

American criminologist

- Education: Northeastern University (Ph.D., 1989)
- Known for: Gun violence research using gun tracing data
- Scientific career
- Fields: Sociology, criminology
- Workplaces: Northeastern University
- Thesis: Gun control: the long-term impact of the Bartley-Fox law on violent crime in Massachusetts: a dissertation (1989)

Glenn L. Pierce is an American criminologist and principal research scientist at Northeastern University's College of Social Sciences and Humanities. He is also the director of the Institute for Security and Public Policy at Northeastern. He is known for his research that uses gun tracing data to track the sources and movement of guns used in crimes. With William J. Bowers, he has also studied the putative deterrent effect of capital punishment in the United States, and the effect of the Bartley-Fox Law on violent crime rates.

Pierce has been criticized for receiving $7.8 million from Immigration and Customs Enforcement (ICE) for doing dual-use technologies research through Northeastern University.
