= J. John Fox =

American judge (died 1999)

J. John Fox (d. October 4, 1999 in Needham, Massachusetts) was an American judge known for his central role in the founding of the University of Massachusetts Medical School in Worcester, Massachusetts.

== Biography ==
Fox was born John Fox in Paterson, New Jersey, and grew up in Boston, Massachusetts. He attended Boston University as an undergraduate before enrolling in Boston University Law School. He gained the nickname "Just John Fox" after a professor asked him his name, to which he replied "John Fox." The professor replied by asking, "Just John Fox?" and Fox replied "Yes, just John Fox". In the late 1930s, he began working for the first gubernatorial campaign of Paul A. Dever, one of his law school classmates. During World War II, he served in the United States Navy and received a Bronze Star for his service in the invasion of the Marshall Islands and Mariana Islands.

In 1948, he began a four-year stint as Dever's chief secretary, which ended in 1952 when then-Massachusetts Governor Dever appointed Fox as an associate judge on the Boston Municipal Court. In 1960, he was named a probate judge of the Norfolk Probate Court by Governor Foster Furcolo. He retired from the bench in 1973.

In the early 1960s, he fought, ultimately successfully, for the creation of a public medical school in Massachusetts. This school is now known as the University of Massachusetts Medical School. In 1974, he co-sponsored the strict gun-control Bartley-Fox Law in the Massachusetts State Legislature, along with David M. Bartley.

He died in 1999 in Needham, Massachusetts, at the age of 95.
