= Joe Malone (politician) =

American businessman and politician

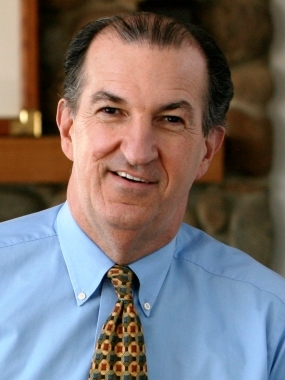
- Malone in 2010

54th Treasurer and Receiver-General of Massachusetts
- In office January 3, 1991 – January 7, 1999
- Governor: William Weld; Paul Cellucci
- Preceded by: Robert Crane
- Succeeded by: Shannon O'Brien

Personal details
- Born: Joseph Daniel Malone; November 18, 1954 (age 71) Newton, Massachusetts, U.S.
- Party: Independent (since 2013)
- Other political affiliations: Republican (before 2013)
- Education: Harvard University (BA)

Joseph Daniel Malone (born November 18, 1954) is an American businessman, former Treasurer and Receiver-General of Massachusetts, and a former member of the Republican Party. In 2010, Malone ran for the Republican nomination for Congress in Massachusetts's 10th congressional district. In 2013, he announced he was leaving the Republican party to become an independent. Joe Malone is a frequent contributor for Fox 25 as a political analyst. To date, he is the last Republican to serve as Treasurer of Massachusetts.

== Biography ==
=== Early life and career ===
Malone was born in Newton, Massachusetts, and is the youngest of seven children of Italian immigrants. His mother worked in the administration of Governor John Volpe. He grew up in Waltham. He graduated from Waltham High School and attended Phillips Andover Academy as a post-graduate.

Malone graduated from Harvard University with a BA in government in 1978. Malone, a standout high school football star continued his success at Harvard by winning the Henry Lamar Award. The award is give to the athlete who demonstrates the spirit of cooperation.

=== Political career ===
After graduating from Harvard in 1978, Malone worked for the re-election campaign for Republican Senator Edward Brooke. In 1982 he coordinated Ray Shamie's U.S. Senate campaign against Democratic incumbent Ted Kennedy.

Malone unsuccessfully ran for U.S. Senate against incumbent Ted Kennedy in 1988.

==== Massachusetts Treasurer ====
Malone was elected Massachusetts Treasurer and Receiver-General in 1990 and was re-elected with almost 70% of the vote in 1994. He served from 1991 to 1999.

Joe reduced his operating budget by 62% during his 8-year tenure. Malone took pension fund performance from among the worst in the nation to the very best. Under Malone the Massachusetts State Lottery became the most efficient in the nation.

During Malone's tenure, at least $9.5 million was stolen from the treasury. Malone was never charged nor accused of wrongdoing; however, some of his aides were convicted and served jail time. In a February 2010 interview with the Boston Globe, Joe Malone stated that "he takes 'full responsibility' for what happened, and argued that the criminal behavior of certain aides should not overshadow his record." The thefts were undetected even by outside and government audits. "I was too trusting of people" Malone said. "I was not inclined to look at people and see the bad side."

==== Campaign for Governor ====
In 1998, Malone unsuccessfully challenged acting Governor Paul Cellucci for the Republican nomination for Governor.

=== After gubernatorial bid ===
Malone was Vice President of Business Development at Jenzabar, a provider of internet software solutions for colleges in Cambridge, Massachusetts. Internet software solutions currently serves more than 700 colleges and universities.

In December 2000 Malone, along with several other investors, opened the "C.P. Nuttings" steakhouse in Waltham, Massachusetts. The restaurant opened to great success, but like many other restaurant and tourism businesses, struggled in the recession that followed the 9/11 terrorist attacks. Several creditors and wealthy investors lost money in the venture.

Malone is a co-founder of the M/D Group, a business development firm in Scituate, Massachusetts. His co-founder in the venture is Joseph DiLorenzo, the CFO of Plymouth Rock Studios movie studio project in Plymouth, Massachusetts. Malone is now president of The Joe Malone Group, a business development consulting firm.

In March 2010, following Scott Brown's victory in the senate special election, Malone announced a run for the Republican nomination for Congress in Massachusetts's 10th congressional district, whose incumbent Bill Delahunt (D-MA) had announced he would not seek re-election. Other candidates for the Republican nomination were Bob Hayden, Raymond Kasperowicz and Jeff Perry, who won the primary.

Party political offices
Preceded by Ray Shamie	Republican nominee for U.S. Senator from Massachusetts (Class 1); 1988	Succeeded by Mitt Romney
Preceded by L. Joyce Hampers	Republican nominee for Treasurer and Receiver-General of Massachusetts; 1990, 1994	Succeeded by Robert Maginn
Political offices
Preceded by Robert Crane	Treasurer and Receiver-General of Massachusetts; January 3, 1991 – January 7, 1999	Succeeded by Shannon O'Brien
