= Robert B. Kennedy =

American politician

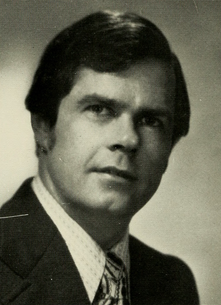

Member of the Massachusetts Governor's Council for the 3rd District
- In office 1989–1995
- Preceded by: Herb Connolly
- Succeeded by: Cynthia Stone Creem

Mayor of Lowell, Massachusetts
- In office 1986–1987
- Preceded by: Brian J. Martin
- Succeeded by: Richard P. Howe

Member of the Massachusetts House of Representatives from the 46th Middlesex District
- In office 1975–1979
- Preceded by: District created
- Succeeded by: District eliminated

Personal details
- Born: February 6, 1940 Lowell, Massachusetts
- Died: May 1, 2018 (aged 78) Lowell, Massachusetts
- Party: Democratic
- Education: Bentley College of Accounting and Finance; Lowell Technological Institute
- Occupation: politician

Robert B. Kennedy (February 6, 1940 – May 1, 2018) was an American politician from Lowell, Massachusetts.

== Early life ==
Kennedy was born in Lowell, Massachusetts. He attended Bentley College of Accounting and Finance and Lowell Technological Institute.

== Politics ==
From 1971 to 1975, Kennedy was a member of the Lowell City Council. In 1972 he ran for the United States House of Representatives in Massachusetts's 5th congressional district. He finished fifth in a ten candidate Democratic primary with 7.47%.

From 1975 to 1979, Kennedy was a member of the Massachusetts House of Representatives.

Kennedy served on the Lowell City Council again from 1981 to 1990. From 1986 to 1987 he also served as Lowell's mayor.

From 1989 to 1995, Kennedy represented the 3rd District on the Massachusetts Governor's Council.

== Death ==
He died on May 1, 2018, in Lowell, Massachusetts, at the age of 78.
