= 1966 Massachusetts elections =

1966 Massachusetts general election
- November 8, 1966

Part of the 1966 United States elections

The 1966 Massachusetts general election was held on November 8, 1966, throughout Massachusetts. Primary elections took place on September 13.

At the federal level, Republican Edward Brooke was elected to the United States Senate over Democrat Endicott Peabody and Democrats won seven of twelve seats in the United States House of Representatives. Former Speaker of the House Joseph W. Martin Jr. was the only incumbent not re-elected, after his defeat in the Republican primary against Margaret Heckler.

In the race for Governor, incumbent Republican governor John Volpe defeated Democratic challenger Edward J. McCormack Jr. Overall, Republicans won three of the six elected state-wide offices. Incumbents were re-elected in four races.

This was the first election in which the term of office for all state officers was extended from two to four years.

== Governor ==
Republican John A. Volpe was re-elected over Democrat Edward J. McCormack, Jr., Socialist Labor candidate Henning A. Blomen, and Prohibition candidate John C. Hedges.

== Lieutenant governor ==
1966 Massachusetts Lieutenant Governor election
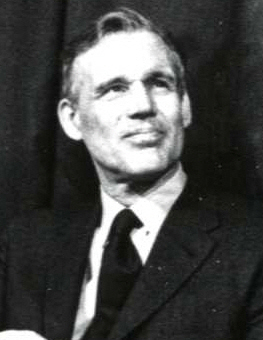

Nominee	Francis Sargent	Joseph E. McGuire
Party	Republican	Democratic
Popular vote	1,059,846	859,907
Percentage	54.6%	44.3%
Lieutenant Governor before election
Elliot Richardson
Republican
Elected Lieutenant Governor
Francis Sargent
Republican

Lt. Governor Elliott Richardson did not run for re-election. Republican Francis W. Sargent was elected Lieutenant Governor over Democrat Joseph E. McGuire.

=== Republican primary ===
==== Candidates ====
- Francis Sargent, Commissioner of Public Works

===== Declined =====
- Elliot Richardson, incumbent Lieutenant Governor (running for Attorney General)

==== Results ====
Francis Sargent was unopposed for the nomination.

=== Democratic primary ===
==== Candidates ====
- Herbert L. Connolly, auto dealer
- Joseph E. McGuire, attorney from Worcester

==== Results ====
1966 Massachusetts Democratic Lt. gubernatorial primary
Party	Candidate	Votes	%
Democratic	Joseph E. McGuire	307,560	54.82%
Democratic	Herbert L. Connolly	235,808	45.17%
Write-in		7	0.00%
Total votes		543,375	100.00%

=== General election ===
==== Results ====
Francis W. Sargent defeated Joseph E. McGuire by 199,939 votes. It was the last general election in which the Governor and Lt. Governor were elected separately.

1966 Massachusetts Lt. gubernatorial election
Party	Candidate	Votes	%	±%
Republican	Francis W. Sargent	1,059,846	54.58%	▲4.36
Democratic	Joseph E. McGuire	859,907	44.28%	▼4.83
Socialist Labor	Francis A. Votano	14,822	0.76%	▲0.33
Prohibition	Grace F. Luder	7,202	0.37%	▲0.13
Write-in		66	0.00%	
Total votes		1,941,843	100.00%	

== Attorney general ==
1966 Massachusetts Attorney General election
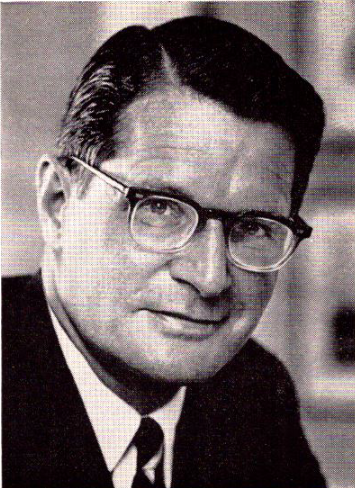

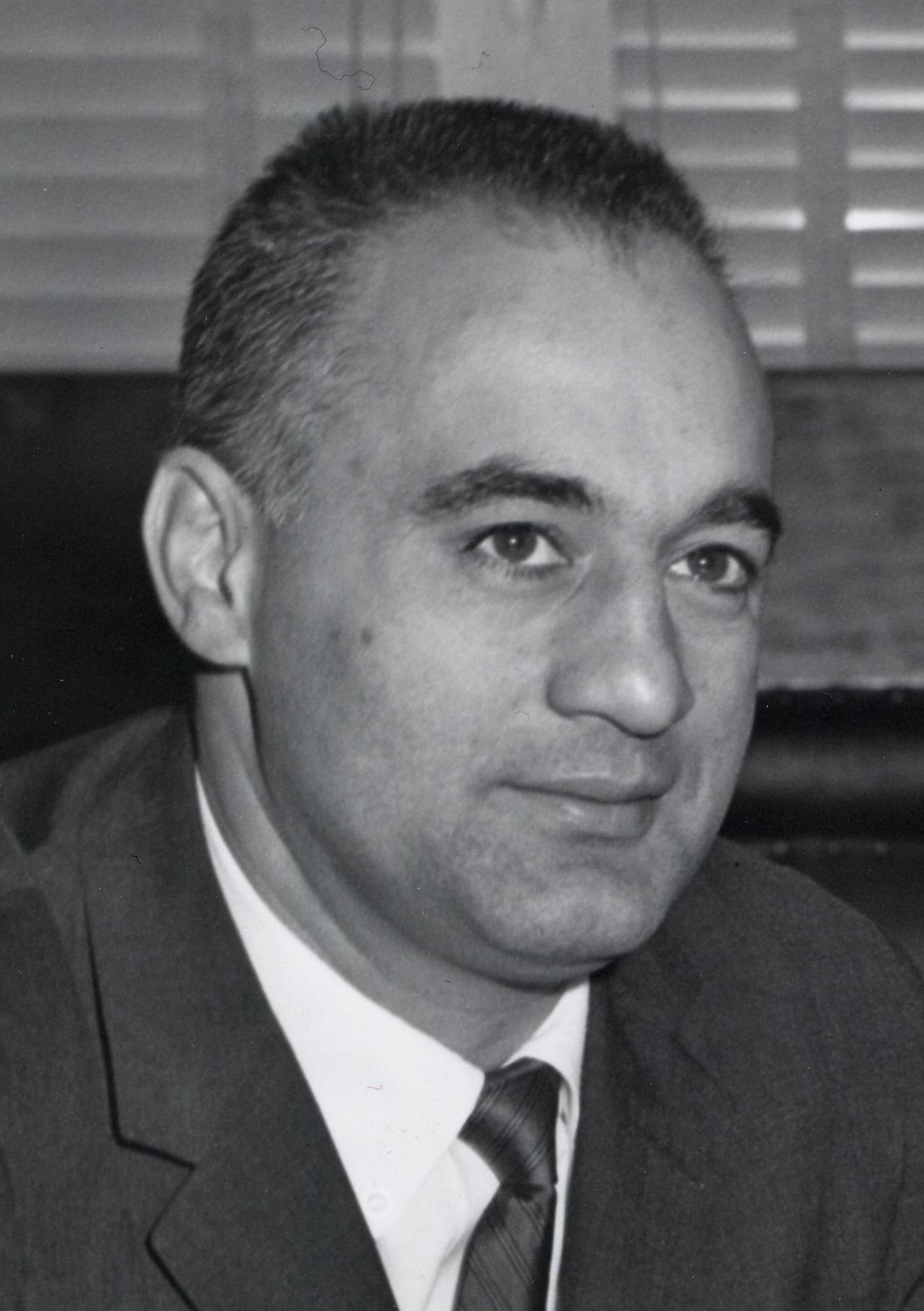
Nominee	Elliot Richardson	Francis Bellotti
Party	Republican	Democratic
Popular vote	1,036,739	946,219
Percentage	51.8%	47.3%
Attorney General before election
Edward Brooke
Republican
Elected Attorney General
Elliott Richardson
Republican

Incumbent Attorney General Edward Brooke did not run for re-election.

Republican Lt. Governor Elliot Richardson defeated former Democrat Lt. Governor Francis X. Bellotti to win the open race.

As of 2026, this is the last time a Republican was elected Attorney General of Massachusetts.

=== Democratic primary ===
==== Candidates ====
- Francis X. Bellotti, former Lieutenant Governor (1963–65) and nominee for Governor in 1964
- Robert DeGiacomo
- Foster Furcolo, former Governor (1957–61)

==== Results ====
Massachusetts Attorney General Democratic Primary, 1966
Party	Candidate	Votes	%
Democratic	Francis X. Bellotti	349,844	56.91%
Democratic	Foster Furcolo	146,137	23.77%
Democratic	Robert DeGiacomo	118,700	19.31%
Write-in		16	0.01%
Total votes		614,697	100.00%

=== General election ===
==== Results ====
1966 Massachusetts Attorney General election
Party	Candidate	Votes	%	±%
Republican	Elliot Richardson	1,036,739	51.84%	▼15.34
Democratic	Francis X. Bellotti	946,219	47.31%	▲14.83
Socialist Workers	Edgar E. Gaudet	16,901	0.85%	▲0.64
Write-in		48	0.00%	Steady
Total votes		1,999,907	100.00%	

== Secretary of the Commonwealth ==
1966 Massachusetts Secretary of the Commonwealth election
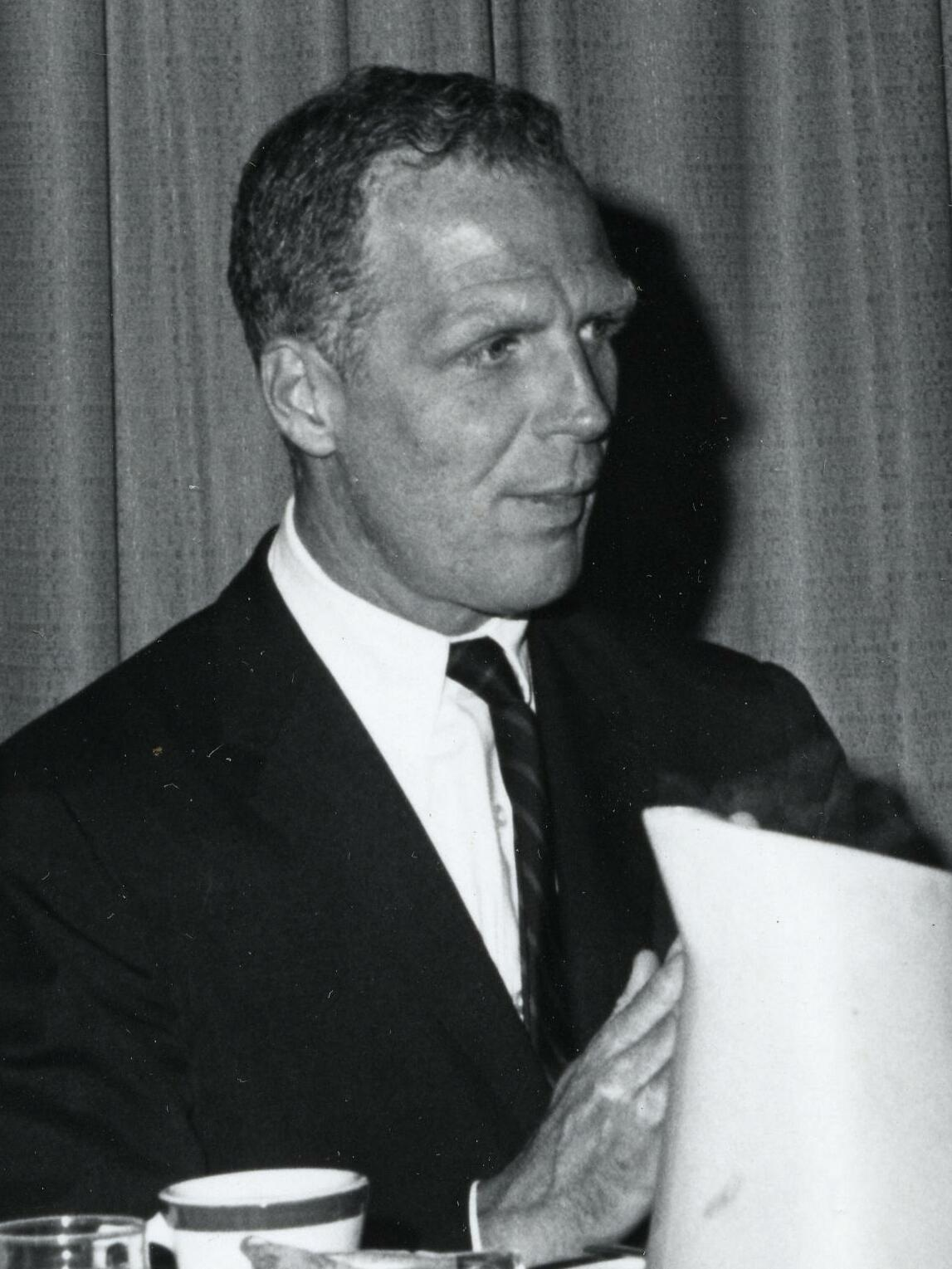

Nominee	Kevin White	Raymond Trudel
Party	Democratic	Republican
Popular vote	1,357,131	562,708
Percentage	70.0%	29.0%
Secretary of the Commonwealth before election
Kevin White
Democratic
Elected Secretary of the Commonwealth
Kevin White
Democratic

Incumbent Secretary of the Commonwealth Kevin White, defeated Republican Raymond Trudel, Socialist Labor candidate Willy N. Hogseth, and Prohibition candidate F. Oliver Drake in the general election.

=== General election ===
==== Results ====
Massachusetts Secretary of the Commonwealth Election, 1966
Party	Candidate	Votes	%	±%
Democratic	Kevin White (incumbent)	1,357,131	70.03%	▼1.17
Republican	Raymond Trudel	562,708	29.04%	▲0.89
Prohibition	F. Oliver Drake	9,289	0.48%	▲0.20
Socialist Workers	Willy N. Hogseth	8,625	0.45%	▲0.07
Write-in		4	0.00%	Steady
Total votes		1,937,757	100.00%	

== Treasurer and Receiver-General ==
1966 Massachusetts Treasurer election
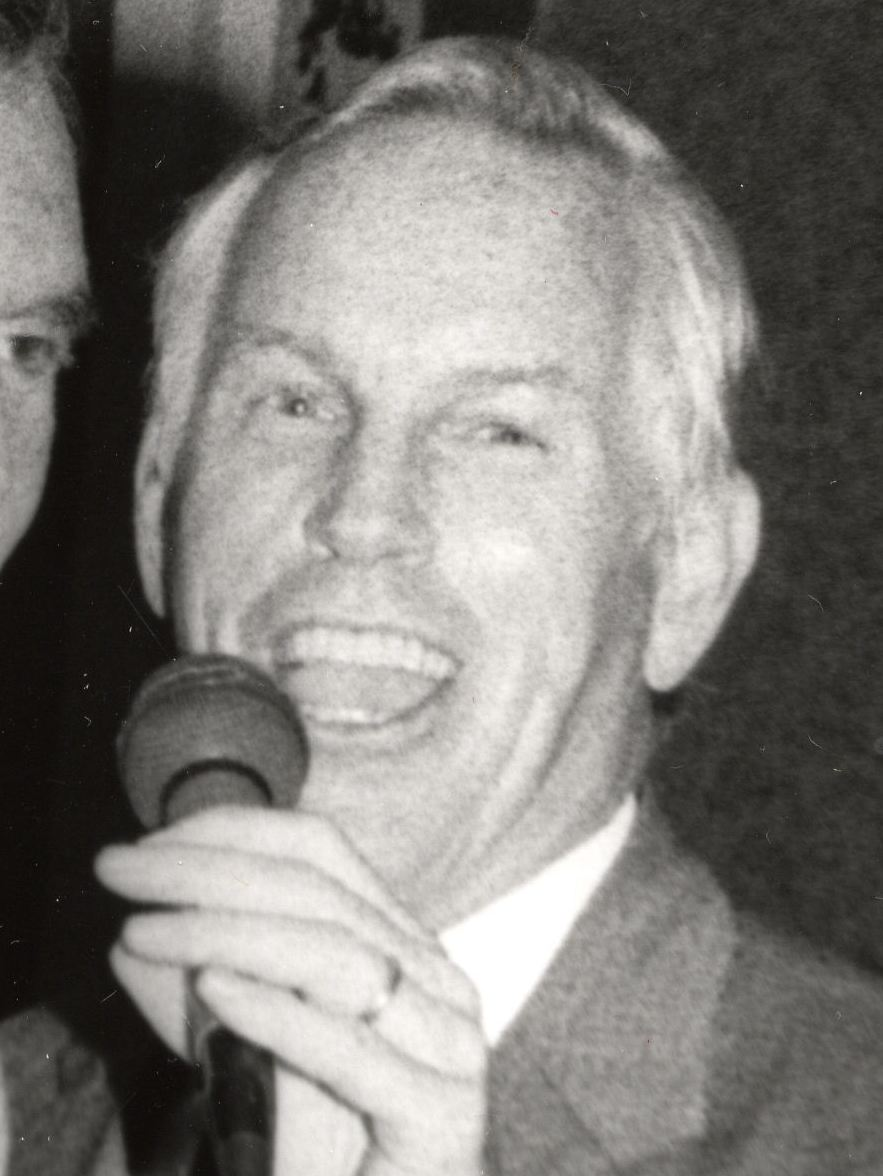

Nominee	Robert Q. Crane	Joseph Fernandes
Party	Democratic	Republican
Popular vote	1,197,981	689,367
Percentage	62.5%	36.0%
Treasurer and Receiver-General before election
Robert Q. Crane
Democratic
Elected Treasurer and Receiver-General
Robert Q. Crane
Democratic

Incumbent Treasurer and Receiver-General Robert Q. Crane defeated Republican Joseph Fernandes, Socialist Labor candidate Domenico DiGirolamo, and Prohibition candidate Julia Kohler in the general election.

=== General election ===
==== Results ====
Massachusetts Treasurer and Receiver-General Election, 1966
Party	Candidate	Votes	%	±%
Democratic	Robert Q. Crane (incumbent)	1,197,981	62.55%	▼1.59
Republican	Joseph Fernandes	689,367	35.99%	▲0.71
Socialist Workers	Domenico DiGirolamo	18,819	0.98%	▲0.61
Prohibition	Julia Kohler	9,203	0.48%	▲0.19
Write-in		27	0.00%	Steady
Total votes		1,915,397	100.00%	

== Auditor ==
1966 Massachusetts Auditor election
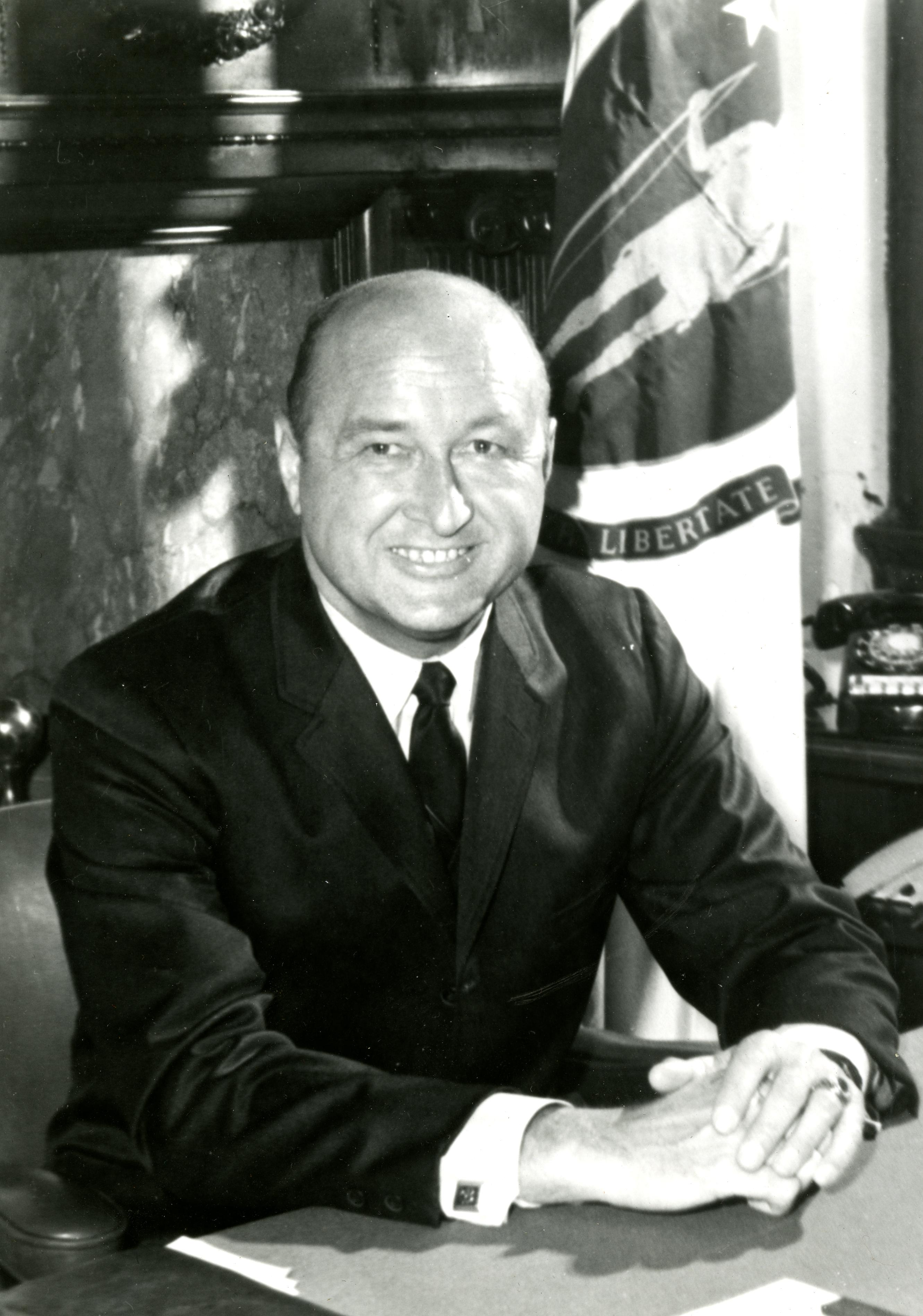

Nominee	Thaddeus Buczko	John J. Buckley
Party	Democratic	Republican
Popular vote	1,102,844	808,584
Percentage	57.1%	41.5%
Auditor before election
Thaddeus M. Buczko
Democratic
Elected Auditor
Thaddeus M. Buczko
Democratic

Incumbent Auditor Thaddeus M. Buczko defeated state representative James H. Kelly in the Democratic primary.

In the general election, Buczko defeated Republican John J. Buckley, Socialist Labor candidate August Johnson, and Prohibition candidate Roger I. Williams in the general election.

=== Democratic primary ===
==== Candidates ====
- Thaddeus M. Buczko, incumbent Auditor
- James H. Kelly, State Representative

==== Results ====
1966 Democratic Massachusetts Auditor primary
Party	Candidate	Votes	%
Democratic	Thaddeus M. Buczko (incumbent)	336,187	60.25%
Democratic	James H. Kelly	221,805	39.75%
Write-in		7	0.00%
Total votes		557,999	100.00%

=== General election ===
==== Results ====
1966 Massachusetts Auditor election
Party	Candidate	Votes	%	±%
Democratic	Thaddeus M. Buczko (incumbent)	1,102,844	57.08%	▼1.30
Republican	John J. Buckley	808,584	41.85%	▲1.19
Socialist Workers	August Johnson	12,479	0.65%	▲0.22
Prohibition	Roger I. Williams	8,196	0.42%	▼0.11
Write-in		4	0.00%	Steady
Total votes		1,932,107	100.00%	

== United States Senate ==
Republican Edward Brooke was elected over Democrat Endicott Peabody, Socialist Labor candidate Lawrence Gilfedder, and Prohibition candidate Mark R. Shaw.

== See also ==
- 165th Massachusetts General Court (1967–1968)
