= Chester G. Atkins =

American politician

Chester Atkins
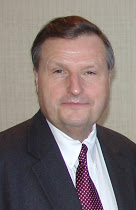
- Atkins in 2000

Member of the U.S. House of Representatives from Massachusetts's 5th district
- In office January 3, 1985 – January 3, 1993
- Preceded by: James Shannon
- Succeeded by: Marty Meehan

Personal details
- Born: Chester Greenough Atkins; April 14, 1948 (age 78) Geneva, Switzerland
- Party: Democratic
- Education: Antioch College (BA)

Chester Greenough Atkins (born April 14, 1948) is an American politician and former United States representative from Massachusetts. A member of the Democratic Party, he represented Massachusetts's 5th congressional district from 1985 to 1993, serving four terms in the United States House of Representatives.

== Early life and education ==
Born in Geneva, Switzerland in 1948, he graduated from Concord-Carlisle High School in 1966 and Antioch College in 1970.

== Political career ==
=== Massachusetts state legislature ===
Atkins began his political career in the Massachusetts House of Representatives where he served from 1970 to 1971 and later served in the Massachusetts Senate from 1972 to 1984.

During his tenure in the Massachusetts Senate, Atkins served as chairman of the Massachusetts Democratic State Committee from 1977 to 1990.

=== Congress ===
Atkins ran for the Democratic nomination in Massachusetts's 5th congressional district in 1984 after incumbent James Shannon vacated the seat to run for the U.S. Senate. Atkins defeated Philip L. Shea in the Democratic primary with 52.9% of the vote. He then defeated Republican nominee Gregory S. Hyatt in the general election, receiving 53.4% of the vote.

Following congressional redistricting, Atkins was challenged by Marty Meehan, a former Middlesex County prosecutor, in the 1992 Democratic primary. Meehan defeated Atkins, receiving 65.1% of the vote to Atkins's 34.8%, ending Atkins's congressional career after four terms.

== Later career and personal life ==
After leaving Congress, Atkins worked in government relations and became a founding partner of Tremont Strategies Group, a government relations firm. He has also served on the boards of several public and private organizations, including U.S. Trust Company, Walden Asset Management, and GrainPro, as well as nonprofit organizations including Oxfam America, Amnesty International, Emerson Hospital, the Greater Lowell Community Foundation, and Earthwatch Institute.

Atkins has also worked as an international election observer and legislative trainer in emerging democracies, including Cambodia, Yemen, Albania, Georgia, Peru, and Guatemala.

Atkins is a member of the ReFormers Caucus of Issue One.

As of 2022, Atkins resides in Hancock, New Hampshire with his wife Jessica Stern.

== See also ==
- 1973–1974 Massachusetts legislature
- 1977–1978 Massachusetts legislature
- Massachusetts Senate's Middlesex and Worcester district

U.S. House of Representatives
Preceded by James Shannon	Member of the U.S. House of Representatives from Massachusetts's 5th congressional district 1985–1993	Succeeded by Marty Meehan
U.S. order of precedence (ceremonial)
Preceded by Bruce Morrison as Former U.S. Representative	Order of precedence of the United States as Former U.S. Representative	Succeeded by Joe Kennedy III as Former U.S. Representative
