= 1988 United States Senate election in Massachusetts =

- November 8, 1988
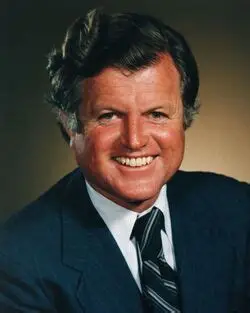

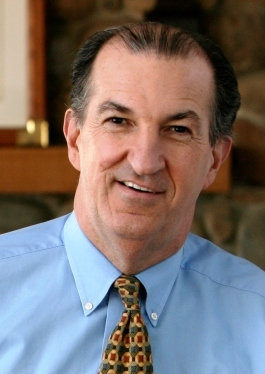
Nominee	Ted Kennedy	Joe Malone
Party	Democratic	Republican
Popular vote	1,693,344	884,267
Percentage	64.97%	33.93%
- Kennedy: 50–60% 60–70% 70–80% 80–90% >90% Malone: 40–50% 50–60% Tie: 40–50%
U.S. senator before election
Ted Kennedy
Democratic
Elected U.S. Senator
Ted Kennedy
Democratic

The 1988 United States Senate election in Massachusetts was held on November 8, 1988. Incumbent Democratic U.S. Senator Ted Kennedy won re-election to his sixth (his fifth full) term.

== General election ==
=== Candidates ===
- Mary Fridley (New Alliance)
- Ted Kennedy, incumbent U.S. Senator since 1962 (Democratic)
- Joe Malone, political activist (Republican)
- Freda Lee Nason (Libertarian)

=== Results ===
1988 United States Senate election in Massachusetts
Party	Candidate	Votes	%	±%
Democratic	Ted Kennedy (incumbent)	1,693,344	64.97%	▲4.16
Republican	Joe Malone	884,267	33.93%	▼4.33
New Alliance	Mary Fridley	15,208	0.58%	N/A
Libertarian	Freda Lee Nason	13,199	0.51%	▼0.41
Write-in		207	0.01	+0
Total votes		2,606,225	100.00%	
Democratic hold				

== See also ==
- 1988 United States Senate elections
