= Electoral history of John F. Kennedy =

List of elections featuring John F. Kennedy as a candidate

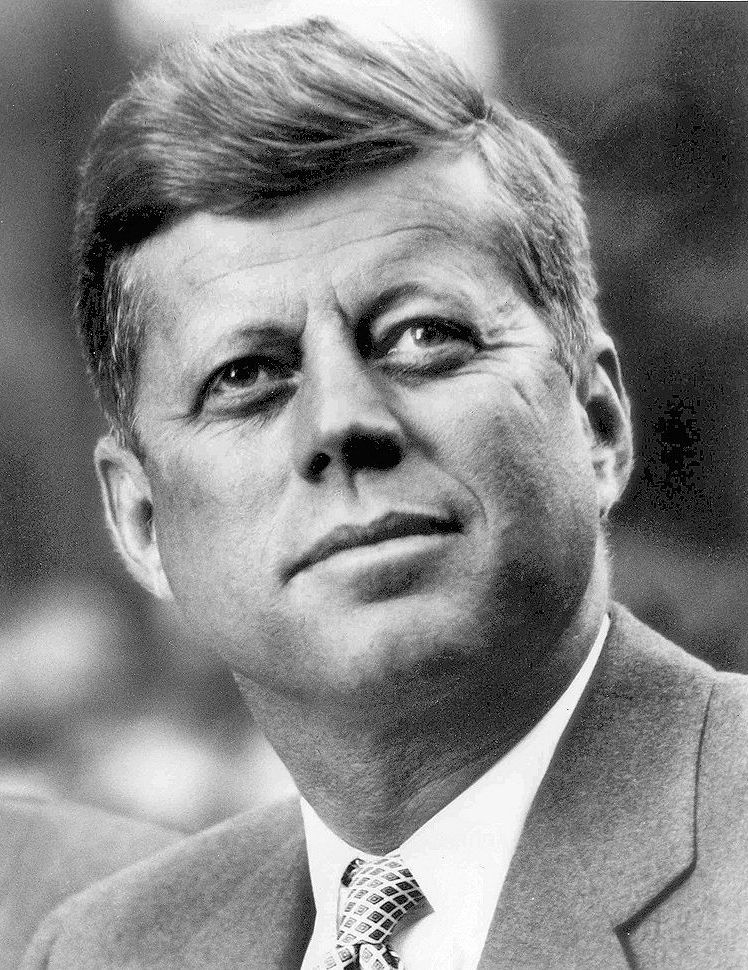
President John F. Kennedy

This page is for the electoral history of John F. Kennedy, who served as the 35th president of the United States (1961–1963), as well as a United States senator (1953–1960) and United States representative (1947–1953) from Massachusetts.

== U.S. House of Representatives elections (1946–1950) ==
1946 Massachusetts's 11th congressional district election, Democratic primary
| Party | Candidate | Votes | % |
|---|---|---|---|
| Democratic | John F. Kennedy | 22,183 | 42.41% |
| Democratic | Michael J. Neville | 11,341 | 21.68% |
| Democratic | John F. Cotter | 6,677 | 12.76% |
| Democratic | Joseph Russo | 5,661 | 10.82% |
| Democratic | Catherine E. Falvey | 2,446 | 4.68% |
| Democratic | Joseph Lee | 1,848 | 3.53% |
| Democratic | Joseph Russo | 799 | 1.53% |
| Democratic | Michael DeLuca | 536 | 1.03% |
| Democratic | Francis N. Rooney | 521 | 1.00% |
| Democratic | Robert B. DiFruscio | 298 | 0.57% |
| Total votes | | 52,310 | 100.00% |

1946 Massachusetts's 11th congressional district election
| Party | Candidate | Votes | % |
|---|---|---|---|
| Democratic | John F. Kennedy | 69,093 | 71.87% |
| Republican | Lester Bowen | 26,007 | 27.05% |
| Prohibition | Philip Geer | 1,036 | 1.08% |
| Total votes | | 96,136 | 100.00% |
| Democratic hold | | | |

1948 Massachusetts's 11th congressional district election
| Party | Candidate | Votes | % |
|---|---|---|---|
| Democratic | John F. Kennedy (incumbent) | 106,366 | 100.00% |
| Total votes | | 106,366 | 100.00% |
| Democratic hold | | | |

1950 Massachusetts's 11th congressional district election
| Party | Candidate | Votes | % |
|---|---|---|---|
| Democratic | John F. Kennedy (incumbent) | 87,699 | 82.28% |
| Republican | Vincent J. Celeste | 18,302 | 17.17% |
| Prohibition | Martha E. Geer | 582 | 0.55% |
| Total votes | | 106,583 | 100.00% |
| Democratic hold | | | |

== U.S. Senate elections (1952–1958) ==
1952 United States Senate election in Massachusetts
| Party | Candidate | Votes | % |
|---|---|---|---|
| Democratic | John F. Kennedy | 1,211,984 | 51.35% |
| Republican | Henry Cabot Lodge Jr. (incumbent) | 1,141,247 | 48.35% |
| Socialist Labor | Thelma Ingersoll | 4,683 | 0.20% |
| Prohibition | Mark R. Shaw | 2,508 | 0.11% |
| Total votes | | 2,360,422 | 100.00% |
| Democratic gain from Republican | | | |

1958 United States Senate election in Massachusetts
| Party | Candidate | Votes | % |
|---|---|---|---|
| Democratic | John F. Kennedy (incumbent) | 1,362,926 | 73.20% |
| Republican | Vincent J. Celeste | 488,318 | 26.23% |
| Socialist Labor | Lawrence Gilfedder | 5,457 | 0.29% |
| Prohibition | Mark R. Shaw | 5,335 | 0.29% |
| Total votes | | 1,862,036 | 100.00% |
| Democratic hold | | | |

== Presidential elections (1956–1960) ==
1956 Democratic presidential primaries
| Candidate | Votes | % |
|---|---|---|
| Adlai Stevenson II | 3,069,504 | 50.70% |
| Estes Kefauver | 2,283,172 | 37.71% |
| Unpledged delegates | 380,300 | 6.28% |
| Frank J. Lausche | 278,074 | 4.59% |
| John W. McCormack | 26,128 | 0.43% |
| Dwight D. Eisenhower | 6,358 | 0.11% |
| W. Averell Harriman | 3,368 | 0.06% |
| Robert Meyner | 1,129 | 0.02% |
| John F. Kennedy | 949 | 0.02% |
| Harry S. Truman | 728 | 0.01% |
| Stuart Symington | 402 | 0.01% |
| Others | 3,819 | 0.06% |
| Total votes | 6,053,931 | 100.00% |

1956 Democratic National Convention, Vice Presidential tally
| Candidates | First ballot | Second ballot | Third ballot |
|---|---|---|---|
| Estes Kefauver | 466.5 | 551.5 | 755.5 |
| John F. Kennedy | 294.5 | 618 | 589 |
| Albert Gore Sr. | 178 | 110.5 | 13.5 |
| Robert F. Wagner Jr. | 162.5 | 9.5 | 6 |
| Hubert Humphrey | 134 | 74.5 | 2 |
| Luther Hodges | 40 | 0.5 | |
| P. T. Maner | 33 | | |
| LeRoy Collins | 29 | | |
| Clinton Anderson | 16 | | |
| Frank G. Clement | 14 | | |
| Pat Brown | 1 | | |
| Lyndon B. Johnson | 1 | | |
| Stuart Symington | 1 | | |
| Total | 1,370.5 | 1,364.5 | 1,366 |
| Votes needed | 685 | 682 | 683 |

1960 Democratic primaries results John F. Kennedy Lyndon B. Johnson Hubert H. Humphrey Various (Note: Favorite sons received the support of Missouri (Stuart Symington), Florida (George Smathers), New Jersey (Robert Meyner), Mississippi (Carroll Gartin), and Hawaii.)

1960 Democratic presidential primaries
| Candidate | Votes | % |
|---|---|---|
| John F. Kennedy | 1,847,259 | 31.43% |
| Pat Brown | 1,354,031 | 23.04% |
| George H. McLain | 646,387 | 11.00% |
| Hubert Humphrey | 590,410 | 10.05% |
| George Smathers | 322,235 | 5.48% |
| Michael DiSalle | 315,312 | 5.37% |
| Unpledged delegates | 241,958 | 4.12% |
| Albert S. Potter | 208,057 | 3.54% |
| Wayne Morse | 147,262 | 2.51% |
| Adlai Stevenson II | 51,833 | 0.88% |
| Total votes | 5,724,744 | 100.00% |

1960 Democratic National Convention, Presidential tally
| Candidate | Votes | % |
|---|---|---|
| John F. Kennedy | 806 | 52.89% |
| Lyndon B. Johnson | 409 | 26.84% |
| Stuart Symington | 86 | 5.64% |
| Adlai Stevenson II | 80 | 5.25% |
| Robert Meyner | 43 | 2.82% |
| Hubert Humphrey | 42 | 2.76% |
| George Smathers | 30 | 1.97% |
| Ross Barnett | 23 | 1.51% |
| Herschel C. Loveless | 2 | 0.13% |
| Pat Brown | 1 | 0.07% |
| Orval E. Faubus | 1 | 0.07% |
| Albert Rosellini | 1 | 0.07% |
| Total votes | 1,524 | 100.00% |
| Votes necessary | 762 | 50.00% |

Results of the 1960 presidential election

1960 United States presidential election:

- John F. Kennedy/Lyndon B. Johnson (D) – 34,220,984 (49.7%) and 303 electoral votes (22 states carried)
- Richard Nixon/Henry Cabot Lodge Jr. (R) – 34,108,157 (49.5%) and 219 electoral votes (26 states carried)
- Harry F. Byrd/Strom Thurmond (I) – 286,359 (0.4%) and 14 electoral votes (2 states carried)
- Harry F. Byrd/Barry Goldwater (I) – 1 electoral vote (Oklahoma faithless elector)
- Orval E. Faubus/James G. Crommelin (States' Rights) – 44,984 (0.1%)

Electoral results
| Presidential candidate | Party | Home state | Popular vote | | Electoral vote | Running mate | | |
| Presidential candidate | Party | Home state | Count | Percentage | Electoral vote | Vice-presidential candidate | Home state | Electoral vote |
|---|---|---|---|---|---|---|---|---|
| John F. Kennedy | Democratic | Massachusetts | 34,220,984^{(a)} | 49.72% | 303 | Lyndon B. Johnson | Texas | 303 |
| Richard Nixon | Republican | California | 34,108,157 | 49.55% | 219 | Henry Cabot Lodge Jr. | Massachusetts | 219 |
| Harry F. Byrd | Southern Democratic | Virginia | —^{(b)} | —^{(b)} | 15 | James Strom Thurmond | South Carolina | 14 |
| Harry F. Byrd | Southern Democratic | Virginia | —^{(b)} | —^{(b)} | 15 | Barry Morris Goldwater^{(c)} | Arizona | 1^{(c)} |
| (unpledged electors) | Democratic | (n/a) | 610,409 | 0.42% | —^{(d)} | (n/a) | (n/a) | —^{(d)} |
| Eric Hass | Socialist Labor | New York | 47,522 | 0.07% | 0 | Georgia Cozzini | Wisconsin | 0 |
| Rutherford L. Decker | Prohibition | Missouri | 46,203 | 0.07% | 0 | E. Harold Munn | Michigan | 0 |
| Orval Faubus | States' Rights | Arkansas | 44,984 | 0.07% | 0 | John G. Crommelin | Alabama | 0 |
| Farrell Dobbs | Socialist Workers | New York | 40,175 | 0.06% | 0 | Myra Tanner Weiss | New York | 0 |
| Charles Sullivan | Constitution | Mississippi | (TX) 18,162 | 0.03% | 0 | Merritt Curtis | California | 0 |
| J. Bracken Lee | Conservative | Utah | (NJ) 8,708 | 0.01% | 0 | Kent Courtney | Louisiana | 0 |
| Other | | | 11,128 | 0.02% | — | Other | | — |
| Total | | | 68,832,482 | 100% | 537 | | | 537 |
| Needed to win | | | | | 269 | | | 269 |
