= Ray Shamie =

American politician and businessman

Chair of the Massachusetts Republican Party
- In office 1987–1990
- Preceded by: Andrew Natsios
- Succeeded by: Leon Lombardi

Personal details
- Born: Raymond Shamie; June 7, 1921 Brooklyn, New York, U.S.
- Died: October 16, 1999 (aged 78) Florida, U.S.
- Party: Republican

Raymond Shamie (June 7, 1921 – October 16, 1999) was an American politician and businessman from Massachusetts. Shamie served as the chair of the Massachusetts Republican Party and was twice the Republican nominee for the United States Senate.

== Early life and education ==
Shamie was born in Brooklyn, New York. His father died in a traffic accident while Shamie was in high school, and in 1937, during the Great Depression, Shamie got a job as a busboy a Horn & Hardart automat.

== Career ==
Shamie was twice a Massachusetts Republican nominee for the United States Senate, and served as the chairman of the Massachusetts Republican Party from 1987 to 1991.

Ray Shamie was the inventor of the "Metal Bellows", a flexible shaft coupling that is used in aerospace and many other fields, for which he held the patent.

In 1982, Shamie, a millionaire businessman and metalwork entrepreneur (primarily from the invention of Metal Bellows), challenged longtime incumbent Senator Ted Kennedy. In a Democratic-leaning election cycle, Shamie lost in a landslide, receiving 38 percent of the vote against Kennedy's 61 percent. In 1984, he announced that he would challenge Senator Paul Tsongas for re-election; however, Tsongas, who had been diagnosed with lymphoma, did not run for re-election. Shamie won the Republican primary for the seat, beating former U.S. Attorney General Elliot Richardson. In the general election, he faced off against Massachusetts Lieutenant Governor John Kerry. Shamie lost the Senate race to Kerry, 55–45.

After his second bid for the Senate, he became the chairman of the Massachusetts Republican Party. He served in that capacity until 1991. He is credited with helping Republican William Weld win the governorship in 1990.

== Death ==
Shamie died in Florida on October 16, 1999, at the age of 78.

Party political offices
Preceded by Michael Robertson	Republican nominee for U.S. Senator from Massachusetts (Class 1); 1982	Succeeded by Joe Malone
Preceded by Edward Brooke	Republican nominee for U.S. Senator from Massachusetts (Class 2); 1984	Succeeded by Jim Rappaport
Preceded by Andrew Natsios	Chair of the Massachusetts Republican Party; 1987–1990	Succeeded by Leon Lombardi
