= Bombing of Cambodia =

Bombing of Cambodia may refer to:

- Operation Menu (1969–1970)
- Operation Freedom Deal (1970–1973)
