= William G. Robinson =

American politician

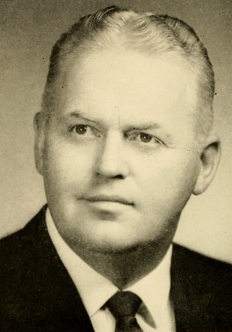

Minority Leader of the Massachusetts House of Representatives
- In office 1979–1987
- Preceded by: Francis W. Hatch Jr.
- Succeeded by: Steven Pierce

Member of the Massachusetts House of Representatives
- In office 1965–1987
- Preceded by: Theodore Vaitses
- Succeeded by: Timothy O'Leary

Personal details
- Born: March 10, 1926 Boston, Massachusetts
- Died: December 19, 2011 (aged 85) Melrose, Massachusetts
- Party: Republican
- Spouse: Eleanor (Vittorini) Robinson
- Children: 2
- Occupation: Storeowner; Relator; Politician

William George "Bill" Robinson was an American politician who served in the Massachusetts House of Representatives.

== Early life ==
Robinson was born on March 10, 1926, in Boston to George and Muriel (Bumstead) Robinson. He grew up in Boston and Malden.

Robinson owned Middlesex Furnace Co. in Malden for 12 years and later owned Robinson Real Estate Co. As well as a Hardware store, and two Laundromats in Malden and Melrose. He later moved to Melrose, where he resided for 48 years.

== Political career ==
From 1965 to 1987, Robinson was a member of the Massachusetts House of Representatives. He was the Assistant Minority Whip from 1971 to 1973,(Republican) Minority Whip from 1973 to 1977, Assistant Minority Leader from 1977 to 1979, and Minority Leader from 1979 to 1987. During his tenure in the House, Robinson was a leader in getting the state's Lemon Law (first in the nation)and also the contract cancelation law whereby a person may cancel any contract with a value in excess of $500.00 within 72 hours of signing such contract, he also passed the Measles Vaccine Law for Children, and initiated and helped pass the requirement for sprinkler systems to be installed in all buildings (new construction) with more than 2 stories, and also in buildings where significant restoration or remodeling occurs.

In 1982, Robinson was a candidate for Governor of Massachusetts. He dropped out of the race after he lost at the Republican convention. Robinson instead chose to run for-election in the House. In 1986 he ran for Massachusetts State Auditor. He defeated Andrew Natsios in the Republican primary 55% to 45%, but lost to A. Joseph DeNucci in the general election 63% to 37%.

== Personal life and death ==
Robinson was married to Eleanor (Vittorini) Robinson for 65 years. They had two children.

Robinson died on December 19, 2011, at Melrose-Wakefield Hospital.

Party political offices
| Preceded by Michael S. Robertson | Republican nominee for Auditor of Massachusetts; 1986 | Succeeded by Douglas J. Murray |
