= James Shannon (Massachusetts politician) =

American politician (born 1952)

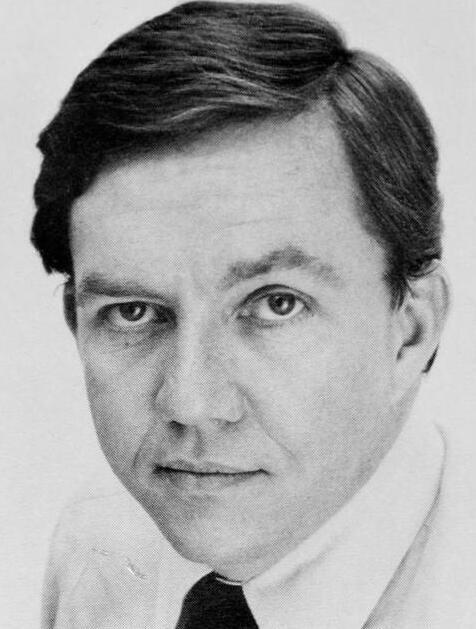

40th Attorney General of Massachusetts
- In office January 3, 1987 – January 3, 1991
- Governor: Michael Dukakis
- Preceded by: Francis Bellotti
- Succeeded by: Scott Harshbarger

Member of the U.S. House of Representatives from Massachusetts's 5th district
- In office January 3, 1979 – January 3, 1985
- Preceded by: Paul Tsongas
- Succeeded by: Chester G. Atkins

Personal details
- Born: James Michael Shannon; April 4, 1952 (age 74) Methuen, Massachusetts, U.S.
- Party: Democratic
- Education: Johns Hopkins University (BA); George Washington University (JD)

James Michael Shannon (born April 4, 1952) is an American Democratic politician from Massachusetts. He served in the U.S. House of Representatives from 1979 to 1985, and later as the Massachusetts attorney general.

== Biography ==
Shannon was born on April 4, 1952, in Methuen, Massachusetts, and grew up in Lawrence. He graduated from Phillips Academy in 1969 and received his B.A. in political science from Johns Hopkins University in 1973. He earned a J.D. degree at George Washington University Law School in 1975 and practiced law in Lawrence.

In 1970 and 1971, Shannon was an intern in the office of Congressman F. Bradford Morse. From 1973 to 1975 he served on the staff of Congressman Michael J. Harrington. In 1976 he ran for the Massachusetts State Senate, losing the Democratic primary to incumbent William X. Wall by only eight votes.

He was elected to the U.S. House of Representatives in 1978, succeeding Paul E. Tsongas, who ran successfully for the United States Senate. Shannon was reelected in 1980 and 1982.

In 1981, he was selected to be one of the first Young Leaders of the French-American Foundation.

When Senator Tsongas announced his retirement in 1984, Shannon entered the race to succeed him. He was defeated in the Democratic primary by Lieutenant Governor John Kerry, who went on to win the seat. Shannon served out the rest of his term in the House, leaving office in January 1985, at which point he was elected to the Common Cause National Governing Board.

In 1986, he was elected attorney general of Massachusetts, defeating Edward F. Harrington and serving from 1987 to 1991. He was defeated for re-election in 1990 by Scott Harshbarger in the Democratic primary.

In 2000, Shannon led Bill Bradley's presidential campaign in Massachusetts and was a Bradley delegate to Democratic National Convention.

He was elected president and chief executive officer of the NFPA (National Fire Protection Association) in 2002, and served until 2014.

He became president of the International Electrotechnical Commission on January 1, 2017, for a three-year term.

U.S. House of Representatives
Preceded by Paul Tsongas	Member of the U.S. House of Representatives from Massachusetts's 5th congressional district 1979-1985	Succeeded by Chester G. Atkins
Party political offices
Preceded by Francis Bellotti	Democratic nominee for Attorney General of Massachusetts; 1986	Succeeded by Scott Harshbarger
Legal offices
Preceded by Francis X. Bellotti	Attorney General of Massachusetts; 1987–1991	Succeeded by Scott Harshbarger
U.S. order of precedence (ceremonial)
Preceded by Elizabeth Esty as Former U.S. Representative	Order of precedence of the United States as Former U.S. Representative	Succeeded by Charles Thomas McMillen as Former U.S. Representative
