= 1982 United States Senate election in Massachusetts =

- November 2, 1982
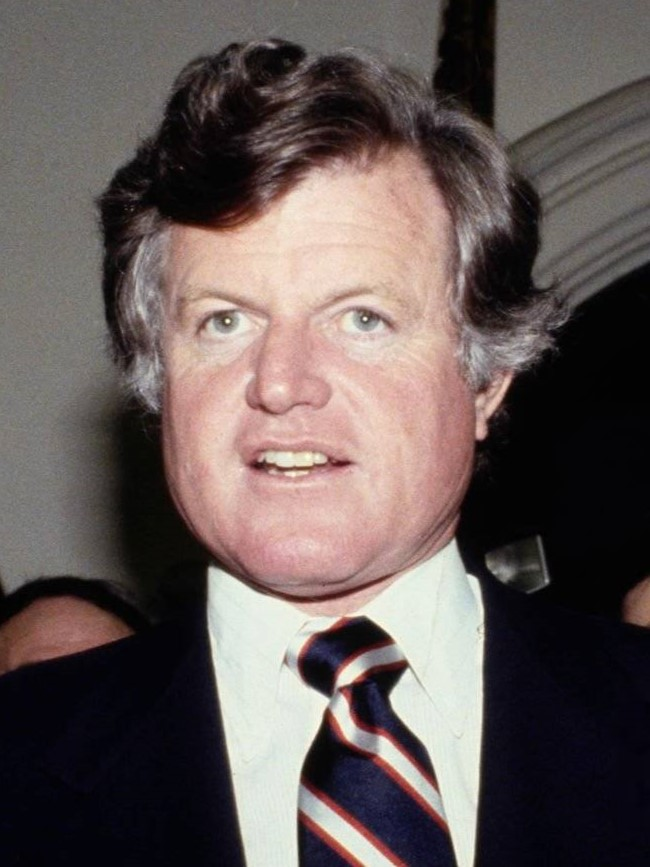

Nominee	Ted Kennedy	Ray Shamie
Party	Democratic	Republican
Popular vote	1,247,084	784,602
Percentage	60.81%	38.26%
- Kennedy: 40–50% 50–60% 60–70% 70–80% 80–90% >90% Shamie: 40–50% 50–60% 60–70% 70–80%
U.S. senator before election
Ted Kennedy
Democratic
Elected U.S. Senator
Ted Kennedy
Democratic

The 1982 United States Senate election in Massachusetts was held on November 2, 1982. Incumbent Democratic U.S. Senator Ted Kennedy won re-election to his fifth (his fourth full) term.

== General election ==
=== Candidates ===
- Howard S. Katz (Libertarian)
- Ted Kennedy, incumbent U.S. senator since 1962 (Democratic)
- Ray Shamie, metalwork entrepreneur (Republican)

=== Results ===
General election
Party	Candidate	Votes	%	±%
Democratic	Ted Kennedy (incumbent)	1,247,084	60.81	−8.50
Republican	Ray Shamie	784,602	38.26	+9.25
Libertarian	Howard S. Katz	18,878	0.92	+0.92
	All others	205	0.01	+0.00
Total votes		2,050,769	70.26%	
Democratic hold				

== See also ==
- 1982 United States Senate elections
