= Francis Bellotti =

American lawyer and politician (1923–2024)

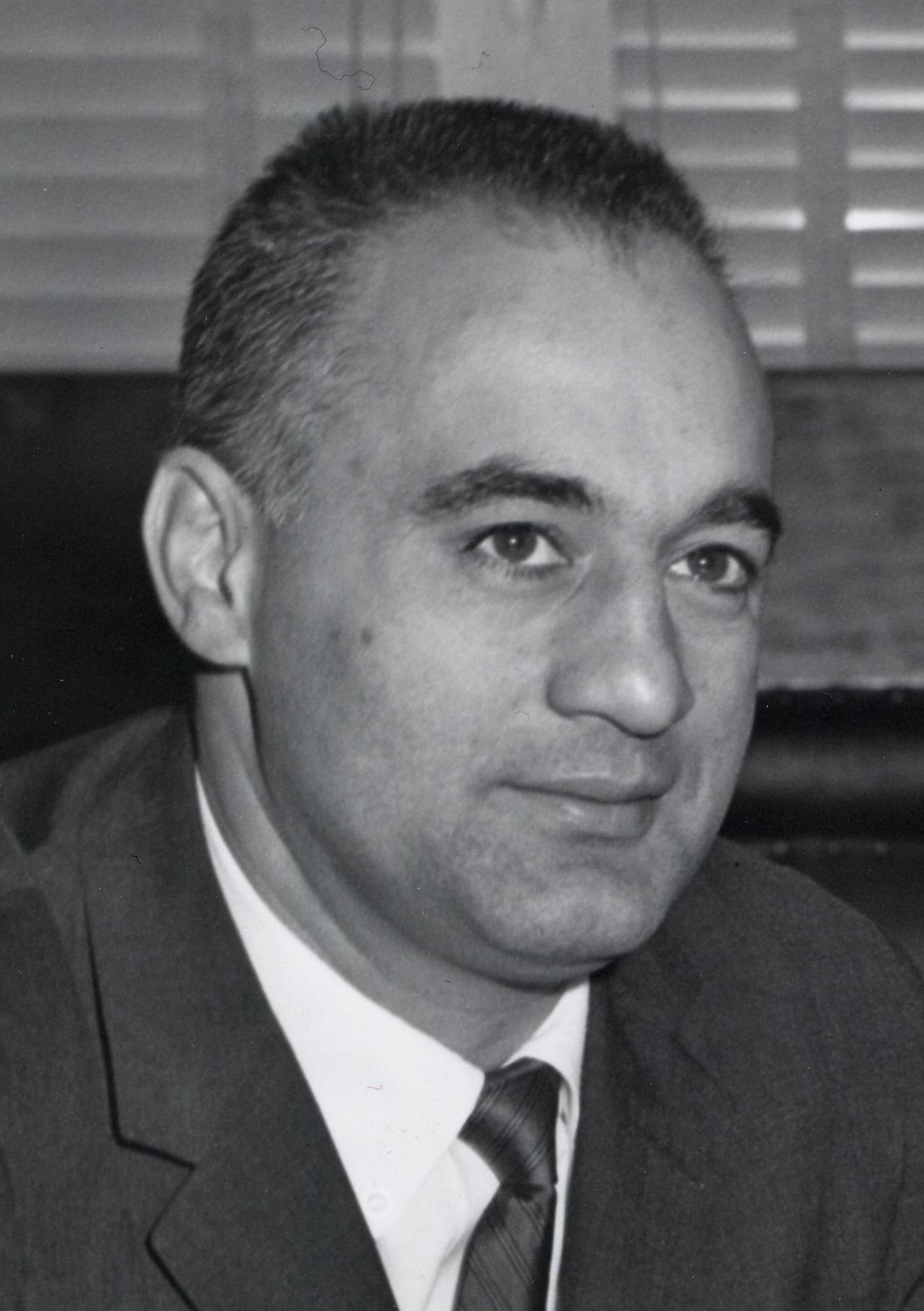
- Bellotti in 1962

39th Attorney General of Massachusetts
- In office January 2, 1975 – January 3, 1987
- Governor: Michael Dukakis; Edward J. King
- Preceded by: Robert H. Quinn
- Succeeded by: James Shannon

61st Lieutenant Governor of Massachusetts
- In office January 3, 1963 – January 7, 1965
- Governor: Endicott Peabody
- Preceded by: Edward F. McLaughlin Jr.
- Succeeded by: Elliot Richardson

Personal details
- Born: Francis Xavier Bellotti; May 3, 1923 Boston, Massachusetts, U.S.
- Died: December 17, 2024 (aged 101) Hingham, Massachusetts, U.S.
- Party: Democratic
- Spouse: Margarita E. Wang (m. 1949; died 2022)
- Children: 12, including Michael G.
- Education: Tufts University (BA); Boston College (JD)

Military service
- Branch/service: United States Navy
- Rank: Lieutenant (junior grade)
- Battles/wars: World War II

Francis Xavier Bellotti (May 3, 1923 – December 17, 2024) was an American lawyer and politician who served as both the 39th attorney general and the 61st lieutenant governor of Massachusetts.

== Early life ==
Bellotti was born in Boston, Massachusetts. He graduated from Tufts University in 1947 and received his J.D. degree from Boston College in 1952. He served in the United States Navy during World War II reaching the rank of Lieutenant (junior grade).

== Political career ==
In his first campaign for public office in 1958, Bellotti was the Democratic nominee for district attorney of Norfolk County, Massachusetts, but was defeated in the general election. In 1962 Bellotti was elected lieutenant governor and served a two-year term.

In 1964, he challenged the sitting governor of his own party, Endicott Peabody, and defeated Peabody in the Democratic primary. However, he went on to lose the general election to John A. Volpe, with Volpe regaining the seat that he had lost two years earlier. In 1966, Bellotti was the Democratic nominee for Massachusetts attorney general, but was defeated by Republican Elliot Richardson.

In 1974 he was elected to the attorney-generalship for what was now a four-year term and was reelected twice (serving until 1987).

In his official capacity for the state, he was the named party in the commercial speech case: First National Bank of Boston v. Bellotti, 435 U.S. 765 (1978), which established that corporations have some free speech rights under the First Amendment to the United States Constitution.

== Later life, career, and legacy ==
In 2012, the district courthouse in Quincy, Massachusetts, was named in his honor.

Bellotti was later the vice chairman of Arbella Insurance Group.

Bellotti turned 100 on May 3, 2023, and died at his home in Hingham, Massachusetts December 17, 2024, at the age of 101.

Reflecting on Bellotti's legacy following his death, the current Massachusetts Attorney General Andrea Campbell wrote in The Boston Globe that: "His forward thinking and innovation positioned the attorney general’s office as a guardian of the rule of law and social justice. He wielded the law to protect fundamental rights and uphold public trust. He put fairness above all else."

== Gallery ==
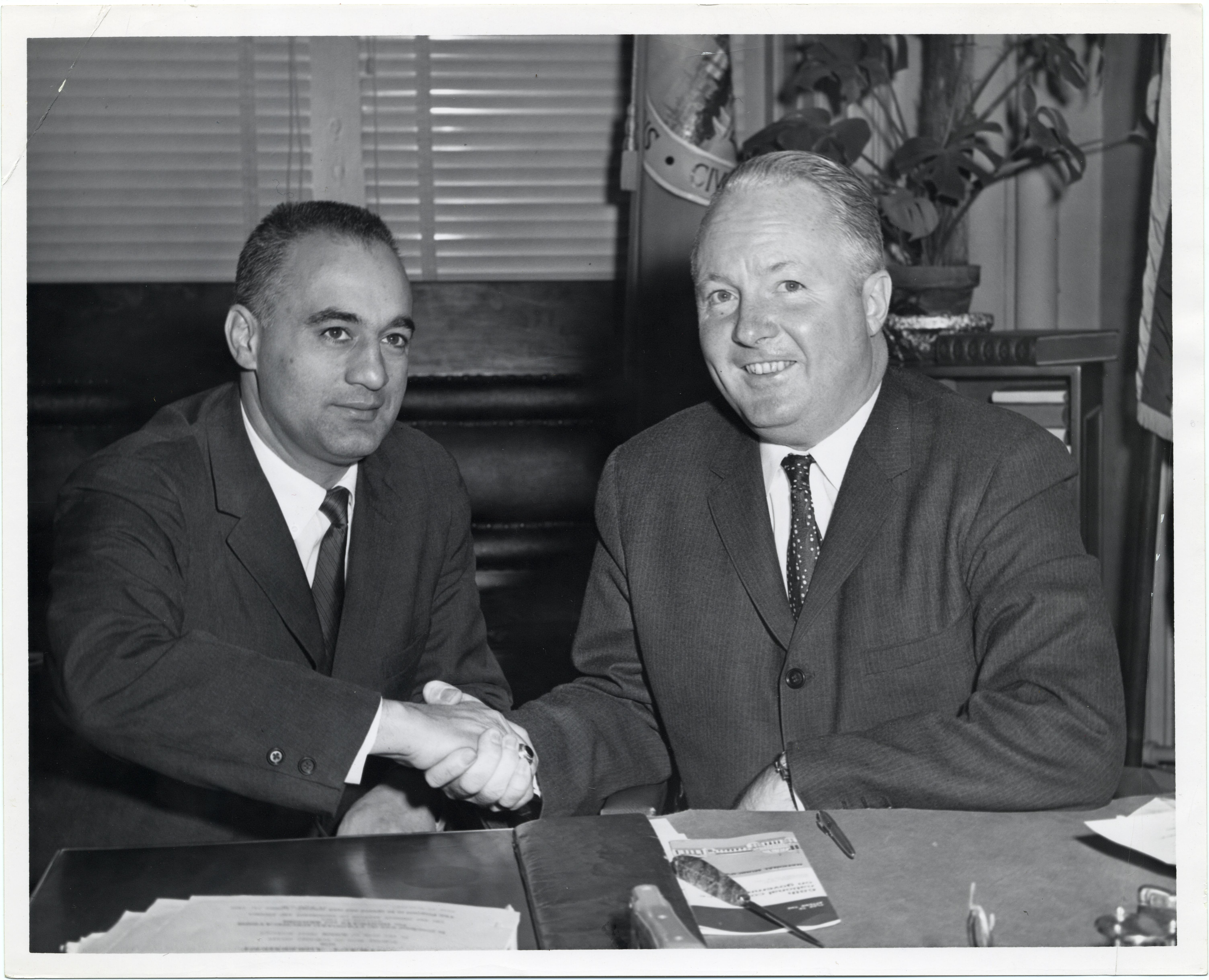
Bellotti shakes hands with Boston Mayor John F. Collins in Collins's office at the Old Boston City Hall (circa 1962)

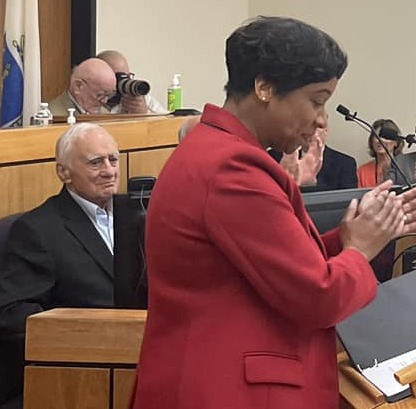
Bellotti listens as Massachusetts Attorney General Andrea Campbell speaks in recognition of his 100th birthday on May 3, 2023

Party political offices
Preceded by Edward F. McLaughlin Jr.	Democratic nominee for Lieutenant Governor of Massachusetts; 1962	Succeeded by John W. Costello
Preceded by Endicott Peabody	Democratic nominee for Governor of Massachusetts; 1964	Succeeded by Edward J. McCormack Jr.
Preceded by James W. Hennigan Jr.	Democratic nominee for Attorney General of Massachusetts; 1966	Succeeded by Robert H. Quinn
Preceded by Robert H. Quinn	Democratic nominee for Attorney General of Massachusetts; 1974, 1978, 1982	Succeeded by James Shannon
Political offices
Preceded by Edward F. McLaughlin, Jr.	Lieutenant Governor of Massachusetts; 1963–1965	Succeeded by Elliot Richardson
Legal offices
Preceded by Robert H. Quinn	Attorney General of Massachusetts; 1975–1987	Succeeded by James Shannon
