= 1950 Massachusetts elections =

1950 Massachusetts general election
- November 7, 1950

Part of the 1950 United States elections

The 1950 Massachusetts general election was held on November 7, 1950, throughout Massachusetts. Primary elections took place on September 19.

At the federal level, Republicans maintained their majority in the state by holding eight of fourteen seats in the United States House of Representatives. Incumbents were re-elected in each House seat.

In the race for Governor, Democratic incumbent Paul Dever was re-elected over former Lieutenant Governor Arthur W. Coolidge.

Democratic incumbents swept the six elections for statewide offices.

== Governor ==
Democratic incumbent Paul A. Dever was reelected over Republican Arthur W. Coolidge, Socialist Labor candidate Horace Hillis, and Prohibition candidate Mark R. Shaw.

== Lieutenant governor ==
Democratic incumbent Charles F. Sullivan was reelected over Republican Laurence Curtis and Socialist Labor candidate Lawrence Gilfedder.

=== Democratic primary ===
==== Candidates ====
- William N. Bergan, Hull selectman
- G. Edward Bradley, Mayor of Somerville
- John Francis Cahill, former Democratic State Committee Chair
- J. Frank Murphy
- Charles F. Sullivan, incumbent Lieutenant Governor

==== Results ====
1950 Democratic Lt. gubernatorial primary
Party	Candidate	Votes	%
Democratic	Charles F. Sullivan (incumbent)	196,638	52.68%
Democratic	G. Edward Bradley	55,176	14.78%
Democratic	J. Frank Murphy	49,095	13.15%
Democratic	John Francis Cahill	47,635	12.76%
Democratic	William N. Bergan	24,718	6.62%
Total votes		373,262	100.00%

=== Republican primary ===
==== Candidates ====
- Laurence Curtis, former Treasurer and Receiver-General of Massachusetts
- Warren G. Harris, former Governor's Councilor
- Daniel E. McLean, former Mayor of Beverly
- Harris S. Richardson, State Senator
- Robert W. Welch, Jr., businessman and founder of the John Birch Society

==== Results ====
1950 Republican Lt. gubernatorial primary
Party	Candidate	Votes	%
Republican	Laurence Curtis	162,506	46.73%
Republican	Robert W. Welch, Jr.	59,073	16.99%
Republican	Harris S. Richardson	52,994	15.24%
Republican	Daniel E. McLean	40,492	11.64%
Republican	Warren G. Harris	32,677	9.40%
Total votes		347,742	100.00%

=== General election ===
Massachusetts Lt. gubernatorial election, 1950
Party	Candidate	Votes	%	±%
Democratic	Charles F. Sullivan (incumbent)	982,014	52.64%	
Republican	Laurence Curtis	870,542	46.66%	
Socialist Labor	Lawrence Gilfedder	13,009	0.70%	
Total votes		1,865,565	100.00%	

== Attorney general ==
Incumbent Francis E. Kelly attorney general defeated Benjamin F. Chesky, Eli Y. Krovitsky, Isadore H. Y. Muchnick in the Democratic primary and Republican Frederick Ayer Jr., Socialist Workers candidate Anthony Martin, and Prohibition candidate Howard B. Rand in the general election.

=== Democratic primary ===
==== Candidates ====
- Benjamin F. Chesky
- Francis E. Kelly, incumbent Attorney General
- Eli Y. Krovitsky
- Isadore H. Y. Muchnick, member of the Boston School Committee

==== Results ====
1950 Massachusetts Attorney General Democratic Primary
Party	Candidate	Votes	%
Democratic	Francis E. Kelly (incumbent)	292,450	76.74%
Democratic	Isadore H. Y. Muchnick	60,708	15.94%
Democratic	Benjamin F. Chesky	15,416	4.04%
Democratic	Eli Y. Krovitsky	12,471	3.27%
Total votes		381,045	100.00%

=== Republican primary ===
==== Candidates ====
- Frederick Ayer Jr., Republican Party fundraiser and nephew of George S. Patton
- Edward Butterworth, former State Representative
- George Fingold, member of the Malden City Council
- Edwin W. Hadley, professor at Northeastern University School of Law
- Frank F. Walters

==== Results ====
1950 Massachusetts Attorney General Republican Primary
Party	Candidate	Votes	%
Republican	Frederick Ayer Jr.	117,256	34.94%
Republican	George Fingold	101,037	30.11%
Republican	Edward Butterworth	60,738	18.10%
Republican	Edwin W. Hadley	36,534	10.88%
Republican	Frank F. Walters	19,971	5.95%
Write-in	All others	2	0.00%
Total votes		335,538	100.00%

=== General election ===
1950 Massachusetts Attorney General Election
Party	Candidate	Votes	%	±%
Democratic	Francis E. Kelly (incumbent)	957,262	51.87%	
Republican	Frederick Ayer Jr.	868,871	47.08%	
Socialist Labor	Anthony Martin	13,237	0.71%	
Prohibition	Howard B. Rand	5,888	0.31%	
Write-in	All others	8	0.00%	
Total votes		1,845,266	100.00%	

== Secretary of the Commonwealth ==
=== Democratic primary ===
==== Candidates ====
- Anthony L. Bruno
- Stephen J. Carr
- Edward J. Cronin, incumbent Secretary of the Commonwealth
- Martin Graham
- Paul V. Shaughnessy, member of the Waltham School Committee
- Alfred L. Smith
- Alfred R. Vitale
- John F. Welch

==== Results ====
1950 Massachusetts Secretary of the Commonwealth Democratic Primary
Party	Candidate	Votes	%
Democratic	Edward J. Cronin (incumbent)	190,380	52.97%
Democratic	Stephen J. Carr	38,418	10.69%
Democratic	Paul V. Shaughnessy	36,085	10.04%
Democratic	Anthony L. Bruno	31,277	8.70%
Democratic	John F. Welch	22,063	6.13%
Democratic	Alfred R. Vitale	18,796	5.23%
Democratic	Alfred L. Smith	12,369	3.43%
Democratic	Martin Graham	10,053	2.79%
Write-in	All others	1	0.00%
Total votes		359,442	100.00%

=== Republican primary ===
==== Candidates ====
- John Adams
- William B. Bailey, former State Representative
- Henry Clay
- Douglas Lawson
- Ranny Weeks, bandleader
- Russell A. Wood, former Massachusetts Auditor and State Representative
- Ada F. York

==== Results ====
1950 Massachusetts Secretary of the Commonwealth Republican Primary
Party	Candidate	Votes	%
Republican	Russell A. Wood	84,052	25.77%
Republican	Randall W. "Ranny" Weeks	61,931	18.99%
Republican	John Adams	55,637	17.06%
Republican	William B. Bailey	49,589	15.20%
Republican	Douglas Lawson	35,696	10.94%
Republican	Henry Clay	23,931	7.33%
Republican	Ada F. York	15,238	4.67%
Total votes		326,074	100.00%

=== General election ===
1950 Massachusetts Secretary of the Commonwealth Election
Party	Candidate	Votes	%	±%
Democratic	Edward J. Cronin (incumbent)	1,004,632	54.89%	
Republican	Russell A. Wood	801,162	43.78%	
Socialist Labor	Fred M. Ingersoll	13,398	0.73%	
Prohibition	Ellsworth J. M. Dickson	10,743	0.58%	
Write-in	All others	2	0.00%	
Total votes		1,829,937	100.00%	

== Treasurer and Receiver-General ==
=== Republican primary ===
==== Candidates ====
- Fred J. Burrell, former Treasurer and Receiver-General
- Roy C. Papalia, Watertown selectman

==== Results ====
1950 Massachusetts Treasurer and Receiver-General Republican Primary
Party	Candidate	Votes	%
Republican	Fred J. Burrell	194,784	59.00%
Republican	Roy C. Papalia	135,321	40.99%
Write-in	All others	1	0.00%
Total votes		330,106	100.00%

=== General election ===
1950 Massachusetts Treasurer and Receiver-General Election
Party	Candidate	Votes	%	±%
Democratic	John E. Hurley (incumbent)	1,101,367	60.27%	
Republican	Fred J. Burrell	702,604	38.45%	
Socialist Labor	Henning A. Blomen	11,968	0.65%	
Prohibition	Harold J. Ireland	11,289	0.61%	
Write-in	All others	17	0.00%	

== Auditor ==
=== Republican primary ===
==== Candidates ====
- William G. Andrew, former interim district attorney of Middlesex County, Massachusetts
- Warren A. Rood

==== Results ====
1950 Massachusetts State Auditor Republican Primary
Party	Candidate	Votes	%
Republican	William G. Andrew	238,762	86.02%
Republican	Warren A. Rood	38,797	13.97%
Write-in	All others	1	0.00%
Total votes		277,560	100.00%

=== General election ===
1950 Massachusetts Auditor General Election
Party	Candidate	Votes	%	±%
Democratic	Thomas J. Buckley (incumbent)	1,082,350	59.21%	
Republican	William G. Andrew	724,058	39.61%	
Socialist Labor	Francis A. Votano	13,498	0.73%	
Prohibition	Robert A. Simmons	7,844	0.42%	
Write-in		2	0.00%	
Total votes		1,827,752	100.00%	

== See also ==
- 157th Massachusetts General Court (1951–1952)
