= 1954 Massachusetts elections =

1954 Massachusetts general election
- November 2, 1954

Part of the 1954 United States elections

A Massachusetts general election was held on November 2, 1954, in the Commonwealth of Massachusetts.

The election included:

- statewide elections for United States Senator, Governor, Lieutenant Governor, Attorney General, Secretary of the Commonwealth, Treasurer, and Auditor;
- district elections for U.S. Representatives, State Representatives, State Senators, and Governor's Councillors; and
- ballot questions at the state and local levels.

Democratic and Republican candidates were selected in party primaries held on September 14, 1954.

== Governor ==
Republican incumbent Christian Herter was re-elected over Robert F. Murphy.

== Lieutenant governor ==
1956 Massachusetts Lieutenant Governor election
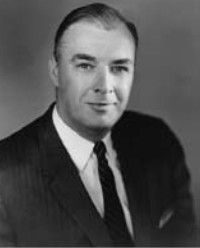

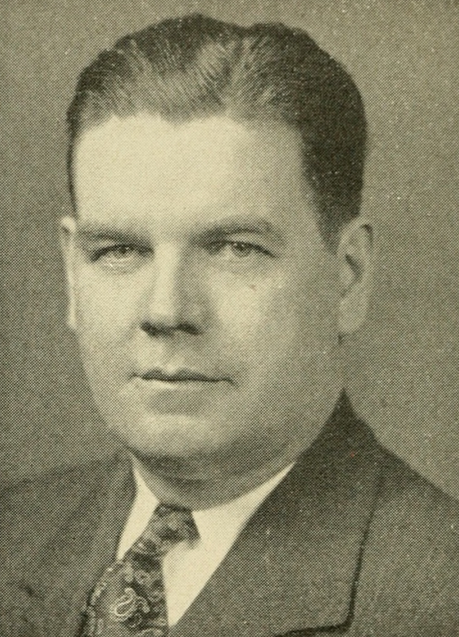
Nominee	Sumner G. Whittier	James A. Burke
Party	Republican	Democratic
Popular vote	972,745	883,440
Percentage	52.0%	47.2%
Lieutenant Governor before election
Sumner Whittier
Republican
Elected Lieutenant Governor
Sumner Whittier
Republican

Republican Sumner Whittier was re-elected lieutenant governor over Democrat James A. Burke, Socialist Labor candidate Francis A. Votano, and Prohibition candidate Donald E. Babcock.

=== General election ===
==== Candidates ====
- Donald E. Babcock (Prohibition)
- James A. Burke, state representative from Hyde Park (Democratic)
- Sumner G. Whittier, incumbent lieutenant governor since 1953 (Republican)
- Francis A. Votano (Socialist Labor)

==== Results ====
Massachusetts Lt. gubernatorial election, 1954
Party	Candidate	Votes	%	±%
Republican	Sumner G. Whittier	972,745	52.01%	
Democratic	James A. Burke	883,440	47.23%	
Socialist Labor	Francis A. Votano	9,215	0.49%	
Prohibition	Donald E. Babcock	5,067	0.27%	
Total votes		1,870,467	100.00%	

== Attorney general ==
1954 Massachusetts Attorney General election
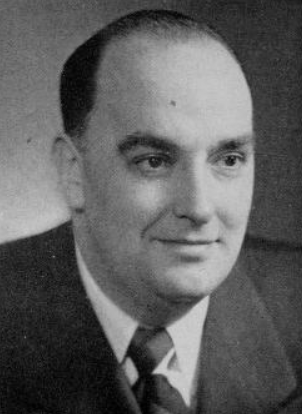

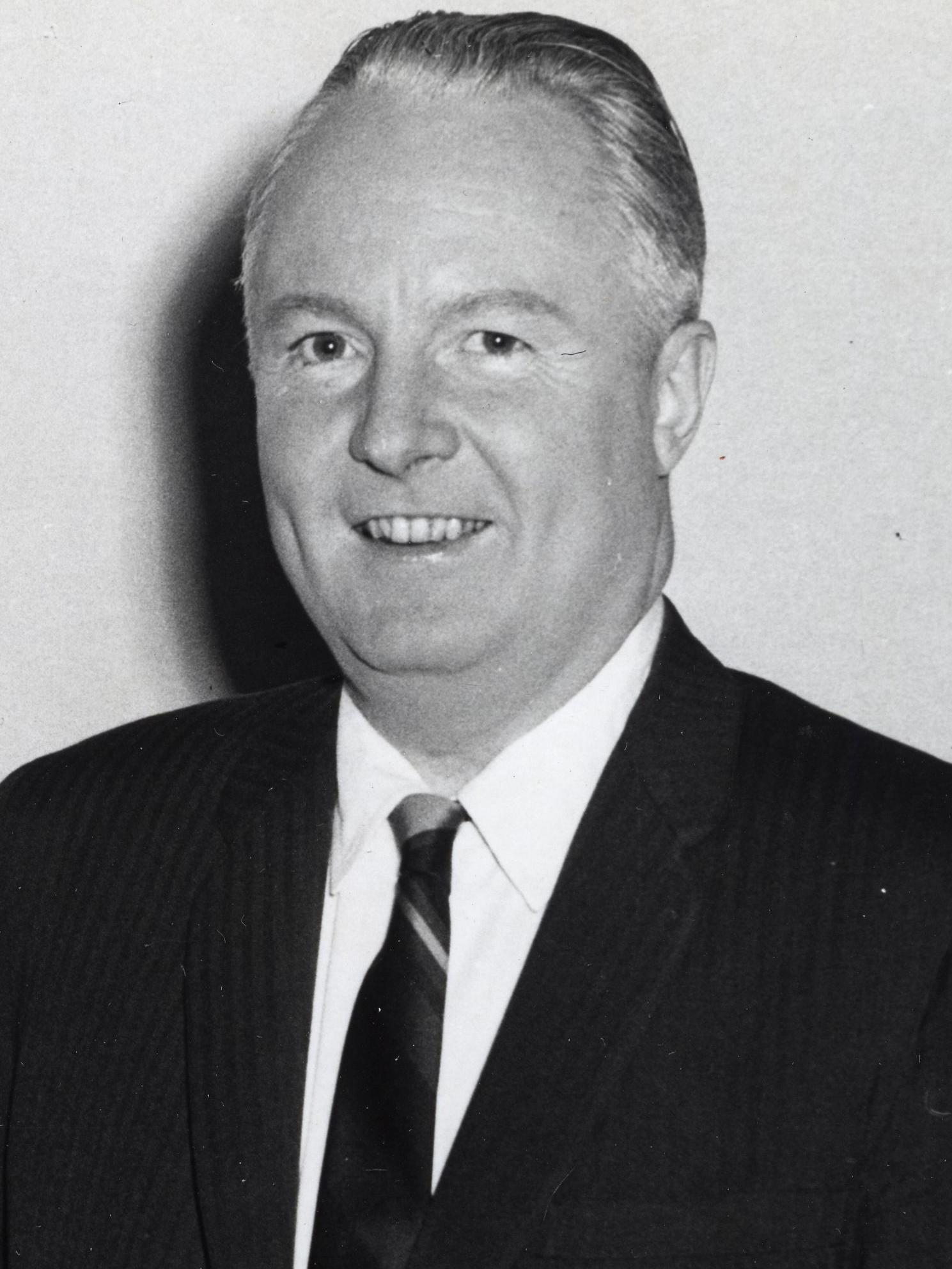
Nominee	George Fingold	John F. Collins
Party	Republican	Democratic
Popular vote	972,745	893,825
Percentage	51.2%	48.2%
Attorney General before election
George Fingold
Republican
Elected Attorney General
George Fingold
Republican

Republican attorney general George Fingold was re-elected over Democratic State Senator John F. Collins, Socialist Workers candidate Malcolm T. Rowe, and Prohibition candidate Howard B. Rand in the general election.

=== General election ===
==== Candidates ====
- John F. Collins, state senator from Jamaica Plain (Democratic)
- George Fingold, incumbent attorney general since 1953 (Republican)
- Howard B. Rand (Prohibition)
- Malcolm T. Rowe (Socialist Workers)

==== Results ====
Massachusetts Attorney General Election, 1954
Party	Candidate	Votes	%	±%
Republican	George Fingold (incumbent)	950,865	51.22%	
Democratic	John F. Collins	893,825	48.16%	
Socialist Workers	Malcolm T. Rowe	6,004	0.32%	
Prohibition	Howard B. Rand	5,425	0.29%	
Write-in		1	0.00%	
Total votes		1,856,120	100.00%	

== Secretary of the Commonwealth ==
1954 Massachusetts Secretary of the Commonwealth election
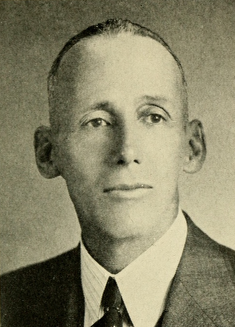
Nominee	Edward J. Cronin	Michael J. McCarthy
Party	Democratic	Republican
Popular vote	1,018,428	793,121
Percentage	55.6%	43.3%
Secretary of the Commonwealth before election
Edward J. Cronin
Democratic
Elected Secretary of the Commonwealth
Edward J. Cronin
Democratic

Incumbent Secretary of the Commonwealth Edward J. Cronin defeated Republican state representative Michael J. McCarthy, Socialist Labor candidate Fred M. Ingersoll, and Prohibition candidate William D. Ross in the general election.

=== General election ===
==== Candidates ====
- Edward J. Cronin, incumbent secretary since 1949 (Democratic)
- Fred M. Ingersoll (Socialist Workers)
- Michael J. McCarthy, state representative from East Bridgewater (Republican)
- William D. Ross (Prohibition)

==== Results ====
Massachusetts Secretary of the Commonwealth Election, 1954
Party	Candidate	Votes	%	±%
Democratic	Edward J. Cronin (incumbent)	1,018,428	55.62%	
Republican	Michael J. McCarthy	793,121	43.32%	
Socialist Workers	Fred M. Ingersoll	10,613	0.58%	
Prohibition	William D. Ross	8,833	0.48%	
Write-in		1	0.00%	
Total votes		1,830,996	100.00%	

== Treasurer and Receiver-General ==
1954 Massachusetts Treasurer and Receiver-General election

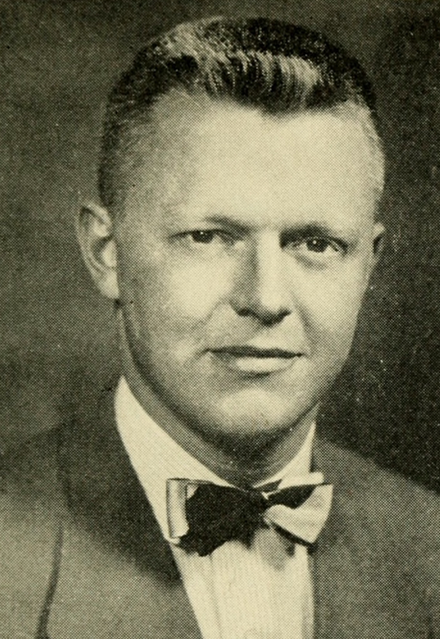
Nominee	John Francis Kennedy	Augustus Gardner Means
Party	Democratic	Republican
Popular vote	1,004,145	830,263
Percentage	54.4%	45.0%
Treasurer before election
Foster Furcolo
Democratic
Elected Treasurer
John Francis Kennedy
Democratic

Incumbent Treasurer and Receiver-General Foster Furcolo ran for a U.S. Senate seat instead of seeking re-election. John Francis Kennedy defeated Norwood Selectman Clement A. Riley and State Representative and Boston School Committee Chair William F. Carr in the Democratic primary and Republican Augustus Gardner Means, Socialist Labor candidate Henning A. Blomen, and Prohibition candidate Isaac Goddard in the general election.

=== Democratic primary ===
==== Candidates ====
- William F. Carr, Boston School Committee chair and former State Representative from South Boston
- John Francis Kennedy, Gillette stockroom supervisor
- Clement A. Riley, Norwood selectman

Massachusetts Treasurer and Receiver-General Democratic Primary, 1954
Party	Candidate	Votes	%	±%
Democratic	John Francis Kennedy	124,884	36.84%	
Democratic	Clement A. Riley	110,221	32.53%	
Democratic	William F. Carr	103,857	30.63%	
Write-in		3	0.00%	

=== General election ===
==== Candidates ====
- Henning A. Blomen, perennial candidate (Socialist Workers)
- Issac Goddard (Prohibition)
- John Francis Kennedy, Gillette stockroom supervisor (Democratic)
- Augustus Gardner Means, state representative from Beverly (Republican)

==== Results ====
Massachusetts Treasurer and Receiver-General Election, 1954
Party	Candidate	Votes	%	±%
Democratic	John Francis Kennedy	1,004,145	54.37%	
Republican	Augustus Gardner Means	830,263	44.96%	
Socialist Workers	Henning A. Blomen	7,325	0.40%	
Prohibition	Issac Goddard	5,069	0.27%	
Write-in		1	0.00%	
Total votes		1,846,803	100.00%	

== Auditor ==
1954 Massachusetts Auditor election
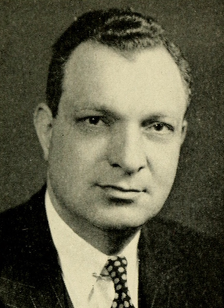
Nominee	Thomas J. Buckley	William P. Constantino
Party	Democratic	Republican
Popular vote	1,075,162	741,082
Percentage	58.7%	40.5%
Auditor before election
Thomas J. Buckley
Democratic
Elected Auditor
Thomas J. Buckley
Democratic

Incumbent Auditor Thomas J. Buckley defeated Republican state representative William P. Constantino, Socialist Labor candidate Anthony Martin, and Prohibition candidate John B. Lauder in the general election.

=== General election ===
==== Candidates ====
- Thomas J. Buckley, incumbent auditor since 1941 (Democratic)
- William P. Constantino, state representative from Clinton (Republican)
- John B. Lauder (Prohibition)
- Anthony Martin (Socialist Workers)

==== Results ====
Massachusetts Auditor Election, 1954
Party	Candidate	Votes	%	±%
Democratic	Thomas J. Buckley (incumbent)	1,075,162	58.69%	
Republican	William P. Constantino	741,082	40.45%	
Socialist Workers	Anthony Martin	9,483	0.52%	
Prohibition	John B. Lauder	6,198	0.34%	
Write-in		2	0.00%	
Total votes		1,831,925	100.00%	

== U.S. Senator ==
Republican Leverett Saltonstall was re-elected over Democrat Foster Furcolo, Socialist Labor candidate Thelma Ingersoll, and Prohibition candidate Harold J. Ireland.
