= 1952 Massachusetts elections =

1952 Massachusetts general election
- November 4, 1952

Part of the 1952 United States elections

A Massachusetts general election was held on November 4, 1952 in the Commonwealth of Massachusetts. Primary elections took place on September 16.

At the federal level, Representative John F. Kennedy defeated incumbent Senator Henry Cabot Lodge in a close election.

In the race for Governor, Republican Christian Herter defeated incumbent Democrat Paul Dever. Republicans also defeated incumbent Democrats in the races for Lieutenant Governor and Attorney General.

== Governor ==
Republican Christian Herter was elected over Democratic incumbent Paul A. Dever, Peace Progressive candidate Florence H. Luscomb, Socialist Labor candidate Lawrence Gilfedder, and Prohibition candidate Guy S. Williams.

== Lieutenant governor ==
1952 Massachusetts Lieutenant Governor election
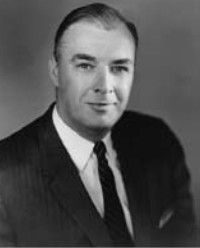

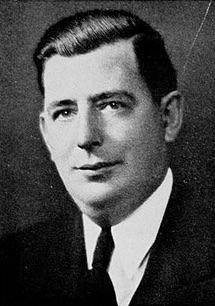
Nominee	Sumner G. Whittier	Charles F. Sullivan
Party	Republican	Democratic
Popular vote	1,194,966	1,087,865
Percentage	51.9%	47.2%
Lieutenant Governor before election
Charles F. Sullivan
Democratic
Elected Lieutenant Governor
Sumner Whittier
Republican

Republican Sumner G. Whittier was elected lieutenant governor over Democratic incumbent Charles F. Sullivan.

=== Democratic primary ===
==== Candidates ====
- Thomas B. Brennan, Middlesex County Commissioner
- Edward C. Carroll, former State Senator
- Thomas J. Kurey, businessman
- C. Gerald Lucey, mayor of Brockton
- Joseph L. Murphy, former State Senator
- Charles F. Sullivan, incumbent Lieutenant Governor

==== Results ====
1952 Democratic Lt. gubernatorial primary
Party	Candidate	Votes	%
Democratic	Charles F. Sullivan (incumbent)	192,945	45.70%
Democratic	C. Gerald Lucey	68,914	16.32%
Democratic	Joseph L. Murphy	55,546	13.16%
Democratic	Thomas B. Brennan	44,239	10.48%
Democratic	Edward C. Carroll	42,361	10.03%
Democratic	Thomas J. Kurey	18,166	4.30%
Total votes		377,932	100.00%

=== Republican primary ===
==== Candidates ====
- Sumner Whittier, state senator

==== Results ====
Sumner Whittier ran unopposed for the Republican nomination for Lt. Governor.

=== General election ===
==== Candidates ====
- William R. Ferry (Prohibition)
- Charles F. Sullivan, incumbent lieutenant governor (Democratic)
- Francis A. Votano (Socialist Labor)
- Sumner Whittier, state senator (Republican)

==== Results ====
1952 Massachusetts Lt. gubernatorial election
Party	Candidate	Votes	%	±%
Republican	Sumner G. Whittier	1,194,966	51.88%	
Democratic	Charles F. Sullivan (incumbent)	1,087,865	47.23%	
Socialist Labor	Francis A. Votano	13,602	0.59%	
Prohibition	William R. Ferry	7,013	0.30%	
Total votes		2,303,446	100.00%	
Republican gain from Democratic				

== Attorney General ==
1952 Massachusetts Attorney General election
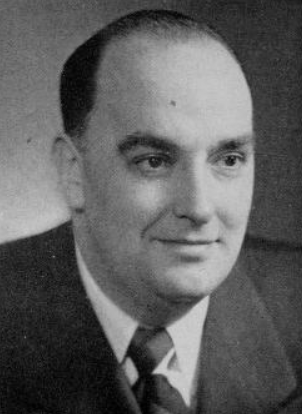

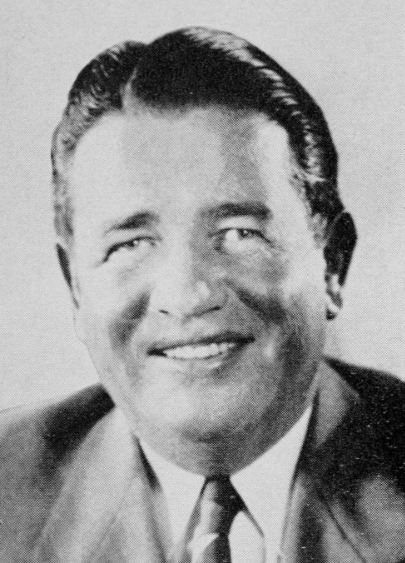
Nominee	George Fingold	Francis E. Kelly
Party	Republican	Democratic
Popular vote	1,305,185	950,351
Percentage	57.4%	41.8%
Attorney General before election
Francis E. Kelly
Democratic
Elected Attorney General
George Fingold
Republican

Republican George Fingold was elected Attorney General over Democratic incumbent Francis E. Kelly.

=== Democratic primary ===
==== Candidates ====
- Robert T. Capeless
- Francis E. Kelly, incumbent Attorney General
- George Leary
- John V. Moran

==== Results ====
1952 Attorney General Democratic primary
Party	Candidate	Votes	%
Democratic	Francis E. Kelly (incumbent)	204,155	46.35%
Democratic	Robert T. Capeless	87,968	19.97%
Democratic	John V. Moran	75,252	17.09%
Democratic	George Leary	73,082	16.59%
Write-in		4	0.00%
Total votes		440,461	100.00%

=== General election ===
==== Candidates ====
- Arthur W. Blomen (Socialist Workers)
- George Fingold, former Middlesex County assistant district attorney and assistant Massachusetts attorney general
- Francis E. Kelly, incumbent attorney general (Democratic)
- Howard B. Rand (Prohibition)

==== Results ====
1952 Massachusetts Attorney General election
Party	Candidate	Votes	%	±%
Republican	George Fingold	1,305,185	57.40%	
Democratic	Francis E. Kelly (incumbent)	950,351	41.80%	
Socialist Workers	Arthur W. Blomen	9,501	0.42%	
Prohibition	Howard B. Rand	8,795	0.39%	
Write-in		11	0.00%	
Total votes		2,273,843	100.00%	
Republican gain from Democratic				

== Secretary of the Commonwealth ==
1952 Massachusetts Secretary of the Commonwealth election
Nominee	Edward J. Cronin	Beatrice Hancock Mullaney
Party	Democratic	Republican
Popular vote	1,147,881	1,088,629
Percentage	50.8%	48.1%
Secretary of the Commonwealth before election
Edward J. Cronin
Democratic
Elected Secretary of the Commonwealth
Edward J. Cronin
Democratic

Incumbent Secretary of the Commonwealth Edward J. Cronin defeated Republican Beatrice Hancock Mullaney.

=== General election ===
==== Candidates ====
- Edward J. Cronin, incumbent secretary (Democratic)
- Alice M. Ferry (Prohibition)
- Fred M. Ingersoll (Socialist Workers)
- Beatrice Hancock Mullaney, former assistant Massachusetts attorney general (Republican)

==== Results ====
1952 Massachusetts Secretary of the Commonwealth election
Party	Candidate	Votes	%	±%
Democratic	Edward J. Cronin (incumbent)	1,147,881	50.75%	
Republican	Beatrice Hancock Mullaney	1,088,629	48.13%	
Socialist Workers	Fred M. Ingersoll	13,499	0.60%	
Prohibition	Alice M. Ferry	11,926	0.53%	
Write-in		2	0.00%	
Total votes		2,261,937	100.00%	
Democratic hold				

== Treasurer and Receiver-General ==
1952 Massachusetts Treasurer and Receiver-General election
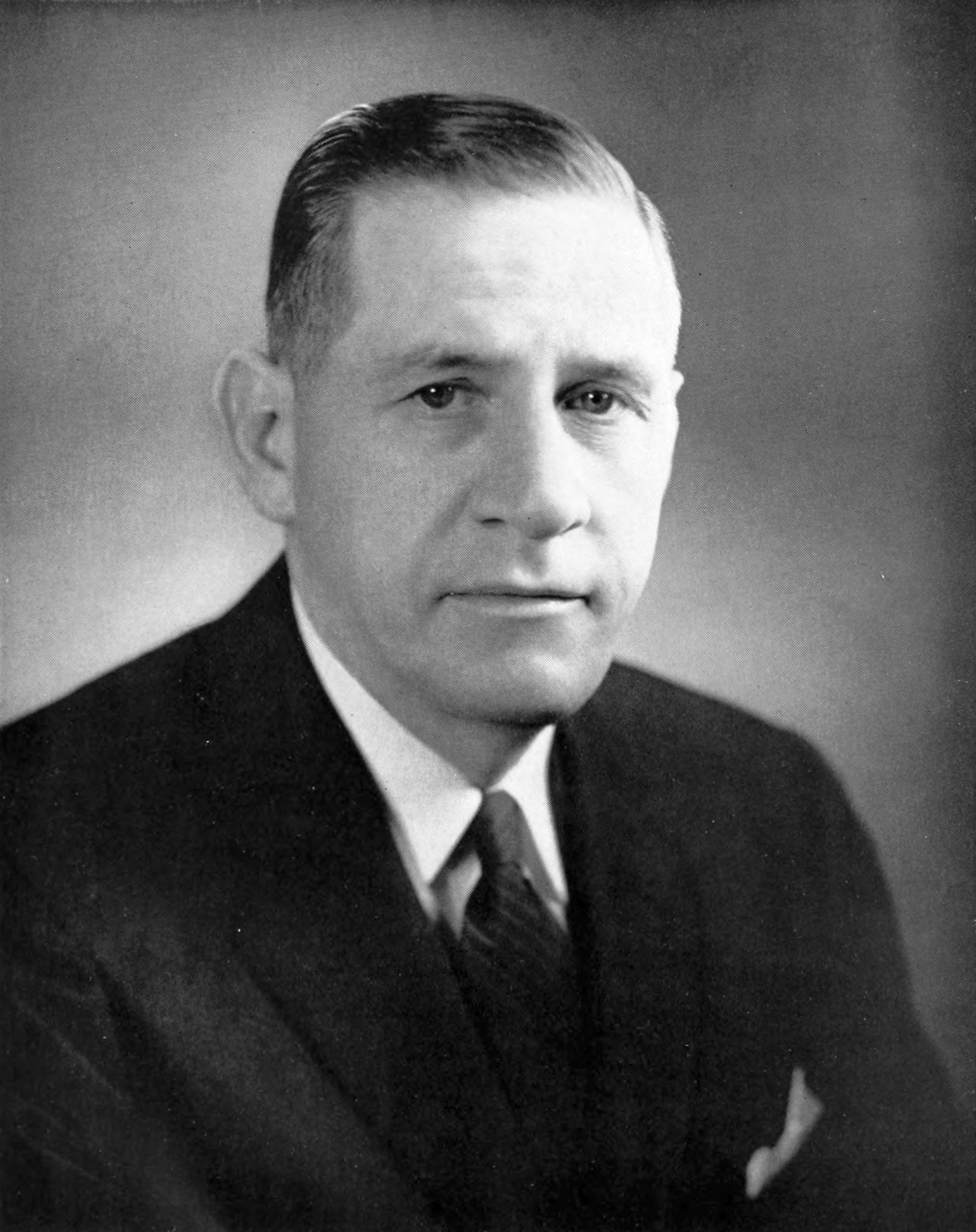

Nominee	Foster Furcolo	Roy Papalia
Party	Democratic	Republican
Popular vote	1,154,057	830,263
Percentage	51.0%	47.9%
Treasurer before election
Foster Furcolo
Democratic
Elected Treasurer
Foster Furcolo
Democratic

Incumbent Treasurer and Receiver-General Foster Furcolo defeated Republican Roy C. Papalia.

=== Democratic primary ===
==== Candidates ====
- William R. Conley, former State Senator
- Cornelius P. Cronin, former Chair of the Boston Housing Authority
- James E.V. Donelan, state public works employee
- Foster Furcolo, incumbent Treasurer and Receiver-General
- John Francis Kennedy, Gillette stockroom supervisor
- Jeremiah F. Murphy Jr.
- Alexander F. Sullivan, former State Representative

==== Results ====
1952 Massachusetts Treasurer Democratic primary
Party	Candidate	Votes	%
Democratic	Foster Furcolo (incumbent)	169,156	39.30%
Democratic	John Francis Kennedy	86,536	20.11%
Democratic	Cornelius P. Cronin	66,337	15.41%
Democratic	William R. Conley	34,205	7.95%
Democratic	Alexander F. Sullivan	30,708	7.14%
Democratic	James E. V. Donelan	26,389	6.13%
Democratic	Jeremiah F. Murphy Jr.	18,077	3.97%
Write-in		3	0.00%
Total votes		431,411	

=== Republican primary ===
==== Candidates ====
- Fred J. Burrell, former Treasurer and Receiver-General
- Roy C. Papalia, Watertown selectman

==== Results ====
1952 Massachusetts Treasurer Republican primary
Party	Candidate	Votes	%	±%
Republican	Roy C. Papalia	234,841	58.79%	▲17.8
Republican	Fred J. Burrell	164,582	41.20%	▼17.8
Write-in		5	0.00%	Steady
Total votes		399,423	100.00%	

=== General election ===
==== Candidates ====
- Henning A. Blomen (Socialist Workers)
- Foster Furcolo, incumbent Treasurer and Receiver-General (Democratic)
- Harold J. Ireland (Prohibition)
- Roy C. Papalia, Watertown selectman (Republican)

==== Results ====
1952 Massachusetts Treasurer and Receiver-General election
Party	Candidate	Votes	%	±%
Democratic	Foster Furcolo (incumbent)	1,154,057	51.03%	▼9.24
Republican	Roy C. Papalia	1,083,530	47.91%	▲9.46
Prohibition	Harold J. Ireland	13,037	0.58%	▼0.03
Socialist Workers	Henning A. Blomen	10,824	0.48%	▼0.13
Write-in		4	0.00%	
Total votes		2,261,452	100.00%	
Democratic hold				

== Auditor ==
1952 Massachusetts Auditor election
Nominee	Thomas J. Buckley	David J. Mintz
Party	Democratic	Republican
Popular vote	1,206,665	1,037,597
Percentage	53.3%	45.9%
Auditor before election
Thomas J. Buckley
Democratic
Elected Auditor
Thomas J. Buckley
Democratic

Incumbent Auditor Thomas J. Buckley defeated Republican David J. Mintz, Socialist Labor candidate Anthony Martin, and Prohibition candidate Robert A. Simmons in the general election.

=== General election ===
1952 Massachusetts Auditor election
Party	Candidate	Votes	%	±%
Democratic	Thomas J. Buckley (incumbent)	1,206,665	53.32%	
Republican	David J. Mintz	1,037,597	45.85%	
Socialist Workers	Anthony Martin	11,735	0.52%	
Prohibition	Robert A. Simmons	7,086	0.31%	
Write-in		2	0.00%	
Total votes		2,263,085	100.00%	
Democratic hold				

== United States Senate ==
Democrat John F. Kennedy was elected over Republican incumbent Henry Cabot Lodge Jr..

== See also ==
- 158th Massachusetts General Court (1953–1954)
