= The Daily Advertiser (Lafayette, Louisiana) =

Daily newspaper

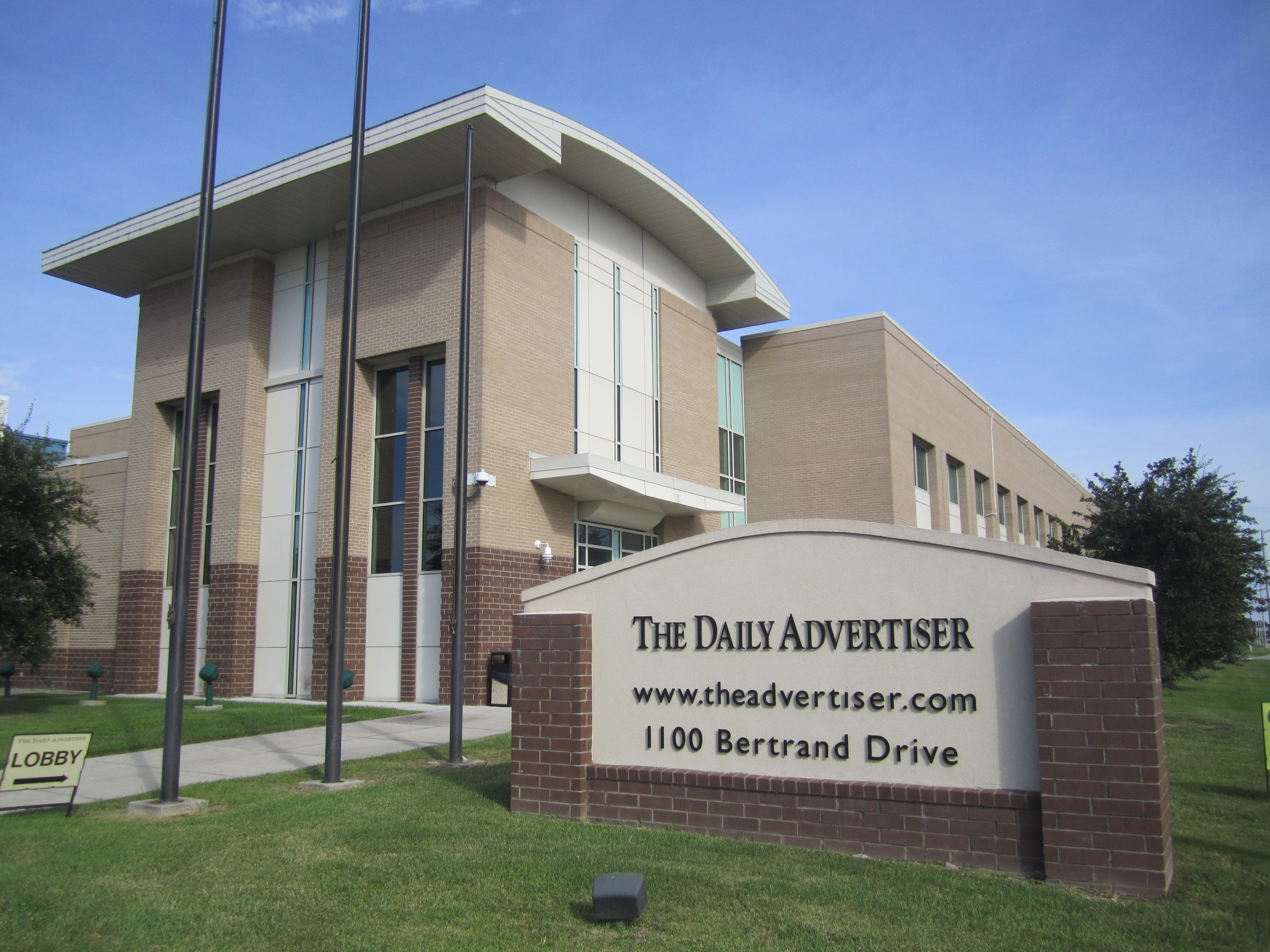
- The Daily Advertiser building
- Type: Daily newspaper
- Format: Berliner
- Owner: USA Today Co.
- Founder: William B. Bailey
- Editor: Barbara Leader
- Language: English
- Headquarters: Lafayette, Louisiana, United States
- Circulation: 3,996 Print; 468 Digital (as of 2022)
- Website: theadvertiser.com

The Daily Advertiser is a USA Today Co. daily newspaper based in Lafayette, Louisiana. The Daily Advertiser covers international, national, state, and local news in the six parishes of Lafayette, Acadia, Iberia, St. Landry, St. Martin, and Vermilion.

== History ==
The Daily Advertiser was co-founded as the Weekly Advertiser in 1865 by a Confederate States Army veteran, William B. Bailey, who subsequently served from 1884 to 1892 as mayor of his native Lafayette.

Louisiana journalist Robert Angers (1919–1988) worked at times for The Daily Advertiser, including his ultimate position as business editor from 1985 until his death.

In 1998, The Daily Advertiser bought the local alternative weekly, the Times of Acadiana.

The circulation area is approximately 27 percent nonwhite; the nonwhite employees of the newspaper totaled approximately 17 percent in 2005.

== Controversies ==
The Advertiser has been accused of protecting the Catholic Church during molestation charges brought against priests in the mid-1980s. Later, in 2014, it gave a prominent op-ed to William Donahue of the Catholic League defending the protection of accused priests by the Church, a piece that has been criticized as containing substantial inaccuracies, by one of the lawyers who had defended the Church in the 1980s.
