= 1954 Massachusetts gubernatorial election =

- November 2, 1954
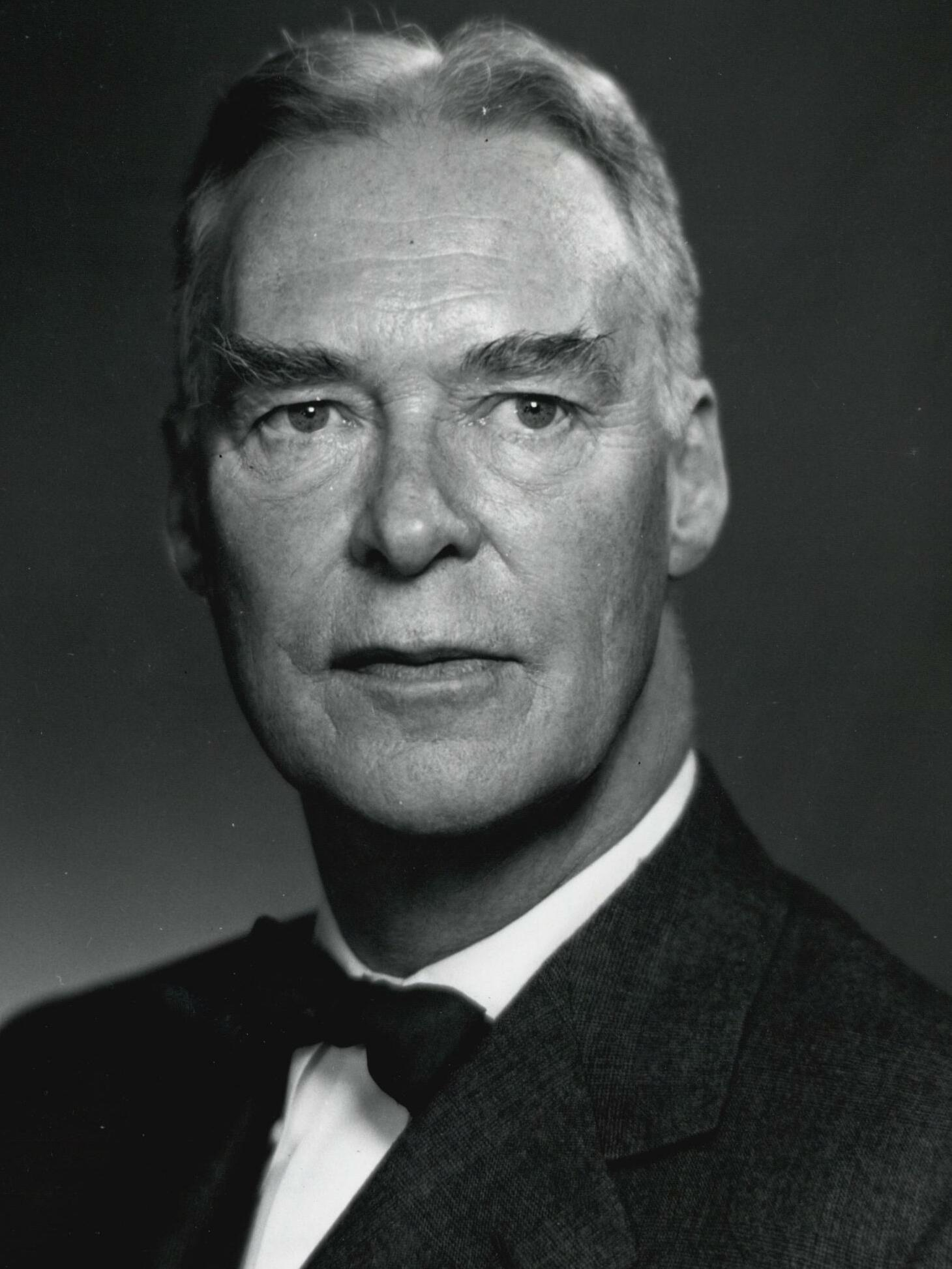

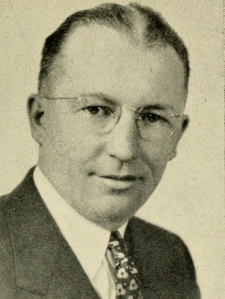
Nominee	Christian A. Herter	Robert F. Murphy
Party	Republican	Democratic
Popular vote	985,339	910,087
Percentage	51.76%	47.80%
- Herter: 40–50% 50–60% 60–70% 70–80% 80–90% >90% Murphy: 40–50% 50–60% 60–70% 70–80%
Governor before election
Christian A. Herter
Republican
Elected Governor
Christian A. Herter
Republican

The 1954 Massachusetts gubernatorial election was held on November 2, 1954. Republican Governor Christian Herter was re-elected, defeating Democrat Robert F. Murphy, Socialist Labor candidate Lawrence Gilfedder, and Prohibition candidate Guy S. Williams.

== Democratic primary ==
=== Candidates ===
- Francis E. Kelly, former lieutenant governor and attorney general
- Robert F. Murphy, state representative from Malden and minority leader of the House of Representatives

=== Results ===
Democratic gubernatorial primary, 1954
Party	Candidate	Votes	%	±%
Democratic	Robert F. Murphy	254,996	70.27%	
Democratic	Francis E. Kelly	107,861	29.73%	

== General election ==
=== Results ===
Massachusetts gubernatorial election, 1954
Party	Candidate	Votes	%	±%
Republican	Christian A. Herter (incumbent)	985,339	51.76%	
Democratic	Robert F. Murphy	910,087	47.80%	
Socialist Labor	Lawrence Gilfedder	5,766	0.30%	
Prohibition	Guy S. Williams	2,579	0.14%	

== See also ==
- 1953–1954 Massachusetts legislature
