= Warren Harris =

Warren Harris may refer to:

- Warren G. Harris, American politician in Massachusetts
- Warren Harris (serial killer), American serial killer
