= J. Henry Goguen =

American politician and teacher (1899-1982)

Joseph Henry Goguen

Massachusetts Public Safety Commissioner
- In office April 29, 1959 – July 20, 1961
- Preceded by: Otis M. Whitney
- Succeeded by: Frank S. Giles

Acting Massachusetts Secretary of the Commonwealth
- In office December 1, 1958 – January 20, 1959
- Preceded by: Edward J. Cronin
- Succeeded by: Joseph D. Ward

United States Marshal for the District of Massachusetts
- In office 1939–1947
- Preceded by: John J. Murphy
- Succeeded by: Arthur J. B. Cartier

Member of the Massachusetts House of Representatives from the 10th Worcester District
- In office 1931–1934

Member of the city council of Leominster, Massachusetts
- In office 1929–1930

Personal details
- Born: March 8, 1899 Fitchburg, Massachusetts, U.S.
- Died: December 15, 1982 (aged 83)
- Party: Democratic Party
- Spouse: Corinne Lamoureux
- Education: College of the Holy Cross (BA)
- Profession: Teacher; U.S. Marshal; Politician; Civil servant

Joseph Henry Goguen (March 8, 1899 – December 15, 1982) was a Massachusetts teacher, politician and civil servant, who served as Member of the city council of Leominster, Massachusetts, as a member of the Massachusetts House of Representatives, as the Massachusetts Public Safety Commissioner, the United States Marshall for the District of Massachusetts and, from 1958 to 1959, as the acting Secretary of the Commonwealth.

== Early life and education ==
Joseph Henri Goguen was born to Olivier Goguen, and Marie (LeBlanc) Goguen, on March 8, 1899, in Fitchburg, Massachusetts. His parents came from New Brunswick and were of Acadian descent. When Goguen was five years old his family moved to Leominster, Massachusetts. Goguen attended parochial school in Leominster, a private school in Nova Scotia, Assumption High School, Assumption College, and the College of the Holy Cross; from which he received his B. A. in 1922. Goguen commuted from Leominster to Worcester while attending Holy Cross and worked at a factory in Leominster during the summer. Gougen also studied at the Northeastern University School of Law, which had a campus in Worcester, and the Sorbonne in Paris.

== Family life ==
Goguen married Corinne Lamoureux. They had one daughter, Janice.

== Academic career ==
After graduating from Holy Cross, Goguen became the head of the science department at Assumption College and taught there for almost a decade.

== Political career ==
Goguen became interested in politics early in life. At the age of 29 he was elected to the Leominster City Council. In 1928 he campaigned for Democratic presidential candidate Al Smith in both English and French. From 1932 to 1934, Goguen was a member of the Massachusetts House of Representatives. During the presidency of Franklin D. Roosevelt, Goguen received a federal appointment as the deputy collector of internal revenue for Massachusetts. On May 17, 1939, Roosevelt nominated Goguen for the position of United States Marshal for the District of Massachusetts. He was confirmed by the United States Senate on June 12 and was sworn in on July 1. He was appointed to a second four-year term in 1943, but did not seek a third term in 1947. From 1946 to 1974, Goguen was the President General of Union Saint-Jean-Baptiste d'Amérique, a national fraternal order and social club for Franco-Americans. Goguen was named acting Secretary of the Commonwealth on December 1, 1958, following the death of Edward J. Cronin. He remained Secretary until the legislature elected Joseph D. Ward on January 20, 1959. Later that year he was appointed by Governor Foster Furcolo to serve as commissioner of public safety. Following the election of Republican Governor John A. Volpe in 1960, Goguen made an effort to retain his job. Volpe's first choice to replace Goguen, Robert H. Beaudreau, asked Volpe to withdraw his nomination because he felt the Democratic-controlled Executive Council was obstructing his nomination in order to keep Goguen. Volpe's second nominee, Frank S. Giles, was confirmed by the council on July 20, 1961, ending Goguen's tenure as commissioner.

Goguen was an alternate delegate to the 1932, 1952, and 1956 Democratic National Conventions.

== See also ==
- 1931–1932 Massachusetts legislature
- 1933–1934 Massachusetts legislature

Political offices
Preceded by Edward J. Cronin	Acting Massachusetts Secretary of the Commonwealth; December 1, 1958 – January 20, 1959	Succeeded by Joseph D. Ward
Preceded by Otis M. Whitney	Massachusetts Public Safety Commissioner; April 29, 1959 – July 20, 1961	Succeeded by Frank S. Giles
