= Michael J. McCarthy (politician) =

American politician

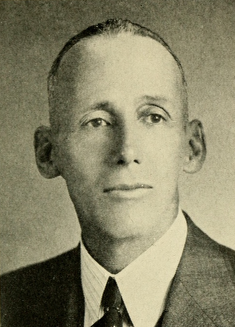

Massachusetts Commissioner of Veterans' Services
- In office 1955–1955
- Preceded by: William E. McNamara (acting)
- Succeeded by: Nathaniel M. Hurwitz

Member of the Massachusetts House of Representatives from the 5th Plymouth District
- In office 1943–1955
- Preceded by: Leo F. Nourse
- Succeeded by: Malcolm Blanchard Boyton

Personal details
- Born: October 23, 1890 East Bridgewater, Massachusetts, U.S.
- Died: June 12, 1955 (aged 64) East Bridgewater, Massachusetts, U.S.
- Party: Republican

Michael J. McCarthy (October 23, 1890 – June 12, 1955) was an American politician who was a member of the Massachusetts House of Representatives and Massachusetts Commissioner of Veterans' Services.

McCarthy was born on October 23, 1890, in East Bridgewater, Massachusetts. He spent his entire life in the town. He was a member of its board of selectmen for 19 years and town clerk for 21. From 1943 to 1955, McCarthy represented the 5th Plymouth District in the Massachusetts House of Representatives. In 1954 he was the Republican nominee for Massachusetts Secretary of the Commonwealth. He lost to incumbent Edward J. Cronin 56% to 43%. In January 1955, McCarthy was appointed Commissioner of Veterans' Services by Governor Christian A. Herter. McCarthy died on June 12, 1955, at his home.

== See also ==
- Massachusetts legislature: 1943–1944, 1945–1946, 1947–1948, 1949–1950, 1951–1952, 1953–1954

Party political offices
Preceded by Beatrice Hancock Mullaney	Republican nominee for Secretary of the Commonwealth of Massachusetts; 1954	Succeeded by Richard I. Furbush
