= 1952 Massachusetts gubernatorial election =

- November 4, 1952
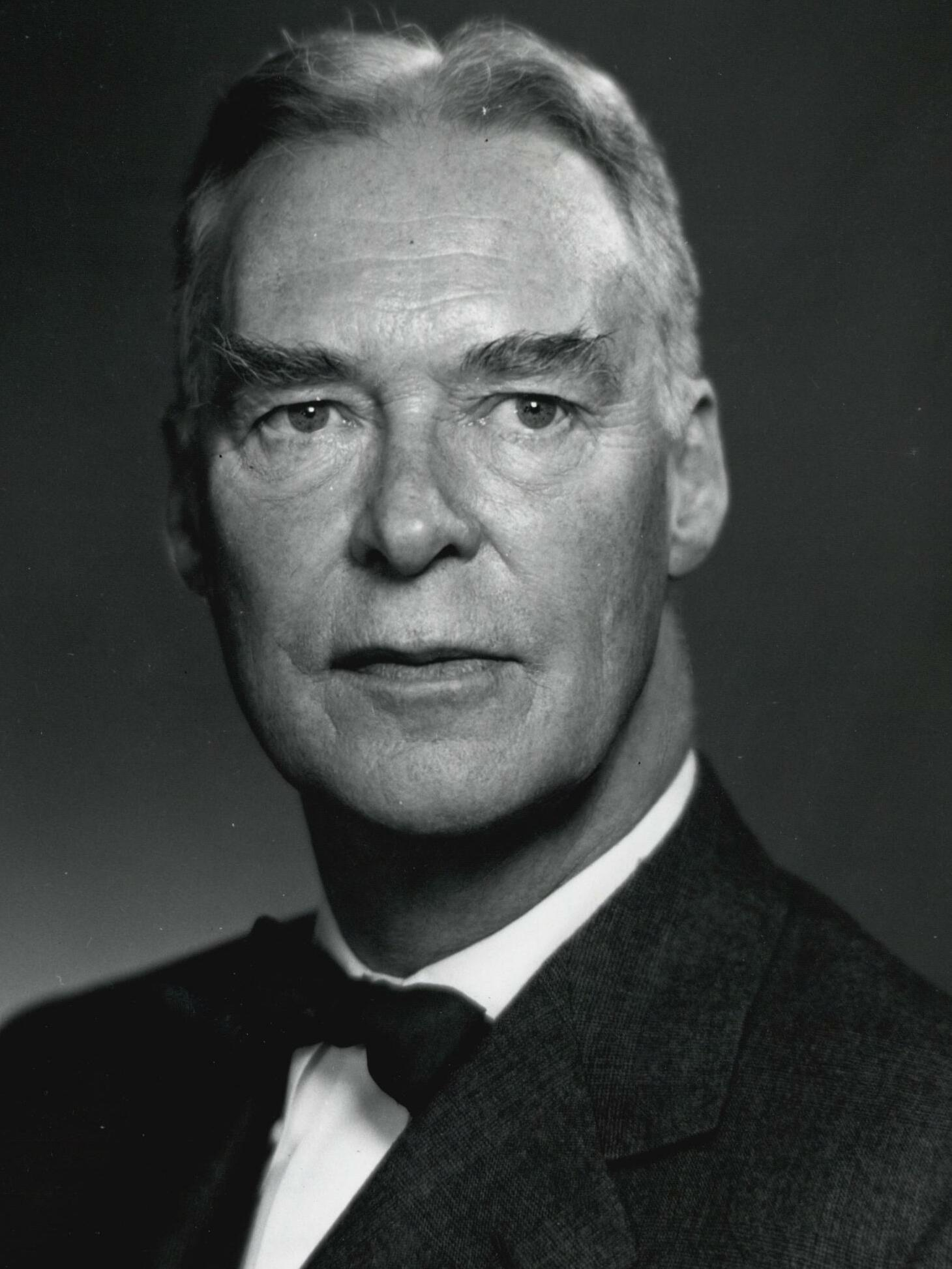

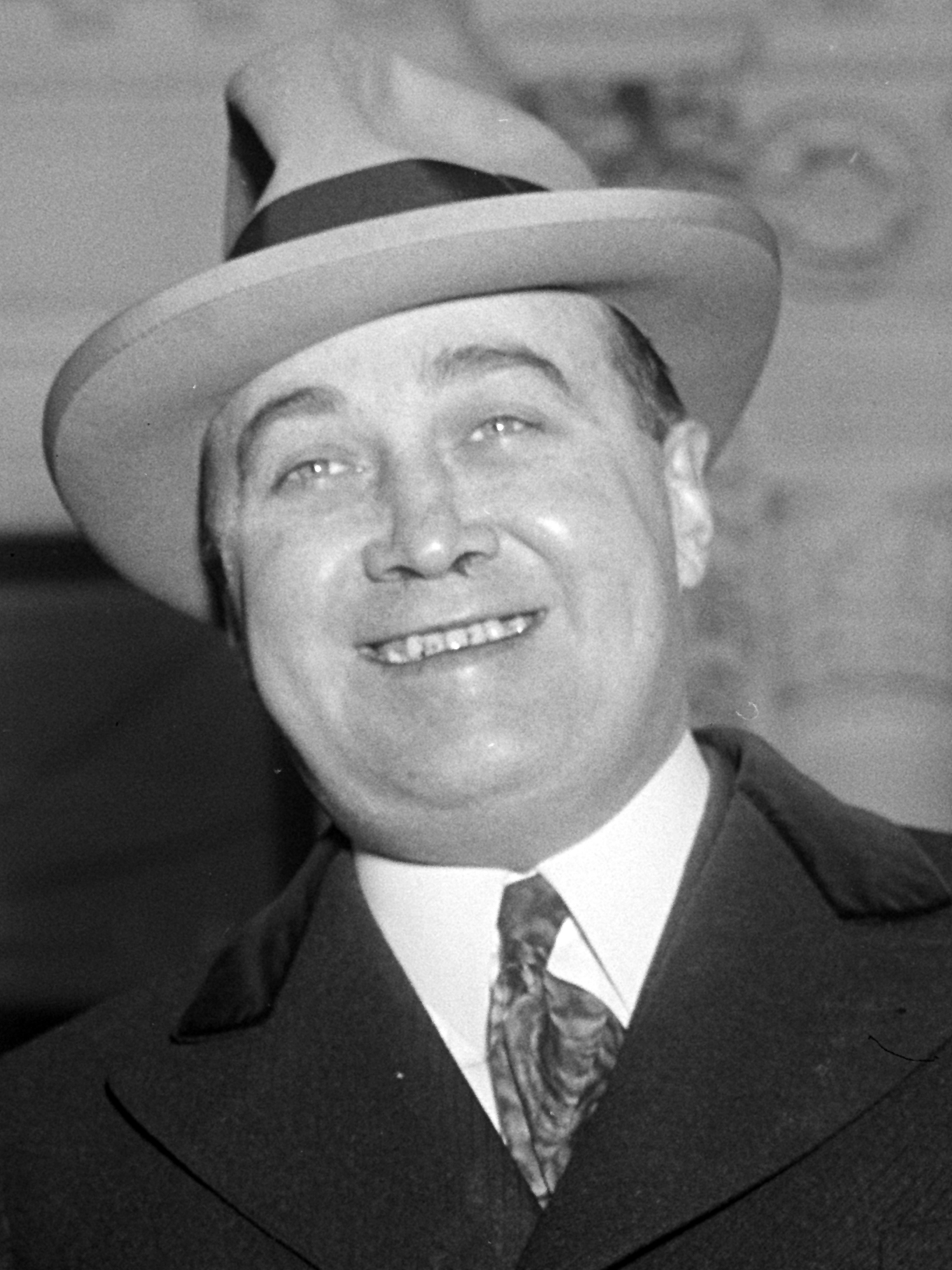
Nominee	Christian Herter	Paul A. Dever
Party	Republican	Democratic
Popular vote	1,175,955	1,161,499
Percentage	49.90%	49.29%
- Herter: 40–50% 50–60% 60–70% 70–80% 80–90% >90% Dever: 40–50% 50–60% 60–70% 70–80%
Governor before election
Paul A. Dever
Democratic
Elected Governor
Christian Herter
Republican

The 1952 Massachusetts gubernatorial election was held on November 4, 1952. Republican Christian Herter defeated Democratic incumbent Paul A. Dever, Socialist Labor candidate Lawrence Gilfedder, Peace Progressive candidate Florence H. Luscomb, and Prohibition candidate Guy S. Williams.

== Background ==
The traditional formal pre-primary convention had been abolished, and Governor Dever vetoed an attempt to reinstate it; nevertheless, Republicans announced their intent to hold an unofficial grassroots convention in Worcester on June 28.

== Democratic primary ==
=== Candidates ===
- Paul Dever, incumbent governor

=== Results ===
1952 Democratic gubernatorial primary
Party	Candidate	Votes	%
Democratic	Paul Dever (incumbent)	310,505	99.99%
Write-in		37	0.01%
Total votes		310,542	100.00%
None	Blank votes	207,074	—
Turnout		517,616	100.00%

== Republican primary ==
=== Candidates ===
- Christian Herter, U.S. representative from Boston

==== Withdrew ====
- Howe Coolidge Amee, Cambridge attorney
- Laurence Curtis, former treasurer and receiver-general and nominee for lieutenant governor in 1950 (endorsed Herter and ran for U.S. House)
- Charles Gibbons, state representative from Stoneham and House minority leader

==== Declined ====
- Sumner Whittier, state senator from Everett (ran for lieutenant governor)

=== Campaign ===
The Republican primary was largely over before it began; the establishment cleared the field in favor of U.S. Representative Christian Herter.

In February, Laurence Curtis announced his candidacy, calling for a "wholesale cleanup of conditions at the State House that have destroyed the hope of a square deal for Massachusetts citizens." He had been the leading Republican vote-getter in 1950.

At the same time, U.S. Representative Christian Herter, vacationing in South Carolina, let it be known that he was willing to accept a draft for governor. It was apparent that Herter, who supported Dwight D. Eisenhower for president, would have the support of the liberal Republican establishment, including Henry Cabot Lodge Jr., Leverett Saltonstall, Joseph W. Martin, and Sinclair Weeks. He announced his own candidacy two days after Curtis. Curtis pledged to remain in the race through the convention until the primary. However, he soon withdrew and endorsed Herter; Curtis was later elected to succeed Herter in Congress. Another potential candidate, Sumner Whittier, also immediately endorsed Herter and announced his campaign for lieutenant governor instead. Charles Gibbons initially said he would enter the race against Herter, but deferred until after the presidential primary, in which Herter was a candidate for delegate on the Eisenhower slate.

Herter spent much of the pre-convention period stumping for Eisenhower rather than his own candidacy. Even in appearances in the Commonwealth, he touted the presidential race to voters.

In early March, Cambridge attorney Howe Coolidge Amee entered the race, stating that he would refuse to abide by the pre-primary convention and would enter the primary directly. He framed his candidacy as merely a "protest against the scandalous and unconscionable measures employed by the hierarchy of my party in undertaking to foist upon us a candidate they must know cannot possibly be elected in November."

=== Results ===
1952 Republican gubernatorial primary
Party	Candidate	Votes	%
Republican	Christian Herter	389,335	99.99%
Write-in		20	0.01%
Total votes		389,355	100.00%
None	Blank votes	53,609	—
Turnout		442,964	100.00%

== General election ==
=== Candidates ===
- Paul Dever, incumbent governor (Democratic)
- Lawrence Gilfedder (Socialist Labor)
- Christian Herter, U.S. representative from Boston (Republican)
- Florence H. Luscomb, architect and suffragette (Peace Progressive)
- Guy S. Williams (Prohibition)

=== Results ===
1952 Massachusetts gubernatorial election
Party	Candidate	Votes	%	±%
Republican	Christian Herter	1,175,955	49.90%	
Democratic	Paul A. Dever (incumbent)	1,161,499	49.29%	
Peace Progressive	Florence H. Luscomb	7,502	0.32%	
Socialist Labor	Lawrence Gilfedder	6,159	0.26%	
Prohibition	Guy S. Williams	5,163	0.22%	

== See also ==
- 1951–1952 Massachusetts legislature
