= Edward Butterworth =

American lawyer and politician

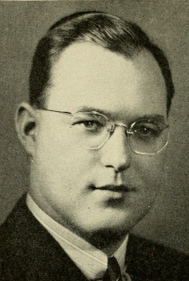

Member of the Massachusetts House of Representatives from the 12th Essex district
- In office January 1943 – January 1947
- Preceded by: Richard J. White
- Succeeded by: Frank E. Boot

Personal details
- Born: Edward Robert Butterworth; August 14, 1908 Lynn, Massachusetts, US
- Died: September 7, 1984 (aged 76) Burlington, Massachusetts, US
- Party: Republican
- Spouse: Elizabeth Learned
- Children: 5
- Education: Dartmouth College (AB); Boston College (JD)

Edward Robert Butterworth (August 14, 1908 – September 7, 1984) was an American lawyer and politician.

== Early life ==
Butterworth was born on August 14, 1908, in Lynn, Massachusetts. He graduated from Lynn Classical High School in 1925, Dartmouth College in 1930, and Boston College Law School in 1934.

== Political career ==
Butterworth began his political career as a member of the Nahant, Massachusetts, school committee. From 1943 to 1947 he represented the 12th Essex District in the Massachusetts House of Representatives. In 1950 he was a candidate for Massachusetts Attorney General. He finished third in the Republican primary behind Frederick Ayer Jr. and George Fingold.

== Legal career ==
Butterworth practiced law for 50 years. He founded the law firm of Butterworth and Palleschi, which was based in Lynn, and also practiced law in Barnstable County, Massachusetts, while he was a summer resident of New Seabury, Massachusetts. Butterworth died on September 7, 1984, in Burlington, Massachusetts.

== See also ==
- 1943–1944 Massachusetts legislature
- 1945–1946 Massachusetts legislature
