= 1966 Massachusetts gubernatorial election =

- November 8, 1966
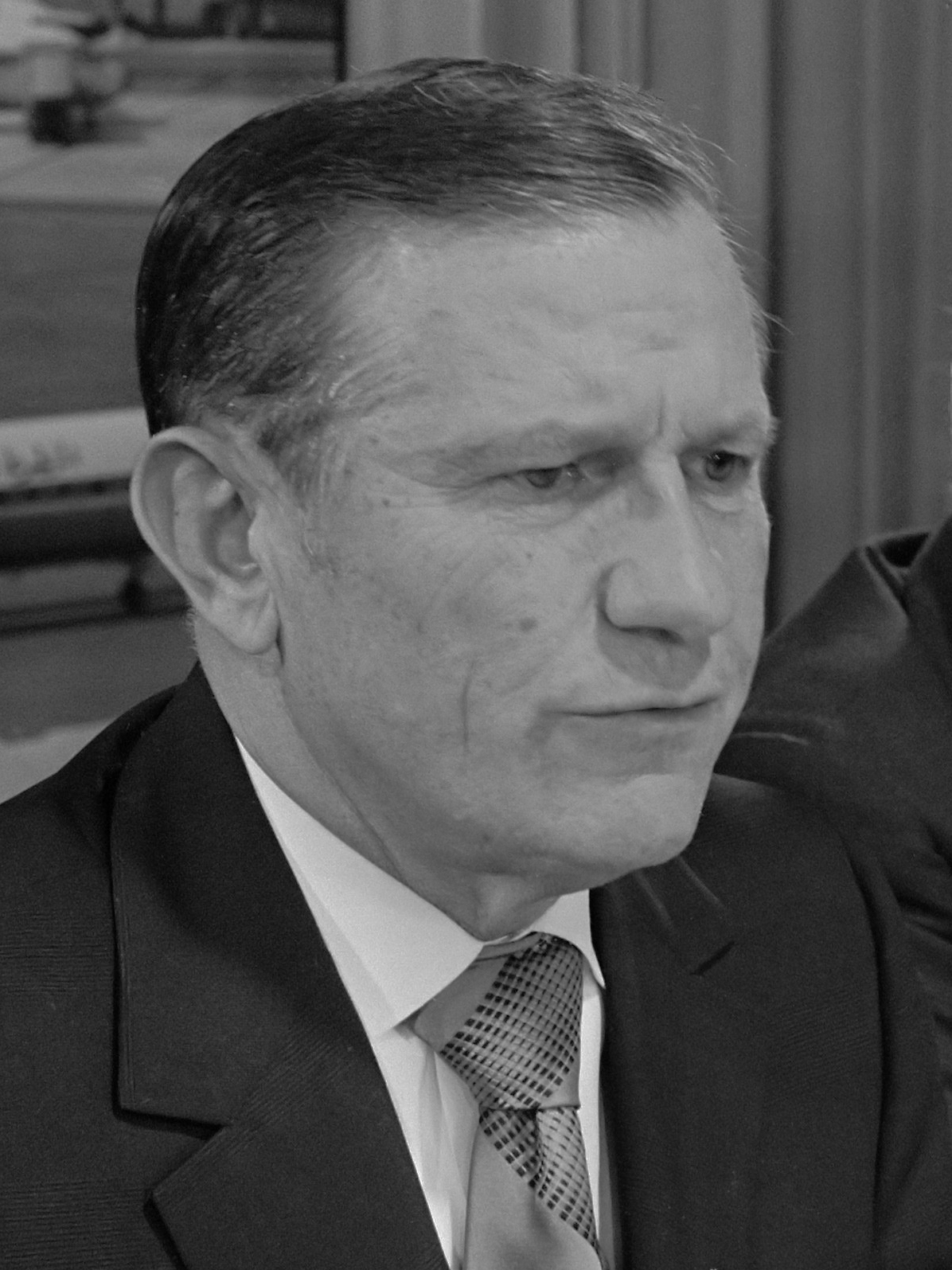

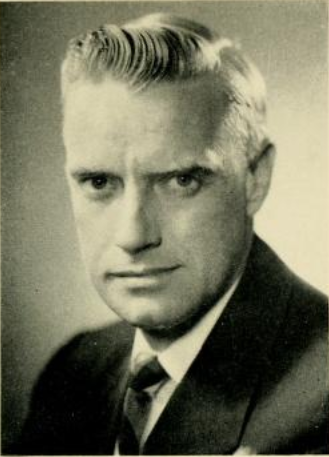
Nominee	John Volpe	Edward McCormack Jr.
Party	Republican	Democratic
Popular vote	1,277,358	752,720
Percentage	62.58%	36.88%
- Volpe: 50–60% 60–70% 70–80% 80–90% McCormack: 50–60% 60–70%
Governor before election
John Volpe
Republican
Elected Governor
John Volpe
Republican

The 1966 Massachusetts gubernatorial election was held on November 8, 1966. Governor John A. Volpe was reelected to a four-year term. He defeated former Attorney General Edward J. McCormack Jr. in the general election. This was the first election held since the governor's term of office was extended from two to four years.

== Republican primary ==
=== Candidates ===
- John Volpe, incumbent governor

=== Results ===
Governor Volpe was unopposed for renomination.

== Democratic primary ==
=== Candidates ===
- Edward J. McCormack Jr., former Massachusetts attorney general
- Kenneth O'Donnell, former aide to President Kennedy

=== Results ===
1966 Massachusetts Democratic gubernatorial primary
Party	Candidate	Votes	%
Democratic	Edward J. McCormack Jr.	343,381	55.12%
Democratic	Kenneth O'Donnell	279,541	44.87%
Write-in	All others	97	0.00%
Total votes		623,019	100.00%

== General election ==
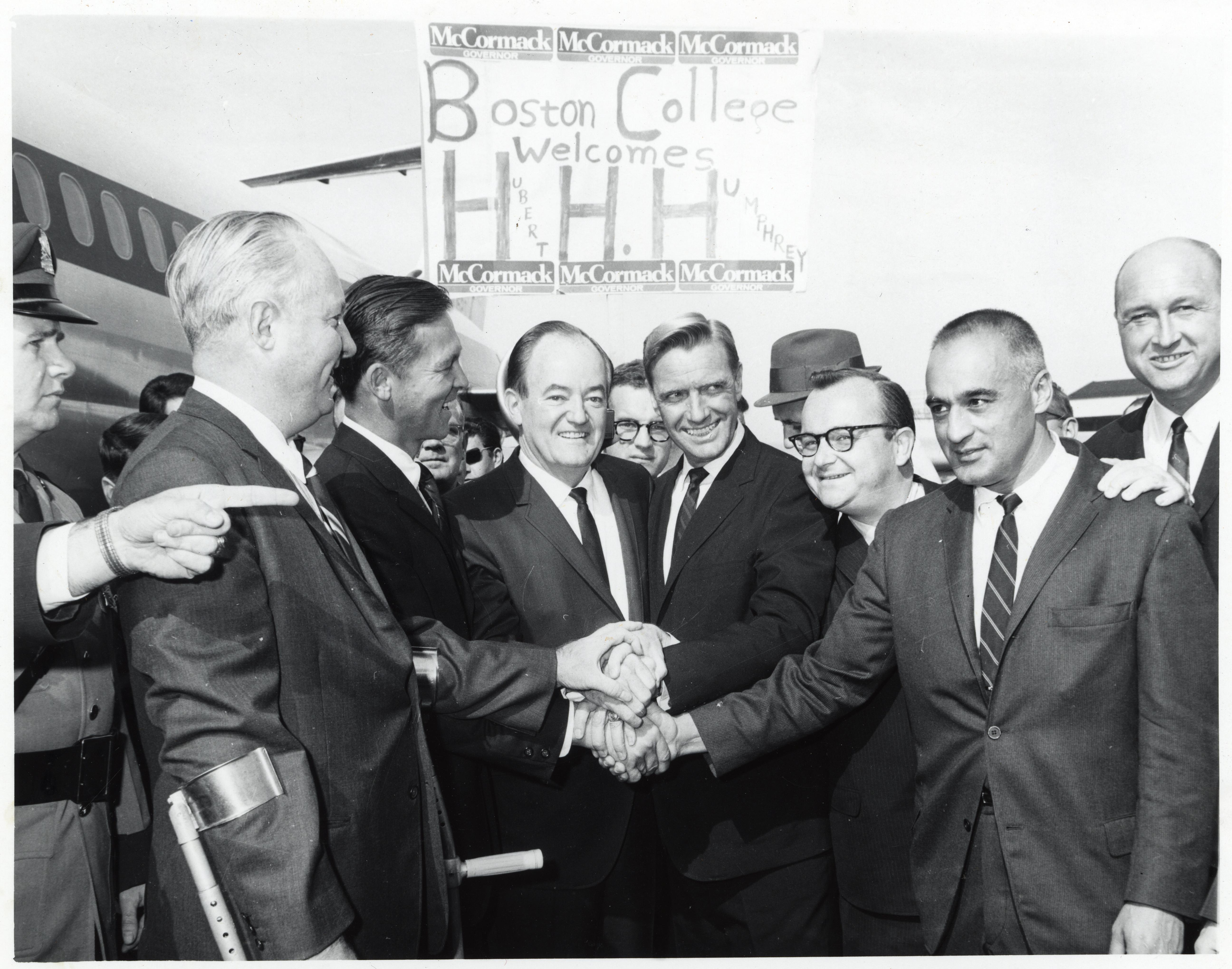
McCormack campaigning with Vice President Hubert H. Humphrey

=== Results ===
Volpe defeated McCormack by over a half million votes. He won the majority of the votes in every Massachusetts county. This was the last general election in which the governor and lieutenant governor were elected separately.

1966 Massachusetts gubernatorial election
Party	Candidate	Votes	%	±%
Republican	John A. Volpe (incumbent)	1,277,358	62.58%	
Democratic	Edward J. McCormack, Jr.	752,720	36.88%	
Socialist Labor	Henning A. Blomen	6,539	0.32%	
Prohibition	John C. Hedges	4,494	0.22%	
Write-in	All others	66	0.00%	

==== Results by county ====
County	John Volpe Republican		Edward McCormack Democratic		All others		Margin		Total votes
County	#	%	#	%	#	%	#	%	Total votes
Barnstable	25,471	75.3%	8,232	24.3%	127	0.4%	17,239	41.0%	33,830
Berkshire	33,098	64.4%	18,024	35.1%	284	0.5%	15,074	29.3%	51,406
Bristol	87,629	54.6%	72,140	45.0%	715	0.4%	15,489	9.6%	160,484
Dukes	1,846	71.4%	726	28.1%	13	0.5%	1,120	43.3%	2,585
Essex	156,070	62.5%	92,278	36.9%	1,390	0.6%	63,792	25.6%	249,738
Franklin	14,600	69.9%	6,195	29.7%	83	0.4%	8,405	40.2%	20,878
Hampden	89,263	62.2%	53,042	37.0%	1,167	0.8%	36,221	25.2%	143,472
Hampshire	23,766	61.7%	14,570	37.8%	162	0.4%	9,196	23.9%	34,498
Middlesex	332,958	65.2%	175,185	34.3%	2,596	0.5%	157,773	30.9%	510,739
Nantucket	942	71.4%	370	28.0%	8	0.6%	572	43.4%	1,320
Norfolk	157,988	67.4%	75,106	32.1%	1,193	0.5%	82,882	35.3%	234,287
Plymouth	75,501	69.3%	33,082	30.3%	419	0.4%	42,419	39.0%	109,002
Suffolk	131,375	52.6%	116,304	46.6%	2,078	0.8%	15,071	6.0%	249,757
Worcester	146,851	62.4%	87,466	37.2%	864	0.3%	59,385	25.2%	235,181
Totals	1,277,358	62.6%	752,720	36.9%	11,099	0.5%	524,638	25.7%	2,041,177

Counties that flipped from Democratic to Republican

- Bristol
- Essex
- Hampden
- Suffolk
- Worcester

== See also ==
- 1966 Massachusetts general election
- 1965–1966 Massachusetts legislature
