= Isadore H. Y. Muchnick =

American politician

Chairman of the Boston School Committee
- In office 1952–1952
- Preceded by: Kathleen Ryan Dacey
- Succeeded by: Alice M. Lyons

Member of the Boston School Committee
- In office 1948–1953

Member of the Boston City Council from Ward 14
- In office 1942–1947
- Preceded by: Joseph J. Gottlieb
- Succeeded by: Julius Ansel

Personal details
- Born: January 11, 1908 Boston, Massachusetts, U.S.
- Died: September 15, 1963 (aged 55) Boston, Massachusetts, U.S.
- Party: Democratic
- Education: Harvard College; Harvard Law School
- Occupation: Attorney

Isadore Harry Yaver Muchnick (January 11, 1908 – September 15, 1963) was an American politician who served as a member of the Boston City Council from 1942 to 1947 and the Boston School Committee from 1948 to 1953.

== Early life ==
Muchnick was born on January 11, 1908, in Boston's West End to Russian-Jewish immigrant parents Joseph and Fannie Muchnick. He graduated from Boston Latin School, Harvard College (class of 1928), and Harvard Law School (class of 1932). He began practicing law in 1932. Muchnick was a member of the Zionist Organization of America's national administrative council, secretary of the New England Zionist Region, and president of the Dorchester Zionist District. In 1936 he married Ann Zussman of Brighton. They had one son and one daughter.

== Boston City Council ==
In 1942, Ward 14 city councilor Joseph J. Gottlieb resigned to become an assistant United States attorney and Muchnick defeated former councilor Sidney Rosenberg and five others in the special election to complete his term. In 1944, Muchnick voted against granting the Boston Red Sox and Boston Braves licenses to play on Sunday (an exemption from Boston's blue laws) due to their resistance to racial integration. In 1945, he wrote to Red Sox owner Tom Yawkey that unless "all players, regardless of race, color or creed, will be treated in the American way and will be afforded an equal opportunity for positions on your team", that he would oppose the Sunday license for that year as well. As a result, Red Sox general manager Eddie Collins agreed to give some African-American baseball players a tryout. Muchnick arranged a date with Collins and had Pittsburgh Courier sportswriter Wendell Smith send three players – Jackie Robinson, Sam Jethroe, and Marvin Williams to Fenway Park. None of the players were offered a contract because at the time, the Red Sox had no plans to integrate their roster. Muchnick also contacted John Quinn of the Braves, but he refused to tryout the players.

== Boston School Committee ==
In 1947, Muchnick decided to run for a seat on the Boston School Committee instead of reelection to the council. He, along with Joseph C. White, and Daniel H. McDevitt, received the endorsement of the Boston Teachers Alliance and all three were elected. During his tenure on the board, Muchnick supported the removal of political favoritism from the school department's hiring and promotion process, consolidation of schools and school districts, the establishment of a single pay schedule for teachers in all grades, and not filling unnecessary non-academic positions. In 1952 he served as chairman of the board. In 1953, Muchnick was defeated for reelection when he finished ninth in an election where the top five vote getters were elected.

== Bids for other office ==
In 1950, Muchnick challenged incumbent Francis E. Kelly for the Democratic nomination for Massachusetts Attorney General. He received 16% the vote in the Democratic primary to Kelly's 77%. In 1952, Muchnick sought the Democratic nomination for the United States House of Representatives seat in Massachusetts's 10th congressional district. He lost the Democratic primary to Frederick C. Haller Jr. 37% to 24%. He ran for the seat again in 1954, however, he dropped out of the race so the remaining Democratic candidate, Jackson J. Holtz, could focus on the general election. Holtz lost to Republican incumbent Laurence Curtis 51% to 49%.

== Legal career ==
Muchnick served as an attorney for The Boston Post publisher John Fox, who faced a number of legal issues following the collapse of the newspaper. During the case, Muchnick suffered a heart attack after a two-hour court hearing. In 1961, a judge ruled that Fox owed Muchnick $45,490 for legal services. Muchnick's other clients included Boston deputy mayor John A. Breen and the Boston Redevelopment Authority.

== Death ==
Muchnick died on September 15, 1963, at Baker Memorial Hospital in Boston.
