= Arthur J. B. Cartier =

American lawyer (1886–1953)

Arthur Jean Baptiste Cartier (December 29, 1886 – October 29, 1953) was an American lawyer who served as United States Marshal for the District of Massachusetts from 1947 to 1953.

== Early life ==
Cartier was born on December 29, 1886, in Biddeford, Maine to Joseph and Philomena (Loiselle) Cartier. He graduated from the University of Maine School of Law in 1909 and was admitted to the bar that year. He served as Biddeford's city solicitor for three years, but gave up the job to practice law in Fall River, Massachusetts. He was the Democratic nominee for the United States House of Representatives seat in Massachusetts's 15th congressional district in 1916, 1918, 1920, 1922, and 1924.

== Federal service ==
In 1934, Cartier was made an assistant United States attorney. He was in charge of immigration cases and represented the government when Charles Ponzi appealed his deportation. In 1947 he was appointed United States Marshal for the District of Massachusetts by President Harry S. Truman. He was confirmed by the United States Senate on December 18, 1947. He was fired by Truman's successor Dwight D. Eisenhower on March 3, 1953. Cartier vowed to fight his removal, as his term did not expire until 1956 and under the law he could only be removed for cause after a hearing before the United States Senate. He died on October 29, 1953, at Baker Memorial Hospital after a short illness.

Party political offices
Preceded by Francis M. Costello	Democratic nominee for Auditor of Massachusetts; 1919	Succeeded by Alice E. Cram
Government offices
Preceded by J. Henry Goguen	United States Marshal for the District of Massachusetts; 1947–1953	Succeeded by Robert H. Beaudreau
