= Edwin L. Olander =

American World War II flying ace and politician (1917-2008)

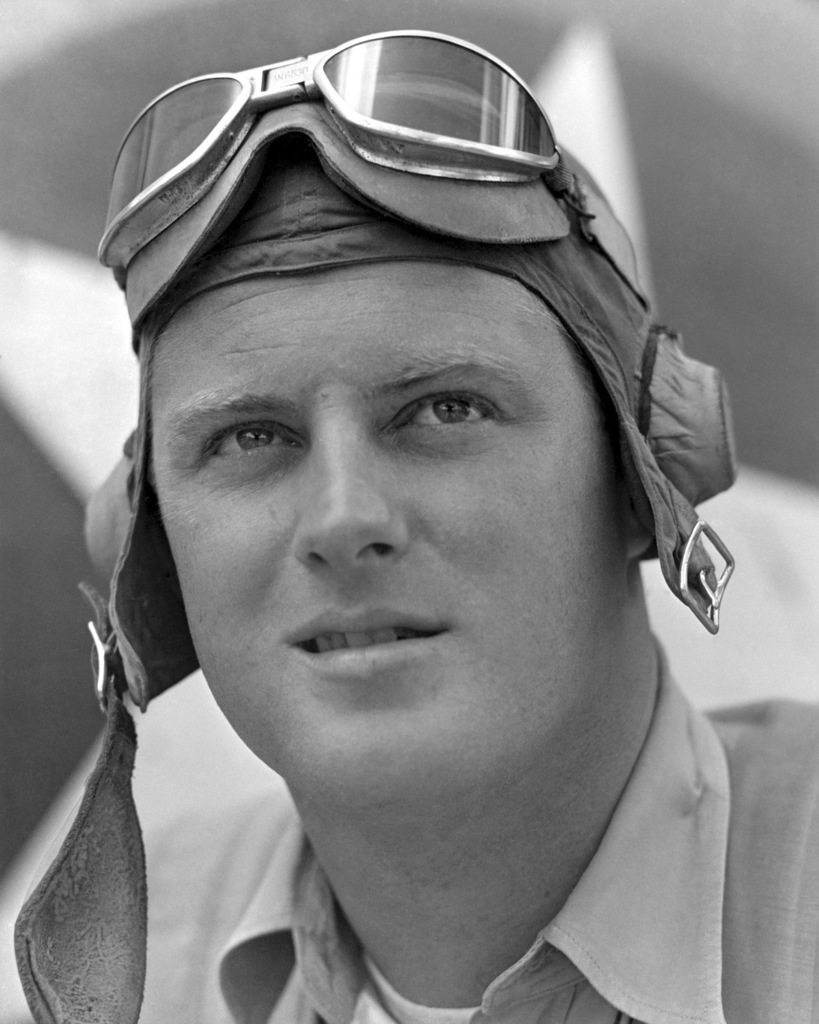

Mayor of Northampton, Massachusetts
- In office 1946–1950
- Preceded by: George B. Adler
- Succeeded by: Luke F. Ryan

Personal details
- Born: March 27, 1917 Northampton, Massachusetts
- Died: October 9, 2008 (aged 91) Northampton, Massachusetts
- Party: Republican

Military service
- Allegiance: United States
- Branch/service: United States Navy (1941); United States Marine Corps (1941–1946)
- Years of service: 1941–1946
- Rank: Captain
- Unit: VMA-214
- Awards: Distinguished Flying Cross

Edwin Lawrence Olander Jr. (March 27, 1917 – October 9, 2008) was an American World War II flying ace and politician.

== Early life ==
Olander was born on March 27, 1917, in Northampton, Massachusetts. His father, Edwin L. Olander Sr. was a railroad freight clerk who served for several years in the Massachusetts General Court. In 1934 Olander graduated from Northampton High School. He put himself through Amherst College by working as a dishwasher at his lodging house and serving on the grounds crew at Smith College during the summer. He graduated in 1938 and went to work as a correspondent for a Springfield, Massachusetts newspaper.

== U.S. Navy ==
In July 1941, Olander enlisted in the United States Navy as an aviator. He later transferred to the United States Marine Corps Aviation. He served in Col. Pappy Boyington's Black Sheep Squadron. During the Bougainville Campaign, Olander shot down three Japanese planes and was awarded the Distinguished Flying Cross. On December 30, 1943, he became an ace by shooting down his fifth plane in a strike on Rabaul. He left the service with the rank of captain.

== Political career ==
In 1939, Olander was elected to the Northampton school committee. He resigned before his term ended to enlist in the United States Navy. After the war, Olander went to work in the building material business. In 1946 ran in a special election following the death of Northampton Mayor Edmund Lampron. He defeated acting mayor George B. Adler 4,100 to 2,936. At the age of 29, Olander was the youngest mayor in the city's history. He was also Northampton's first Republican mayor since 1938. Olander led Northampton during the city's fuel shortage in the winter of 1948–49. He ordered fuel restrictions on the city's places of entertainment, churches, libraries, and the Northampton Airport. In 1948, Olander was a candidate for Massachusetts State Auditor. He lost the Republican primary to Russell A. Wood 40% to 36%. In 1949, Olander lost his reelection bid to Luke F. Ryan by 15 votes. In 1951 he was appointed to the position of deputy chairman of the Massachusetts Republican Party alongside future governor John A. Volpe, attorney Robert H. Beaudreau, and James J. Gaffney Jr.

== Later life ==
Following his defeat, Olander chose to leave politics due to his dislike for running for office. He worked as a manufacturer's representative and distributor for brick and masonry product supply companies until his retirement in 1991. He died on October 9, 2008.
