= Beatrice Hancock Mullaney =

American judge

Beatrice Hancock Mullaney (died on June 24, 1990) was an American jurist who served as the first female judge of the Massachusetts Probate Court.

== Early life ==
Mullaney was born in Fall River, Massachusetts. She graduated from the Boston University School of Law in 1928 and opened her first law office in 1929. The following year she married Joseph Mullaney, a private investigator. They had five children.

== Government service ==
In 1942, Governor Leverett Saltonstall appointed Mullaney to the position of public administrator. She was the first woman to hold this office. From 1945 to 1949 she was an assistant state attorney general, specializing in violations of the corrupt practices act as well as mental health and public welfare. In 1952 she was the Republican nominee for Secretary of the Commonwealth. She lost to Democratic incumbent Edward J. Cronin 51% to 48%. In 1953 she was elected vice chairman of the Massachusetts Republican Party. In 1955 she was appointed to the Probate Court in Bristol County, Massachusetts. She retired in 1975.

== Death ==
Mullaney fell ill during the 67th reunion of the B.M.C. Durfee High School class of 1923. She died on June 24, 1990, at St. Anne Hospital in Fall River. She was 84 years old. At the time of her death she was a resident of Westport, Massachusetts.

Party political offices
Preceded by Russell A. Wood	Republican nominee for Secretary of the Commonwealth of Massachusetts; 1952	Succeeded by Michael J. McCarthy
