= Paul V. Shaughnessy =

American politician

Mayor of Waltham, Massachusetts
- In office 1956–1958
- Preceded by: Henry A. Turner
- Succeeded by: Austin D. Rhodes

Personal details
- Died: April 7, 2001
- Party: Democratic
- Education: Northeastern University; Boston University School of Law
- Occupation: Lawyer

Paul V. Shaughnessy was an American politician who served as Mayor of Waltham, Massachusetts.

== Early life ==
Shaughnessy was a graduate of St. Mary's High School, Northeastern University, and the Boston University School of Law. During World War II, Shaughnessy served in the United States Navy.

== Political career ==
Shaughnessy began his political career in 1941 when he was elected to the Waltham School Committee. He was the youngest person ever elected to the position.

In 1947, 1949, 1951, and 1953, Shaughnessy was an unsuccessful candidate for Mayor of Waltham. In 1950 he finished third in the Democratic primary for Massachusetts Secretary of the Commonwealth. In 1952 he was an unsuccessful candidate for the Democratic nomination for Southern Middlesex Registrar of Deeds. In 1954 he ran for Middlesex County District Attorney. He lost the Democratic primary to Joseph V. Carroll 23,289 votes to 23,093.

In 1955, Shaughnessy defeated incumbent Henry A. Turner to become Mayor of Waltham. During his tenure, Shaughnessy fired several city officials, clashed with the city council, banned government employees from leaving City Hall for coffee breaks, and commandeered the police chief's car after the city council refused to appropriate funds for a new mayoral vehicle. Elected the age of 36, he was the youngest Mayor in the city's history. He was succeeded by the city's oldest mayor, Austin D. Rhodes, after the 72 year old retired business executive defeated Shaughnessy in 1957.

In 1958, Shaughnessy was appointed to the Massachusetts Alcoholic Beverage Control Commission by Governor Foster Furcolo. In 1959, Peabody Mayor Philip C. O'Donnell was appointed to succeed Shaughnessy. According to Furcolo's office, Shaughnessy resigned from the position on November 15, 1958. Shaughnessy, however, contended he was forced to sign a letter of resignation before he could receive the appointment and therefore his resignation was invalid. State Attorney General Edward J. McCormack advised the Massachusetts Governor's Council that "there is a presumption of regularity that in fact a resignation was submitted by Shaughnessy and acted upon by the governor" and the Council approved O'Donnell's nomination.

In 1962, he was appointed legal adviser to the Federal Housing Administration in New England and New York by President John F. Kennedy. In 1965 he was an unsuccessful candidate for Mayor of Waltham.

Shaughnessy died on April 7, 2001.
