= William F. Carr =

American politician (1910–1998)

- official portrait photograph, 1949

Chairman of the Boston School Committee
- In office 1954–1954
- Preceded by: Alice M. Lyons
- Succeeded by: Mary K. Fitzgerald

Member of the Massachusetts House of Representatives from the 7th Suffolk District
- In office 1949–1953
- Preceded by: Richard A. Kelly
- Succeeded by: Joe Moakley

Personal details
- Born: August 4, 1910 South Boston, Massachusetts, U.S.
- Died: October 31, 1998 (aged 88) South Boston, Massachusetts, U.S.
- Party: Democratic
- Education: Boston College; Boston Teachers College

William F. Carr (August 4, 1910 – October 31, 1998) was an American politician who served as a member of the Massachusetts House of Representatives and Boston School Committee.

== Early life ==
Carr was born on August 4, 1910, in South Boston. He graduated from South Boston High School and Boston College and later earned a master's in education from Boston Teachers College. During World War II, Carr served with the 45th Infantry Division. He earned five battle stars for action in Sicily, Italy, Southern France, and Germany. After the war, Carr worked in the transportation industry.

== Political career ==
From 1949 to 1953, Carr represented the 7th Suffolk District in the Massachusetts House of Representatives. In 1951 he was elected to the Boston School Committee. He was reelected in 1953 and was named chairman of the board. In 1954, Carr was a candidate for State Treasurer. He finished a close third in the Democratic primary behind John Francis Kennedy and Clement A. Riley. He was reelected to the school committee again in 1955, finishing ahead of every other candidate. In 1956 he ran for Sheriff of Suffolk County. He finished behind incumbent Frederick R. Sullivan and Joseph C. White in a twelve candidate Democratic primary. Carr's tenure on the school committee ended following the 1957 election when he finished in eighth place.

== Later life ==
After his political career ended, Carr served as executive secretary of the Suffolk County Registry of Deeds, ran a flower business, and worked at Wonderland Greyhound Park. He died on October 31, 1998, in South Boston.

== See also ==
- 1949–1950 Massachusetts legislature
- 1951–1952 Massachusetts legislature
