= Edwin W. Hadley =

American law professor

Edwin W. Hadley (died 1977) was an American law professor at the University of Wyoming College of Law, Notre Dame Law School, Boston University School of Law, and Northeastern University School of Law.

== Early life ==
Hadley was born in San Diego, California. He graduated from Stanford University in 1920 and Stanford University Law School in 1923. While at Stanford, Hadley was a member of the school's football team.

== Academic career ==
In 1923, Hadley became an assistant professor at the University of Wyoming College of Law. From 1924 to 1927 he taught Equity, Trusts, and Quasi-Contracts at the Notre Dame Law School. He was also coach of the Notre Dame Fighting Irish freshman football team. In 1929 he earned a master of law degree from Harvard Law School. That fall he joined the faculty at the Boston University School of Law. He was an instructor in legal history, mortgages, and bankruptcy law as well as a member of the school's athletic council. During the summer of 1931 he taught political science, constitutional history, and comparative history of social history at San Diego State Teacher's College. From 1931 to 1956, Hadley taught at Northeastern University School of Law. In 1968 the University established a professorship of law in his name.

== Political involvement ==
Hadley served as the president of New England Anti-Gambling Association, an organization created to oppose the legalization of parimutuel betting and other forms of gambling in Massachusetts, and the Anti-Vivisection Society of America, which opposed the use of animals in medical research.

In 1941, Hadley served as a constitutional advisor on emergency war legislation for the Commonwealth of Massachusetts. From 1943 to 1944 he was a member of the Massachusetts Commission of Administrative Court. During World War II, Hadley served in the United States Army, where he rose from the rank of private to major. In 1950 he was a candidate for Massachusetts Attorney General. He finished fourth in the Republican primary with 11% of the vote.

== Later life ==
Hadley continued to practice law until his retirement in 1974. He died on April 11, 1977, in Morelia. He was 79 years old.
