= Frederick Ayer Jr. =

American government official, attorney, and author (1915–1974)

- Born: December 28, 1915; Topsfield, Massachusetts, U.S.
- Died: January 4, 1974 (aged 58)
- Occupations: government official, attorney, and author
- Relatives: George S. Patton IV (cousin); Frederick Ayer (grandfather)

Frederick Ayer Jr. (December 28, 1915 – January 4, 1974) was an American government official, attorney, and author who worked for the Federal Bureau of Investigation, the United States Mission in Greece, and the United States Air Force.

== Early life ==
Ayer was born on December 28, 1915, in Topsfield, Massachusetts, to Frederick Ayer Sr. and Hilda Proctor Rice Ayer. His uncle was General George S. Patton and his grandfather was Frederick Ayer.

Ayer grew up in Wenham, Massachusetts. He graduated from The Hill School in 1933, Harvard College in 1937, and Harvard Law School in 1941. While an undergraduate, Ayer was a member of Harvard's varsity polo and track and junior varsity football and rifle teams. On November 16, 1941, he married Anne Proctor Moody of San Francisco in Hamilton, Massachusetts. They had two sons and one daughter.

== Government service ==
From 1941 to 1946, Ayer was an agent with the Federal Bureau of Investigation. He was sworn in on August 25, 1941, placed in an accelerated training program, and assigned to the Washington, D.C., field office. One of his first targets was Inga Arvad, whom FBI Director J. Edgar Hoover believed could be a German spy. On his first ever technical surveillance operation, Ayer discovered that Arvad was romantically involved with one of his Harvard classmates, John F. Kennedy, then an ensign in the US Navy's Office of Naval Intelligence. The discovery of Kennedy's involvement with a married woman led to him being transferred to Charleston, South Carolina, where he had little access to classified materials and increased surveillance on Arvad. Ayer was later assigned to the Boston and Cincinnati field offices and during World War II was loaned to the United States Army for a special assignment in Europe. He was eventually appointed chief of the FBI Liaison Units in the European Theater of Operations.

From 1947 to 1948, Ayer worked at the American Mission in Greece as deputy legal advisor. He later as the chief of the mission's Intelligence and Security Division, where he was tasked with stopping Communist activities in relation to the American aid program. In 1948, United States Secretary of State George C. Marshall assigned Ayer to assist Maj. Gen. William J. Donovan in the investigation of CBS reporter George Polk's murder. According to the New York Times Ayer was "credited with laying the groundwork for the inquiry that led to the solution of the case".

In April 1950, Ayer was named assistant counsel to the Tydings Committee, a United States Senate Committee on Foreign Relations subcommittee investigating alleged communism in the State Department on the recommendation of Senators Henry Cabot Lodge Jr. and Bourke B. Hickenlooper. His appointment was held up by Chairman Millard E. Tydings, after Tydings, who did not believe candidates for office should serve as members of the committee's staff, found out Ayer was running for Attorney General of Massachusetts. Tydings soon withdrew his objection, but Ayer declined the post, stating that he did feel he the "full confidence of the committee" due to the chairman's objections.

== Fundraising ==
In 1948, Ayer accepted an unpaid position as vice-chairman of the Boston Children's Hospital's Children's Medical Center Fund. The following year he was named chairman of the fund. At the age of 33 he was believed to be the youngest chairman of a major charitable campaign in Massachusetts history. In 1951 he served as general chairman of the YMCA's World Service Campaign.

== Political career ==
Ayer was encouraged to enter politics by his uncle, George S. Patton, who told him that too many qualified people avoided politics because they thought it was a "dirty business". He was active in Leverett Saltonstall's 1936 campaign for Governor of Massachusetts and took two months off from law school to assist Wendell Willkie's presidential campaign. In 1948, Ayer served as vice chairman and later as acting chairman of the Massachusetts Republican Party's Finance Committee.

On March 15, 1950, Ayer announced his candidacy for Attorney General of Massachusetts. He ran on a platform of fighting crime and combating "Communist infiltration and agitation". He supported the creation of a state school for police officers similar to the FBI National Academy in Washington, D.C., stricter enforcement of fire codes, higher pay for police officers, higher standards for doctors, and an anti-pollution program. Ayer defeated 4 other candidates, including future Attorney General George Fingold, to win the Republican primary. During the campaign, Ayer criticized Democratic incumbent Francis E. Kelly for his handling of the Brinks robbery while Kelly described Ayer as a "10 month lawyer who has never tried a law case". Ayer lost to Kelly 52% to 47%, but received more votes than any other Republican candidate, including gubernatorial nominee Arthur W. Coolidge. In 1952, Ayer again ran for attorney general, but lost the Republican nomination to George Fingold. Following his defeat, Ayer served as vice president of the Massachusetts Citizens for Eisenhower committee.

== Later life ==
In 1953 Ayer was named special assistant to United States Secretary of the Air Force Harold E. Talbott. On April 22, 1955, Ayer suffered a heart attack in Washington, D.C. He eventually recovered and returned to work. After leaving government service in 1960, Ayer practiced law in Washington, D.C., with the firm of Ford, Ayer, Horan, and Lester. He also dedicated much of his time to writing. His books included "Before the Color Fades: Portrait of a Soldier" about his uncle George S. Patton, "The Man in the Mirror: A Novel of Espionage", "Yankee G-Men", and "Walter, the Improbable Hound." In 1965 he appeared as a guest on The Merv Griffin Show. He also wrote articles for Massachusetts newspapers, including The Boston Globe on a number of subjects, chiefly European affairs. Ayer died of a heart attack on January 4, 1974, while on vacation in Tucker's Town, Bermuda.

Party political offices
Preceded by Clarence A. Barnes	Republican nominee for Attorney General of Massachusetts; 1950	Succeeded by George Fingold
