= Robert H. Beaudreau =

American attorney and jurist (1912–1980)

United States Marshal for the District of Massachusetts
- In office 1953–1956
- Preceded by: Arthur J. B. Cartier
- Succeeded by: Ralph W. Gray

Personal details
- Born: 1912 Marlborough, Massachusetts, U.S.
- Died: October 3, 1980 (aged 67) Marlborough, Massachusetts, U.S.
- Party: Republican
- Education: College of the Holy Cross; Harvard University (BA, LLB)

Military service
- Branch/service: United States Coast Guard
- Battles/wars: World War II

Robert Henry Beaudreau (1912 – 1980) was an American attorney and jurist who served as a Massachusetts Superior Court judge.

== Early life and education ==
Beaudreau was born in 1912 in Marlborough, Massachusetts, to Superior Court Judge Raoul H. Beaudreau and Sarah H. (Rogers) Beaudreau. He graduated from Marlborough High School in 1931 and went on to attend the College of the Holy Cross. In 1932 he transferred to Harvard College, where he was an end on the varsity football team during his senior year. He graduated from Harvard College in 1935 and Harvard Law School in 1938.

== Career ==
In 1938, Middlesex District Attorney-elect Robert F. Bradford appointed Beaudreau to the position of list clerk, a job that held responsibilities similar to an office manager. In 1941, he left the district attorney's office to become a special agent for the Federal Bureau of Investigation. Fluent in French, Beaudreau was assigned to Louisiana. He also worked for the FBI in Washington, D.C., and New York City.

From 1942 to 1946, Beaudreau was a member of the United States Coast Guard. He served in both the European and Pacific theaters and was discharged with the rank of lieutenant.

After World War II, Beaudreau worked as a trial attorney and opened law offices in Boston and Marlborough. Most of his work was civil and he represented a number of Boston taxi companies. In 1951 he was appointed to the position of deputy chairman of the Massachusetts Republican Party alongside future Governor John A. Volpe, Northampton, Massachusetts Mayor Edwin L. Olander and James J. Gaffney Jr. In 1953 he was appointed United States Marshal for Massachusetts. He resigned in 1956 to run for State Treasurer. He lost to Democrat John Francis Kennedy 53% to 46%.

In 1961, Governor Volpe nominated Beaudreau to the position of state public safety commissioner. However, the all-Democratic Massachusetts Governor's Council refused to act on the nomination and after four months of waiting, Beaudreau withdrew his name, stating that he was "the victim of a political plot of obstruction." Instead, the council approved Beaudreau's nomination for a seat on the Industrial Accident Board later that year. In 1962 he was nominated for a seat on the Massachusetts Superior Court. He remained on the bench until his death on October 3, 1980, from cancer.

Party political offices
Preceded by Augustus Gardner Means	Republican nominee for Treasurer and Receiver-General of Massachusetts; 1956	Succeeded by John Yerxa
