= Edward J. McCormack Jr. =

American lawyer and politician (1923-1997)

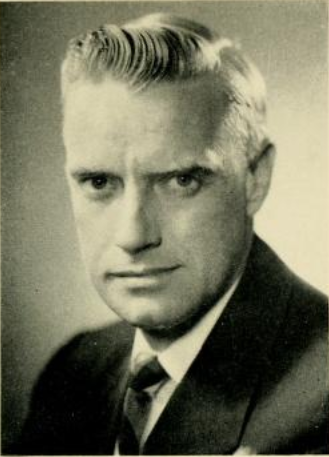

34th Attorney General of Massachusetts
- In office September 11, 1958 – January 3, 1963
- Governor: Foster Furcolo; John Volpe
- Preceded by: George Fingold
- Succeeded by: Edward Brooke

Personal details
- Born: Edward Joseph McCormack Jr. August 29, 1923 Boston, Massachusetts, U.S.
- Died: February 27, 1997 (aged 73) Boston, Massachusetts, U.S.
- Party: Democratic
- Relatives: John W. McCormack (uncle)
- Education: United States Naval Academy Boston University School of Law
- Profession: Lawyer

Edward Joseph McCormack Jr. (August 29, 1923 – February 27, 1997), was an American attorney and politician from Massachusetts. He was most notable for serving as Massachusetts Attorney General from 1959 through 1963.

== Personal life and education ==
A member of an influential political family of Irish descent, McCormack was a son of Edward Joseph "Knocko" McCormack Sr., a prominent Boston political figure, and a nephew of John W. McCormack, who became Speaker of the United States House of Representatives. McCormack when young was described as tall and handsome, with dark blond hair.

McCormack attended Colby College before becoming a student at the United States Naval Academy, from which he graduated in 1947. Because of the prejudice he faced in Boston as a Catholic of Irish descent, he became well known among his classmates for his efforts to fight discrimination against black and Jewish midshipmen. After brief Navy service, McCormack resigned his commission. He then attended Boston University School of Law, and graduated first in the class of 1952.

== Politics ==
McCormack won election to the Boston City Council in 1953 and 1955, and served as council president beginning in 1956. In 1956, he was the unsuccessful Democratic nominee for attorney general. In 1958, he ran again for attorney general. Following the death of incumbent George Fingold on August 31, 1958, the Massachusetts Legislature met on September 5 to elect a successor, but was unable to choose. They voted to schedule another Joint Convention for the following week, after the primaries, when the Democratic-controlled legislature would know who had won the Democratic nomination, with that individual likely receiving the interim appointment.

McCormack won the primary, and on September 11, 1958, the legislature selected him to fill the vacancy. He was sworn in later the same day. He won the November election, was re-elected in 1960, and served from 1959 to 1963. His tenure was known for a strong record on civil rights.

=== Senate campaign ===
In the 1962 U.S. Senate special election in Massachusetts, McCormack faced off in the Democratic primary against Edward M. "Ted" Kennedy, who was running for the Senate seat vacated by his brother John upon becoming President of the United States. Critics said the current (appointed) senator, Ben Smith, who was a close friend of the Kennedy family, was intended all along to simply be a "seat-warmer" until Ted Kennedy turned thirty (the minimum age provided by the U.S. Constitution for eligibility to serve in the Senate). Smith initially planned to run in the special election to complete the rest of the term; however, he backed off when polls showed that he would suffer certain defeat to McCormack in the primary. Kennedy faced the notion that with brother John as president and Robert as U.S. Attorney General, "Don't you think that Teddy is one Kennedy too many?".

McCormack had the support of many liberals and intellectuals, who thought Kennedy inexperienced (Kennedy used the slogan, "He can do more for Massachusetts", the same one John had used in his first campaign for the seat ten years earlier). McCormack's staff seems to regard Kennedy's presence in the race more as an insult than a challenge, noting that McCormack had a distinguished record in academics, war service, and public office. By contrast, Kennedy had just reached the qualifying age for the Senate, and his public experience was limited to a short uneventful term as assistant District Attorney in Boston. Kennedy had also been suspended from Harvard University for academic cheating, which he admitted in a press conference in order to pre-empt McCormack supporters from making an issue of it.

Despite his public service, McCormack was largely seen as the underdog, going up against the fame and fortune of the Kennedy family political machine, which flooded the media with ads promoting Kennedy's Senate candidacy. McCormack's campaign, supervised by his father Edward, Sr., and uncle John W., could afford few radio and newspaper ads, nor a paid staff, and being forced to handle many of the campaign details caused the younger McCormack to lose seven pounds by the end of the contest. Kennedy also proved to be an effective street-level campaigner. What would further hurt McCormack's campaign was his negative attacks which were viewed by voters as overbearing and bullying. McCormack used the slogan, "I back Jack, but Teddy ain't ready", and during the televised debate, he stated, "The office of United States senator should be merited, and not inherited", and said that if his opponent's name was Edward Moore, not Edward Moore Kennedy, his candidacy "would be a joke".

Kennedy subsequently won the September 1962 primary by a two-to-one margin, and he received McCormack's support in the general election. Although pundits predicted that this contest would have caused a rift between McCormack's uncle, John W. McCormack, who was the Speaker of the House of Representatives, and Kennedy's brother President John F. Kennedy, Speaker McCormack never showed by word or deed that he bore a grudge against the Kennedys for his nephew's loss.

In the November special election, Kennedy defeated Republican George Cabot Lodge II, product of another noted Massachusetts political family, gaining 55 percent of the vote.

=== Further political activities ===
McCormack was a Massachusetts delegate to the 1964 Democratic national convention.

McCormack was the Democratic nominee for Governor of Massachusetts in 1966, when he lost to Republican incumbent John A. Volpe, the first time that the term of that office was extended from two to four years.

Known as a shrewd political broker, McCormack in 1975 was asked by U.S. District Judge W. Arthur Garrity Jr. to head planning of the implementation of the judge's desegregation order for Boston public schools. After weeks of McCormack's bargaining with stakeholders, the plan produced had broad support and eliminated busing between predominantly black Roxbury and South Boston, whose largely Irish population had fiercely resisted the initial phase of desegregation of the schools. Worried that elements of the plan would violate the civil rights of Black students, Garrity modified the plan to put South Boston and Roxbury in the same working district and nearly doubled the number of students to be bused citywide. McCormack "felt betrayed" and was "certain that the judge's remedy would ensure more violence."

== After politics ==
Although no longer in public office, he remained a political insider and worked as a development lawyer in Boston real estate, while his friend Kevin H. White was mayor of that city. McCormack had financial interests in Rowe's Wharf, Government Center Garage, Copley Place, Lafayette Place, and the Bostonian Hotel, where he made and lost hundreds of millions.

McCormack died in 1997, at age 73, of complications from lung cancer. His former political opponent Ted Kennedy, still serving at the time as Massachusetts's senior United States senator, fondly recalled their 1962 primary contest.

Party political offices
Preceded by John F. Collins	Democratic nominee for Attorney General of Massachusetts; 1956, 1958, 1960	Succeeded by Francis E. Kelly
Preceded by Francis Bellotti	Democratic nominee for Governor of Massachusetts; 1966	Succeeded by Kevin White
Legal offices
Preceded by George Fingold	Massachusetts Attorney General; 1958–1963	Succeeded by Edward Brooke
