= William B. Bailey =

American politician

Registrar of Deeds for the Southern Middlesex District
- In office 1952–1959
- Preceded by: James F. Fitzgerald
- Succeeded by: Edmund C. Buckley

Member of the Massachusetts House of Representatives for the 24th Middlesex District
- In office 1947–1949

Personal details
- Born: December 11, 1892 Somerville, Massachusetts
- Died: October 25, 1977 (aged 84) Somerville, Massachusetts
- Party: Republican
- Education: Benjamin Franklin Institute of Technology; Wentworth Institute of Technology

William B. Bailey (December 11, 1892 – October 25, 1977) was an American politician who served as Registrar of Deeds for the Southern Middlesex District and was a member of the Massachusetts House of Representatives.

== Early life ==
Bailey was born on December 11, 1892, in Somerville, Massachusetts. He attended public schools in Somerville, Benjamin Franklin Institute of Technology, and Wentworth Institute of Technology. Bailey served in the United States Army during World War I and mustered out with the rank of sergeant.

== Political career ==
From 1942 to 1945, Bailey was a member of the Somerville school committee. From 1947 to 1949 he represented the 24th Middlesex District in the Massachusetts House of Representatives. In 1947 he was an unsuccessful candidate for mayor of Somerville. In 1950 he was a candidate for Secretary of the Commonwealth. He finished fourth in the Republican primary with 15% of the vote. In 1952 Bailey defeated Democratic incumbent James F. Fitzgerald to become Registrar of Deeds for the Southern Middlesex District. In 1958, he was defeated in a reelection bid by Edmund C. Buckley. In 1962, Bailey was an unsuccessful candidate for Middlesex County commissioner. Bailey was also a member of the Somerville board of assessors for 16 years.

Bailey died on October 25, 1977, at his home in Somerville.

== See also ==
- 1947–1948 Massachusetts legislature
