= Warren G. Harris =

American politician (1913–1970)

Member of the Massachusetts Governor's Council from the 7th district
- In office 1947–1949
- Preceded by: James Marshall
- Succeeded by: John O'Brien

Personal details
- Born: April 29, 1913 Worcester, Massachusetts
- Died: November 5, 1970 (aged 57) Millbury, Massachusetts
- Party: Republican
- Education: Boston University
- Occupation: Lawyer; Insurance executive

Warren G. Harris (1913–1970) was an American politician and business executive who served as a member of the Massachusetts Governor's Council from 1947 to 1949.

== Early life ==
Harris was born on April 29, 1913, in Worcester, Massachusetts. He was raised in Millbury, Massachusetts, where his father, Warren B. Harris, was a member of the school committee. Harris attended the Boston University College of Business Administration and School of Law.

== Political career ==
In 1938, Harris was elected to the Millbury school committee. He defeated the same candidate who beat his father in 1923. Harris was reelected in 1940. In addition to serving on the school committee, Harris was also the president of the town's Republican committee and Kiwanis.

In 1942, Harris enlisted in the United States Army. He served in the Pacific, African and Middle East theaters of World War II. He left the Army with the rank of Lieutenant.

In 1946, Harris was elected to the Massachusetts Governor's Council. He was defeated for reelection in 1948 by Democrat John O'Brien.

In 1950, Harris was a candidate for Lieutenant Governor of Massachusetts. He finished fifth in the five-candidate Republican primary behind former state treasurer Laurence Curtis, businessman and future John Birch Society founder Robert W. Welch, Jr., state senator Harris S. Richardson, and former Beverly Mayor Daniel E. McLean.

== Business career and personal life ==
Harris owned two insurance firms, with offices in Millbury and Worcester.

During the late 1940s, he held three world records in speedboat racing.

== Death ==
Around 10 pm on November 5, 1970, a fire broke out at Harris' home. Fire officials were unable to enter the home for over an hour. Harris' body was identified by dental records.
