= George Fingold =

American politician (1908-1958)

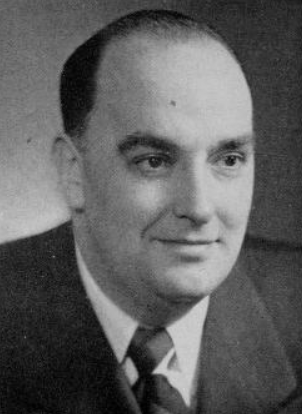

33rd Massachusetts Attorney General
- In office 1953 – August 31, 1958
- Governor: Christian A. Herter; Foster Furcolo
- Preceded by: Francis E. Kelly
- Succeeded by: Edward J. McCormack

Personal details
- Born: October 18, 1908 Boston, Massachusetts, U.S.
- Died: August 31, 1958 (aged 49) Concord, Massachusetts, U.S.
- Party: Republican
- Education: Suffolk University Law School
- Profession: Lawyer

George Fingold (October 18, 1908 – August 31, 1958) was an American politician from Massachusetts who served as Attorney General of Massachusetts from 1953 to 1958.

Fingold's political career began at the age of 21 when he was elected to the Malden City Council. He later served as Assistant District attorney of Middlesex County and as the Commonwealth's Assistant Attorney General in charge of prosecution of racketeers. In 1952, Fingold defeated incumbent Attorney General Francis E. Kelly.

On December 18, 1953, Fingold called for the Massachusetts Governor's Council to ban the comic book Panic within the state, on the grounds it "desecrated Christmas" depicting the holiday in a "pagan" manner. Under his orders the head of the state police, Captain Joseph Crescio, cut off the distribution of Panic throughout Massachusetts. By December 21, the book had been pulled from nearly all the newsstands in the Greater Boston area. Fingold warned distributors who resisted compliance that they would be susceptible to criminal prosecution, although it is unclear what they would've been charged with. Publisher William M. Gaines retaliated by announcing that he was permanently withdrawing Panic from distribution in the state of Massachusetts and yanking his Picture Stories From The Bible from that state (which hadn't been published in over five years). "The idea was, 'If you don't want us, we don't want you,'" explained editor and writer Al Feldstein, who said he had felt a "certain literary pride" in having his book banned.

Fingold died on August 31, 1958, at his home in Concord, Massachusetts. At the time of his death he was a candidate in the Republican primary for Governor of Massachusetts.

In 1960, the State Library of Massachusetts was named the George Fingold Library under Chapter 380, Acts of 1960.

== See also ==
- List of Jewish American jurists

Party political offices
Preceded by Frederick Ayer Jr.	Republican nominee for Attorney General of Massachusetts; 1952, 1954, 1956	Succeeded by Christian A. Herter Jr.
Legal offices
Preceded by Francis E. Kelly	Massachusetts Attorney General; 1953–1958	Succeeded by Edward J. McCormack, Jr.
