= Edward J. Cronin =

American politician and lawyer (1912–1958)

21st Massachusetts Secretary of the Commonwealth
- In office 1949 – November 24, 1958
- Governor: Paul A. Dever; Christian A. Herter; Foster Furcolo
- Preceded by: Frederic W. Cook
- Succeeded by: J. Henry Goguen

Personal details
- Born: February 25, 1912 Chelsea, Massachusetts, U.S.
- Died: November 24, 1958 (aged 46) Chelsea, Massachusetts, U.S.
- Party: Democratic Party
- Education: Northeastern University School of Law
- Profession: Lawyer

Edward Joseph Cronin (February 25, 1912 – November 24, 1958) was a Massachusetts lawyer and politician who served as Secretary of the Commonwealth from 1949 to 1958.

Party political offices
Preceded by Benedict F. Fitzgerald Jr.	Democratic nominee for Secretary of the Commonwealth of Massachusetts; 1948, 1950, 1952, 1954, 1956, 1958	Succeeded by Kevin White
Political offices
Preceded by Frederic W. Cook	21st Massachusetts Secretary of the Commonwealth; 1949 – November 24, 1958	Succeeded by J. Henry Goguen
