= Francis E. Kelly =

American politician (1903-1982)

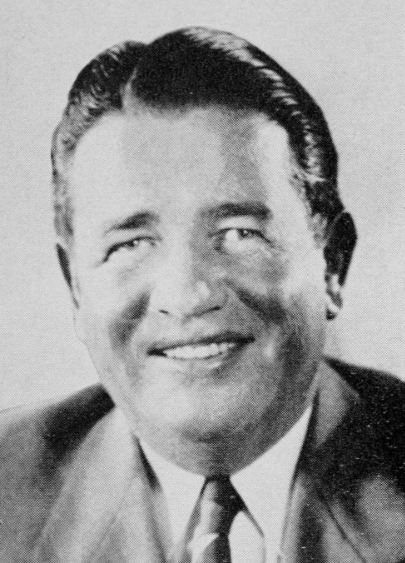

53rd Lieutenant Governor of Massachusetts
- In office January 7, 1937 – January 5, 1939
- Governor: Charles F. Hurley
- Preceded by: Joseph L. Hurley
- Succeeded by: Horace T. Cahill

32nd Attorney General of the Commonwealth of Massachusetts
- In office 1949–1953
- Governor: Paul A. Dever
- Preceded by: Clarence A. Barnes
- Succeeded by: George Fingold

Member of the Boston City Council
- In office 1930–1933

Personal details
- Born: March 26, 1903 Boston, Massachusetts, U.S.
- Died: January 27, 1982 (aged 78) Boston, Massachusetts, U.S.
- Party: Democratic
- Spouse: Marion G. MacDonald
- Relations: John B. Kelly (brother)
- Children: Francis E. "Frank" Kelly Jr.; Marion Kelly Daley
- Profession: Lawyer

Francis E. Kelly (March 26, 1903 – January 27, 1982) was an American politician who served as a member of the Boston City Council from 1930 to 1933, the 53rd lieutenant governor of Massachusetts from 1937 to 1939 and Massachusetts attorney general from 1949 to 1953. He was an early and perennial advocate of a public lottery, and acquired the nickname "Sweepstakes Kelly."

== Life and career ==
Kelly was born in the Meeting House Hill section of Boston on March 26, 1903. He was the oldest of nine children and lived the Dorchester neighborhood of Boston most of his life. He graduated from Boston English High School before attending Suffolk University Law School where he earned a law degree in 1928. That same year he was elected to the Boston City Council as representative for Ward 15. He was successfully re-elected for a second two-year term in 1930.

A member of the Democrat Party, Kelly unsuccessfully ran for the post of Lieutenant Governor of Massachusetts in 1932 and 1934, but ultimately succeeded in the 1936 election; serving in the post from 1937-1939. He later served as the Attorney General of Massachusetts from 1949-1953.

Party political offices
| Preceded by Joseph L. Hurley | Democratic nominee for Lieutenant Governor of Massachusetts; 1936 | Succeeded by James Henry Brennan |
| Preceded by James E. Agnew | Democratic nominee for Attorney General of Massachusetts; 1944, 1946, 1948, 1950, 1952 | Succeeded by John F. Collins |
| Preceded by Edward J. McCormack Jr. | Democratic nominee for Attorney General of Massachusetts; 1962 | Succeeded by James W. Hennigan Jr. |
Political offices
| Preceded by Joseph L. Hurley | Lieutenant Governor of Massachusetts; 1937–1939 | Succeeded by Horace T. Cahill |
Legal offices
| Preceded by Clarence A. Barnes | Attorney General of Massachusetts; 1949–1953 | Succeeded by George Fingold |
