= Christian Herter =

American politician (1895–1966)

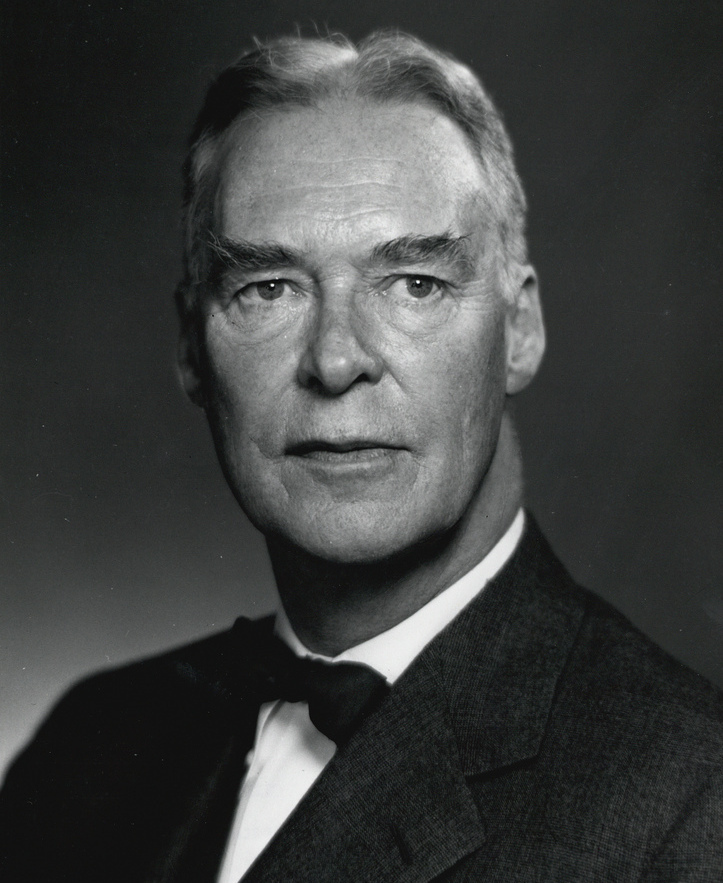

1st United States Trade Representative
- In office December 10, 1962 – December 30, 1966
- President: John F. Kennedy; Lyndon B. Johnson
- Preceded by: Position established
- Succeeded by: William M. Roth

53rd United States Secretary of State
- In office April 22, 1959 – January 20, 1961
- President: Dwight D. Eisenhower
- Preceded by: John Foster Dulles
- Succeeded by: Dean Rusk

20th United States Under Secretary of State
- In office February 21, 1957 – April 22, 1959
- President: Dwight D. Eisenhower
- Preceded by: Herbert Hoover Jr.
- Succeeded by: C. Douglas Dillon

59th Governor of Massachusetts
- In office January 8, 1953 – January 3, 1957
- Lieutenant: Sumner G. Whittier
- Preceded by: Paul A. Dever
- Succeeded by: Foster Furcolo

Member of the U.S. House of Representatives from Massachusetts's 10th district
- In office January 3, 1943 – January 3, 1953
- Preceded by: George H. Tinkham
- Succeeded by: Laurence Curtis

Speaker of the Massachusetts House of Representatives
- In office 1939–1943
- Preceded by: Horace T. Cahill
- Succeeded by: Rudolph King

Member of the Massachusetts House of Representatives from the 5th Suffolk district
- In office 1931–1943
- Preceded by: Henry Lee Shattuck
- Succeeded by: Henry Lee Shattuck

Personal details
- Born: Christian Archibald Herter; March 28, 1895 Paris, France
- Died: December 30, 1966 (aged 71) Washington, D.C., U.S.
- Resting place: Prospect Hill Cemetery
- Party: Republican
- Spouse: Mary Pratt (m. 1917)
- Education: Harvard University (BA); Columbia University

Christian Archibald Herter (March 28, 1895 – December 30, 1966) was an American diplomat and Republican politician who was the 59th governor of Massachusetts from 1953 to 1957 and US Secretary of State from 1959 to 1961. He served as president of the board of trustees at the Dexter School from 1937 to 1939. His moderate tone of negotiations was confronted by the intensity of Soviet leader Nikita Khrushchev in a series of unpleasant episodes that turned the Cold War even colder in 1960–1961.

== Early life ==
Herter was born in Paris, France, to American artist and expatriate parents, Albert Herter and Adele McGinnis, and attended the École Alsacienne there (1901–1904) before moving to New York City, where he attended the Browning School (1904–1911). He graduated from Harvard College in 1915 and did graduate work in architecture and interior design at Columbia Graduate School of Architecture, Planning and Preservation before joining the diplomatic corps.

Herter married the wealthy heiress Mary Caroline Pratt (1895–1980) in 1917. She was the daughter of Frederic B. Pratt, longtime head of the Pratt Institute and granddaughter of Standard Oil magnate Charles Pratt. They had three sons and one daughter, including Christian A. Herter Jr., who was active in international relations.

== Diplomatic career ==
He was made attaché to the Embassy of the United States, Berlin, and was briefly arrested while in Mainz as a possible spy. He was part of the US delegation to the 1919 Paris Peace Conference, where he helped draft the Covenant of the League of Nations. Later, he was the assistant to Herbert Hoover in providing starvation relief to postwar Europe. Herter went on to work for Hoover when Hoover became Secretary of Commerce in the Harding administration. Herter also participated in the 1919 meeting that resulted in creating the US Council on Foreign Relations.

Herter hated working for the scandal-ridden administration of President Harding, and returned to Boston, where he was a magazine editor and lecturer on international affairs.

== Political career ==
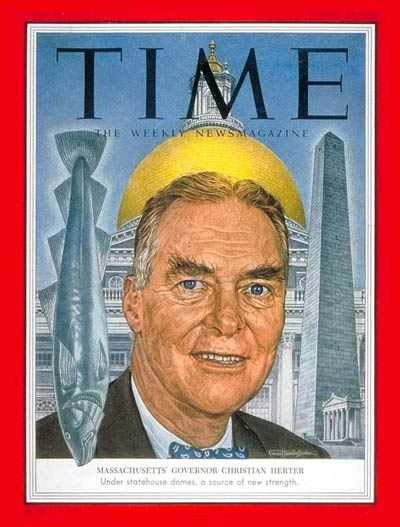
Christian Herter on the cover of Time magazine, August 17, 1953

In 1930, Herter was first elected to the Massachusetts House of Representatives and served for 12 years. In 1942, he sought the Massachusetts 10th district seat in the US House of Representatives, held by George H. Tinkham, whose isolationist views made him vulnerable during World War II. Once Herter entered the contest, Tinkham withdrew and so opened the way for Herter to be elected. Although he was critical of Franklin D. Roosevelt's liberal New Deal, Herter distinguished himself from 1943 to 1953 primarily for his stand on foreign affairs, especially in the so-called Herter Committee in 1947; its report initiated proposals that led to Harry S. Truman's Marshall Plan. In those years, he refused to support the permanence of the House Un-American Activities Committee. In 1947, Herter founded the Middle East Institute with Middle East scholar George Camp Keiser and then served on the board of trustees of the World Peace Foundation. He led bipartisan support for President Truman's Point Four Program giving technological help to poor countries.

Herter served five terms in Congress. In 1952, he ran successfully for governor of Massachusetts, narrowly defeating incumbent Governor Paul A. Dever.

Herter was re-elected governor in 1954, defeating Massachusetts House Minority Leader Robert F. Murphy. He chose not to seek a third term in 1956.

== Later diplomatic career ==
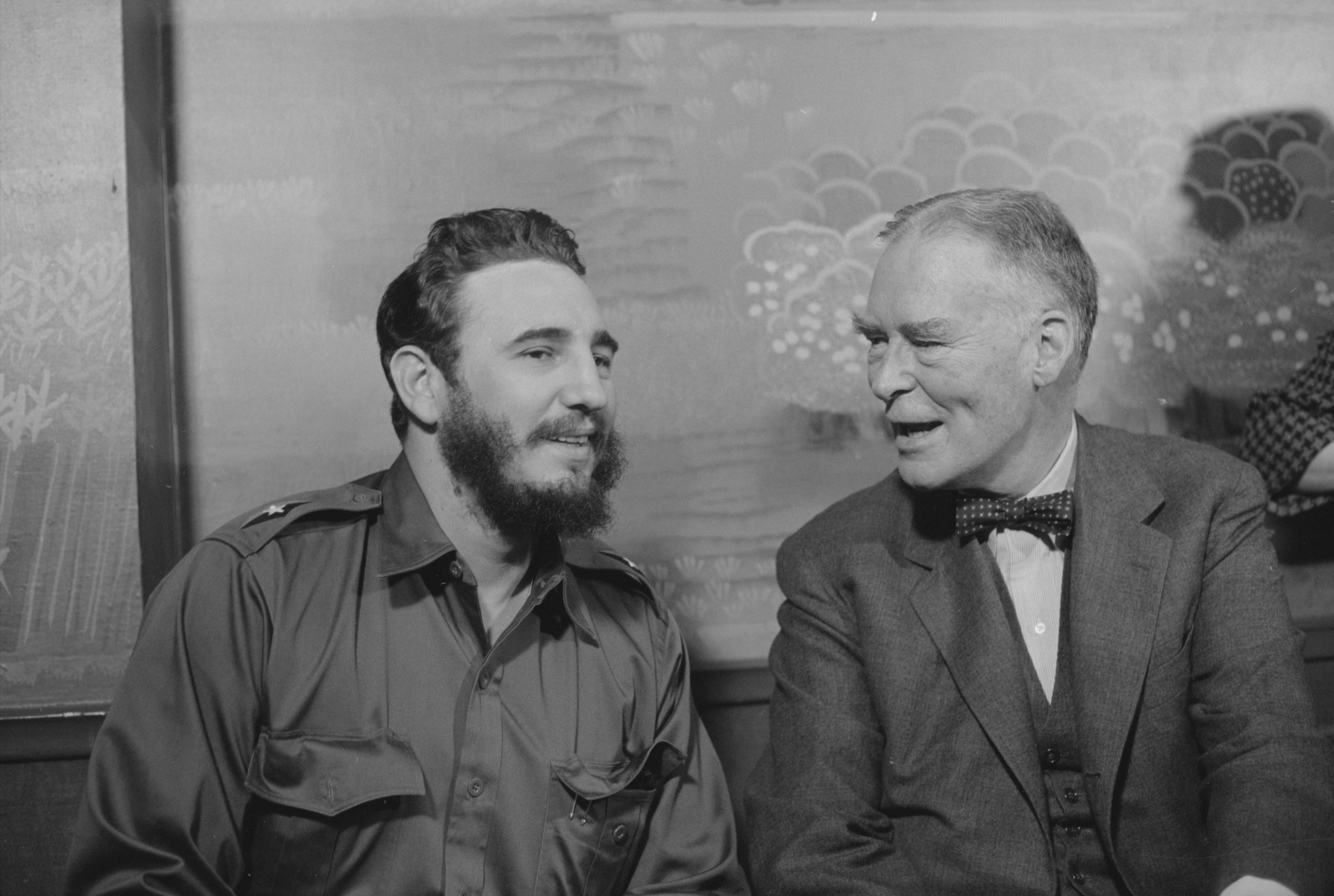
Fidel Castro seated next to Christian Herter at the Statler Hotel, New York City, 1959

On February 21, 1957, Herter was appointed Under Secretary of State for the second term of the Eisenhower administration; later, when John Foster Dulles became seriously ill, he was appointed Secretary of State, April 22, 1959. Dulles died a month later. Herter himself suffered from severe arthritis, forcing him to use crutches when walking.

Herter's main diplomatic challenges included escalating crises over the status of West Berlin in the Cold War; difficult negotiations with Soviet leader Nikita Khrushchev, especially regarding the Soviet downing of the U-2 spy plane; the collapse of the Paris Summit; and the early stages of American efforts to divert Fidel Castro's Cuban Revolution away from communism. There were smaller crises around the world including a civil war in the Congo. Herter's careful, cautious approach matched Eisenhower's preferences, emphasizing negotiation in response to bellicosity from the Kremlin. Despite the soft language, Herter supported strong policies against Cuba, and a refusal to compromise on Berlin. During his visit to West Berlin in July 1959, Herter was enthusiastically celebrated by over 100,000 people in the streets.

After leaving office he chaired a blue ribbon committee on State Department personnel, and was one of President John F. Kennedy's representatives for trade negotiations.

As an unemployed "elder statesman" after the election of 1960, Herter served on various councils and commissions, and was a special representative for trade negotiations, working for both John F. Kennedy and Lyndon B. Johnson until his death.

Secretary Herter was also an active Freemason. He was a member of the Grand Lodge of Ancient Free and Accepted Masons of the Commonwealth of Massachusetts.

Christian Herter's lifetime reputation was as an internationalist, especially interested in improving political and economic relations with Europe.

== Death ==
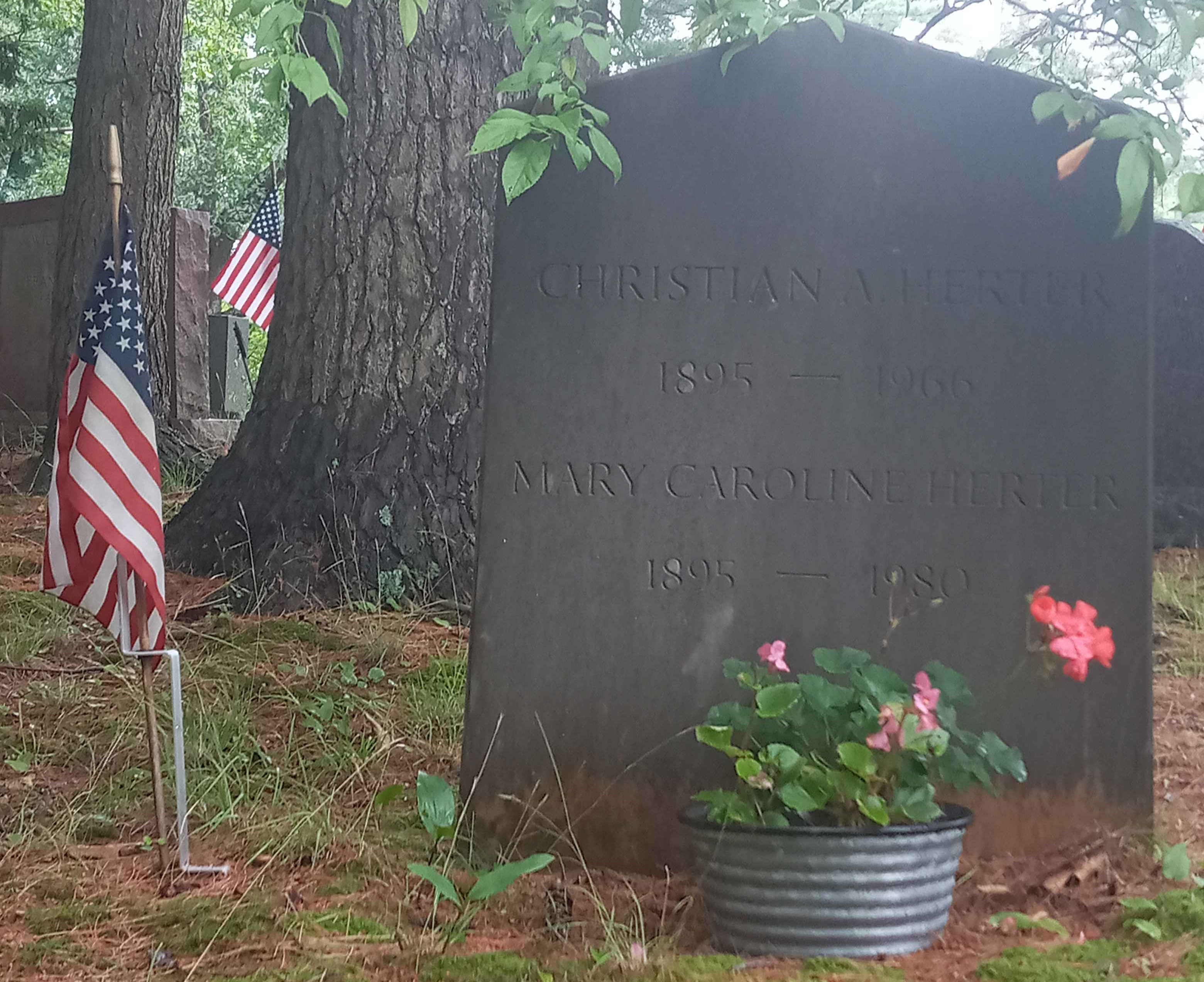
The gravesite of Christian Herter

He died on December 30, 1966, at his home in Washington, D.C., at the age of 71. He is buried at the Prospect Hill Cemetery in Millis, Massachusetts.

Herter's funeral was attended by US leaders including President Johnson and Secretary of State Dean Rusk. Johnson eulogized Herter as "a great American" and "a wise, gentle, and wholly dedicated patriot." Rusk called him "one of America's greatest public servants."

== Legacy ==
In 1943, with Paul Nitze (a distant cousin by marriage), Herter co-founded the School of Advanced International Studies (SAIS), which incorporated with the Johns Hopkins University in 1950.

In 1968, the American Foreign Service Association established its Christian A. Herter Award to honor senior diplomats who speak out or otherwise challenge the status quo. In 1948, Herter received an LL.D. from Bates College.

The World Affairs Council of Boston ("WorldBoston" as of 2002), which Christian Herter helped organize in the 1940s, also has a Christian A. Herter Award honoring individual contributions to international relations.

The Christian A. Herter Memorial Scholarship Program is a sponsored by the Commonwealth of Massachusetts to recruit 10th and 11th grade students whose socio-economic backgrounds and environmental conditions may inhibit their ability to pursue higher education. Each year, 25 students in the 10th and 11th grades are selected to receive awards of up to 50 percent (50%) of their calculated need at the college of their choice within the continental United States.

Herter Park in the Brighton neighborhood of Boston, Massachusetts is named in Herter's honor. A University of Massachusetts Amherst building devoted to the teaching of history and other liberal arts is named "Herter Hall" after the statesman as well.

Herter was the last serving Secretary of State born in the 19th century.

== Books ==
- Christian Herter, Toward an Atlantic Community (1963)

== See also ==
- Herter Committee
- Massachusetts legislature: 1931–1932, 1933–1934, 1935–1936, 1937–1938, 1939, 1941–1942, 1953-1954, 1955–1956
- Massachusetts House of Representatives' 5th Suffolk district
- List of United States governors born outside the United States

Political offices
Preceded by Horace Cahill	Speaker of the Massachusetts House of Representatives; 1939–1943	Succeeded by Rudolph King
Preceded by Paul Dever	Governor of Massachusetts; 1953–1957	Succeeded by Foster Furcolo
Preceded by Herbert Hoover	United States Under Secretary of State; 1957–1959	Succeeded by Douglas Dillon
Preceded by John Dulles	United States Secretary of State; 1959–1961	Succeeded by Dean Rusk
New office	United States Trade Representative; 1962–1966	Succeeded by William Roth
Party political offices
Preceded by Arthur Coolidge	Republican nominee for Governor of Massachusetts; 1952, 1954	Succeeded by Sumner Whittier
U.S. House of Representatives
Preceded by George Tinkham	Member of the U.S. House of Representatives from Massachusetts's 10th congressional district 1943–1953	Succeeded by Laurence Curtis
