= 1995–1996 Massachusetts legislature =

179th Massachusetts General Court
←	178th	180th	→

Overview
- Legislative body: General Court
- Term: January 4, 1995 – December 31, 1996
- Election: November 8, 1994

Senate
- Members: 40
- President: William Bulger (1995–1996); Tom Birmingham (1996)
- Majority Leader: Louis Peter Bertonazzi
- Majority Whip: Frederick Berry
- Minority Leader: Brian Lees
- Minority Whip: Lucile P. Hicks
- Party control: Democrat

House
- Members: 160
- Speaker: Charles Flaherty (1995–1996); Thomas Finneran (1996)
- Majority Leader: Richard Voke
- Majority Whip: Joan Menard
- Minority Leader: Edward B. Teague III
- Minority Whip: David Peters
- Party control: Democrat

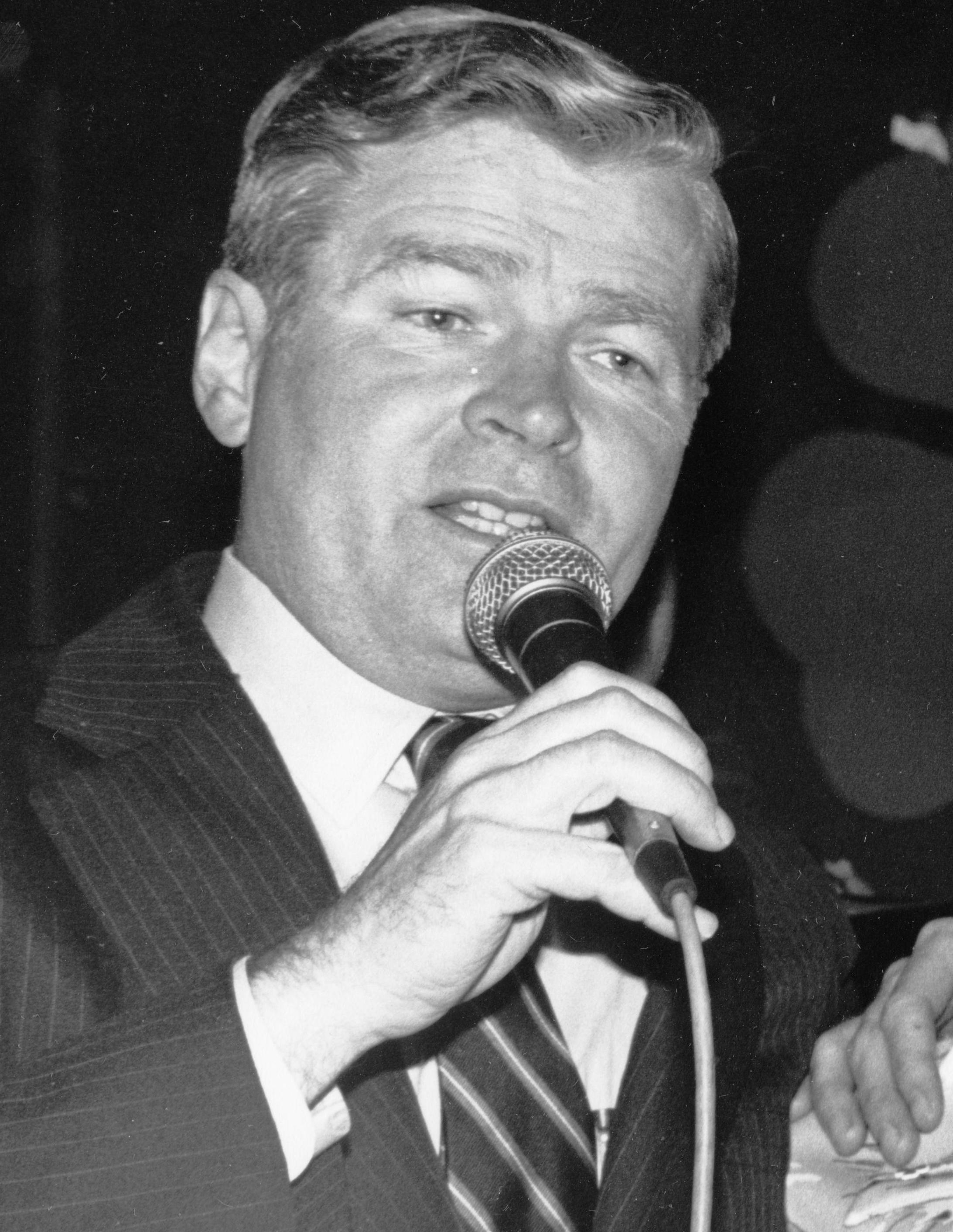
William Bulger, Senate president.

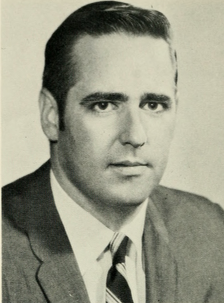
Charles Flaherty, House speaker.

Leaders of the Massachusetts General Court, 1995.

The 179th Massachusetts General Court, consisting of the Massachusetts Senate and the Massachusetts House of Representatives, met in 1995 and 1996 during the governorship of Bill Weld. William Bulger served as president of the Senate and Charles Flaherty served as speaker of the House.

== Senators ==
portrait	name	date of birth	district
	Matthew J. Amorello	March 15, 1958	2nd Worcester
	Robert A. Antonioni	July 15, 1958	
	Robert A. Bernstein	March 22, 1961	
	Frederick Berry	December 20, 1949	
	Louis Peter Bertonazzi	October 9, 1933	
	Tom Birmingham	August 4, 1949	
	William Bulger	February 2, 1934	
	Edward J. Clancy Jr.	June 30, 1950	
	Michael C. Creedon	November 3, 1946	
	Robert Havern III	July 17, 1949	
	Robert L. Hedlund	July 12, 1961	
	Lucile Hicks	May 11, 1938	
	Cheryl Jacques	February 17, 1962	
	James Jajuga	December 12, 1946	
	Bill Keating (politician)	September 6, 1952	
	Michael Knapik	February 11, 1963	
	Daniel P. Leahy	January 10, 1935	
	Brian Lees	July 25, 1953	
	David P. Magnani	May 24, 1944	
	Linda Melconian		
	Mark Montigny	June 20, 1961	
	Michael W. Morrissey	August 2, 1954	
	Therese Murray	October 10, 1947	
	Thomas C. Norton	December 11, 1934	
	John D. O'Brien Jr.	1960	
	Marc Pacheco	October 29, 1952	
	Lois Pines	August 16, 1940	
	Henri S. Rauschenbach	October 9, 1947	
	Stan Rosenberg	October 12, 1949	
	Charles E. Shannon Jr.	August 31, 1943	
	Jane Swift	February 24, 1965	
	Bruce Tarr	January 2, 1964	
	Richard Tisei	August 13, 1962	
	Robert Travaglini	July 20, 1952	
	Marian Walsh	1954	
	Robert D. Wetmore	July 24, 1930	
	W. Paul White	July 7, 1945	
	Dianne Wilkerson	May 2, 1955	

== Representatives ==
portrait	name	date of birth	district
	Louis Angelo	October 5, 1952	
	Steven Angelo	June 8, 1952	9th Essex
	Valerie Barsom	November 11, 1960	
	Michael G. Bellotti	March 21, 1963	
	John Binienda	June 22, 1947	
	Daniel E. Bosley	December 9, 1953	
	Marianne Brenton	February 25, 1933	
	James T. Brett	December 22, 1949	
	Stephen Brewer	February 10, 1948	
	Arthur Broadhurst	September 28, 1964	
	Carmen Buell	February 3, 1945	
	John Businger	February 5, 1945	
	Antonio Cabral	January 26, 1955	
	Michael P. Cahill	December 12, 1961	
	Thomas Cahir	September 19, 1952	
	Christine Canavan	January 25, 1950	
	Paul Caron	November 15, 1955	
	Paul Casey	February 26, 1961	
	Harriette L. Chandler	December 20, 1937	
	Evelyn Chesky	August 20, 1933	
	Vincent P. Ciampa	April 15, 1945	
	Carol Cleven	November 2, 1928	
	David B. Cohen (mayor)	September 2, 1947	
	James Colt	August 19, 1932	
	Edward G. Connolly	August 22, 1928	
	Gary Coon	March 25, 1964	
	Robert Correia	January 3, 1939	
	Frank Cousins (American politician)	May 7, 1958	
	Brian Cresta	April 22, 1969	
	Donna Cuomo	March 19, 1947	
	Charles Decas	October 5, 1937	
	Walter DeFilippi	October 3, 1926	
	Robert DeLeo (politician)	March 27, 1950	
	Paul C. Demakis	July 9, 1953	
	Brian Dempsey (politician)	September 30, 1966	
	Salvatore DiMasi	August 11, 1945	
	James DiPaola	May 5, 1953	
	Carol A. Donovan	June 5, 1937	
	Hasty Evans	August 7, 1948	
	James H. Fagan	October 13, 1947	
	Robert Fennell	June 26, 1956	
	Thomas Finneran	January 2, 1950	
	Kevin W. Fitzgerald	1950	
	Nancy Flavin	June 26, 1950	
	Gloria Fox	March 18, 1942	
	William C. Galvin	October 18, 1956	
	Barbara Gardner	January 19, 1941	
	Colleen Garry	July 21, 1962	
	David Gately	September 27, 1955	
	Ronald Gauch	February 13, 1938	
	Anthony Giglio	January 28, 1941	
	William Glodis	April 6, 1934	
	Emile Goguen	March 16, 1933	
	Thomas Golden Jr.	March 5, 1971	
	Shirley Gomes	January 23, 1940	
	Barbara Gray	October 11, 1926	
	William G. Greene Jr.	April 24, 1940	
	Patrick Guerriero	March 3, 1968	
	Cele Hahn	March 21, 1942	
	Paul Haley	June 9, 1953	
	Geoff Hall (politician)	October 10, 1948	
	Robert S. Hargraves	October 14, 1936	
	Lida E. Harkins	January 24, 1944	
	Robert Hawke	July 20, 1932	
	Albert Herren	June 8, 1952	
	Shirley Owens Hicks	April 22, 1942	
	Christopher Hodgkins	August 24, 1957	
	Kevin Honan	June 5, 1958	
	Barbara Hyland	October 17, 1943	
	Frank Hynes	December 23, 1940	
	M. Paul Iannuccillo	May 1, 1963	
	Patricia D. Jehlen	October 14, 1943	
	Bradley Jones Jr.	January 9, 1965	
	Louis Kafka	November 28, 1945	
	Jay R. Kaufman	May 4, 1947	
	Daniel F. Keenan	February 15, 1961	
	Shaun P. Kelly	March 13, 1964	
	Thomas P. Kennedy	August 15, 1951	
	Sally Kerans	May 26, 1960	
	Kay Khan	June 22, 1941	
	John C. Klimm	November 5, 1955	
	Robert Koczera	November 25, 1953	
	Paul Kollios	February 24, 1936	
	Robert Kraus	March 20, 1957	
	Paul Kujawski	August 26, 1953	
	Stephen Kulik	August 3, 1950	
	Edward M. Lambert Jr.	March 8, 1958	
	Patrick Landers	September 20, 1959	
	Harold M. Lane, Jr.	August 24, 1938	
	Peter J. Larkin	December 23, 1953	
	Edward LeLacheur	June 1, 1925	
	John Lepper	December 22, 1934	
	Jacqueline Lewis	May 3, 1945	
	Maryanne Lewis	1963	
	John A. Locke (Massachusetts politician)	November 27, 1962	
	Stephen F. Lynch	March 31, 1955	
	Anthony Mandile	August 14, 1946	
	Vincent G. Mannering	November 5, 1951	
	M. Joseph Manning	September 23, 1924	
	Ronald Mariano	October 31, 1946	
	Francis L. Marini	March 5, 1949	
	Jim Marzilli	May 8, 1958	
	John E. McDonough	May 21, 1953	
	Thomas M. McGee	December 15, 1955	
	Joseph B. McIntyre	April 11, 1957	
	William McManus	January 26, 1963	
	Joan Menard	September 6, 1935	
	Jim Miceli	March 25, 1935	
	Dennis M. Murphy	September 12, 1962	
	Mary Jeanette Murray	December 24, 1924	
	William P. Nagle Jr.	June 10, 1951	
	Harold Naughton Jr.	July 4, 1960	
	Janet O'Brien		
	Steven C. Panagiotakos	November 26, 1959	
	Marie Parente	May 22, 1928	
	Anne Paulsen	August 8, 1936	
	Vincent Pedone	March 15, 1967	
	David Peters (politician)	March 1, 1954	
	Douglas W. Petersen	March 7, 1948	
	George N. Peterson Jr.	July 8, 1950	
	Thomas Petrolati	March 16, 1957	
	Kevin Poirier	July 7, 1940	
	John F. Quinn	April 7, 1963	
	William Reinstein	March 26, 1929	
	Pam Resor	1942	
	Charlotte Golar Richie	December 11, 1958	
	Mary Rogeness	May 18, 1941	
	John H. Rogers	October 22, 1964	
	J. Michael Ruane	December 10, 1927	
	Byron Rushing	July 29, 1942	
	Angelo Scaccia	September 29, 1942	
	Anthony M. Scibelli	October 16, 1911	
	Emanuel Serra	June 12, 1945	
	Mary Jane Simmons	May 14, 1953	
	John P. Slattery	April 5, 1958	
	Jo Ann Sprague	November 3, 1931	
	Harriett Stanley	March 30, 1950	
	John Stefanini	March 23, 1964	
	Douglas Stoddart	March 5, 1952	
	Ellen Story	October 17, 1941	
	William M. Straus	June 26, 1956	
	Joseph Sullivan (mayor)	March 1, 1959	
	Michael Sullivan (U.S. Attorney)	October 3, 1954	
	Benjamin Swan	September 18, 1933	
	Linda Teagan	May 13, 1944	
	Edward B. Teague III	November 25, 1949	
	Alvin Thompson	May 15, 1939	
	A. Stephen Tobin	July 3, 1956	
	Steven Tolman	October 2, 1954	
	Timothy J. Toomey Jr.	June 7, 1953	
	Philip Travis	July 2, 1940	
	Eric Turkington	August 12, 1947	
	Daniel Valianti	1965	
	James E. Vallee	July 24, 1966	
	Anthony Verga	April 26, 1935	
	Richard Voke	December 2, 1947	
	Joseph Wagner (Massachusetts politician)	May 7, 1960	
	Patricia Walrath	August 11, 1941	

== See also ==
- Massachusetts Burma Law
- 104th United States Congress
- List of Massachusetts General Courts

== Images ==
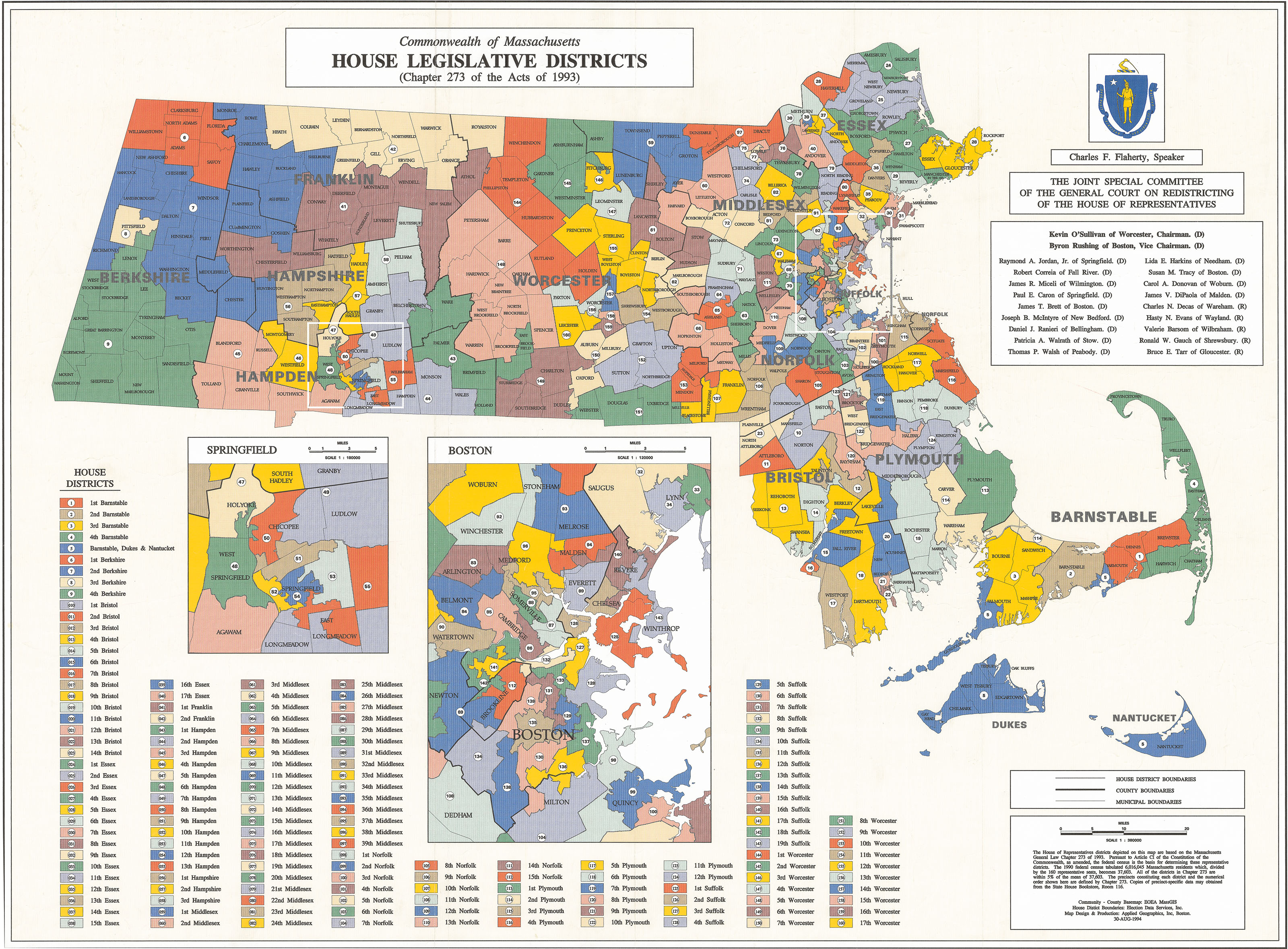
Map of the 160 districts of the Massachusetts House of Representatives apportioned in 1993
