= 1999–2000 Massachusetts legislature =

181st Massachusetts General Court

181st Massachusetts General Court
| ← | 180th | 182nd | → |

Overview
- Legislative body: General Court
- Term: January 6, 1999 – January 2, 2001

Senate
- Members: 40
- President: Tom Birmingham
- Majority Leader: Linda Melconian
- Majority Whip: Robert Travaglini
- Minority Leader: Brian Lees
- Minority Whip: Richard Tisei
- Party control: Democrat

House
- Members: 160
- Speaker: Thomas Finneran
- Majority Leader: William P. Nagle Jr.
- Majority Whip: Barbara Gardner
- Minority Leader: Francis L. Marini
- Minority Whip: Bradley Jones Jr.
- Party control: Democrat

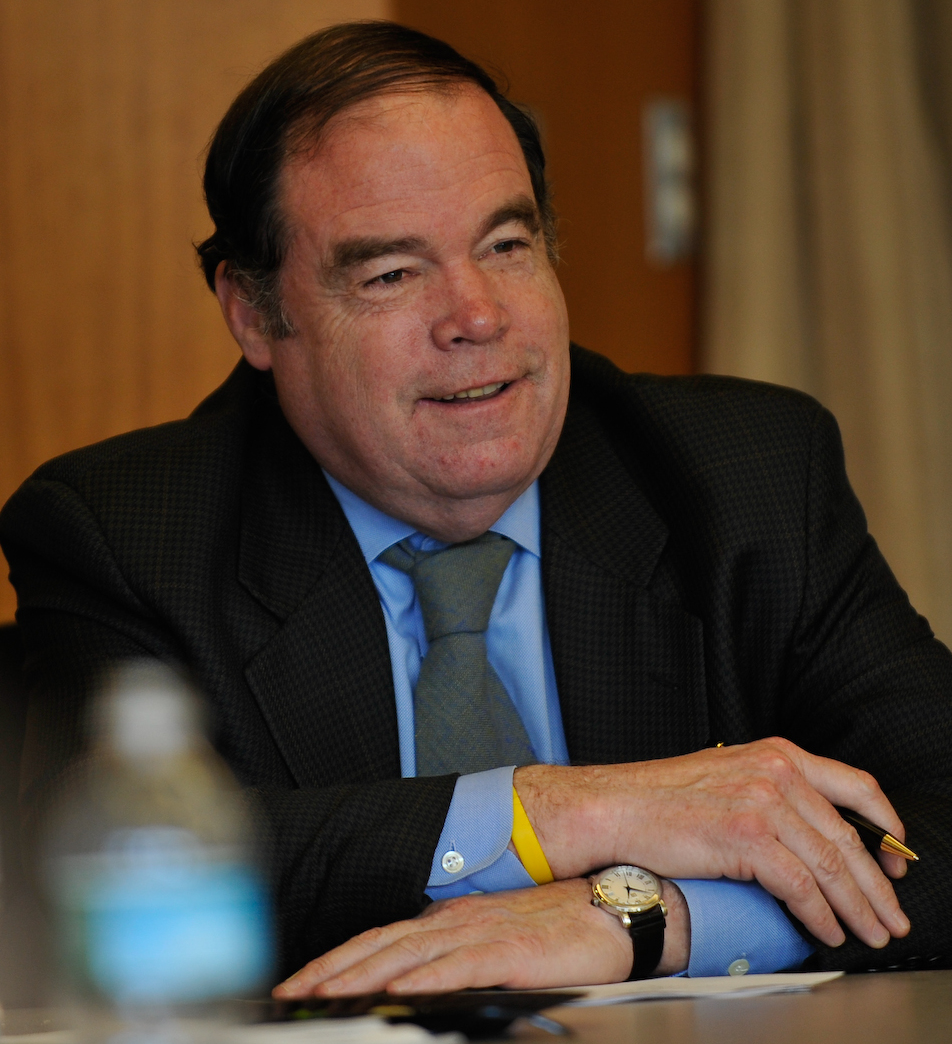
Tom Birmingham, Senate president.

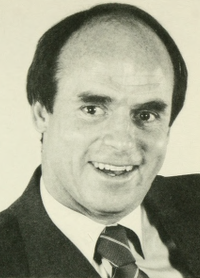
Thomas Finneran, House speaker.

Leaders of the Massachusetts General Court, 1999-2000.

The 181st Massachusetts General Court, consisting of the Massachusetts Senate and the Massachusetts House of Representatives, met in 1999 and 2000 during the governorship of Paul Cellucci. Tom Birmingham served as president of the Senate and Thomas Finneran served as speaker of the House.

Notable legislation included the Community Preservation Act.

== Senators ==
| portrait | name | date of birth | district |
|---|---|---|---|
| | Robert A. Antonioni | July 15, 1958 | |
| | Robert A. Bernstein | March 22, 1961 | 1st Worcester |
| | Frederick Berry | December 20, 1949 | |
| | Tom Birmingham | August 4, 1949 | |
| | Stephen Brewer | February 10, 1948 | |
| | Edward J. Clancy Jr. | June 30, 1950 | |
| | Robert Creedon | November 13, 1942 | |
| | Cynthia Stone Creem | September 17, 1942 | |
| | Susan Fargo | August 27, 1942 | |
| | Guy Glodis | February 15, 1969 | |
| | Robert Havern III | July 17, 1949 | |
| | Robert L. Hedlund | July 12, 1961 | |
| | Cheryl Jacques | February 17, 1962 | |
| | James Jajuga | December 12, 1946 | |
| | Brian A. Joyce | September 5, 1962 | |
| | Michael Knapik | February 11, 1963 | |
| | Brian Lees | July 25, 1953 | |
| | Stephen F. Lynch | March 31, 1955 | |
| | David P. Magnani | May 24, 1944 | |
| | Linda Melconian | | |
| | Joan Menard | September 6, 1935 | |
| | Mark Montigny | June 20, 1961 | |
| | Richard T. Moore | August 7, 1943 | |
| | Michael W. Morrissey | August 2, 1954 | |
| | Therese Murray | October 10, 1947 | |
| | Andrea F. Nuciforo Jr. | February 26, 1964 | |
| | Marc Pacheco | October 29, 1952 | |
| | Steven C. Panagiotakos | November 26, 1959 | |
| | Henri S. Rauschenbach | October 9, 1947 | |
| | Pam Resor | 1942 | |
| | Stan Rosenberg | October 12, 1949 | |
| | Charles E. Shannon Jr. | August 31, 1943 | |
| | Jo Ann Sprague | November 3, 1931 | |
| | Bruce Tarr | January 2, 1964 | |
| | Richard Tisei | August 13, 1962 | |
| | Steven Tolman | October 2, 1954 | |
| | Robert Travaglini | July 20, 1952 | |
| | Susan Tucker | November 7, 1944 | |
| | Marian Walsh | 1954 | |
| | Dianne Wilkerson | May 2, 1955 | |

== Representatives ==
| portrait | name | date of birth | district |
|---|---|---|---|
| | Steven Angelo | June 8, 1952 | 9th Essex |
| | Cory Atkins | February 10, 1949 | |
| | Demetrius Atsalis | March 31, 1964 | |
| | Bruce Ayers | April 17, 1962 | |
| | Ruth Balser | October 30, 1948 | |
| | Jarrett Barrios | October 16, 1969 | |
| | John Binienda | June 22, 1947 | |
| | Daniel E. Bosley | December 9, 1953 | |
| | Arthur Broadhurst | September 28, 1964 | |
| | Scott Brown | September 12, 1959 | |
| | David Bunker | | |
| | Antonio Cabral | January 26, 1955 | |
| | Nancy Caffyn | August 21, 1934 | |
| | Michael P. Cahill | December 12, 1961 | |
| | Christine Canavan | January 25, 1950 | |
| | Gale D. Candaras | 1949 | |
| | Paul Caron | November 15, 1955 | |
| | Mark Carron | July 8, 1962 | |
| | Paul Casey | February 26, 1961 | |
| | Harriette L. Chandler | December 20, 1937 | |
| | Evelyn Chesky | August 20, 1933 | |
| | Vincent P. Ciampa | April 15, 1945 | |
| | Carol Cleven | November 2, 1928 | |
| | Cheryl Coakley-Rivera | February 21, 1964 | |
| | Edward G. Connolly | August 22, 1928 | |
| | Robert Correia | January 3, 1939 | |
| | Geraldine Creedon | September 26, 1945 | |
| | Brian Cresta | April 22, 1969 | |
| | Walter DeFilippi | October 3, 1926 | |
| | Robert DeLeo | March 27, 1950 | |
| | Vinny deMacedo | October 16, 1965 | |
| | Paul C. Demakis | July 9, 1953 | |
| | Brian Dempsey | September 30, 1966 | |
| | Salvatore DiMasi | August 11, 1945 | |
| | David Donnelly | June 7, 1956 | |
| | Carol A. Donovan | June 5, 1937 | |
| | James H. Fagan | October 13, 1947 | |
| | Christopher Fallon | June 7, 1953 | |
| | Robert Fennell | June 26, 1956 | |
| | Mike Festa | May 9, 1954 | |
| | Barry Finegold | March 3, 1971 | |
| | Kevin L. Finnegan | June 1, 1964 | |
| | Thomas Finneran | January 2, 1950 | |
| | Kevin W. Fitzgerald | 1950 | |
| | Nancy Flavin | June 26, 1950 | |
| | Marie St. Fleur | May 4, 1962 | |
| | David Lawrence Flynn | February 5, 1933 | |
| | Gloria Fox | March 18, 1942 | |
| | John Fresolo | October 11, 1964 | |
| | Paul Frost | April 25, 1970 | |
| | William C. Galvin | October 18, 1956 | |
| | Barbara Gardner | January 19, 1941 | |
| | Colleen Garry | July 21, 1962 | |
| | David Gately | September 27, 1955 | |
| | Ronald Gauch | February 13, 1938 | |
| | Thomas N. George | May 2, 1938 | |
| | Anthony Giglio | January 28, 1941 | |
| | Emile Goguen | March 16, 1933 | |
| | Brian Paul Golden | February 2, 1965 | |
| | Thomas Golden Jr. | March 5, 1971 | |
| | Shirley Gomes | January 23, 1940 | |
| | William G. Greene Jr. | April 24, 1940 | |
| | Cele Hahn | March 21, 1942 | |
| | Paul Haley | June 9, 1953 | |
| | Geoff Hall | October 10, 1948 | |
| | Robert S. Hargraves | October 14, 1936 | |
| | Lida E. Harkins | January 24, 1944 | |
| | Jack Hart (state senator) | April 21, 1961 | |
| | Shirley Owens Hicks | April 22, 1942 | |
| | Bradford Hill | January 22, 1967 | |
| | Reed V. Hillman | November 30, 1948 | |
| | Christopher Hodgkins | August 24, 1957 | |
| | Kevin Honan | June 5, 1958 | |
| | Barbara Hyland | October 17, 1943 | |
| | Frank Hynes | December 23, 1940 | |
| | Patricia D. Jehlen | October 14, 1943 | |
| | Bradley Jones Jr. | January 9, 1965 | |
| | Louis Kafka | November 28, 1945 | |
| | Rachel Kaprielian | June 24, 1968 | |
| | Jay R. Kaufman | May 4, 1947 | |
| | Daniel F. Keenan | February 15, 1961 | |
| | Shaun P. Kelly | March 13, 1964 | |
| | Thomas P. Kennedy | August 15, 1951 | |
| | Jack Keough | | |
| | Kay Khan | June 22, 1941 | |
| | Brian Knuuttila | February 22, 1957 | |
| | Robert Koczera | November 25, 1953 | |
| | Peter Koutoujian | September 17, 1961 | |
| | Paul Kujawski | August 26, 1953 | |
| | Stephen Kulik | August 3, 1950 | |
| | Peter J. Larkin | December 23, 1953 | |
| | Stephen LeDuc | February 29, 1968 | |
| | John Lepper | December 22, 1934 | |
| | Maryanne Lewis | 1963 | |
| | David Linsky | October 16, 1957 | |
| | John A. Locke | November 27, 1962 | |
| | Liz Malia | September 30, 1949 | |
| | Ronald Mariano | October 31, 1946 | |
| | Francis L. Marini | March 5, 1949 | |
| | Jim Marzilli | May 8, 1958 | |
| | Thomas M. McGee | December 15, 1955 | |
| | William McManus | January 26, 1963 | |
| | John Merrigan | May 2, 1961 | |
| | Jim Miceli | March 25, 1935 | |
| | Charles A. Murphy | August 11, 1965 | |
| | Kevin J. Murphy | November 27, 1952 | |
| | Mary Jeanette Murray | December 24, 1924 | |
| | William P. Nagle Jr. | June 10, 1951 | |
| | David Nangle | December 18, 1960 | |
| | Harold Naughton Jr. | July 4, 1960 | |
| | Robert Nyman | August 20, 1960 | |
| | Thomas J. O'Brien | March 15, 1964 | |
| | Eugene O'Flaherty | July 20, 1968 | |
| | Marie Parente | May 22, 1928 | |
| | Anne Paulsen | August 8, 1936 | |
| | Vincent Pedone | March 15, 1967 | |
| | Douglas W. Petersen | March 7, 1948 | |
| | George N. Peterson Jr. | July 8, 1950 | |
| | Thomas Petrolati | March 16, 1957 | |
| | Anthony Petruccelli | October 2, 1972 | |
| | Elizabeth Poirier | October 27, 1942 | |
| | Susan W. Pope | October 9, 1942 | |
| | Ruth Provost | August 9, 1949 | |
| | John F. Quinn | April 7, 1963 | |
| | Kathi-Anne Reinstein | January 31, 1971 | |
| | Michael Rodrigues | May 30, 1959 | |
| | Mary Rogeness | May 18, 1941 | |
| | George Rogers | August 2, 1933 | |
| | John H. Rogers | October 22, 1964 | |
| | J. Michael Ruane | December 10, 1927 | |
| | Byron Rushing | July 29, 1942 | |
| | José L. Santiago | | |
| | Angelo Scaccia | September 29, 1942 | |
| | Mary Jane Simmons | May 14, 1953 | |
| | John P. Slattery | April 5, 1958 | |
| | Theodore C. Speliotis | August 20, 1953 | |
| | Harriett Stanley | March 30, 1950 | |
| | John Stasik | June 5, 1942 | |
| | John Stefanini | March 23, 1964 | |
| | Ellen Story | October 17, 1941 | |
| | William M. Straus | June 26, 1956 | |
| | David B. Sullivan | June 6, 1953 | |
| | Joseph Sullivan (mayor) | March 1, 1959 | |
| | Benjamin Swan | September 18, 1933 | |
| | Ronny Sydney | July 10, 1938 | |
| | Kathleen Teahan | June 11, 1947 | |
| | Walter Timilty | July 19, 1969 | |
| | A. Stephen Tobin | July 3, 1956 | |
| | Timothy J. Toomey Jr. | June 7, 1953 | |
| | David Torrisi | September 18, 1968 | |
| | Philip Travis | July 2, 1940 | |
| | Eric Turkington | August 12, 1947 | |
| | David Tuttle | | |
| | James E. Vallee | July 24, 1966 | |
| | Anthony Verga | April 26, 1935 | |
| | Joseph Wagner | May 7, 1960 | |
| | Patricia Walrath | August 11, 1941 | |
| | Marty Walsh | April 10, 1967 | |
| | Alice Wolf | December 24, 1933 | |

== See also ==
- 106th United States Congress
- List of Massachusetts General Courts
