= Edward Teague =

Edward Teague may refer to:

- Eddie Teague (1921–1987), American football coach and college athletics administrator
- Edward B. Teague III (born 1949), American politician from Massachusetts
- Edward Teague (character), Pirates of the Caribbean character
