= Tom Birmingham =

American politician (1949–2023)

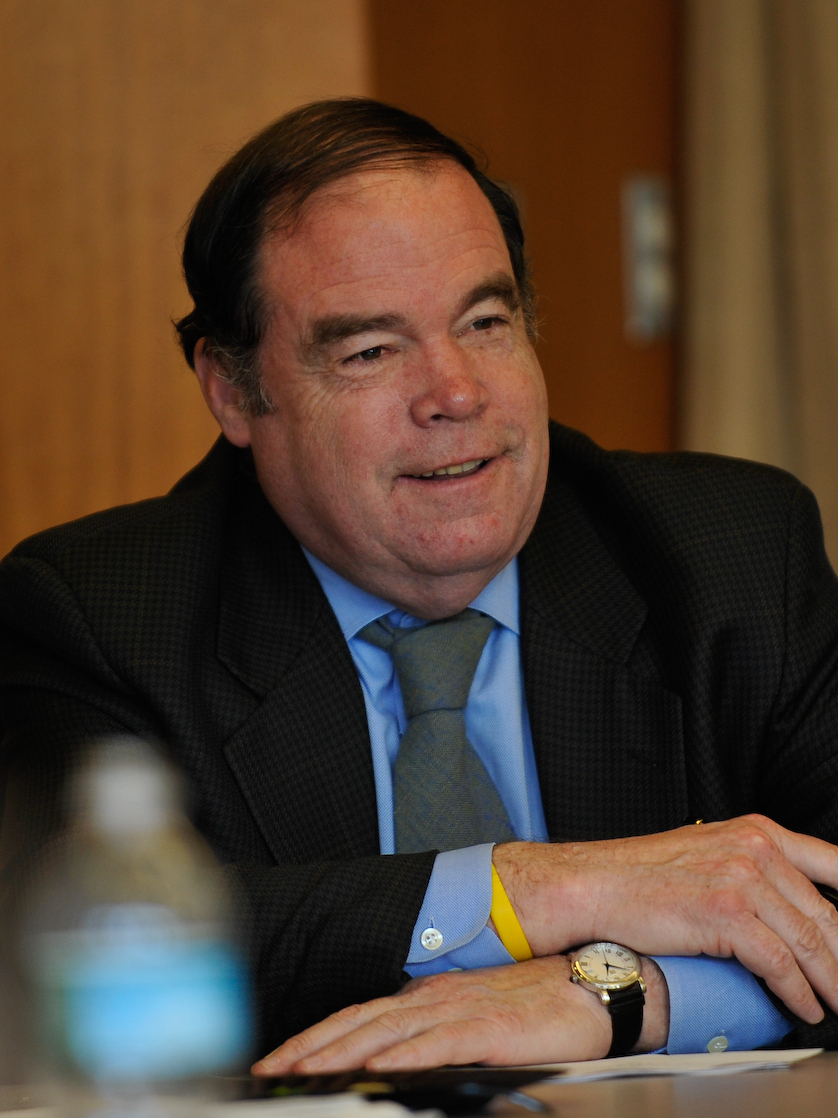
- Birmingham in 2009

President of the Massachusetts Senate
- In office January 1996 – December 2002
- Preceded by: William M. Bulger
- Succeeded by: Robert Travaglini

Member of the Massachusetts Senate from the Middlesex, Suffolk and Essex district
- In office January 1991 – December 2002
- Preceded by: Francis D. Doris
- Succeeded by: Jarrett Barrios

Personal details
- Born: Thomas Francis Birmingham; August 4, 1949
- Died: January 20, 2023 (aged 73) Boston, Massachusetts
- Party: Democratic
- Spouse: Selma Botman
- Children: 2
- Education: Harvard, Harvard Law, Exeter College, University Of Oxford

Thomas Francis Birmingham (August 4, 1949 – January 20, 2023) was an American politician who served as the President of the Massachusetts Senate. He is widely credited, along with Mark Roosevelt, with passage of a sweeping education bill, the Education Reform Act of 1993.

He was a graduate of Austin Preparatory School, Phillips Exeter Academy, Harvard College, and Harvard Law School, and he received a Rhodes Scholarship to study at Oxford University after his 1972 graduation from Harvard College. He was an unsuccessful candidate for the Democratic nomination for Massachusetts governor in 2002, despite impressive fundraising. An avid cyclist, Birmingham biked across the state of Massachusetts in 2001.

In 1999, his proposal to keep the home stadium of the New England Patriots in Massachusetts was accepted by Patriots owner Robert Kraft and passed by the state legislature.

Birmingham served as senior counsel at the law firm of Edwards Wildman Palmer, taught state and local government at Tufts University and education policy at Northeastern University in Boston. In March 2014, he joined Citizen Schools Massachusetts as executive director. In early 2015, he left Citizen Schools Massachusetts to become a distinguished senior fellow in education at Pioneer Institute. His is listed as a notable holder of the Birmingham coat of arms. His wife, Selma Botman, has a Ph.D. in Middle Eastern Studies from Harvard University and served as the President of the University of Southern Maine. They have two daughters, Erica and Megan.

Birmingham died on January 20, 2023, at the age of 73.

== See also ==
- 1991–1992 Massachusetts legislature
- 1993–1994 Massachusetts legislature
- 1995–1996 Massachusetts legislature
- 1997–1998 Massachusetts legislature
- 1999–2000 Massachusetts legislature
- 2001–2002 Massachusetts legislature

Political offices
Preceded by Patricia McGovern	Chairman of the Massachusetts Senate Ways and Means Committee; 1993–1996	Succeeded by Stan Rosenberg
