= Salvatore DiMasi =

American politician (born 1945)

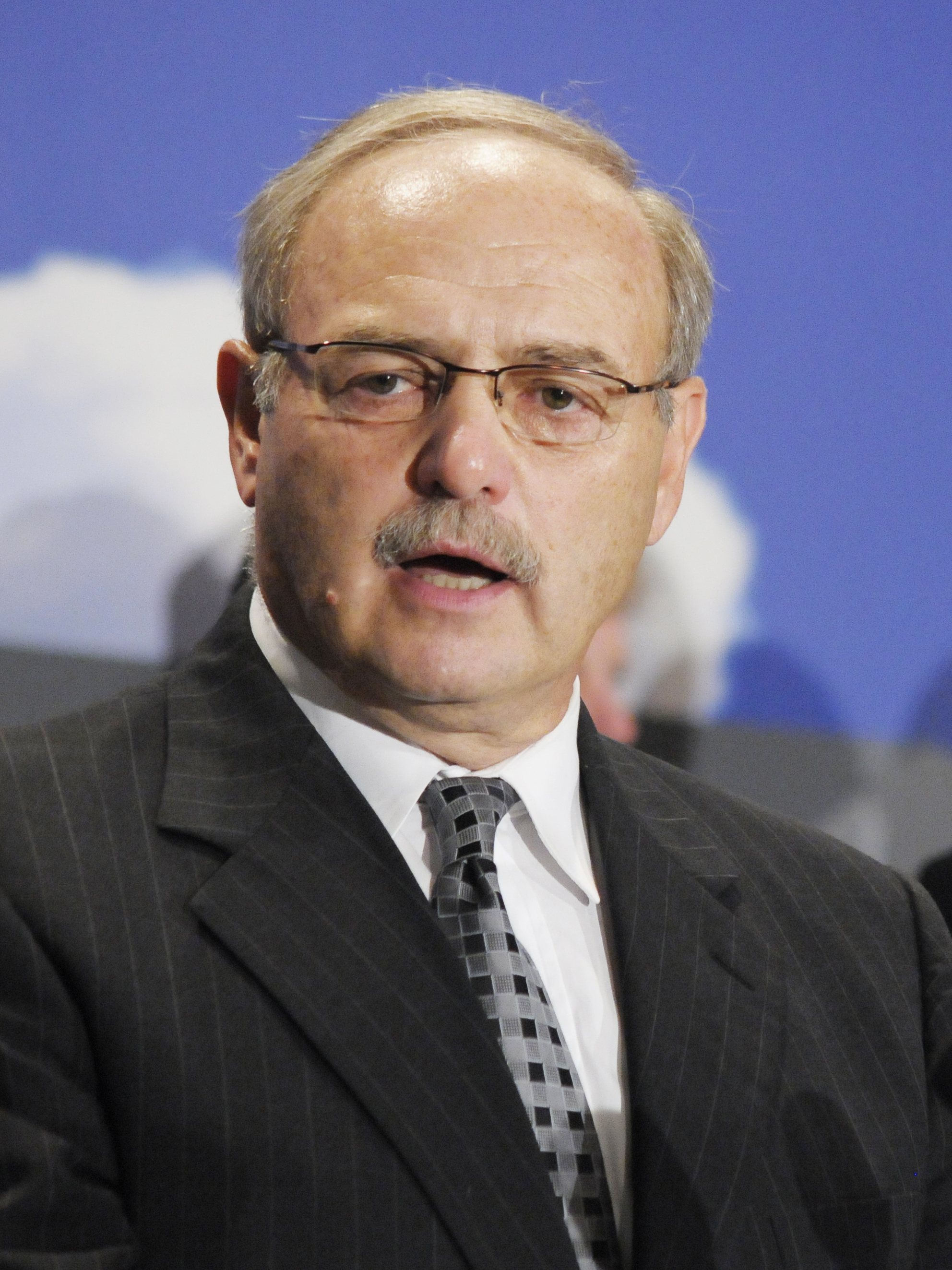
- DiMasi in 2008

84th Speaker of the Massachusetts House of Representatives
- In office September 28, 2004 – January 27, 2009
- Governor: Mitt Romney; Deval Patrick
- Preceded by: Thomas Finneran
- Succeeded by: Robert DeLeo

Member of the Massachusetts House of Representatives from the 3rd Suffolk district
- In office January 1979 – January 27, 2009
- Preceded by: O. Roland Orlandi
- Succeeded by: Aaron Michlewitz

Personal details
- Born: Salvatore Francis DiMasi; August 11, 1945 (age 81) North End, Boston, Massachusetts
- Party: Democratic
- Education: Boston College Suffolk University Law School
- Profession: Lawyer

Salvatore Francis "Sal" DiMasi (born August 11, 1945) is a former Democratic state representative in Massachusetts. The former Speaker of the Massachusetts House of Representatives originally joined the state legislature in 1979, as a member of the Democratic Party. He eventually resigned from this post in January 2009, just six months prior to being indicted on several federal charges, including conspiracy to defraud the federal government, extortion, mail fraud and wire fraud. DiMasi was found guilty on 7 of 9 federal corruption charges on June 15, 2011. DiMasi is the third consecutive Massachusetts house speaker to later become a convicted felon due to crimes committed in office.

DiMasi went to college at Boston College and studied law at Suffolk University Law School. He was born and raised in the North End of Boston, home to Boston's Italian American community for over 100 years. He was the commonwealth's first Italian-American to be elected speaker of the Massachusetts House of Representatives.

== Early life and education ==
DiMasi grew up in a cold water flat in Boston's North End where he lived with his parents Celia and Joseph DiMasi, his two brothers, and Italian immigrant grandparents. DiMasi graduated from Christopher Columbus High School (1963) and went on to earn a BS in accounting from Boston College (1967) and a Juris Doctor from Suffolk University Law School (1971).

== Professional career ==
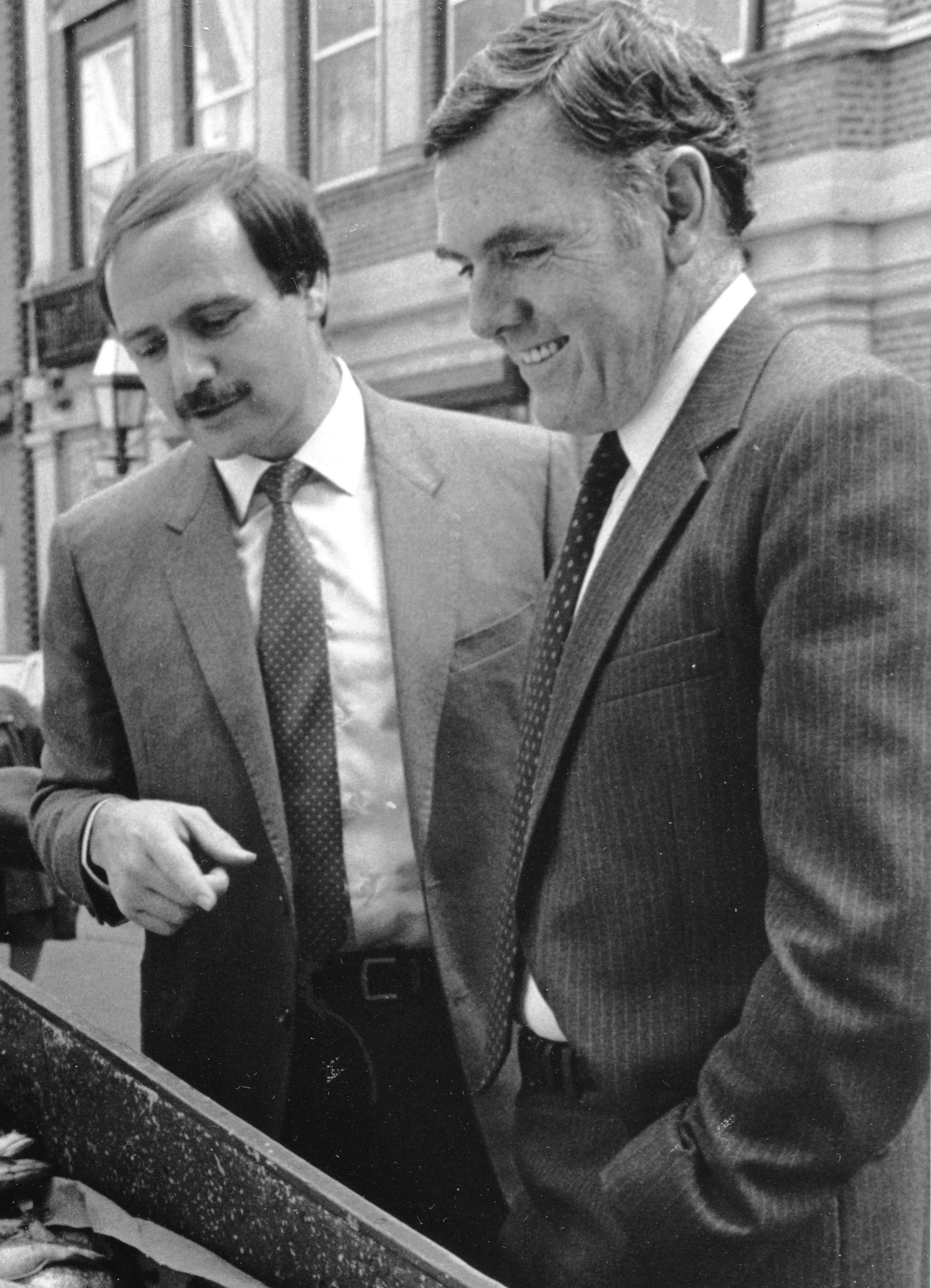
DiMasi (left) with Boston mayor Raymond Flynn in the early 1980s

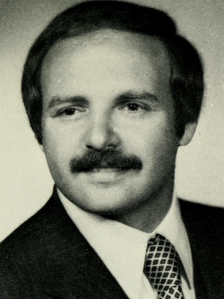
1983 official portrait of DiMasi

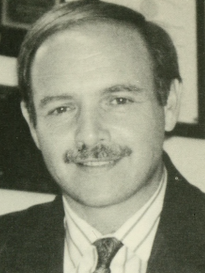
1995 official portrait of DiMasi

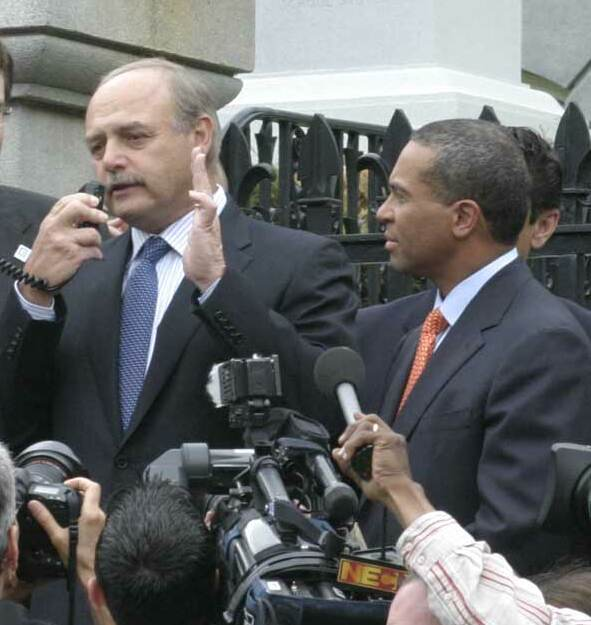
DiMasi (left) and Governor Deval Patrick celebrate the defeat of a 2007 effort to prohibit same-sex marriage

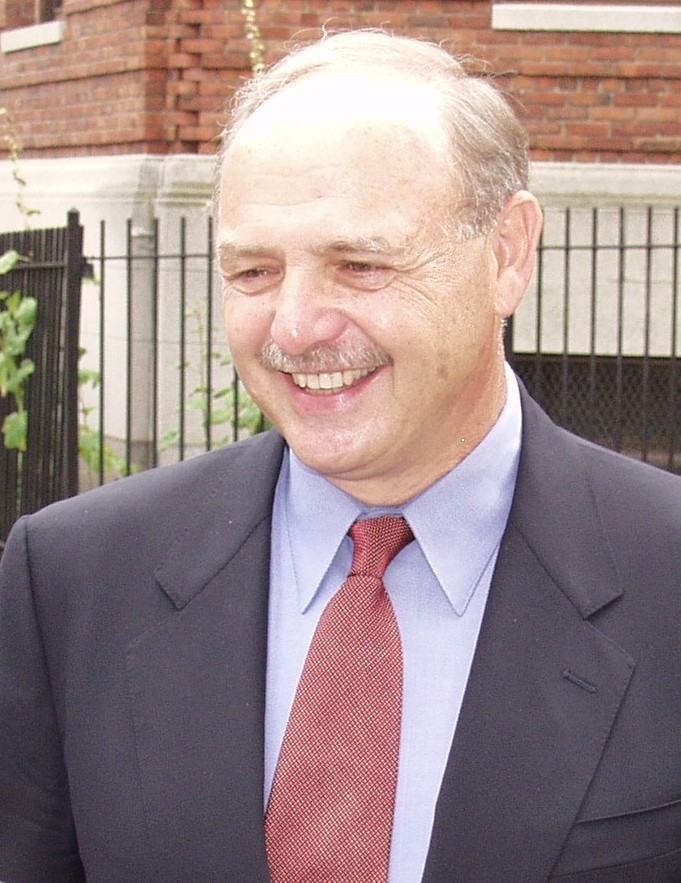
DiMasi circa 2008

From 1974 to 1976, DiMasi served as a Suffolk County assistant district attorney. During the same period, DiMasi co-founded the North End Neighborhood Task Force, with neighborhood activist Emile Pugliano, to address issues of zoning, gentrification and crime in Boston's North End. He also opened a private law practice, focused on criminal defense cases.

In 1976, DiMasi ran for state representative against three term incumbent O. Roland Orlandi (D-North End). DiMasi's 1976 state representative campaign was unsuccessful. Two years later, DiMasi ran again for the third Suffolk County state representative seat—and won. In 1979, DiMasi took office as state representative.

While in office, DiMasi served as chairman of the committees on Banks and Banking, the Judiciary and Criminal Justice. He eventually rose to among the ranks to become assistant majority whip, majority whip and majority leader. In September 2004, DiMasi was elected speaker of the House.

== Healthcare reform ==
Soon after becoming speaker of the House, DiMasi sponsored legislation to make health insurance available for all commonwealth residents. DiMasi worked with legislative leaders and a coalition of diverse stakeholders from the health care and business community to craft Massachusetts's landmark health care law. In April 2006, Governor Mitt Romney signed the first-in-the-nation universal health insurance bill into law. As a result of the law, Massachusetts reduced the number of uninsured adults by nearly half within the first year of mandatory health coverage and increased the percentage of people receiving routine preventive care, according to the first major study of the 2006 law conducted by the Urban Institute.

== Casino gambling ==
In 2007, Massachusetts governor Deval Patrick submitted a bill that would allow the construction and operation of three resort-style casinos in the state. He argued that these casinos would generate $2 billion for the state economy and add $400 million in annual casino revenue and $200 million in fees per license to the state coffers as well as add $50 million to $80 million in sales, meal, and hotel taxes. He also touted that the casinos would create 30,000 construction jobs and 20,000 permanent jobs.

Patrick proposed that the revenue generated would be spent to beef up local law enforcement, create a state gambling regulatory agency, repair roads and bridges ($200 million), gambling addiction treatment ($50 million) and the remainder would go towards property tax relief.

DiMasi strongly opposed the plan, questioning the governor's job and revenue projections, and was opposed to what he referred to as a casino culture, saying: "Do we want to usher in a casino culture—with rampant bankruptcies, crime and social ills—or do we want to create a better Massachusetts for all sectors of the society?"

On March 20, 2008, the Massachusetts House of Representatives rejected Patrick's casino bill by a vote of 108 to 46. Despite the overwhelming vote, questions were raised by critics of DiMasi as to the tactics he used to win. These included allegations that he promised a subsequent vote on a bill that would allow slot machines at the state's four racetracks and the pre-vote promotions of six lawmakers who had been thought to support the bill, but either abstained or voted against the bill. DiMasi denied that any promise had been made on the race track bill and denied that the promotions were connected to the casino bill vote.

== Corruption case ==
According to The Boston Globe, "DiMasi and three of his close friends and associates are the subjects of the Ethics Commission probe and other investigations relating to large payments the associates received from Cognos ULC ...", an IBM-owned company based in Ottawa, Ontario, Canada, with a United States headquarters in Burlington, Massachusetts. The Globe also said that "One of the associates, Richard Vitale, DiMasi's accountant, also accepted payments from ticket brokers who were seeking to gut state antiscalping laws." The contracts in question, a $4.5 million contract for the State Board of Education and a $13 million contract for the State Information Technology division, were rescinded after the alleged ethics violations came to light. IBM, which did not own Cognos at the time of the alleged payoffs, has refunded all paid monies. On December 17, 2008, the Globe confirmed that a federal grand jury probe had been launched to investigate the charges.

=== Resignation ===
On Sunday, January 25, 2009, DiMasi sent a letter to all members of the House informing them of his resignation from both his position as speaker of the House and his seat in the House, effective at 5:00 pm on Tuesday, January 27. His resignation made DiMasi the third straight speaker of the Massachusetts House of Representatives to leave office under a legal or ethical cloud. In 1996, then speaker Charles Flaherty resigned after being charged with income tax violations, and in 2004 then speaker Thomas Finneran resigned amid a federal perjury investigation. DiMasi was indicted on corruption charges on June 2, 2009.

=== Indictment ===
On June 2, 2009, DiMasi and three others were indicted on charges that included conspiracy, honest services fraud, mail fraud, aiding and abetting, and wire fraud.

On October 13, 2009, federal prosecutors added a count of extortion to the charges against DiMasi. With the added charge, DiMasi faced a possible 185-year sentence if convicted on all counts in the indictment. He pleaded not guilty to all charges.

=== Conviction and sentencing ===
On June 15, 2011, DiMasi was convicted on seven of the nine charges. His co-defendant, lobbyist Richard McDonough, was also convicted of taking part in the conspiracy.

On September 9, 2011, DiMasi was sentenced to eight years in federal prison by U.S. District Court Judge Mark Lawrence Wolf and ordered to pay a fine of $65,000. The judge also sentenced DiMasi to two years of supervised release after completing his sentence. McDonough received a seven-year sentence.

DiMasi served his sentence at the Federal Medical Center, Butner, a federal prison in North Carolina, and was released on November 23, 2016.

=== Revocation of pension ===
On August 30, 2012, the Massachusetts Retirement Board voted 5 to 0 to revoke DiMasi's $60,142-a-year pension. His pension had been suspended since September 2011.

=== Release from prison ===
In October 2016, federal prosecutors asked a federal judge to give early release to DiMasi due to illness after battling cancer.

In November 2016, Judge Mark L. Wolf released a 69-page ruling concluding that DiMasi, US Attorney Ortiz's office, and federal prison officials convincingly demonstrated that DiMasi's health has declined so severely that further imprisonment was no longer warranted due to a severe illness. He was released from Federal Medical Center, Butner, on November 22, 2016, after serving five years of an eight-year sentence.

In March 2018, a petition by DiMasi to vacate his sentence was dismissed by a district court judge.

On April 22, 2019, the state of Massachusetts rejected DiMasi's application to lobby the legislature, and later in the week he registered as a lobbyist with the city of Boston.

== See also ==
- Massachusetts health care reform
- 1979–1980 Massachusetts legislature
- 1981–1982 Massachusetts legislature
- 1983–1984 Massachusetts legislature
- 1985–1986 Massachusetts legislature
- 1987–1988 Massachusetts legislature
- 1989–1990 Massachusetts legislature
- 1991–1992 Massachusetts legislature
- 1993–1994 Massachusetts legislature
- 1995–1996 Massachusetts legislature
- 1997–1998 Massachusetts legislature
- 1999–2000 Massachusetts legislature
- 2001–2002 Massachusetts legislature
- 2003–2004 Massachusetts legislature
- 2005–2006 Massachusetts legislature
- 2007–2008 Massachusetts legislature

Massachusetts House of Representatives
Preceded by Thomas Finneran	Speaker; 2004–2009	Succeeded by Robert DeLeo
Preceded by William P. Nagle, Jr.	Majority Leader; 2001-2004	Succeeded by John H. Rogers
Preceded by O. Roland Orlandi	Massachusetts State Representative for the 3rd Suffolk District; 1979–2009	Succeeded by Aaron M. Michlewitz
