= Josh S. Cutler =

American politician

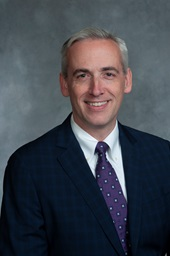

Member of the Massachusetts House of Representatives from the 6th Plymouth district
- In office January 2, 2013 – February 4, 2024
- Preceded by: Daniel K. Webster
- Succeeded by: Kenneth Sweezey

Personal details
- Born: January 22, 1971 (age 55) Duxbury, Massachusetts, U.S.
- Party: Democratic
- Children: 2
- Education: Skidmore College (BA); Suffolk University Law School (JD); UMass-Dartmouth (MA)
- Website: joshcutler.com

Josh S. Cutler (born January 22, 1971) is an attorney and former member of the Massachusetts House of Representatives. He represented the 6th Plymouth district of Massachusetts, which includes every precinct in the towns of Pembroke and Hanson, and precincts 2, 3, 4, 5, and 6 of Duxbury. Cutler was elected on November, 6th 2012 becoming the first Democrat to hold the seat for the 6th Plymouth District dating back to the Reconstruction era.

Cutler resigned from the Massachusetts House after being appointed to a position in the administration of Governor Maura Healey.

== Education and early career ==
Cutler grew up in Duxbury and Marshfield. He later graduated from Skidmore College with a B.A. in political science and from Suffolk University Law School. He earned a master's degree in public policy from UMass-Dartmouth.

For ten years Cutler served as editor, and later publisher, of the Duxbury Clipper, a family-run newspaper first established by his grandparent in 1950. Cutler expanded the business, launching new publications, acquiring others and bringing printing operations in-house.

Cutler was elected on November 6, 2012, as state representative for the 6th Plymouth District of Massachusetts, making him the first Democrat to hold the seat dating back to the reconstruction era of the United States of America.

In 2024, Cutler was named the undersecretary of Apprenticeship, Work-Based Learning, and Policy in the administration of Massachusetts governor Maura Healey.

== Community involvement ==
Cutler is an elected member of the Duxbury Planning Board and Duxbury Democratic Town Committee. He is also a member of the Duxbury Alternative Energy Committee and co-chairs the Solar Energy Subcommittee. Prior to moving back to Duxbury, Cutler served for three years as a Selectman in the Town of Hull.

An active volunteer, Cutler serves on the board of directors for the Duxbury Free Library, Inc., the Duxbury Rural & Historical Society, the Duxbury Business Association and Pembroke Chamber of Commerce. He is a Meal on Wheels driver and a member of the Duxbury 375th Committee and the War Memorial Committee.

== See also ==
- 2019–2020 Massachusetts legislature
- 2021–2022 Massachusetts legislature
- 2023–2024 Massachusetts legislature
