= Therese Murray =

American politician (born 1947)

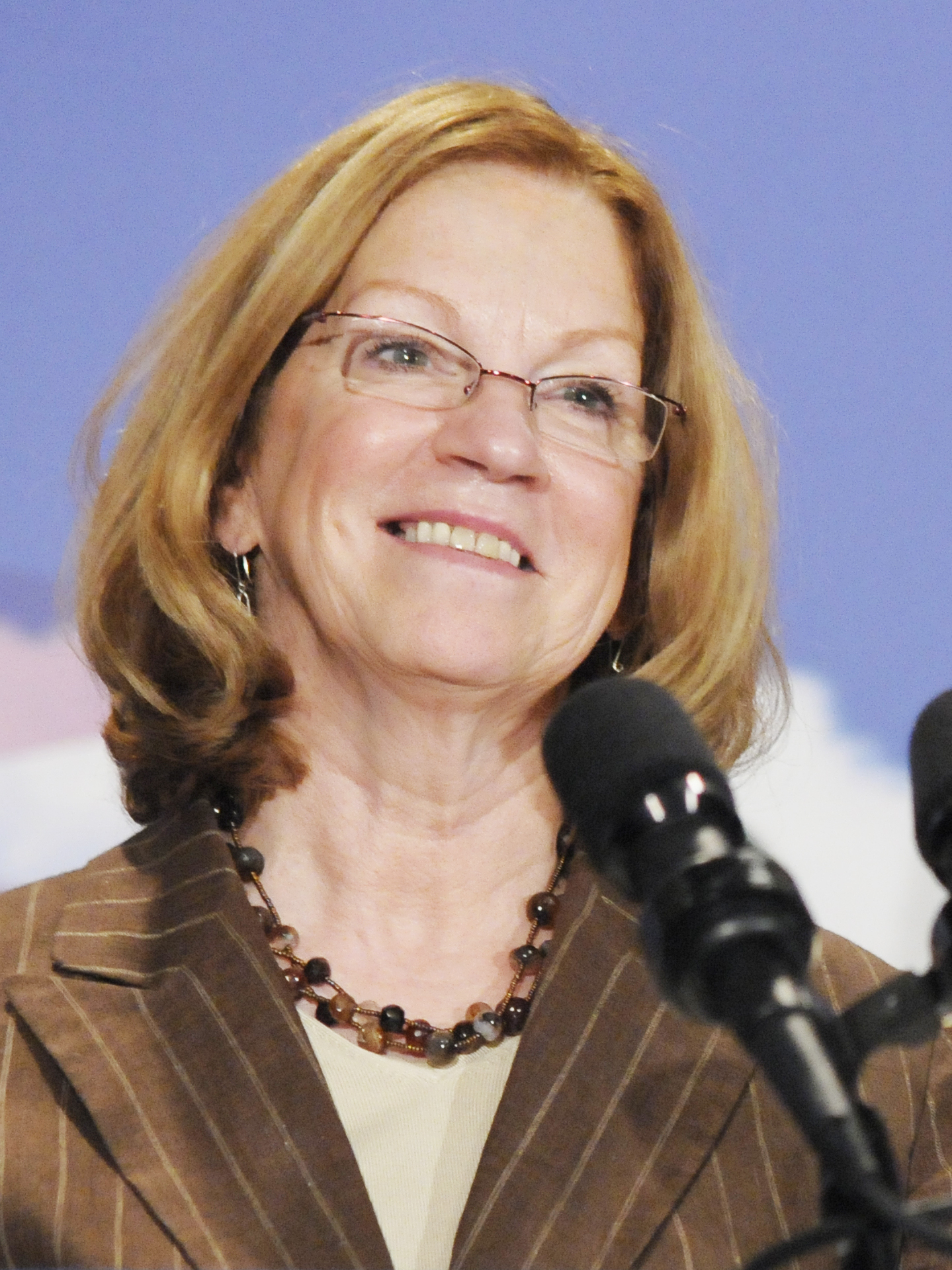
- Murray in 2008

President of the Massachusetts Senate
- In office March 21, 2007 – January 8, 2015
- Preceded by: Robert Travaglini
- Succeeded by: Stan Rosenberg

Member of the Massachusetts Senate from the Plymouth and Barnstable district
- In office January 1993 – January 8, 2015
- Preceded by: Edward Kirby
- Succeeded by: Vinny deMacedo

Personal details
- Born: October 10, 1947 (age 79) Boston, Massachusetts, U.S.
- Party: Democratic
- Children: One daughter
- Education: El Camino College; Northeastern University; University of Massachusetts, Boston

Therese Murray (born October 10, 1947 in Boston) is an American politician who served as President of the Massachusetts Senate from 2007 to 2015. Murray, a Democrat, was the first woman to lead a house of the Massachusetts General Court. She represented the Plymouth and Barnstable district in the Massachusetts Senate from 1993 to 2015.

== Early career ==
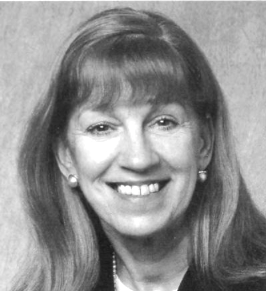
Official portrait, circa 2005

Murray attended Northeastern University in Massachusetts and El Camino College in California. She has a management certification from the University of Massachusetts Boston. She was first elected to the Massachusetts Senate in 1992. She chaired the Joint Committee on Human Services and Elder Affairs (1993–1999), the Joint Committee on Insurance (2000–2003), and the Senate Ways and Means Committee (2003–2007).

Some of Murray's major accomplishments throughout her career include Welfare Reform in 1995; a DSS overhaul in 1997; the consolidation of child care services in 1998; Mental Health Parity legislation in 2000; the Catastrophic Illness in Children Relief Fund in 2001; proposing Smart Growth affordable housing in 2004; Chapter 70 education funding reform in 2006; and a health care cost control bill in 2008 to improve cost reporting and transparency, and promote electronic medical records and uniform billing. Throughout her career, Murray has been a driving force behind children's issues and health care reform efforts, and she helped pass landmark legislation including Children's Mental Health and the Health Care Reform Act of 2006.

== Senate presidency ==
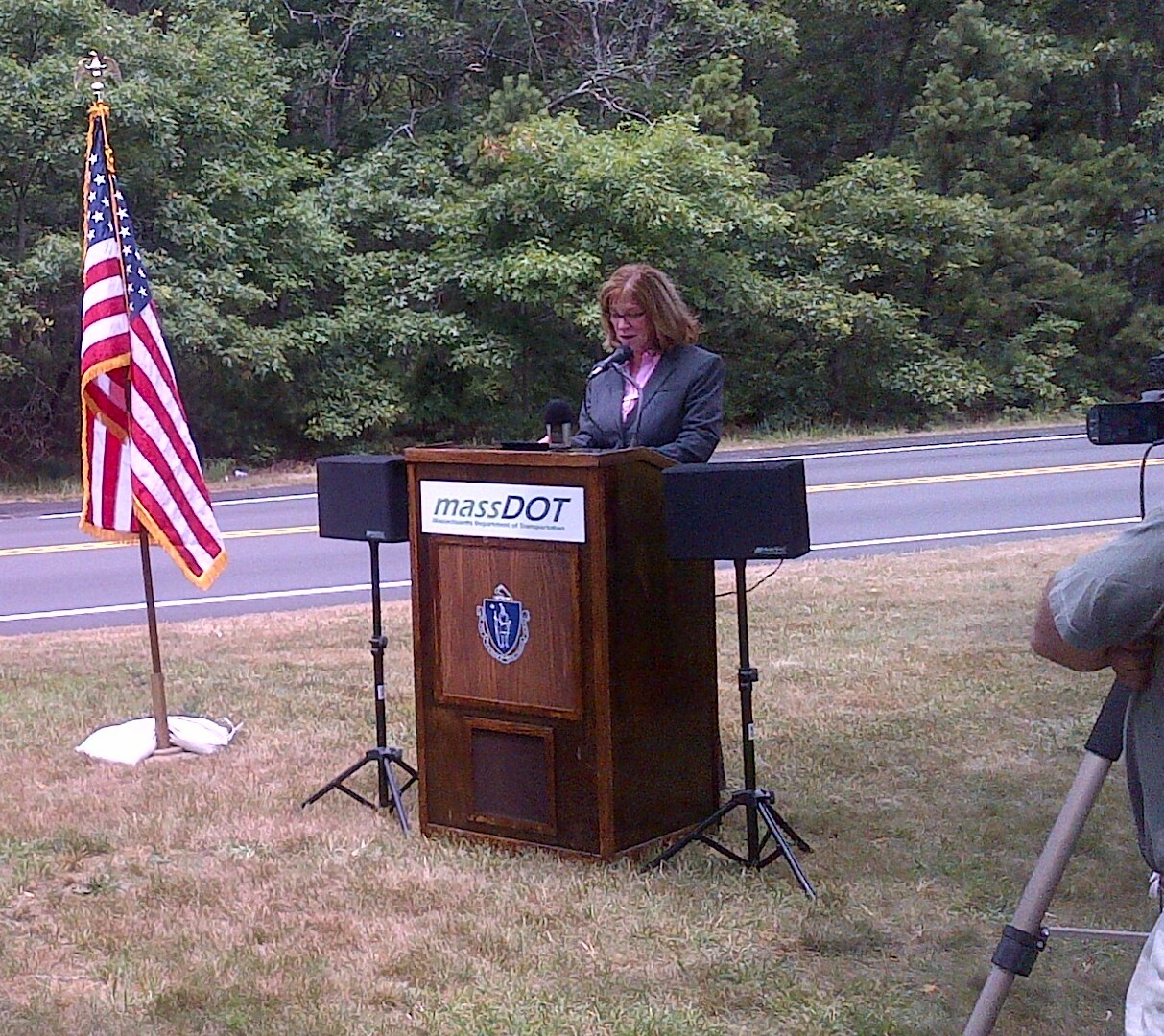
Murray speaking at an event in Sandwich, Massachusetts in 2012

Murray became Senate President in 2007. She was the first women to serve as Senate President in Massachusetts. She co-authored and passed legislation in 2009 to restructure the state transportation system; oversaw a comprehensive string of reforms, including improvements in the state pension system, and our ethics, lobbying and campaign finance laws; and in 2010 passed an economic development bill and small business legislation to streamline state agencies, reduce operating costs and create new opportunities for investment and growth.

In 2011, Murray continued to lead the Senate's reform agenda, overseeing legislation to reorganize the Trial Court and Probation Department and establish a transparent hiring process, and authoring fundamental changes in how state government operates with legislation that updates antiquated state finance laws and implements performance measurement requirements for all agencies and programs. Murray is also looking ahead to additional health care reforms that will change the current payment model to provide better care and bring down costs.

Term limits meant Murray could not serve as Senate President beyond 2015. Consequently, she considered whether to run for re-election to the Senate or run for Governor of Massachusetts in 2014. Instead she chose to retire and was succeeded by Vinny deMacedo.

=== Campaign contributors ===
In 2008 Murray was the top Massachusetts state legislative official recipient of lobbyist donations. According to campaign finance reports, casino lobbying interests were among the largest special interest group donating to Murray in 2009.

== Personal life ==
Murray is a resident of Plymouth and the mother of one daughter.

== See also ==
- 1993–1994 Massachusetts legislature
- 1995–1996 Massachusetts legislature
- 1997–1998 Massachusetts legislature
- 1999–2000 Massachusetts legislature
- 2001–2002 Massachusetts legislature
- 2003–2004 Massachusetts legislature
- 2005–2006 Massachusetts legislature
- 2007–2008 Massachusetts legislature
- 2009–2010 Massachusetts legislature
- 2011–2012 Massachusetts legislature
- 2013–2014 Massachusetts legislature

Political offices
Preceded by Robert Travaglini	President of the Massachusetts Senate; 2007–2015	Succeeded by Stan Rosenberg
Preceded by Mark Montigny	Chairman of the Massachusetts Senate Ways and Means Committee; 2003–2007	Succeeded by Steven C. Panagiotakos
