= Daniel K. Webster =

American politician

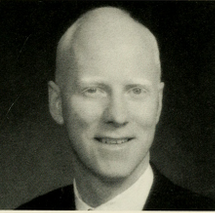
- Portrait of Daniel K. Webster

Member of the Massachusetts House of Representatives from the 6th Plymouth District
- In office January 2003 – January 2, 2013
- Preceded by: Francis L. Marini
- Succeeded by: Josh S. Cutler

Personal details
- Born: April 2, 1964 (age 62) Stoughton, Massachusetts
- Party: Republican
- Education: Colby College (B.A.); Suffolk University (J.D.)
- Occupation: Attorney; Politician

Daniel K. Webster (born April 2, 1964 in Stoughton, Massachusetts) is an American attorney and politician who represented the 6th Plymouth District in the Massachusetts House of Representatives from 2003 to 2013. Webster is a graduate of Colby College in Maine and Suffolk University Law School in Boston.
