= Mark Carron =

American politician

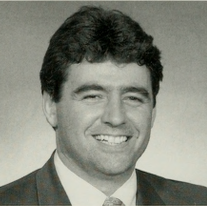

Member of the Massachusetts House of Representatives from the 6th Worcester District
- In office 1999–2007
- Preceded by: David Peters
- Succeeded by: Geraldo Alicea

Personal details
- Born: July 8, 1962 (age 64) Springfield, Massachusetts
- Died: October 18th 2025 Warren, Massachusetts
- Party: Democratic
- Education: Springfield College; Worcester State College
- Occupation: Politician

Mark J. Carron (born July 8, 1962, in Springfield, Massachusetts) was an American politician who represented the 6th Worcester District in the Massachusetts House of Representatives from 1999 to 2007 and was a member of the Southbridge, Massachusetts Town Council from 1996 to 1999.

In 2012, Carron was ordered to serve 6 months of a 2-year jail sentence for driving while under the influence of alcohol. Carron had previously been convicted of drunken driving in 1987 and 1991.

On October 18, 2025 Carron died unexpectedly at his home.
