= Thomas Finneran =

American radio talk host and politician (born 1950)

Tom Finneran
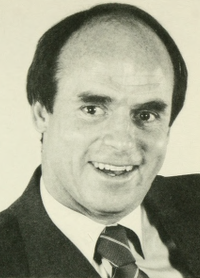
- Thomas Finneran, 1995

83rd Speaker of the Massachusetts House of Representatives
- In office April 9, 1996 – September 28, 2004
- Preceded by: Charles Flaherty
- Succeeded by: Salvatore DiMasi

Member of the Massachusetts House of Representatives from Suffolk County
- In office January 4, 1979 – September 28, 2004
- Preceded by: Royal L. Bolling Jr.
- Succeeded by: Linda Dorcena Forry
- Constituency: 15th Suffolk (1979–1989); 13th Suffolk (1989–1995); 12th Suffolk (1995–2004)

Personal details
- Born: Thomas Michael Finneran; January 2, 1950 (age 76) Boston, Massachusetts
- Party: Democratic
- Spouse: Donna Kelley
- Education: Northeastern University; Boston College Law School
- Occupation: Former lawyer (disbarred); Politician; Radio host

Thomas Michael "Tom" Finneran (born January 27, 1950), is a radio talk host and former Massachusetts Democratic politician who served as Speaker of the Massachusetts House of Representatives from April 1996 to September 2004. He represented the district that included parts of the Boston neighborhoods of Dorchester, Mattapan and Hyde Park as well as parts of the town of Milton for 26 years.

He resigned and accepted the position of President of the Massachusetts Biotechnology Council. He subsequently resigned in 2007 after pleading guilty to criminal obstruction of justice, in a court case about his testimony about his influence and participation in the redistricting process following the 2000 census. He was disbarred in 2010 (retroactive to January 23, 2007). From February 2007 to May 2012, he co-hosted a talk radio morning drive slot with WRKO.

== Early life and family ==
Finneran's parents were William, a carpet cleaner, and his wife Mary (b. 1920). He is the fourth of seven children (five brothers and two sisters). He and his wife Donna (née Kelley) have two daughters, Kelley and Shannon F. Mahoney of Milton, Massachusetts. He attended the Boston Latin School, graduated from Northeastern University in 1973 with a BA in business administration and finance, and received his JD from Boston College Law School.

== Massachusetts House of Representatives ==
Finneran was first elected to the Massachusetts House of Representatives in 1978. He became the 83rd Speaker of the Massachusetts House of Representatives in 1996, when he defeated Democratic Majority Leader Richard Voke, the favorite to win, by obtaining all 35 votes of the Republican caucus as well as 56 of 121 Democratic votes (91 of 158 votes in total).

As Speaker, he was known for his fiscal conservatism; he insisted on balanced budgets, and created that state's "rainy day fund." He was also known for having somewhat more conservative positions on some social issues than most Massachusetts Democrats, and for his autocratic leadership style, which earned him the nickname "King Tom" from some detractors. In his 2001 redistricting proposal, some believed that he attempted to strike back against some of his critics by trying to eliminate their districts. For example, his initial proposal would have combined Newton's two main House districts and would have forced incumbent Representatives Kay Khan and Ruth Balser to run against each other. Both Khan and Balser were vocal opponents of Finneran, and it was only after the protests of many women's advocacy groups that Finneran relented.

== Legislative redistricting and court case ==
After the 2000 U.S. census, in 2001 the Massachusetts House, under Finneran's leadership, drew up new House districts. The redistricting was challenged in Federal court, in a civil case, by the Black Political Task Force and others, as unfair to minority voters by constructing districts intended to favor white incumbents to the detriment of candidates preferred by blacks. In 2004, a three-judge Federal Court panel held that the redistricting plan violated section 2 of the Voting Rights Act of 1965 by discriminating against black voters. It held that 17 Massachusetts House districts were enjoined from being used in the 2004 election, that the legislature was given six weeks to create an acceptable plan for the districts, and the plaintiff Black Political Task Force could comment on proposed districts before being approved by the Court. In a footnote to the decision, the court criticized Finneran, implying that he misled the court when he testified that he had little involvement in the redistricting process. The court said "Although Speaker Finneran denied any involvement in the redistricting process, the circumstantial evidence strongly suggests the opposite conclusion." Finneran's attorney, Egbert, claimed that the statement was "simply wrong." (Under state law and House rules, Finneran was free to participate in drafting the legislative map before it was released.) Federal prosecutors indicted Finneran in June 2005 in a criminal case, charging him with perjury and obstruction of justice for misrepresenting his participation in the redistricting process. The indictment cited eight meetings that he held about redistricting.

== Obstruction of justice in legislative redistricting case ==
On January 5, 2007, prior to the start of the scheduled criminal trial Finneran pleaded guilty to one count of obstruction of justice in exchange for federal prosecutors' dropping perjury charges against him; the plea bargain allowed him to avoid jail time. Federal prosecutors and lawyers for Finneran recommended that the once-powerful figure on Beacon Hill receive 18 months of unsupervised probation and a $25,000 fine. In return, Finneran agreed not to run for any elected political position in state, federal or municipal government for five years after his sentencing date. The US Attorney's office agreed to dismiss three counts of perjury against Finneran.

On November 14, 2003, he made misleading and false statements under oath in US District Court, according to the agreement. The seven-page document, signed by Finneran on January 3, 2007, states, "Defendant expressly and unequivocally admits that he committed the crime so charged in the indictment, and that he is in fact guilty of the offense so charged in the indictment." Finneran faced 16 to 21 months in prison if he was convicted on all counts stemming from criminal charges that he misrepresented his role in the creation of a legislative redistricting map that diluted the clout of minority voters. Finneran lost his $30,000-a-year pension after his plea. A decision in 2006 by the state Supreme Judicial Court permitted a pension to be revoked in a similar case of breach of public trust. His attorney, Richard Egbert, has said Finneran never claimed he was totally uninvolved in the redistricting process and that he acknowledged in his testimony having about "half a dozen" conversations with leaders of the redistricting committee.

The Commonwealth of Massachusetts Retirement Board voted in October 2012, that Finneran was not entitled to a government pension of about $32,900 a year due to his conviction of obstruction of justice in 2007. Finneran appealed the Retirement Board decision to the Boston Municipal Court where a judge reversed the Board's decision, concluding that Finneran's conviction did not bear "a direct factual link to his position as a House Member and/or Speaker[.]" On April 5, 2017, the Supreme Judicial Court reversed that decision and reinstated the decision of the Retirement Board, holding that "[s]imply put, it is only because he had been Speaker of the House at the relevant time that he was in a position to testify as to the genesis of the redistricting plan and to do so falsely. This connection is enough to warrant forfeiture" under the relevant Massachusetts statute, General Law c. 32, § 15(4).

As the result of Finneran's criminal convictions, he was also disbarred (license to practice law revoked) by the Massachusetts Board of Bar Overseers.

== President of Massachusetts Biotechnology Council ==
Finneran served as president of the Massachusetts Biotechnology Council since he resigned from the Massachusetts House of Representatives in 2004 until January 8, 2007. The council is a non-profit organization with more than 500 corporate and academic members, promoting, and supporting the state's biotechnology industry. It has been observed that Finneran's value to the council has been primarily to be out of office, as Finneran was a vigorous and powerful opponent of stem cell research and repeatedly blocked legislative efforts to support stem cell research in Massachusetts. Finneran's reported salary was $416,000 a year. On January 8, 2007, less than a week after the plea agreement, Finneran resigned from Biotechnology Council; the council unanimously accepted his resignation. Finneran had been praised as a highly effective lobbyist; his resignation permitted an internal debate about having a felon for the council's president to end.

== Later life ==
On March 9, 2009, by a vote of 11 to 1, the state Board of Bar Overseers recommended that former House Speaker and WRKO radio host Thomas M. Finneran be disbarred for his conviction on a federal charge of obstruction of justice. On January 11, 2010, the Massachusetts Supreme Judicial Court revoked Finneran's license to practice law in the Commonwealth, rejecting an alternative penalty proposed by Finneran's lawyer of a two-year license suspension. His disbarment was retroactive to January 23, 2007 (the date on which he was suspended).

On January 11, 2007, Finneran was announced as the morning drive-time host on the Boston WRKO radio station, replacing Scott Allen Miller. On Tuesday May 28, 2012 it was announced that Tom Finneran will end his radio career at Entercom Communications WRKO in Boston, effective Thursday May 31, 2012 (his last broadcast date). In a statement, Finneran said he was not able to keep up with the hours to host a well-informed show.

On March 5, 2017, the state's highest court has ruled that former Speaker of the House Tom Finneran has to forfeit his pension, ending a years-long battle the former pol waged to keep his $33,000-a-year benefit. The Supreme Judicial Court overturned a district court order, ruling that Finneran's conviction for providing false testimony in a federal civil suit over the House's redistricting plan was directly linked to his job as speaker. That connection, the court decided, meant the State Retirement Board was right in stripping him of his annual pension. Finneran pleaded guilty in 2007 to one count of obstruction of justice. "Finneran's conduct falls squarely within ... requiring forfeiture where there is a direct factual link between the public employee's position and the offense," the court wrote. "Finneran's false testimony concerning his knowledge of and participation in the redistricting planning process is in at least two respects directly linked as a factual matter to his position as Speaker of the House." Finneran's pension is valued at about $470,000, according to court papers, including $240,000 the state would have owed him if the SJC upheld the district court order.

== See also ==
- 1979–1980 Massachusetts legislature
- 1981–1982 Massachusetts legislature
- 1983–1984 Massachusetts legislature
- 1985–1986 Massachusetts legislature
- 1987–1988 Massachusetts legislature
- 1989–1990 Massachusetts legislature
- 1991–1992 Massachusetts legislature
- 1993–1994 Massachusetts legislature
- 1995–1996 Massachusetts legislature
- 1997–1998 Massachusetts legislature
- 1999–2000 Massachusetts legislature
- 2001–2002 Massachusetts legislature
- 2003–2004 Massachusetts legislature

Massachusetts House of Representatives
Preceded by Royal Bolling, Jr.	Member of the Massachusetts House of Representatives from the 15th Suffolk district January 4, 1979–January 4, 1989	Succeeded by Angelo Scaccia
Preceded by W. Paul White	Member of the Massachusetts House of Representatives from the 13th Suffolk district January 4, 1989–January 4, 1995	Succeeded by James T. Brett
Preceded by John E. McDonough	Member of the Massachusetts House of Representatives from the 12th Suffolk district January 4, 1995–September 28, 2004	Succeeded by Linda Dorcena Forry
Preceded by Charles Flaherty	Speaker of the Massachusetts House of Representatives; April 9, 1996–September 28, 2004	Succeeded by Salvatore DiMasi
