= Mary Jane Simmons =

American politician

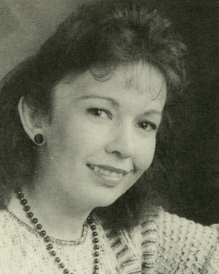

Member of the Massachusetts House of Representatives from the 4th Worcester district district
- In office 1993–2004

Personal details
- Born: May 14, 1953
- Died: August 13, 2004 (aged 51)

Mary Jane Simmons (May 14, 1953 – August 13, 2004) was an American Democratic politician from Leominster, Massachusetts. She represented the 4th Worcester district in the Massachusetts House of Representatives from 1993 to 2004.

== See also ==
- 1993-1994 Massachusetts legislature
- 1995-1996 Massachusetts legislature
- 1997-1998 Massachusetts legislature
- 1999-2000 Massachusetts legislature
- 2001-2002 Massachusetts legislature
- 2003-2004 Massachusetts legislature
