= Massachusetts House of Representatives' 6th Plymouth district =

American legislative district

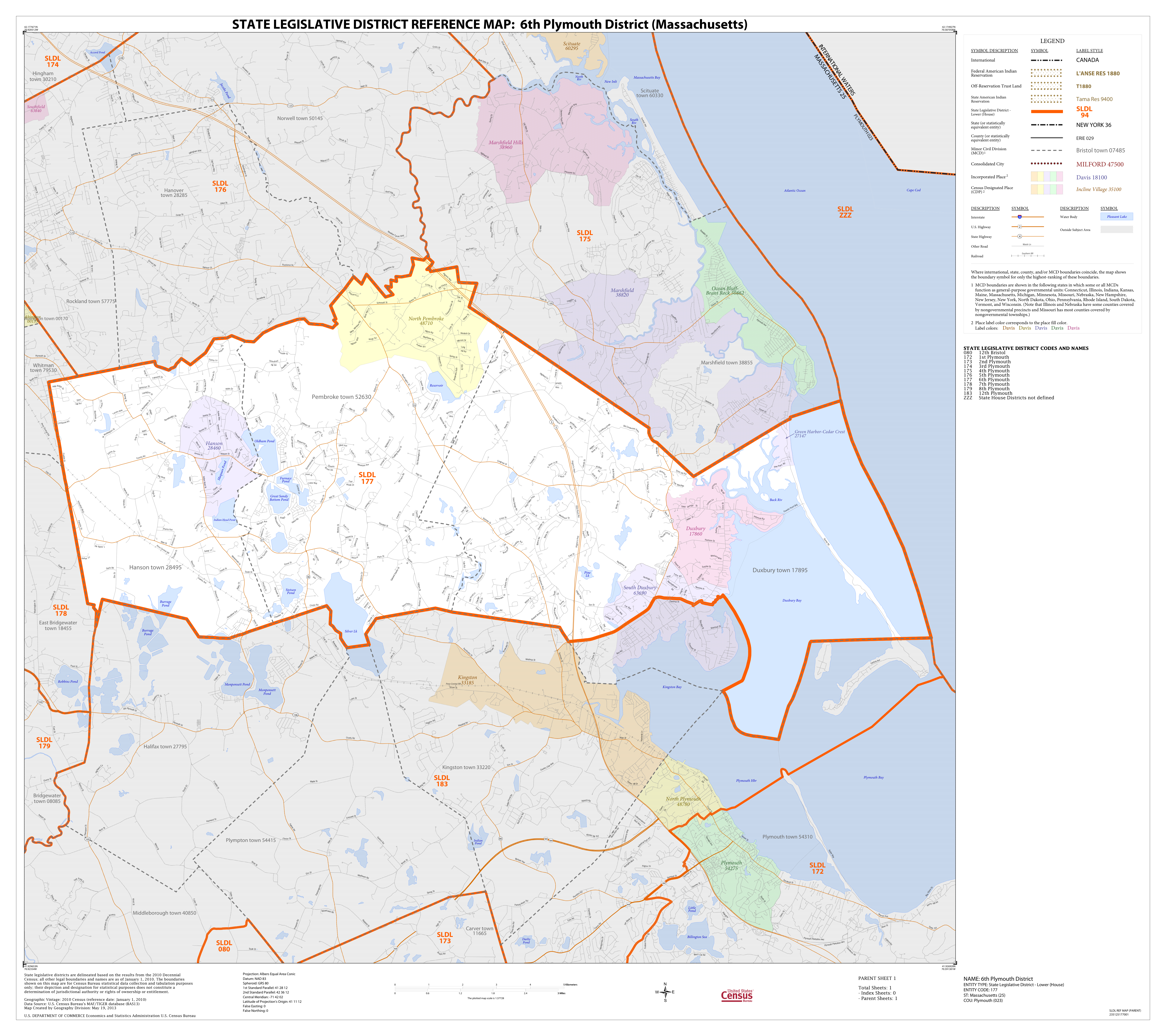
Map of Massachusetts House of Representatives' 6th Plymouth district, based on the 2010 United States census.

Massachusetts House of Representatives' 6th Plymouth district in the United States is one of 160 legislative districts included in the lower house of the Massachusetts General Court. It covers part of Plymouth County. Republican Kenneth Sweezey of Pembroke has represented this district since January 2025 after winning the 2024 election to the State House.

== Towns represented ==
The district includes the following localities:

- all of Duxbury
- part of Halifax
- part of Hanson
- part of Marshfield
- part of Pembroke

The current district geographic boundary overlaps with those of the Massachusetts Senate's 2nd Plymouth and Bristol district, Plymouth and Barnstable district, and Plymouth and Norfolk district.

=== Former locales ===
The district previously covered:

- Carver, circa 1872
- Plymouth, circa 1872
- Plympton, circa 1872

== Representatives ==
- John B. Collingwood, circa 1858
- Rufus C. Freeman, circa 1858
- Samuel H. Doten, circa 1859
- Eleazer C. Sherman, circa 1859
- Harvey H. Pratt, circa 1888
- Frank E. Barrows, circa 1920
- Alton Hamilton Worrall, circa 1951
- Alfred Almeida, circa 1975
- Charles W. Mann
- Francis L. Marini
- Daniel K. Webster
- Josh S. Cutler, 2013-2024
- Kenneth Sweezey, 2025-present

== See also ==
- List of Massachusetts House of Representatives elections
- Other Plymouth County districts of the Massachusetts House of Representatives: 1st, 2nd, 3rd, 4th, 5th, 7th, 8th, 9th, 10th, 11th, 12th
- List of Massachusetts General Courts
- List of former districts of the Massachusetts House of Representatives

== Images ==
Portraits of legislators

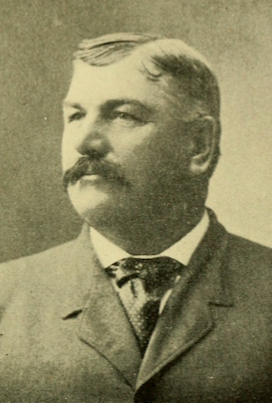
Eugene Shaw

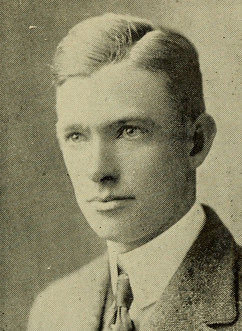
James Kiernan

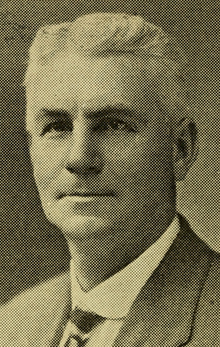
Frank Barrows

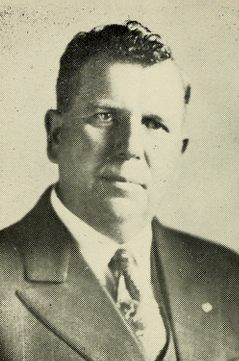
Orvis Kinney

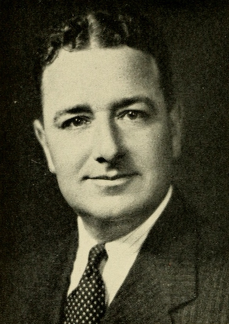
George Stetson

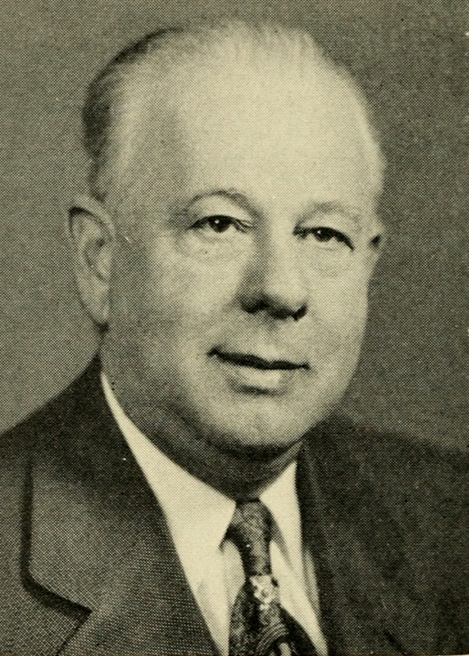
Alton Hamilton Worrall

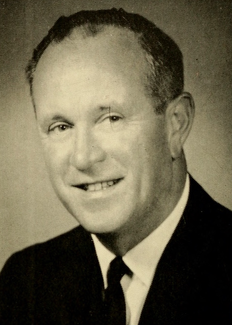
Charles MacKenzie

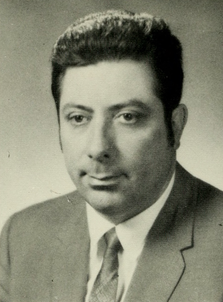
Alfred Almeida

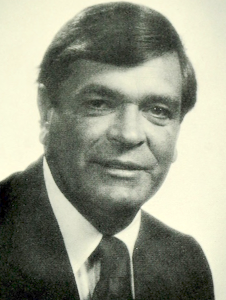
Charles Mann

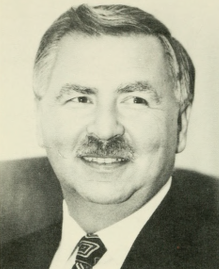
Francis Marini

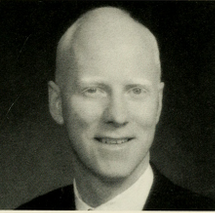
Daniel Webster
