= Stan Rosenberg =

American politician (born 1949)

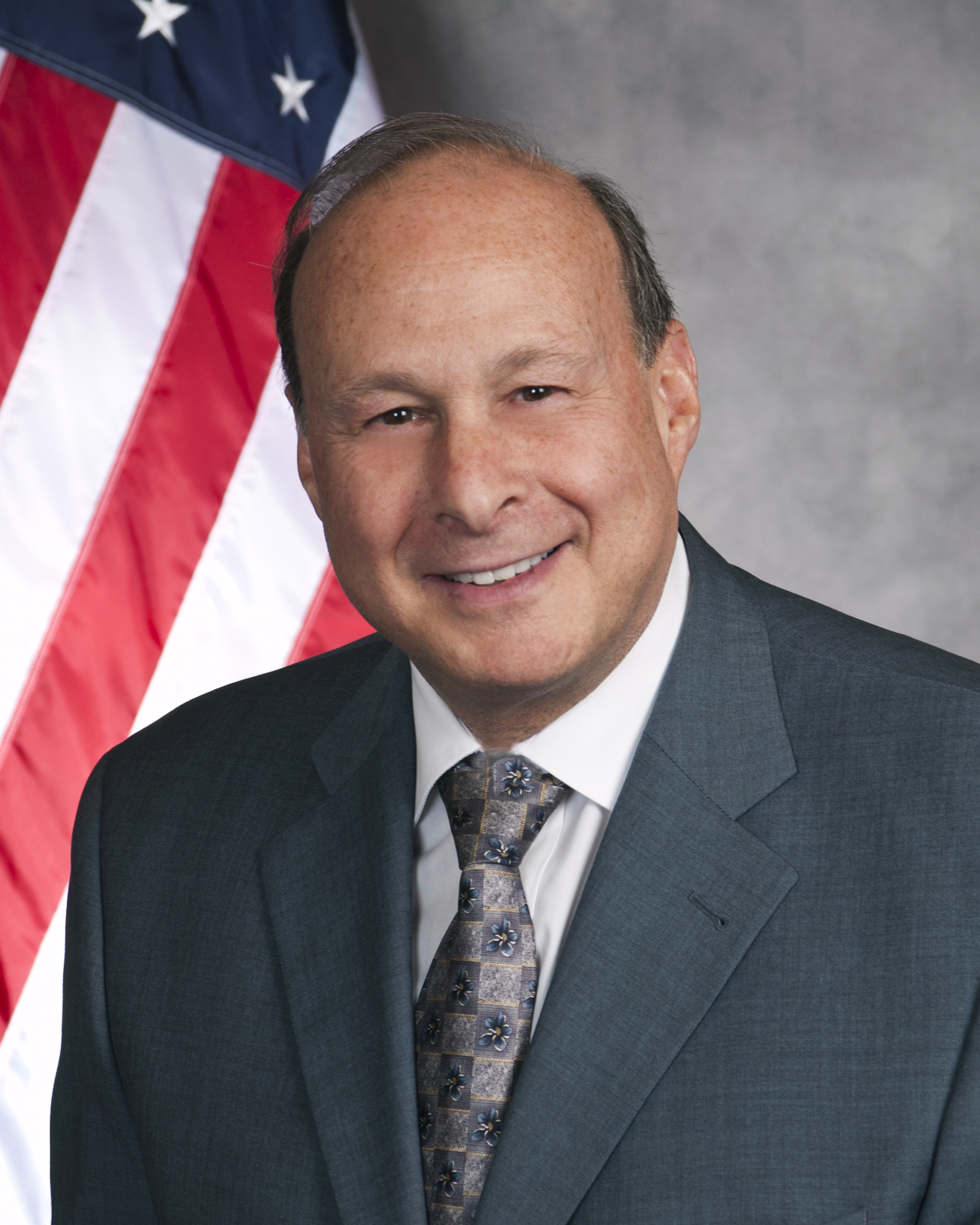
- official portrait, 2011

President of the Massachusetts Senate
- In office January 8, 2015 – December 4, 2017
- Preceded by: Therese Murray
- Succeeded by: Harriette L. Chandler

Majority Leader of the Massachusetts Senate
- In office January 31, 2013 – January 8, 2015
- Preceded by: Frederick Berry
- Succeeded by: Harriete Chandler

President pro tempore of the Massachusetts Senate
- In office January 2003 – January 31, 2013
- Preceded by: Position established
- Succeeded by: Richard Moore

Member of the Massachusetts Senate from the Hampshire, Franklin and Worcester district
- In office January 1991 – May 4, 2018
- Preceded by: John Olver
- Succeeded by: Jo Comerford

Member of the Massachusetts House of Representatives from the 3rd Hampshire district
- In office January 1987 – January 1991
- Preceded by: James Collins
- Succeeded by: Ellen Story

Personal details
- Born: October 12, 1949 (age 76) Revere, Massachusetts, U.S.
- Party: Democratic
- Spouse: Bryon Hefner (m. 2016; sep. 2018)
- Education: University of Massachusetts, Amherst (BA)
- Website: Official website

Stanley C. Rosenberg (born October 12, 1949) is an American politician who served as President of the Massachusetts Senate from January 2015 until December 2017. Rosenberg was elected to the Massachusetts House of Representatives in 1986 and served as the representative for Amherst and Pelham until 1991 when he won a special election for the State Senate seat being vacated by Congressman John Olver. A Democrat, Rosenberg resigned from the Senate on May 4, 2018, amidst a sexual harassment scandal involving his husband, Bryon Hefner.

== Education ==
Rosenberg first lived in Malden and Revere becoming a foster child as a toddler and raised in foster care. He is a 1967 graduate of Revere High School, where he was in the band and participated in many clubs and groups. He attended the University of Massachusetts Amherst and operated a hot dog cart as a self supporting student and played the tuba in the marching band. He went on to graduate in 1977 with a degree in Arts Administration and Community Development.

== Early career ==
While attending UMass Amherst, he founded and became the first director of the Arts Extension Service and then transitioned to becoming director of the Community Development and Human Service Programs in the Division of Continuing Education. Rosenberg was a member of the University of Massachusetts Minuteman Marching Band where he played the tuba, and was a Brother of Kappa Kappa Psi. Subsequently, Rosenberg worked as an aide to then-state Senator John Olver from 1980 to 1983. He also served as an Executive Director of the Massachusetts Democratic Party from 1983 to 1985, and as the district director for Congressman Chester G. Atkins from 1985 to 1986.

== Legislative career ==
While in the Senate, Rosenberg served as Chair of the Election Laws Committee (1991–1993), Chair of the Banking Committee (1993–1996), Chair of Senate Ways and Means Committee (1996–1999), and Assistant Majority Leader (1999–2002). He was the Senate's first President Pro Tempore from 2003–2013, and was appointed Senate Majority Leader by Senate President Therese Murray on January 31, 2013, becoming the highest ranking LGBT elected official in the Commonwealth.

On January 7, 2015 he was unanimously elected President of the Massachusetts Senate of the 189th General Court.

During the 187th General Court, he served as the Senate Chair of the Special Joint Committee on Redistricting following the 2000 and 2010 US Census. Rosenberg was also a key architect in the battle for same-sex marriage in Massachusetts.

Rosenberg is also a founder and co-chair of the Massachusetts Legislature's Foster Kid Caucus, the first of its kind in the nation. The caucus seeks to improve the conditions and address issues related to foster and adopted children.

Rosenberg has also been heavily involved in Pskov, Russia where he, and other members of the Legislature and professional community have been traveling for over 15 years in an effort to foster goodwill and encourage economic, social, and political progress. He is also an active member of both the Council of State Governments and Americans for the Arts.

=== Towns represented ===
In Hampshire County: Northampton, Amherst, Hadley, Hatfield, Pelham, South Hadley.

In Franklin County: Bernardston, Colrain, Deerfield, Erving, Gill, Greenfield, Leverett, Leyden, Montague, New Salem, Northfield, Orange, Shelburne, Shutesbury, Sunderland, Warwick, Wendell and Whately.

In Worcester County: Royalston.

=== Current committee membership ===
Rosenberg is not a member of any committees in the current General Court.

== Bryon Hefner scandal ==
In November 2017, it was reported that four men accused Rosenberg's estranged husband, Bryon Hefner, of sexual harassment, allegedly willing to trade his influence with Rosenberg in return for sexual favors. In December 2017, Rosenberg voluntarily stepped down as Senate President while an ethics probe into his possible role in the scandal began. Also in December 2017, The Boston Globe reported that the Federal Bureau of Investigation had opened an investigation of the matter.

On March 29, 2018, a state grand jury indicted Rosenberg's husband, Bryon Hefner, on charges of sexual assault, criminal lewdness, and distributing nude photographs without consent. Hefner faced the possibility of two years in a county jail and to up to five years in state prison.

On April 24, 2018, Hefner appeared in Suffolk Superior Court and pled not guilty to five counts of sexual assault, four counts of distributing nude images without consent, and one count of criminal lewdness. He was ordered not to enter the Massachusetts State House or to contact witnesses or victims.

On May 3, 2018, Rosenberg announced that he was resigning from the Senate, effective at 5 p.m. EDT on May 4. According to Boston.com, this announcement followed the release of an ethics report that claimed that Rosenberg "violated policy by giving Hefner access to his Senate email account despite a promise to his colleagues that he would build a firewall between his personal and professional life," and recommended that Rosenberg be barred from leadership positions through 2020.

In June 2018, a civil lawsuit was filed in the state of Massachusetts saying that Hefner sexually assaulted the plaintiff and alleged that Rosenberg "knew or was aware" that Hefner posed a risk to others and he continually allowed Hefner access to lobbyists, State House staff members, and others. The lawsuit does not ask for specific damages on any of the six counts.

In September 2019, Hefner pleaded guilty to three counts, including indecent assault and battery, assault and battery and dissemination of a nude image. He was sentenced to three years on probation and required to register as a sex offender.

== Personal life ==
Rosenberg currently resides in Amherst. He was one of five openly LGBT members of the Massachusetts General Court, alongside Representatives Sarah Peake (D–Provincetown), Kate Hogan (D–Stow), Denise Andrews (D–Orange) and Liz Malia (D–Jamaica Plain).

In January 2018, it was announced that Rosenberg and Hefner had separated while Hefner undergoes treatment for substance abuse issues.

== See also ==
- Massachusetts legislature: 1987–1988, 1989–1990, 1991–1992, 1993–1994, 1995–1996, 1997–1998, 1999–2000, 2001–2002, 2003–2004, 2005–2006, 2007–2008, 2009–2010, 2011–2012, 2013–2014, 2015–2016, 2017–2018

Massachusetts Senate
New office	President pro tempore of the Massachusetts Senate; 2003–2013	Succeeded by Richard Moore
Preceded by Frederick Berry	Majority Leader of the Massachusetts Senate; 2013–2015	Succeeded by Harriete Chandler
Political offices
Preceded by Therese Murray	President of the Massachusetts Senate; 2015–2017	Succeeded by Harriete Chandler
