= Thomas N. George =

American politician (1938–2025)

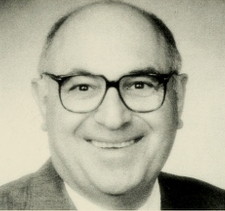
- Portrait of Thomas N. George

Member of the Massachusetts House of Representatives from the 1st Barnstable district
- In office January 1, 1997 – January 5, 2005
- Preceded by: Edward B. Teague III
- Succeeded by: Cleon Turner

Personal details
- Born: May 2, 1938 Worcester, Massachusetts, U.S.
- Died: October 16, 2025 (aged 87) Yarmouth Port, Massachusetts, U.S.
- Party: Republican
- Education: University of Massachusetts Amherst; New England School of Law
- Profession: Attorney; Entrepreneur

Thomas Nicholas George (May 2, 1938 – October 16, 2025) was an American politician who represented the First Barnstable District in the Massachusetts House of Representatives from 1997 to 2005. He served 25 years as the Town Moderator of Yarmouth, Massachusetts.

George died on October 16, 2025, at the age of 87.
