= Lida E. Harkins =

American politician

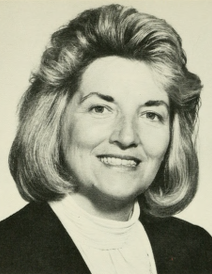
- Lida E. Harkins, circa 1995

House Representative for the 13th Norfolk District
- In office 1989–2011

Personal details
- Born: Lida Eisenstadt McMahon; January 24, 1944 (age 82) Jersey City, New Jersey, USA
- Children: 3
- Education: Regis College; Boston College

Lida Eisenstadt Harkins (née McMahon; born January 24, 1944) is a Massachusetts retired politician who served as a member of the Massachusetts House of Representatives from 1989 to 2011.

== Early life ==
Harkins was born on January 24, 1944 in Jersey City, New Jersey to Paul and Lida McMahon. Her father worked as an executive at General Motors, while her mother worked as an executive assistant for several high-tech firms and for the Middlesex County Sheriff’s office. She attended Marian High School in Framingham, MA. She graduated from Regis College in 1966 with a degree in Education and in 1987, went on to Boston College’s Graduate Studies Program: Women in Politics and Government. Harkins was the first graduate of Boston College's Women in Politics and Government program to be elected to the Massachusetts General Court. She has lived in Needham for 35 years, and has three children and twelve grandchildren.

== Political career ==
Prior to being elected to the legislature, Harkins served six years on the Needham School Committee and directed a collaborative vocational training program for 13 towns in the Metrowest area. She is also a former elementary school teacher.

Harkins served in the Massachusetts House of Representatives as the Representative from the 13th Norfolk District, which comprises the towns Needham, Dover and Medfield. Harkins was first elected in 1989, and was the House Majority Whip from 2001 to 2008. Her priorities included public education, improving health care access, and generating economic development.

Harkins was appointed House Majority Whip by former Speaker of the House Thomas Finneran in 2001. Before her appointment, she served as the Assistant Majority Whip and the House Chairman of the Joint Committee on Education Arts and Humanities. Harkins also served as the Chairman of the House Committee on Science and Technology, the House Chairman of the Joint Committee on Housing and Urban Development, Vice-Chairman of the Committee on Commerce and Labor, Co-Chairman of the bi-partisan Women’s Caucus and as a member of the Committee on Ways and Means, and Public Safety. She has also chaired the Special Education Study Commission created in the 1997 state budget and the Special Commission that reformed and restructured the School Building Assistance Program.

Harkins ran for the Massachusetts Senate in 2010, to fill the vacancy left by State Senator Scott Brown after he was elected to the United States Senate. She was unsuccessful, losing the primary election to challenger Peter Smulowitz.

== Other activities ==
Harkins currently chairs the Needham Democratic Town Committee, as well as being a board member of the Charles River Center. She also hosts the Needham community access program, Citizen's Roll Call, a series where Massachusetts officials join her to discuss issues of the day. Previous guests included Congressman Stephen Lynch and Representative Peter Koutoujian, the House Chair of Public Health.

In 2024, Harkins served as a presidential elector for the 2024 United States presidential election.
