= Robert A. Antonioni =

American attorney and politician

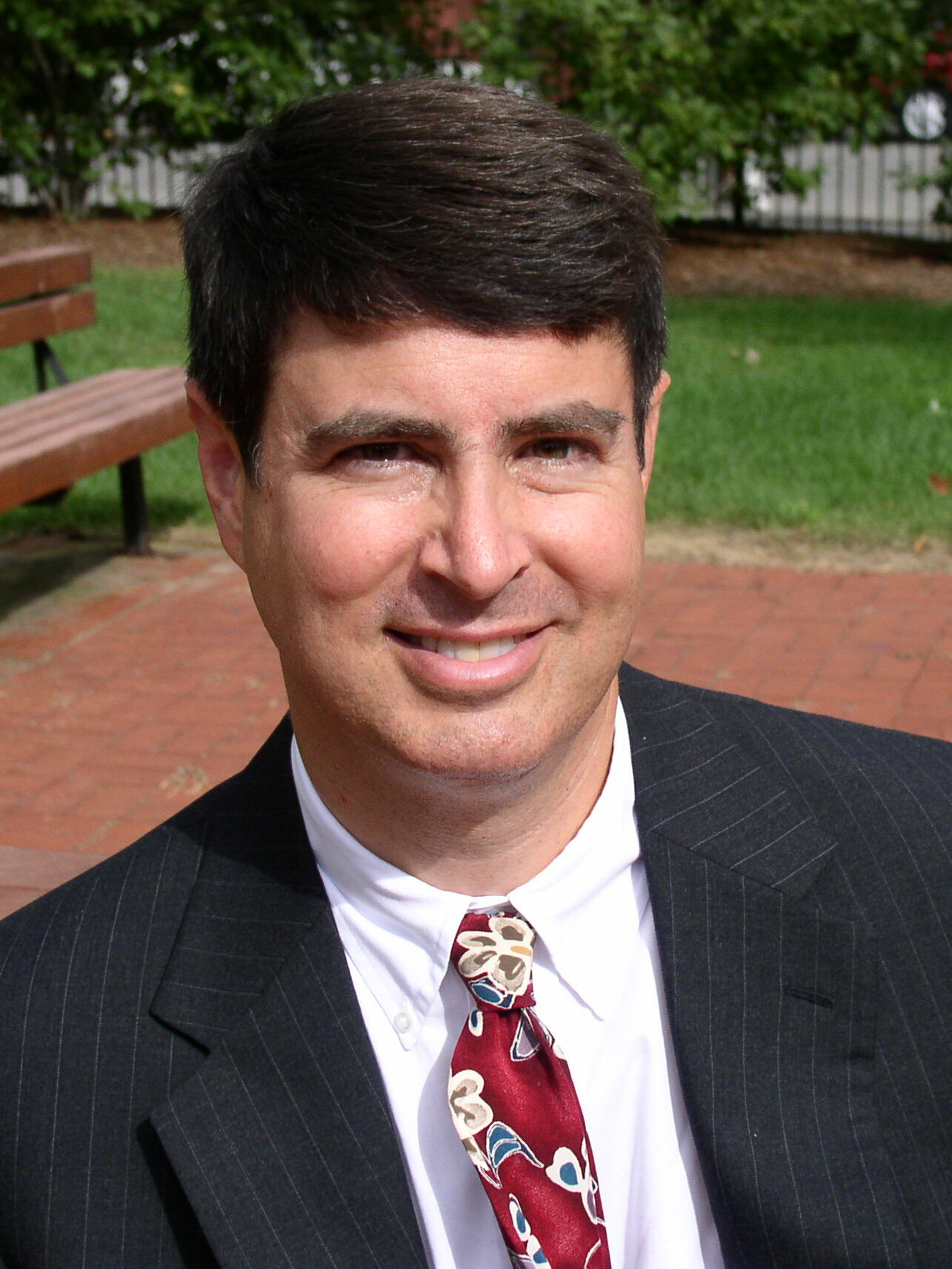

Member of the Massachusetts State Senate
- In office 1993–2009
- Preceded by: Mary L. Padula
- Succeeded by: Jennifer Flanagan

Massachusetts House of Representatives from the 4th Worcester District
- In office 1989–1993
- Preceded by: Angelo Picucci
- Succeeded by: Mary Jane Simmons

Personal details
- Born: July 15, 1958 (age 68) Leominster, Massachusetts, U.S.
- Party: Democratic
- Education: College of the Holy Cross (BA); New England School of Law (JD)
- Profession: Attorney

Robert A. Antonioni (born July 15, 1958) is an American attorney and politician who served in the Massachusetts General Court and on the Leominster City Council.

== Early life ==
Antonioni was born on July 15, 1958, in Leominster, Massachusetts. He graduated from the College of the Holy Cross and New England School of Law.

== Political career ==
Antonioni's political career began in 1985 when he ran for a seat on the Leominster City Council. In 1988, Antonioni was elected to the Massachusetts House of Representatives. Four years later he was elected to the Massachusetts Senate. In 2008, Antonioni announced that he was not seeking reelection. He was succeeded by Jennifer Flanagan.

== See also ==
- 1993–1994 Massachusetts legislature
- Massachusetts Senate's Worcester and Middlesex district
