= Edward B. Teague III =

American politician

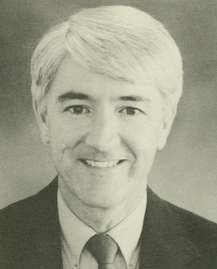

Minority Leader of the Massachusetts House of Representatives
- In office 1995–1997
- Preceded by: Peter Forman
- Succeeded by: David Peters

Member of the Massachusetts House of Representatives from the 1st Barnstable District
- In office 1989–1997
- Preceded by: Henri S. Rauschenbach
- Succeeded by: Thomas N. George

Personal details
- Born: November 25, 1949 (age 76) Lowell, Massachusetts
- Party: Republican
- Education: Saint Anselm College; Pepperdine University
- Occupation: Life Insurance Salesman; Radio Talk Show Host; Politician

Edward B. Teague III (born November 25, 1949 in Lowell, Massachusetts) is an American politician who represented the 1st Barnstable District in the Massachusetts House of Representatives from 1989 to 1997. From 1992 to 1993 he was the Assistant Minority Whip, from 1993 to 1995 he was the Minority Whip, and from 1995 to 1997 he was the House Minority Leader.

In the early 1990s, Teague was a conservative radio talk show host on WXTK-FM in Yarmouth, hosting the morning program. His 1994 run for re-election to the State House pitted him against Cathy Brown, a Democratic selectman in the neighboring town of Dennis who happened to host an afternoon talk show on the same radio station. Teague left the station in 1995.

In 1996 he was a candidate for the United States House of Representatives seat in Massachusetts's 10th congressional district held by the retiring Gerry Studds. He won the Republican nomination, but lost in general election to Bill Delahunt.

Teague has been clerk magistrate at Falmouth District Court since 2006, following his nomination and appointment by Governor Mitt Romney.
