= David Peters (politician) =

American politician

David M. Peters
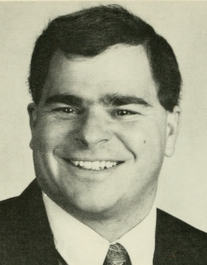
- Portrait of David M. Peters

Minority Leader of the Massachusetts House of Representatives
- In office 1997 – December 11, 1998
- Preceded by: Edward B. Teague III
- Succeeded by: Francis L. Marini

Member of the Massachusetts House of Representatives from the 6th Worcester District
- In office 1991 – December 11, 1998
- Preceded by: Marilyn Travinski
- Succeeded by: Mark Carron

Personal details
- Born: March 1, 1954 (age 72) Hartford, Connecticut
- Party: Republican
- Education: Bryant College
- Occupation: Politician

David M. Peters (born March 1, 1954, in Hartford, Connecticut) is an American politician who represented the 6th Worcester District in the Massachusetts House of Representatives from 1991 to 1998. From 1995 to 1997 he was the Minority Whip and from 1997 to 1999 he was the House Minority Leader. Peters was appointed Commissioner of the Division of Fisheries, Wildlife & Environmental Law Enforcement on December 12, 1998, and held that job until he was replaced by incoming Governor Mitt Romney in 2003.
