= John Binienda =

American politician

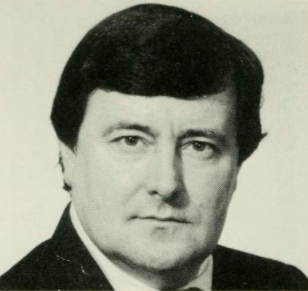
- John Binienda, 1997

Member of the Massachusetts House of Representatives
- In office 1987 – August 22, 2014
- Succeeded by: Kate Campanale

Personal details
- Born: John Joseph Binienda; June 22, 1947 Worcester, Massachusetts, U.S.
- Died: August 22, 2014 (aged 67) Worcester, Massachusetts, U.S.

John Joseph Binienda, Sr. (June 22, 1947 – August 22, 2014) was an American state legislator serving in the Massachusetts House of Representatives. He was a Worcester resident and a member of the Democratic Party. After serving 28 years in the House, Binienda died in 2014. He went to Quinsigamond Community College, Worcester State University, and then taught school in Leicester, Massachusetts. Binienda, who suffered from kidney disease and diabetes, was not seeking reelection due to his health. He had one daughter and two sons.

== See also ==
- 1993–1994 Massachusetts legislature
- Massachusetts's 17th Worcester House district
