= Harold Naughton Jr. =

American politician

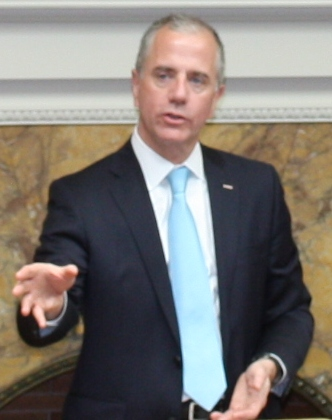

Member of the Massachusetts House of Representatives from the 12th Worcester District
- In office 1995–2021
- Preceded by: William Constantino Jr.
- Succeeded by: Meghan Kilcoyne

Personal details
- Party: Democratic
- Education: Assumption College; Suffolk University Law School (J.D.)
- Occupation: Attorney
- Awards: Combat Action Badge; Bronze Star Medal; Meritorious Service Medal; Afghan Campaign Medal; Iraq Campaign Medal; Army Commendation Medal; Army Achievement Medal; Army Reserve Combat Achievement Medal; National Defense Service Medal; Global War on Terrorism Expeditionary Medal; NATO Medal; Army Service Ribbon; Overseas Service Ribbon; Armed Forces Reserve Medal; Military Outstanding Volunteer Service Medal
- Website: Official website Campaign website

Military service
- Allegiance: United States of America
- Branch/service: U.S. Army Reserve
- Years of service: 2001–present
- Rank: Lieutenant colonel
- Unit: Judge Advocate General's Corps; 2nd Brigade Combat Team, 4th Infantry Division
- Battles/wars: Iraq War; War in Afghanistan

Harold "Hank" P. Naughton Jr. is an American politician. He is a state legislator who served in the Massachusetts House of Representatives from 1995 to 2021. He is a member of the Democratic Party.

Naughton is a lieutenant colonel in the Army Reserves. He has served as an Army JAG in both Iraq and Afghanistan where he saw combat. He has been awarded the Combat Action Badge, among other military awards.

On October 24, 2013, Naughton announced his candidacy for Attorney General of Massachusetts. He dropped out of the race in March 2014 and ran for reelection to the House instead. He did not run for reelection to a fourteenth term in 2020.

== Education and legal career ==
Naughton attended public schools in Clinton, Massachusetts and went on to earn his Bachelor's at Assumption College in 1982. He earned his Juris Doctor from Suffolk University School of Law in Boston and also studied at Notre Dame Law School in London, England.

Naughton began his legal career as an Assistant District Attorney in Worcester County where he served from 1992 to 1995. Since 1995, he has practiced law at Naughton Law Firm in Clinton. His firm concentrates on litigation, criminal defense, local, national and international development issues, and government relations.

In the early 2000s, Naughton accompanied former President Clinton to Northern Ireland in conjunction with the founding of the Enniskillen Peace Center. Naughton was also an observer at the Saville Investigation Hearings into the "Bloody Sunday" shootings of unarmed civilian civil rights protesters by British troops.

Naughton joined the plaintiff litigation firm Napoli Shkolnik PLLC full time in August 2020. He focuses on PFAS and Environmental Litigation and Veterans Advocacy.

== Massachusetts House of Representatives ==
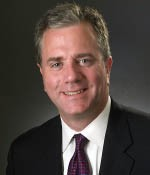
Harold Naughton Jr.

Naughton was first elected to the Massachusetts House of Representatives in 1995 and has since served in the legislature for 24 years.

From 2008-2012, he served as the House Chairman of the Committee on Veterans and Federal Affairs. Naughton was also Chairman of the Judiciary Sub-Committee on Drug Courts and the Supreme Judicial Court Standing Committee on Substance Abuse in the Courts.

Since 2010, Naughton has served as House Chairman of the Joint Committee on Public Safety and Homeland Security. As Chairman, he is currently focusing the Committee's legislative priorities on removing illegal guns from the streets of the Commonwealth.

His legislative priorities include local affairs, education, the environment, veteran's affairs, and constituent outreach. He is an advisory member of the Governor's Commission on Veterans and Military Family Support and a former member of the Democratic National Committee Coordinating Council on Veterans and Military Families.

In April 2020, he announced that he will not seek a fourteenth term that year.

== Military service ==
Following the events of September 11, 2001, Naughton joined the United States Army Reserve. He currently serves as a lieutenant colonel with the Judge Advocate General's Corps. Naughton volunteered for a tour of active duty and served with Multi-National Force Iraq from September, 2005 until May, 2006. At the end of May, 2012, he returned from an 8-month voluntary deployment to Kandahar, Afghanistan with the 2nd Brigade Combat Team, 4th Infantry Division.

As an Army JAG, Naughton worked with local Afghan judicial authorities, military, and security forces, in conjunction with officials from the United Nations, State Department, Red Cross, and other entities, to establish a sustainable judicial and law enforcement system in the City of Kandahar and the greater Kandahar Province in southern Afghanistan.

Naughton currently serves with the Third Legal Operational Detachment and acts as an adjunct to the Defense Security Cooperation Agency and the Defense Institute of International Legal Studies. He has traveled to the Democratic Republic of the Congo, where he has advised the Congolese Army on ethics and anti-corruption.

He has been awarded the Combat Action Badge, Bronze Star Medal, Meritorious Service Medal, Afghan Campaign Medal with Campaign Star, Iraq Campaign Medal with Campaign Star, Army Commendation Medal (2nd Award), Army Achievement Medal, Army Reserve Components Achievement Medal (2nd Award), National Defense Service Medal, Global War on Terrorism Expeditionary Medal, NATO Medal, Army Service Ribbon, Overseas Service Ribbon, Armed Forces Reserve Medal with M/Device, and Military Outstanding Volunteer Service Medal.

In May, 2011, former United States Secretary of State Hillary Clinton appointed Naughton to the International Security Advisory Board. United States Secretary of State John Kerry has since reappointed him to the board.

== Other ==
Naughton has been a commentator on the National ‘Fox and Friends’ Morning television show in regards to the Afghanistan War. He has also made appearances on WGBH, Fox 25, WBZ-TV Channel 4, WBZ Radio 1030, WTKK Radio 96.9, WBUR 90.9 National Public Radio, and NBC’s Today Show.

== See also ==
- 2019–2020 Massachusetts legislature
