= Jay R. Kaufman =

American politician

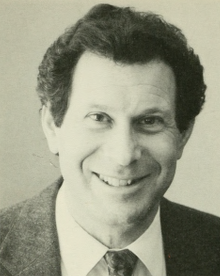
- Portrait of Jay R. Kaufman

Member of the Massachusetts House of Representatives from the 15th Middlesex district
- In office January 4, 1995 – January 2, 2019
- Preceded by: Stephen W. Doran
- Succeeded by: Michelle Ciccolo

Personal details
- Born: May 4, 1947 (age 79) New York, New York
- Party: Democratic
- Education: Brandeis University; New York University
- Occupation: Strategic planning consultant State legislator

Jay R. Kaufman, is the founding President of Beacon Leadership Collaborative. Between 1994 and 2019 he served as the State Representative in the Massachusetts House of Representatives, retiring after 24 years in January 2019. Massachusetts' 15th Middlesex District (Lexington, and Wards 1 and 7 of Woburn, all in Middlesex County).

== Education ==
Kaufman attended Brandeis University where he received a BA. and a MA., and New York University, where he received an MA.

== Profession ==
Founder and President, Beacon Leadership Collaborative

== Organizations ==
Environmental Business Council; Smaller Business Association of New England; Mass. Water Supply Citizens Advisory Committee.

== Public office ==
State Representative, Massachusetts House of Representatives (1995-2019); Lexington Town Meeting Member (1989–2019); Massachusetts Bays Program (Founder and CAC Chair); Mass. Board of Underwater Archaeological Resources; Mass. House (1995–2019).
