= Geoff Hall (politician) =

American teacher (born 1948)

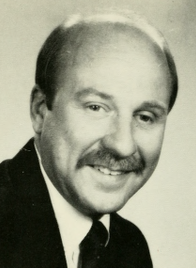
- Portrait of Geoff Hall

Member of the Massachusetts House of Representatives from the 2nd Middlesex District
- In office 1991–2009
- Preceded by: John MacGovern
- Succeeded by: James Arciero

Personal details
- Born: October 10, 1948 (age 77) Ayer, Massachusetts
- Party: Democratic
- Education: Salem State College; University of Massachusetts Lowell
- Occupation: Teacher; Politician

Geoffrey D. Hall (born October 10, 1948) is an American teacher and politician who represented the 2nd Middlesex District in the Massachusetts House of Representatives from 1991 to 2009. He previously served as a member of the Westford, Massachusetts Housing Authority from 1989 to 1992 and the Westford Board of Selectmen from 1983 to 1989.

== Education ==
Hall graduated from Salem State College and the University of Massachusetts Lowell.
