= Francis L. Marini =

American politician

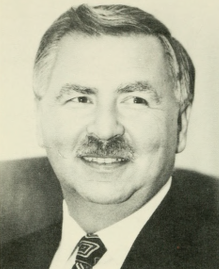
- Portrait of Francis L. Marini

Member of the Massachusetts House of Representatives from the 6th Plymouth District
- In office 1995–2002
- Preceded by: Charles W. Mann
- Succeeded by: Daniel K. Webster

Personal details
- Born: March 5, 1949 (age 77) Quincy, Massachusetts
- Party: Republican
- Education: Suffolk University; Suffolk University Law School; Cornell University
- Profession: Attorney

Francis L. Marini is a Massachusetts politician and jurist who served as a judge in the Taunton District Court. He retired from Hingham District Court in 2015

An attorney and town politician in Hanson, Massachusetts, Marini was elected to the Massachusetts House of Representatives in 1994. He served as Minority Whip from 1997 to 1999 and was the House Minority leader from 1999 to 2002.

Marini resigned from the House on November 19, 2002, in order to become a judge in the Taunton District Court.

Political offices
Preceded by David Peters	Minority Leader of the Massachusetts House of Representatives; 1999 – 2002	Succeeded by Bradley Jones, Jr.
Preceded by David Peters	Minority Whip of the Massachusetts House of Representatives; 1997 – 1999	Succeeded by George N. Peterson, Jr.
