= Henri S. Rauschenbach =

American politician

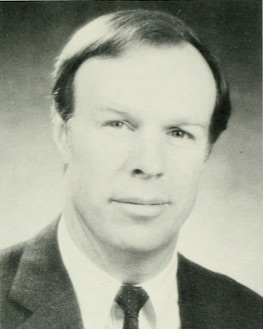
- Henri Rauschenbach, 1991

Member of the Massachusetts Senate from the Cape and Islands district
- In office 1988–2001
- Preceded by: Paul V. Doane
- Succeeded by: Robert O'Leary

Member of the Massachusetts House of Representatives from the 1st Barnstable District
- In office 1985–1988
- Preceded by: Haden Greenhalgh
- Succeeded by: Edward B. Teague III

Personal details
- Born: October 9, 1947 (age 78) Paterson, New Jersey
- Party: Republican
- Education: Dickinson College; Springfield College
- Occupation: Camp Director; Educator; Politician

Henri S. Rauschenbach has served as a Massachusetts legislator and a high-ranking official in state government. He is on the Board of the Northeast Midwest Institute and the Massachusetts Medicaid Policy Institute.

While an undergraduate at Dickinson College in Carlisle, Pennsylvania, Rauschenbach was active in athletics playing soccer, Wrestling and Lacrosse. He was awarded the Dickinson College McAndrews Award in 1969, the most prestigious award presented to a Dickinson College athlete. In addition to being an outstanding student-athlete, the recipient must possess strong leadership qualities, demonstrate good sportsmanship, and serve as positive role models for future athletes. In addition, Rauschenbach was a member of Kappa Sigma fraternity and Raven's Claw Society. He earned a Master of Education from Springfield College.

Rauschenbach served in the Massachusetts House and Senate, and was a member of several committees such as: Ways and Means, Banking, Health Care, Human Services, Insurance and Governmental Regulations. As a member of the Senate Ways and Means Committee, Rauschenbach served as ranking Republican and conferenced eight budgets.

Rauschenbach was indicted on ethics violations charges in 1993. According to investigators, Rauschenbach engaged in an influence peddling scheme in 1991 by pushing a bank-stock fund for the state of Massachusetts. Rauschenbach was alleged to have accepted $17,500 over seven months in 1991 from Carmen W. Elio of Fanueil Hall Capital Group, who had business ties with the fund's director. A Suffolk County grand jury indicted both Rauschenbach and Elio for violating the conflict of interest law and conspiracy. Rauschenbach was acquitted of all charges on October 3, 1995.

Rauschenbach's state government positions included: Undersecretary of Administration and Finance (focusing on Healthcare Policy of the Commonwealth), Senior Policy Advisor on Energy to the Governor (Gov. Cellucci and Gov. Swift), and Senior Deputy Chief of Staff to the Governor (Gov. Swift).
