= Barbara Hyland =

American politician (born 1943)

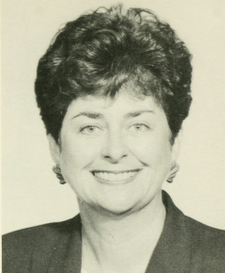

Member of the Massachusetts House of Representatives from the 1st Bristol District
- In office 1992–2001
- Preceded by: William B. Vernon
- Succeeded by: Michael J. Coppola

Personal details
- Born: October 17, 1943 (age 82) Orange, New Jersey
- Party: Republican
- Education: Regis College
- Occupation: Politician

Barbara C. Hyland (born October 17, 1943 in Orange, New Jersey) is an American politician who represented the 1st Bristol District in the Massachusetts House of Representatives from 1992 to 2001. She was previously a member of the Foxborough, Massachusetts School Committee from 1977 to 1986.
