= Daniel F. Keenan =

American politician (born 1961)

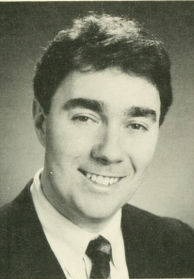
- Portrait of Daniel F. Keenan

Member of the Massachusetts House of Representatives from the 3rd Hampden district
- In office 1995–2007
- Preceded by: Michael P. Walsh
- Succeeded by: Rosemary Sandlin

Personal details
- Born: February 15, 1961 (age 65) Holyoke, Massachusetts
- Party: Democratic
- Spouse: Jill Keenan
- Children: John "Jack" and Matthew Keenan
- Education: Saint Anselm College; Western New England College School of Law
- Occupation: Attorney; Politician

Daniel F. Keenan (born February 15, 1961, in Holyoke, Massachusetts) is an American politician who represented the Third Hampden District in the Massachusetts House of Representatives from 1995 to 2007. He is now the Vice President of Government Relations for Trinity Health Of New England in Springfield, Massachusetts and Hartford, Connecticut. He resides in Southwick, Massachusetts.
