= William G. Greene Jr. =

American politician from Massachusetts

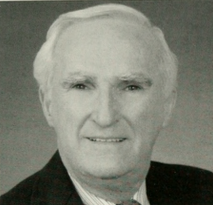
- Official portrait, 2005

Member of the Massachusetts House of Representatives
- In office 1993–2011
- Preceded by: Brion Cangiamila
- Succeeded by: Marc Lombardo
- Constituency: 24th Middlesex district (1993–2003); 22nd Middlesex district (2003–2011)

Personal details
- Born: April 24, 1940 (age 86) Stoneham, Massachusetts, U.S.
- Party: Democratic
- Spouse: Julie Greene
- Children: 2
- Education: Northeastern University

William G. Greene Jr. (born April 24, 1940) is an American politician, was as a member of the Massachusetts House of Representatives from 1993 to 2011, a Billerica, Massachusetts town meeting member from 1970 to 1992, and Billerica Town Moderator from 1985 to 1992.
