= John F. Quinn =

American politician (born 1963)

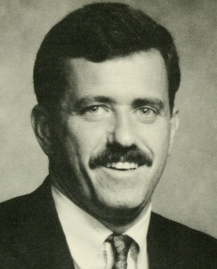

Member of the Massachusetts House of Representatives from the 9th Bristol district
- In office 1992–2011
- Preceded by: Leonard Gonsalves
- Succeeded by: Christopher Markey

Personal details
- Born: April 7, 1963 (age 63) New Bedford, Massachusetts, U.S.
- Party: Democratic
- Education: University of Massachusetts Dartmouth; Suffolk University Law School
- Occupation: Attorney

John F. Quinn (born April 7, 1963) is an American politician who represented 9th Bristol District in the Massachusetts House of Representatives from 1992 to 2011. He was an unsuccessful candidate for Bristol County Sheriff in 2010. He is currently the Assistant Dean for Public Interest Law and External Relations at UMASS Law.
