= J. Michael Ruane =

American politician

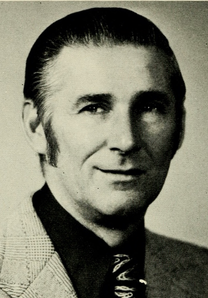
- Portrait of J. Michael Ruane

Member of the Massachusetts House of Representatives from the 7th Essex District
- In office 1975–2005
- Preceded by: Robert Cahill
- Succeeded by: John D. Keenan

Personal details
- Born: December 10, 1927 Salem, Massachusetts, U.S.
- Died: June 25, 2006 (aged 78) Danvers, Massachusetts, U.S.
- Party: Democratic
- Spouse: Helena Piecewicz Ruane
- Education: St. Mary's Boys High School
- Occupation: Politician

J. Michael Ruane (December 10, 1927, in Salem, Massachusetts – June 25, 2006, in Danvers, Massachusetts) was an American politician who represented the 7th Essex district in the Massachusetts House of Representatives from 1975 to 2005.

== Early career ==
The son of a grocery store manager, Ruane attended St. Mary's Boys High School in Lynn, Massachusetts. After graduation he spent three years as a member of the United States Navy. After his military service, Ruane returned to Salem, where he worked for the city as a clerk in the motor division and as a coach, basketball referee and baseball umpire for the Recreation Department. He served as a councilor-at-large on the Salem City Council from 1970 to 1975.

== House of Representatives ==
Ruane was elected to the Massachusetts House of Representatives in 1974. As a result of redistricting, he faced, and defeated, 8th Essex District Representative Bruce McLaughlin in the Democratic primary. After defeating Salem City Councilman Steve Lovely in the 1980 Democratic Primary, Ruane would not face another challenger for 22 years.

From 1996 until his retirement in 2005, he was the vice chairman House Ways and Means Committee.

== Death ==
Ruane died on June 25, 2006, at the Kaplan Family Hospice House in Danvers, Massachusetts. He was survived by his wife Helena and two of their children. A daughter, Christine, and a son, Patrick, predeceased him.
