= William P. Nagle Jr. =

American politician

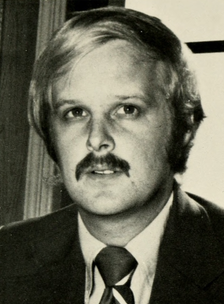

Member of the Massachusetts House of Representatives from the 1st Hampshire district
- In office 1975–2002
- Preceded by: Edward McColgan
- Succeeded by: Peter Kocot

Personal details
- Born: June 10, 1951 (age 75) Northampton, Massachusetts
- Party: Democratic
- Education: Saint Anselm College

William P. Nagle Jr. is an American politician. Nagle was born in Northampton, Massachusetts and graduated from Northampton High School. He graduated from Saint Anselm College in 1973. Nagle served on the Northampton City Council in 1973 and is a Democrat. He then served in the Massachusetts House of Representatives from 1975 to 2002.
