= 1991–1992 Massachusetts legislature =

177th Massachusetts General Court
←	176th	178th	→

Overview
- Legislative body: General Court
- Term: January 2, 1991 – January 5, 1993
- Election: November 6, 1990

Senate
- Members: 40
- President: William Bulger
- Majority Leader: Walter J. Boverini
- Majority Whip: Louis Peter Bertonazzi
- Minority Leader: David H. Locke
- Minority Whip: Mary L. Padula
- Party control: Democrat

House
- Members: 160
- Speaker: Charles Flaherty
- Majority Leader: Richard Voke
- Majority Whip: Kevin W. Fitzgerald
- Minority Leader: Peter Forman
- Minority Whip: Walter DeFilippi
- Party control: Democrat

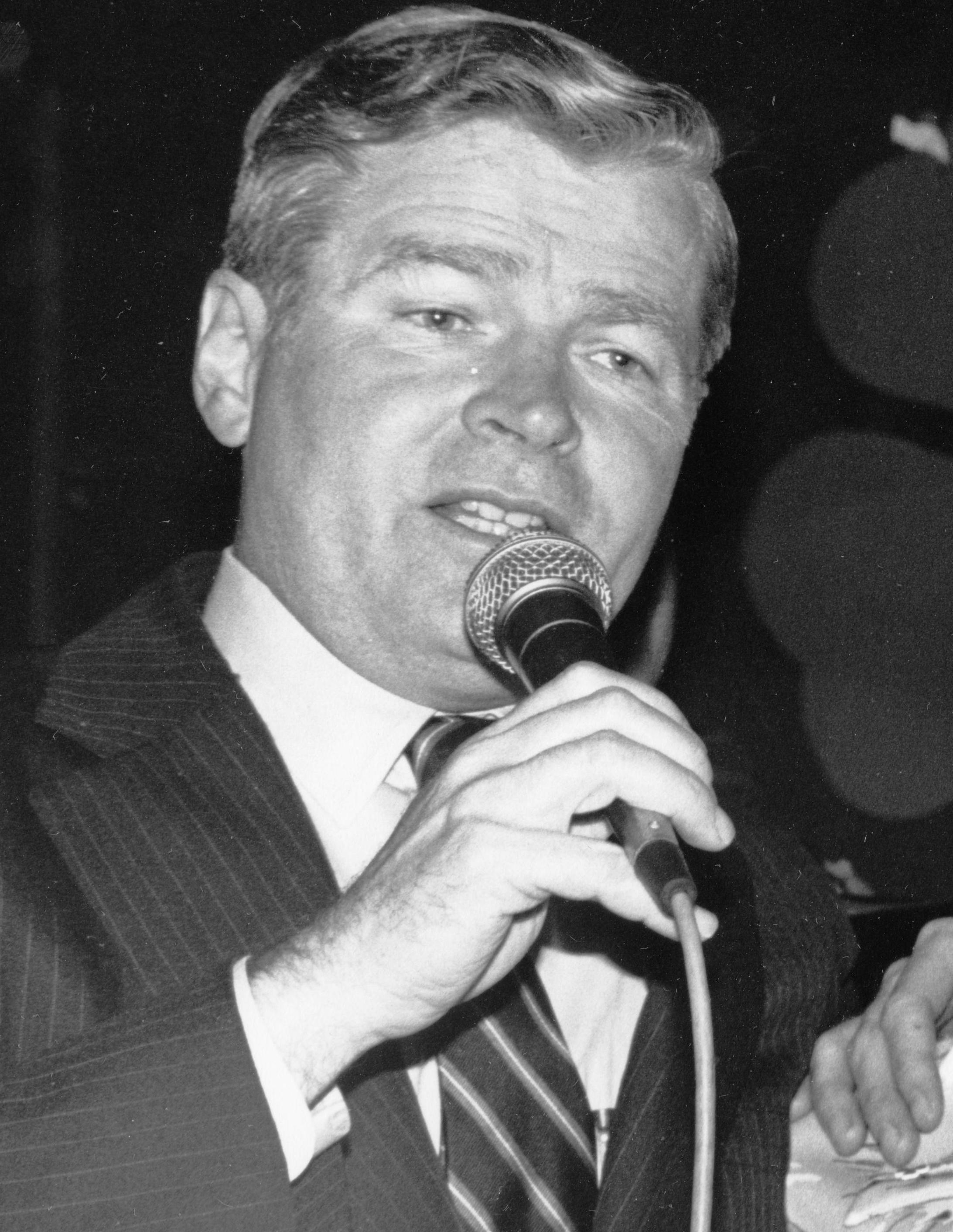
William Bulger, Senate president.

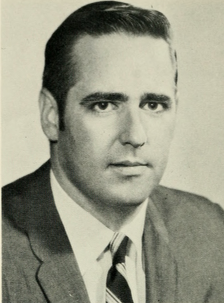
Charles Flaherty, House speaker.

Leaders of the Massachusetts General Court, 1991.

The 177th Massachusetts General Court, consisting of the Massachusetts Senate and the Massachusetts House of Representatives, met in 1991 and 1992 during the governorship of Bill Weld. William Bulger served as president of the Senate and Charles Flaherty served as speaker of the House.

Significant legislation included an act allowing school choice.

== Senators ==
portrait	name	date of birth	district
	Matthew J. Amorello	March 15, 1958	1st Worcester and Middlesex
	Michael J. Barrett	June 27, 1948	Middlesex and Suffolk
	Frederick Berry	December 20, 1949	2nd Essex
	Louis Peter Bertonazzi	October 9, 1933	Worcester and Norfolk
	Tom Birmingham	August 4, 1949	Suffolk, Essex and Middlesex
	Walter J. Boverini	June 5, 1925	1st Essex
	Robert C. Buell	April 23, 1931	1st Essex and Middlesex
	William Bulger	February 2, 1934	1st Suffolk
	Edward L. Burke	1942	Middlesex, Norfolk and Worcester
	Arthur E. Chase	February 4, 1930	Worcester
	Michael C. Creedon	November 3, 1946	Plymouth
	Martin J. Dunn	March 9, 1956	Hampden and Hampshire
	Robert Durand	February 28, 1953	Middlesex and Worcester
	Paul D. Harold	September 5, 1948	Norfolk
	Robert Havern III	July 17, 1949	4th Middlesex
	Robert L. Hedlund	July 12, 1961	Norfolk and Plymouth
	Lucile Hicks	May 11, 1938	5th Middlesex
	James Jajuga	December 12, 1946	3rd Essex
	Bill Keating (politician)	September 6, 1952	Norfolk and Bristol
	Edward P. Kirby	January 10, 1928	Plymouth and Barnstable
	Christopher M. Lane	May 15, 1959	1st Suffolk and Norfolk
	Brian Lees	July 25, 1953	2nd Hampden
	David H. Locke	August 4, 1927	Norfolk, Bristol and Middlesex
	Michael LoPresti Jr.	April 30, 1947	Suffolk and Middlesex
	William Q. MacLean Jr.	November 4, 1934	2nd Bristol
	Patricia McGovern	August 2, 1941	2nd Essex and Middlesex
	Linda Melconian		1st Hampden
	Thomas C. Norton	December 11, 1934	1st Bristol
	John Olver	September 3, 1936	Franklin and Hampshire
	Bill Owens (Massachusetts politician)	July 6, 1937	2nd Suffolk
	Mary L. Padula		2nd Worcester and Middlesex
	Lois Pines	August 16, 1940	Middlesex and Norfolk
	Henri S. Rauschenbach	October 9, 1947	Cape and Islands
	Stan Rosenberg	October 12, 1949	Franklin and Hampshire
	Charles E. Shannon Jr.	August 31, 1943	2nd Middlesex
	Nancy Achin Sullivan	January 20, 1959	1st Middlesex
	Jane Swift	February 24, 1965	Berkshire
	Richard Tisei	August 13, 1962	3rd Middlesex
	Erving H. Wall, Jr.		Bristol and Plymouth
	Robert D. Wetmore	July 24, 1930	Worcester, Hampden, Hampshire, and Franklin
	W. Paul White	July 7, 1945	2nd Suffolk and Norfolk

== Representatives ==
portrait	name	date of birth	district
	Steven Angelo	June 8, 1952	9th Essex
	Robert A. Antonioni	July 15, 1958	4th Worcester
	John Binienda	June 22, 1947	17th Worcester
	Kevin Blanchette	1954	16th Essex
	Peter I. Blute	January 28, 1956	11th Worcester
	Daniel E. Bosley	December 9, 1953	1st Berkshire
	John C. Bradford	February 16, 1940	10th Bristol
	Marianne Brenton	February 25, 1933	23rd Middlesex
	James T. Brett	December 22, 1949	14th Suffolk
	Stephen Brewer	February 10, 1948	5th Worcester
	Carmen Buell	February 3, 1945	2nd Franklin
	Suzanne M. Bump	February 18, 1956	5th Norfolk
	John Businger	February 5, 1945	15th Norfolk
	Antonio Cabral	January 26, 1955	13th Bristol
	Thomas Cahir	September 19, 1952	3rd Barnstable
	Brion M. Cangiamila		24th Middlesex
	Paul Caron	November 15, 1955	11th Hampden
	Paul Casey	February 26, 1961	34th Middlesex
	William Cass	1963	22nd Middlesex
	Athan Catjakis	1931	9th Hampden
	Robert A. Cerasoli	July 12, 1947	3rd Norfolk
	Vincent P. Ciampa	April 15, 1945	37th Middlesex
	Edward J. Clancy Jr.	June 30, 1950	11th Essex
	Forrester Clark	November 30, 1934	4th Essex
	Carol Cleven	November 2, 1928	16th Middlesex
	David B. Cohen (mayor)	September 2, 1947	11th Middlesex
	Andrew Collaro	March 21, 1910	15th Worcester
	Edward G. Connolly	August 22, 1928	31st Middlesex
	William Constantino Jr.	May 27, 1944	12th Worcester
	Gary Coon	March 25, 1964	17th Essex
	Robert Correia	January 3, 1939	7th Bristol
	John F. Cox	July 27, 1955	17th Middlesex
	John F. Cruz		10th Plymouth
	Charles Decas	October 5, 1937	2nd Plymouth
	Walter DeFilippi	October 3, 1926	6th Hampden
	Robert DeLeo (politician)	March 27, 1950	20th Suffolk
	Brian Dempsey (politician)	September 30, 1966	3rd Essex
	Salvatore DiMasi	August 11, 1945	3rd Suffolk
	Carol A. Donovan	June 5, 1937	33rd Middlesex
	Stephen W. Doran	March 26, 1956	15th Middlesex
	Marc Draisen	December 22, 1956	11th Suffolk
	John R. Driscoll	May 9, 1924	9th Worcester
	Hasty Evans	August 7, 1948	13th Middlesex
	Thomas Finneran	January 2, 1950	13th Suffolk
	Kevin W. Fitzgerald	1950	16th Suffolk
	Charles Flaherty (politician)	October 13, 1938	27th Middlesex
	Peter Forman	April 28, 1958	1st Plymouth
	Gloria Fox	March 18, 1942	7th Suffolk
	William C. Galvin	October 18, 1956	6th Norfolk
	Paul J. Gannon	May 21, 1960	4th Suffolk
	Barbara Gardner	January 19, 1941	8th Middlesex
	David Gately	September 27, 1955	9th Middlesex
	John George Jr.	July 31, 1946	9th Bristol
	Mary Jane Gibson	February 7, 1933	26th Middlesex
	Anthony Giglio	January 28, 1941	38th Middlesex
	Larry F. Giordano	1944	15th Essex
	William Glodis	April 6, 1934	16th Worcester
	Emile Goguen	March 16, 1933	3rd Worcester
	Leonard Gonsalves		9th Bristol
	Barbara Gray	October 11, 1926	6th Middlesex
	Paul Haley	June 9, 1953	4th Norfolk
	Geoff Hall (politician)	October 10, 1948	2nd Middlesex
	Lida E. Harkins	January 24, 1944	13th Norfolk
	Robert Hawke	July 20, 1932	2nd Worcester
	Jeffery Hayward	April 3, 1960	10th Essex
	Jonathan Healy	October 10, 1945	1st Franklin
	James R. Henry	December 19, 1963	6th Essex
	Joseph N. Hermann	June 8, 1924	14th Essex
	Albert Herren	June 8, 1952	6th Bristol
	Shirley Owens Hicks	April 22, 1942	6th Suffolk
	Barbara Hildt	April 13, 1946	1st Essex
	Christopher Hodgkins	August 24, 1957	4th Berkshire
	Iris Holland	September 30, 1920	2nd Hampden
	Kevin Honan	June 5, 1958	18th Suffolk
	Augusta Hornblower	June 6, 1948	1st Middlesex
	Robert L. Howarth	1942	13th Hampden
	Frank Hynes	December 23, 1940	4th Plymouth
	Patricia D. Jehlen	October 14, 1943	30th Middlesex
	Raymond A. Jordan Jr.	May 5, 1943	12th Hampden
	Louis Kafka	November 28, 1945	8th Norfolk
	Stephen Karol	1948	2nd Bristol
	Marie-Louise Kehoe	December 12, 1928	11th Norfolk
	Shaun P. Kelly	March 13, 1964	2nd Berkshire
	Thomas P. Kennedy	August 15, 1951	9th Plymouth
	Sally Kerans	May 26, 1960	13th Essex
	John C. Klimm	November 5, 1955	2nd Barnstable
	Michael Knapik	February 11, 1963	4th Hampden
	Robert Koczera	November 25, 1953	11th Bristol
	Paul Kollios	February 24, 1936	7th Worcester
	Robert Kraus	March 20, 1957	12th Plymouth
	Robert Krekorian	1962	21st Middlesex
	Edward M. Lambert Jr.	March 8, 1958	8th Bristol
	Patrick Landers	September 20, 1959	1st Hampden
	Peter J. Larkin	December 23, 1953	3rd Berkshire
	Robert C. Lawless	1957	4th Barnstable
	Edward LeLacheur	June 1, 1925	18th Middlesex
	Kenneth M. Lemanski	January 27, 1954	8th Hampden
	Jacqueline Lewis	May 3, 1945	8th Plymouth
	David J. Lionett	October 3, 1943	14th Worcester
	David P. Magnani	May 24, 1944	7th Middlesex
	Anthony Mandile	August 14, 1946	10th Middlesex
	Charles Mann	April 27, 1935	6th Plymouth
	M. Joseph Manning	September 23, 1924	7th Norfolk
	Francis Mara	1950	11th Plymouth
	Ronald Mariano	October 31, 1946	3rd Norfolk
	Robert H. Marsh	August 15, 1959	14th Norfolk
	Jim Marzilli	May 8, 1958	25th Middlesex
	John E. McDonough	May 21, 1953	12th Suffolk
	Joseph B. McIntyre	April 11, 1957	12th Bristol
	Mary Jane McKenna	October 23, 1939	1st Worcester
	John C. McNeil	June 8, 1945	36th Middlesex
	Joan Menard	September 6, 1935	5th Bristol
	Nelson Merced	August 17, 1947	5th Suffolk
	Jim Miceli	March 25, 1935	20th Middlesex
	Richard T. Moore	August 7, 1943	8th Worcester
	Michael W. Morrissey	August 2, 1954	1st Norfolk
	Mary Jeanette Murray	December 24, 1924	3rd Plymouth
	William P. Nagle Jr.	June 10, 1951	1st Hampshire
	Janet O'Brien		5th Plymouth
	Shannon O%27Brien	April 30, 1959	2nd Hampshire
	Timothy F. O'Leary	1944	35th Middlesex
	Kevin O'Sullivan (politician)	September 30, 1953	13th Worcester
	Marc Pacheco	October 29, 1952	3rd Bristol
	Thomas Palumbo	June 9, 1950	2nd Essex
	Marie Parente	May 22, 1928	10th Worcester
	David Peters (politician)	March 1, 1954	6th Worcester
	Douglas W. Petersen	March 7, 1948	8th Essex
	Thomas Petrolati	March 16, 1957	7th Hampden
	Kevin Poirier	July 7, 1940	14th Bristol
	Daniel Ranieri	1951	10th Norfolk
	William Reinstein	March 26, 1929	17th Suffolk
	Pamela Resor	February 26, 1942	14th Middlesex
	Mary Rogeness	May 18, 1941	2nd Hampden
	Robert J. Rohan	August 15, 1921	5th Hampden
	Mark Roosevelt	December 10, 1955	8th Suffolk
	Stan Rosenberg	October 12, 1949	3rd Hampshire
	Susan Rourke	March 7, 1954	19th Middlesex
	J. Michael Ruane	December 10, 1927	7th Essex
	Byron Rushing	July 29, 1942	9th Suffolk
	Angelo Scaccia	September 29, 1942	15th Suffolk
	Susan Schur	February 27, 1940	12th Middlesex
	Anthony M. Scibelli	October 16, 1911	10th Hampden
	Emanuel Serra	June 12, 1945	1st Suffolk
	Douglas Stoddart	March 5, 1952	5th Middlesex
	Ellen Story	October 17, 1941	3rd Hampshire
	Gregory W. Sullivan	January 29, 1952	12th Norfolk
	Michael Sullivan (U.S. Attorney)	October 3, 1954	7th Plymouth
	Bruce Tarr	January 2, 1964	5th Essex
	Edward B. Teague III	November 25, 1949	1st Barnstable
	Alvin Thompson	May 15, 1939	28th Middlesex
	A. Stephen Tobin	July 3, 1956	2nd Norfolk
	Warren Tolman	October 23, 1959	32nd Middlesex
	Susan Tracy	August 24, 1960	19th Suffolk
	Philip Travis	July 2, 1940	4th Bristol
	Eric Turkington	August 12, 1947	Barnstable, Dukes & Nantucket
	Daniel Valianti	1965	4th Middlesex
	Peter A. Vellucci	1942	29th Middlesex
	William B. Vernon	April 17, 1951	1st Bristol
	Richard Voke	December 2, 1947	2nd Suffolk
	Joseph Wagner (Massachusetts politician)	May 7, 1960	8th Hampden
	Patricia Walrath	August 11, 1941	3rd Middlesex
	Marian Walsh	1954	10th Suffolk
	Michael P. Walsh	July 1, 1956	3rd Hampden
	Thomas Walsh (Massachusetts politician)	July 15, 1960	12th Essex
	Francis H. Woodward	March 17, 1939	9th Norfolk

== See also ==
- 1990 Massachusetts general election
- 102nd United States Congress
- List of Massachusetts General Courts
