= 1994 Massachusetts gubernatorial election =

- November 8, 1994
- Turnout: 70.05% ▼5.8
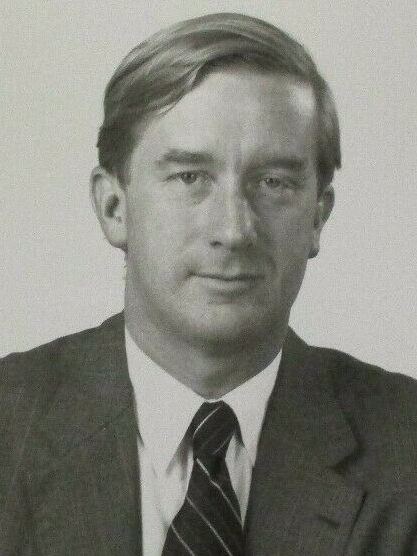

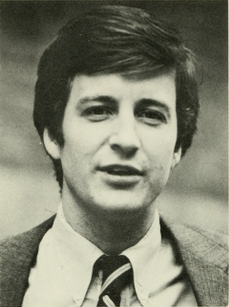
Nominee	Bill Weld	Mark Roosevelt
Party	Republican	Democratic
Running mate	Paul Cellucci	Bob Massie
Popular vote	1,533,390	611,650
Percentage	70.87%	28.27%
- Weld: 50–60% 60–70% 70–80% 80–90% Roosevelt: 50–60%
Governor before election
Bill Weld
Republican
Elected Governor
Bill Weld
Republican

The 1994 Massachusetts gubernatorial election was held on November 8, 1994. Incumbent Republican governor Bill Weld won re-election as governor of Massachusetts by the largest margin in state history, winning every county and all but six of the state's 351 municipalities. As of 2024, this is the most recent election in which Boston, Somerville, Lawrence, Chelsea, Brookline, Northampton, Provincetown, Monterey, Great Barrington, Ashfield, Williamstown, Williamsburg, Shelburne, Sunderland, and Pelham voted for the Republican candidate for governor.

== Republican primary ==
=== Governor ===
==== Candidates ====
- Bill Weld, incumbent governor

=== Lieutenant governor ===
==== Candidates ====
- Paul Cellucci, incumbent lieutenant governor

Incumbent governor Bill Weld and Lieutenant Governor Paul Cellucci were unopposed for renomination.

== Democratic primary ==
=== Governor ===
==== Candidates ====
- George A. Bachrach, former state senator from Watertown
- Michael J. Barrett, state senator from Cambridge
- Mark Roosevelt, state representative from the Back Bay and member of the Roosevelt family

In 1987, Barrett succeeded Bachrach as the senator from the Middlesex and Suffolk District. The district was composed of Cambridge, Belmont, Watertown, and the Allston-Brighton neighborhood of Boston.

===== Declined =====
- Joseph P. Kennedy II, U.S. representative (1987–1999)

In 1993, a Boston Globe poll showed Kennedy within one percentage point of popular incumbent William Weld in a hypothetical gubernatorial match-up, prompting prominent state Democrats to try and recruit him for the race. Though no other Democrat was polling near Weld, Kennedy decided to forgo the race and remain in Congress.

==== Results ====
Primary results by municipality

Massachusetts Democratic gubernatorial primary, 1994
Party	Candidate	Votes	%
Democratic	Mark Roosevelt	215,061	47.91%
Democratic	George Bachrach	120,567	26.86%
Democratic	Michael J. Barrett	111,199	24.77%
Total votes		446,827	100.00%

=== Lieutenant governor ===
==== Candidates ====
- Bob Massie, activist
- Marc Draisen, state representative from Roslindale

==== Results ====
Massachusetts Democratic lt. gubernatorial primary, 1994
Party	Candidate	Votes	%
Democratic	Bob Massie	193,508	52.66%
Democratic	Marc Draisen	173,896	47.34%
Total votes		367,404	100.00%

== General election ==
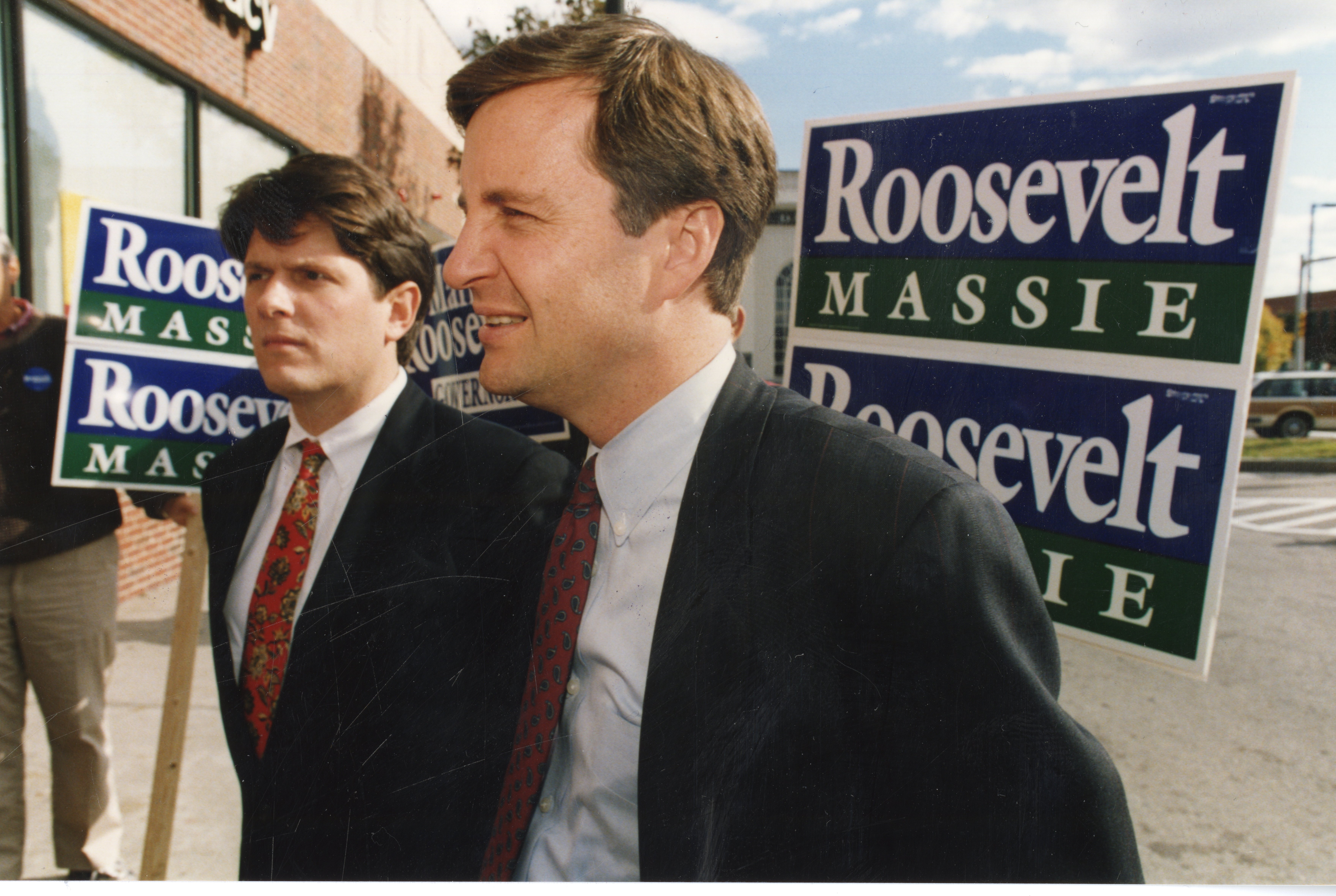
The Democratic ticket of Roosevelt (right) and Massie (left) campaigning in Danvers

=== Debates ===
1994 Massachusetts gubernatorial election debates
No.	Date	Host	Moderator	Link	Republican	Democratic
Key: P Participant A Absent N Not invited I Invited W Withdrawn						
Key: P Participant A Absent N Not invited I Invited W Withdrawn					Bill Weld	Mark Roosevelt
1	Oct. 18. 1994	Boston Herald; WCVB-TV	Natalie Jacobson	C-SPAN	P	P
2	Oct. 26. 1994	The Boston Globe; WBZ-TV	Liz Walker; Jack Williams	C-SPAN	P	P

=== Polling ===
Source	Date	Weld (R)	Roosevelt (D)
Boston Herald	Oct. 2, 1994	60%	29%

=== Results ===
Governor Weld defeated Democrat Mark Roosevelt by a 71%–28% margin, the largest gubernatorial margin of victory in modern Massachusetts history. Roosevelt won only six municipalities statewide (Amherst, Cambridge, Leverett, Otis, Shutesbury and Wendell). All six municipalities voted for Weld in 1990, meaning that he won every municipality in the state in a gubernatorial election.

1994 Massachusetts gubernatorial election
Party	Candidate	Votes	%	±%
Republican	Bill Weld (incumbent)	1,533,390	70.87%	+20.66
Democratic	Mark Roosevelt	611,650	28.27%	−18.68
Libertarian	Dean Cook	14,698	0.68%	N/A
LaRouche Was Right	Jeffrey W. Rebello	3,907	0.18%	N/A
Total votes		2,163,645	100.00%	

=== Results by county ===
1994 United States gubernatorial election in Massachusetts (by county)
County	Weld - R %	Weld - R #	Roosevelt - D %	Roosevelt - D #	Others %	Others #	Total #
Barnstable	74.7%	68,719	24.6%	22,576	0.7%	662	91,957
Berkshire	62.6%	30,430	36.3%	17,618	1.1%	553	48,601
Bristol	66.2%	105,751	32.4%	51,702	1.4%	2,188	159,641
Dukes	64.3%	3,748	34.4%	2,007	1.3%	77	5,832
Essex	74.5%	189,618	24.7%	63,019	0.7%	1,935	254,542
Franklin	68.0%	18,226	30.7%	8,217	1.2%	345	26,788
Hampden	75.1%	109,631	23.9%	34,860	1.1%	1,526	146,017
Hampshire	64.1%	33,965	34.8%	18,449	1.1%	613	53,027
Middlesex	69.7%	376,503	29.5%	159,190	0.8%	4,445	540,138
Nantucket	72.4%	2,131	27.0%	794	0.6%	17	2,942
Norfolk	71.6%	187,155	27.7%	72,479	0.7%	1,877	261,511
Plymouth	75.5%	123,320	23.7%	38,747	0.8%	1,338	163,405
Suffolk	60.4%	99,615	38.6%	63,716	1.1%	1,715	165,046
Worcester	75.4%	184,578	23.8%	58,306	0.7%	1,947	244,831

Counties that flipped from Democratic to Republican

- Berkshire
- Bristol
- Dukes
- Hampden
- Suffolk

== See also ==
- 1993–1994 Massachusetts legislature, for the legislature at the time of this election
- 1995–1996 Massachusetts legislature, for the legislature elected concurrently
- 1994 Massachusetts elections, for other elections held concurrently
