= Stephen W. Doran =

American politician (born 1956)

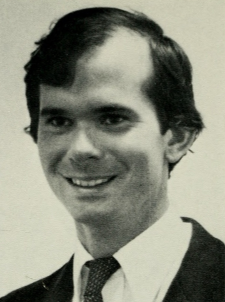

Member of the Massachusetts House of Representatives from the 15th Middlesex district
- In office 1981–1995
- Preceded by: Lincoln P. Cole
- Succeeded by: Jay R. Kaufman

Personal details
- Born: March 26, 1956 (age 70) Boston, Massachusetts, U.S.
- Party: Democratic
- Education: University of Massachusetts Amherst
- Occupation: State legislator Parking lot manager Bank executive Tutor; Drug trafficker

Stephen W. Doran (born March 26, 1956) is an American politician who was a member of the Massachusetts House of Representatives from 1981 to 1995. He later worked as a bank executive and math tutor. In 2014 he pleaded guilty to drug trafficking and served 3 years in prison; he was scheduled to finish his sentence in 2017.

== Early life ==
Doran was born on March 26, 1956, in Boston. He attended Lexington High School, the University of Massachusetts Amherst, and the London School of Economics.

== Political career ==
Doran began his political career as a Lexington Town Meeting Member in 1975. In 1978 he unsuccessfully challenged incumbent state representative Lincoln P. Cole. In 1980 he defeated Cole to become the representative for the 15th Middlesex District. During his freshman term, Doran was an active participant in the House budget debate.

At the beginning of his second term, Doran was a leader of a bipartisan coalition of more than fifty representatives who sought to reform the House rules. Their proposed changes included limiting sessions to the hours between 10 a.m. to 10 p.m., requiring that agendas be published for all formal sessions, that all conference reports be distributed 24 hours before floor action, and allowing television and radio journalists to broadcast formal House sessions. He also was a leading supporter of overhauling the prevailing-wage law, which required the Commonwealth and municipal governments to pay union wages on contractual jobs, such as construction or snow removal.

While serving in the House, Doran had a parking lot concession in Cape Cod and spent most of the summer running it.

=== Ethics Committee ===
In 1989, Speaker George Keverian chose Doran to chair the House Ethics Committee. In 1990, the committee took no action against Keverian after he admitted to hiring subordinates to do remodeling work on his house and accepting free rugs from a legislative vendor. The committee concluded that the conflict of interest law Keverian admitted to violating does not exist in the House ethics code and therefore took no disciplinary action against him. In 1991, the committee voted 6 to 5 to remove Kevin Fitzgerald from his position as majority whip for having accepted a $200,000 inheritance from a troubled homeless woman. Doran sided with two other Democrats and three Republicans in favor of sanctioning Fitzgerald. In 1994, the committee was on the verge of recommending the expulsion of representative John McNeil due to charges that he solicited sex from one of his former interns. However, Massachusetts Attorney General Scott Harshbarger and US Attorney John Pappalardo requested that the committee suspend its work due to fears that taking testimony from witnesses during a quasi-judicial hearing could jeopardize their cases (which included extortion, bribery, money laundering, and mail fraud) against McNeil.

== Post-political career ==
In 1994, Doran chose not to run for reelection and instead entered the banking industry as a vice president at Fleet Mortgage, a subsidiary of Fleet Financial Group. At Fleet, Doran oversaw the company's New England mortgage operations.

In August 2012, Doran began working as a math tutor at MATCH Public Charter Middle School in Jamaica Plain. He was later diagnosed with stage three melanoma and began chemotherapy.

=== Methamphetamine trafficking ===
On May 21, 2013, Doran received a package at the school. State Police, acting on a tip, detained Doran on the street and obtained the package from the school front desk. The package contained two heat-sealed baggies containing 480 grams of crystal meth. Authorities then obtained a warrant to search Doran's home. There they found an additional 38 grams of meth, about $10,000 in cash, and a digital scale and other items consistent with drug distribution. He was arrested on charges of trafficking methamphetamine and violating the state's law against drugs in a school zone. The drugs had a street value of about $50,000.

On March 31, 2014, Doran pleaded guilty to trafficking in methamphetamine and money laundering. He was sentenced to three years in prison followed by two years of probation. According to one of his defense attorneys, Doran was a "terrible addict" who had sought treatment and been substance-free since his arrest.

Due to the similarities, Doran's case has been compared to the television show Breaking Bad and Doran has been compared to its protagonist, Walter White.

On June 21, 2024, Doran was arrested and charged with possession of a Class B drug after police found methamphetamine during a traffic stop in Bourne, Massachusetts.

== See also ==
- 1981–1982 Massachusetts legislature
- 1983–1984 Massachusetts legislature
- 1985–1986 Massachusetts legislature
- 1987–1988 Massachusetts legislature
- 1989–1990 Massachusetts legislature
- 1991–1992 Massachusetts legislature
- 1993–1994 Massachusetts legislature
