= Michael F. Flaherty Sr. =

American politician (1936–2025)

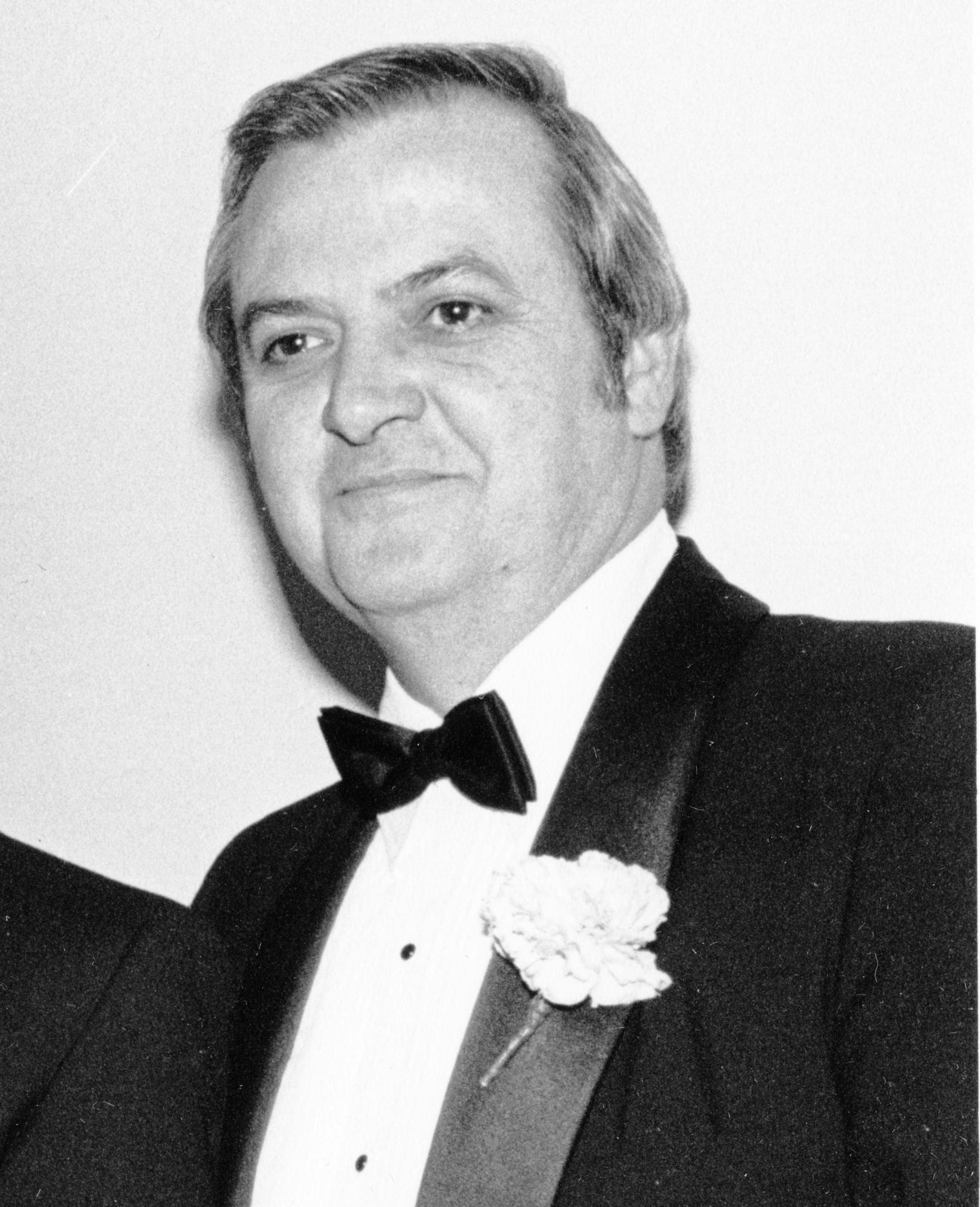
- Flaherty in 1984

Associate justice of the Boston Municipal Court
- In office July 2001 – 2006

Member of the Massachusetts House of Representatives
- In office January 3, 1967 – January 3, 1991
- Succeeded by: Paul J. Gannon

Personal details
- Born: September 6, 1936 Boston, Massachusetts, U.S.
- Died: December 22, 2025 (aged 89)
- Party: Democratic
- Relations: Michael F. Flaherty (son)
- Occupation: Attorney at law

Michael F. Flaherty Sr. (September 6, 1936 – December 22, 2025) was an American politician who was a member of the Massachusetts House of Representatives and an associate justice of the Boston Municipal Court. A South Boston Democrat, he represented the 4th Suffolk district from 1967 to 1991. He was appointed to the Boston Municipal Court by Governor Jane M. Swift in July 2001, and retired in 2006. He was an attorney who graduated from Boston College and the New England School of Law. He was the father of Michael F. Flaherty, a former Boston City Council president.

Flaherty died on December 22, 2025, at the age of 89.

== Sources ==
- Public officers of the Commonwealth of Massachusetts (1989–1990). Massachusetts General Court. p. 131.
- "Mass. lawmakers bracing for battle over court budget." The Boston Globe. May 15, 2002.
