= Liz Malia =

American politician (born 1949)

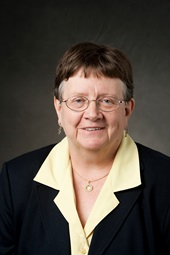

Member of the Massachusetts House of Representatives from the 11th Suffolk district
- In office March 1998 – January 4, 2023
- Preceded by: John E. McDonough
- Succeeded by: Judith García

Personal details
- Born: September 30, 1949 (age 77) Endicott, New York
- Party: Democratic
- Education: Boston College (A.B.); University of Massachusetts Boston
- Occupation: Legislator
- Website: Representative Liz Malia

Elizabeth A. "Liz" Malia (born September 30, 1949) is an American politician from the Commonwealth of Massachusetts. A progressive Democrat, she served in the Massachusetts House of Representatives from March 1998 to January 2023. She represented the 35,000 constituents Eleventh Suffolk district, which includes parts of the Boston neighborhoods of Jamaica Plain, Roslindale, Roxbury and Dorchester.

== Early life and education ==
Malia is originally from Endicott, New York, and first moved to Boston to attend college, moving to Jamaica Plain in 1970. She graduated from Boston College in 1971 with a BA in Education and English, returning in 1989 to complete the graduate certificate program at the Center for Women in Politics and Government.

=== Political Career and Accomplishments ===
Malia has said that her interest in political activism, including gay rights, developed while living in Jamaica Plain in the 1980s, then a hot spot for activists and progressive movements in Boston. She worked in human services, healthcare, community organizing and labor advocacy before becoming chief of staff to state representative John E. McDonough in 1990.

In late 1997, McDonough retired mid-term to take up an associate professorship at Brandeis University and Malia jumped into the race to succeed him. She won the special preliminary election easily and went on to win 67% of the special general election vote. Malia was re-elected in November 1998 and won every biennial re-election until October 2021 when she announced her decision not to run for re-election.

In the legislature, she served as Assistant Vice-chair of the House Committee on Ways and Means. Malia has also served on the Joint Committee on Labor and Workforce Development and the Education Joint Committee, and as House Chair of the Joint Committee on Mental Health, Substance Use and Recovery.

During her time in office, Malia championed many legislative acts including the Criminal Offender Record Information Reform (CORI) (Ch. 256 of 2010), 14 Days of Detox and Step-Down Services (Ch. 258 of Acts of 2014), Prescription Drug Abuse act (Ch. 244 Acts of 2012), Substance Use Civil Commitments Shifted Out of Prison act (Ch. 8 of Acts of 2016), Substance Use, Treatment, Education and Prevention (Opioid bill) (Ch. 52 of Acts 2016), and Motor Vehicle License Suspension act (Ch. 64 of Acts of 2016).

=== Work in Gay Rights ===
Malia, a lesbian, co-founded the Bay State Gay and Lesbian Democrats in the mid-1980s. The group advocated for adding language the Massachusetts Democratic Party Charter that recognized gay and lesbian issues as human rights issues. She was one of five openly LGBT members of the Massachusetts General Court, alongside Sarah Peake (D–Provincetown), Kate Hogan (D–Stow), and Denise Andrews (D–Orange), as well as Senator Stan Rosenberg (D–Amherst).

In April 2019, Malia and six other openly LGBTQ legislators were honored for their work by MassEquality and was awarded their Political Icon award for her work advancing LGBTQ rights in Massachusetts.

== See also ==
- 2019–2020 Massachusetts legislature
- 2021–2022 Massachusetts legislature
