= Massachusetts House of Representatives' Barnstable, Dukes and Nantucket district =

American legislative district

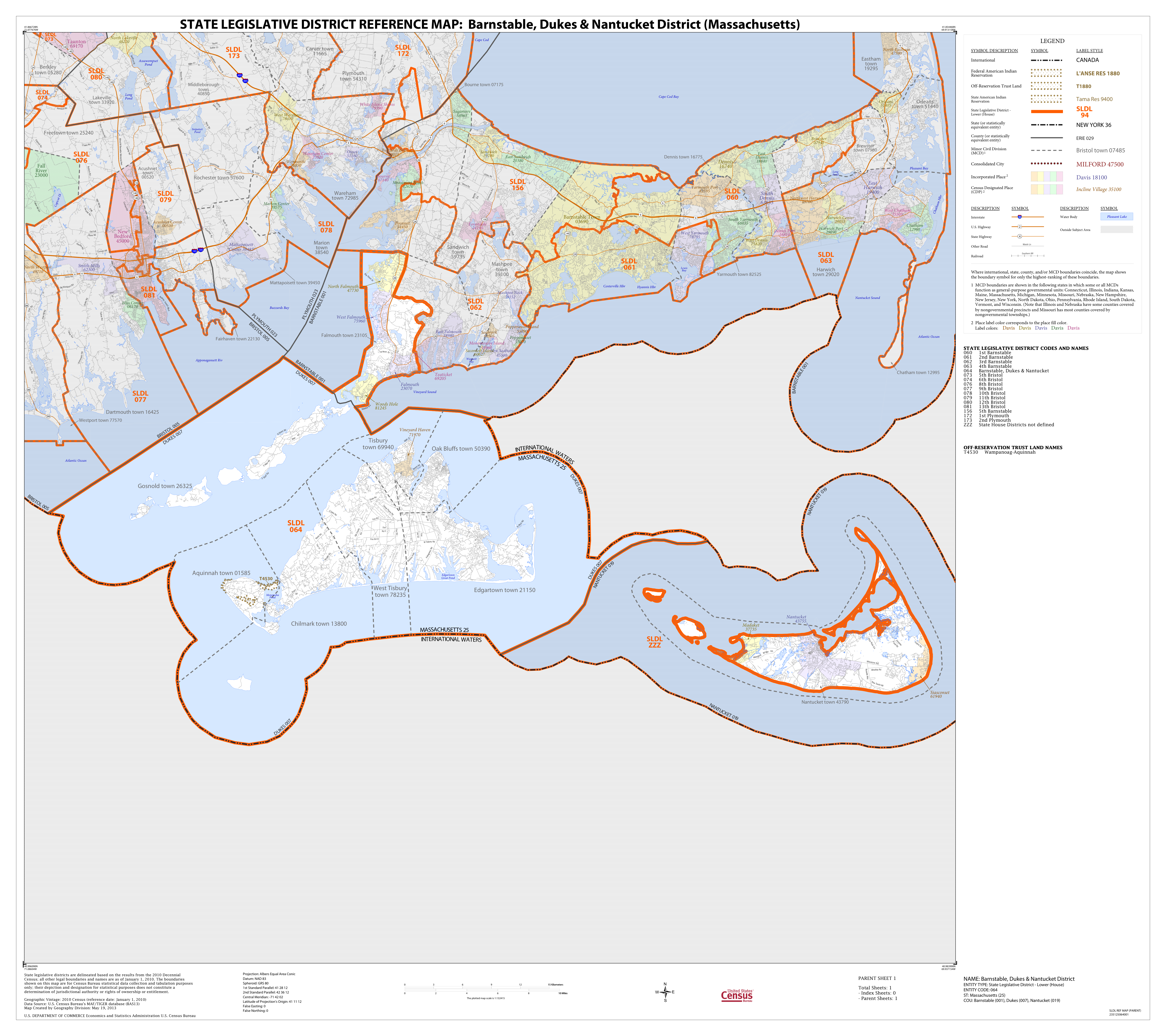
Map of Massachusetts House of Representatives' Barnstable, Dukes & Nantucket district, based on the 2010 United States census.

Massachusetts House of Representatives' Barnstable, Dukes and Nantucket district in the United States is one of 160 legislative districts included in the lower house of the Massachusetts General Court. It covers Dukes County, Nantucket County, and part of Barnstable County. Since 2025, Thomas Moakley of the Democratic Party has represented the district.

== Towns represented ==
The district includes the following localities:

- Aquinnah
- Chilmark
- Edgartown
- part of Falmouth
- Gosnold
- Nantucket
- Oak Bluffs
- Tisbury
- West Tisbury

The current district geographic boundary overlaps with those of the Massachusetts Senate's Cape and Islands and Plymouth and Barnstable districts.

== Representatives ==
Member	Party	Years	Legis.	Electoral history	District towns
Eric Turkington (Falmouth)	Democratic	January 4, 1989– January 7, 2009	177th 178th 179th 180th 181st 182nd 183rd 184th 185th 186th	Elected in 1988. Re-elected in 1990. Re-elected in 1992. Re-elected in 1994. Re-elected in 1996. Re-elected in 1998. Re-elected in 2000. Re-elected in 2002. Re-elected in 2004. Re-elected in 2006. Ran for Barnstable County Register of Probate.	
Timothy Madden (Nantucket)	Democratic	January 7, 2009– January 4, 2017	187th 188th 189th 190th	Elected in 2008. Re-elected in 2010. Re-elected in 2012. Re-elected in 2014. Retired.	
Dylan Fernandes (Falmouth)	Democratic	January 4, 2017– January 1, 2025	191st 191st 192nd 193rd	Elected in 2016. Re-elected in 2018. Re-elected in 2020. Re-elected in 2022. Elected to State Senate.	
Thomas Moakley	Democratic	January 1, 2025–	194th	Elected in 2024.	

== See also ==
- List of Massachusetts House of Representatives elections
- Other Barnstable County districts of the Massachusetts House of Representatives: 1st, 2nd, 3rd, 4th, 5th
- List of Massachusetts General Courts
- List of former districts of the Massachusetts House of Representatives
