= Eugene O'Flaherty =

American politician

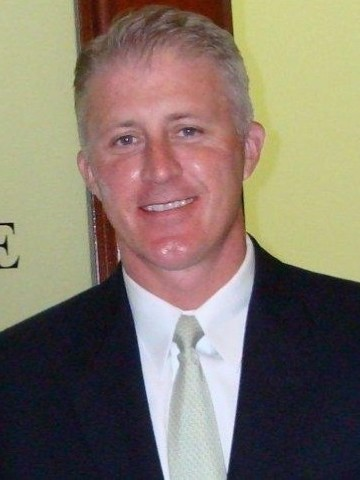

Corporation Counsel of Boston, Massachusetts
- In office January 2014 – February 2021
- Appointed by: Marty Walsh
- Preceded by: William Sinnott
- Succeeded by: Henry C. Luthin

Member of the Massachusetts House of Representatives from the 2nd Suffolk district
- In office January 1, 1997 – January 31, 2014
- Preceded by: Richard A. Voke
- Succeeded by: Daniel Joseph Ryan

Personal details
- Born: July 20, 1968 (age 58) Stoneham, Massachusetts
- Party: Democratic
- Education: Suffolk University (BS); Massachusetts School of Law (JD)

Eugene L. O'Flaherty (born July 20, 1968) is an American lawyer and politician who served in the Massachusetts House of Representatives and as Corporation Counsel of Boston. He was first elected to the House in 1996. He resigned effective January 31, 2014 to take a position as chief legal counsel for Boston mayor Marty Walsh and the City of Boston. He served as corporation counsel throughout Walsh's term and resigned after Walsh was nominated to become United States Secretary of Labor. In April 2021 he joined the law firm of Sullivan & Worcester.

== Education ==
O'Flaherty graduated from Suffolk University with a Bachelor of Science and from Massachusetts School of Law with a Juris Doctor.

== Political career ==
O'Flaherty served as an associate member of the Chelsea Zoning Board of Appeals until 1997. Elected in 1996, he served in the Massachusetts House of Representatives representing the 2nd Suffolk district from 1997 to 2014. While serving in the state house, he served on the Education, Arts and Humanities Committee, Banks and Banking Committee, and Judiciary Committee. He served as Chairman and Vice Chairman of the Judiciary Committee and Vice Chairman of the Banks and Banking Committee. From 2014 to 2021 he served as Corporation Counsel of Boston, Massachusetts.

== Legal career ==
O'Flaherty practices law in Massachusetts and was a partner with the law firm of O'Donovan, Dwyer & O'Flaherty, P.C. In 2021 he joined the firm of Sullivan & Worcester.
