= Massachusetts Senate's Middlesex and Suffolk district =

American legislative district

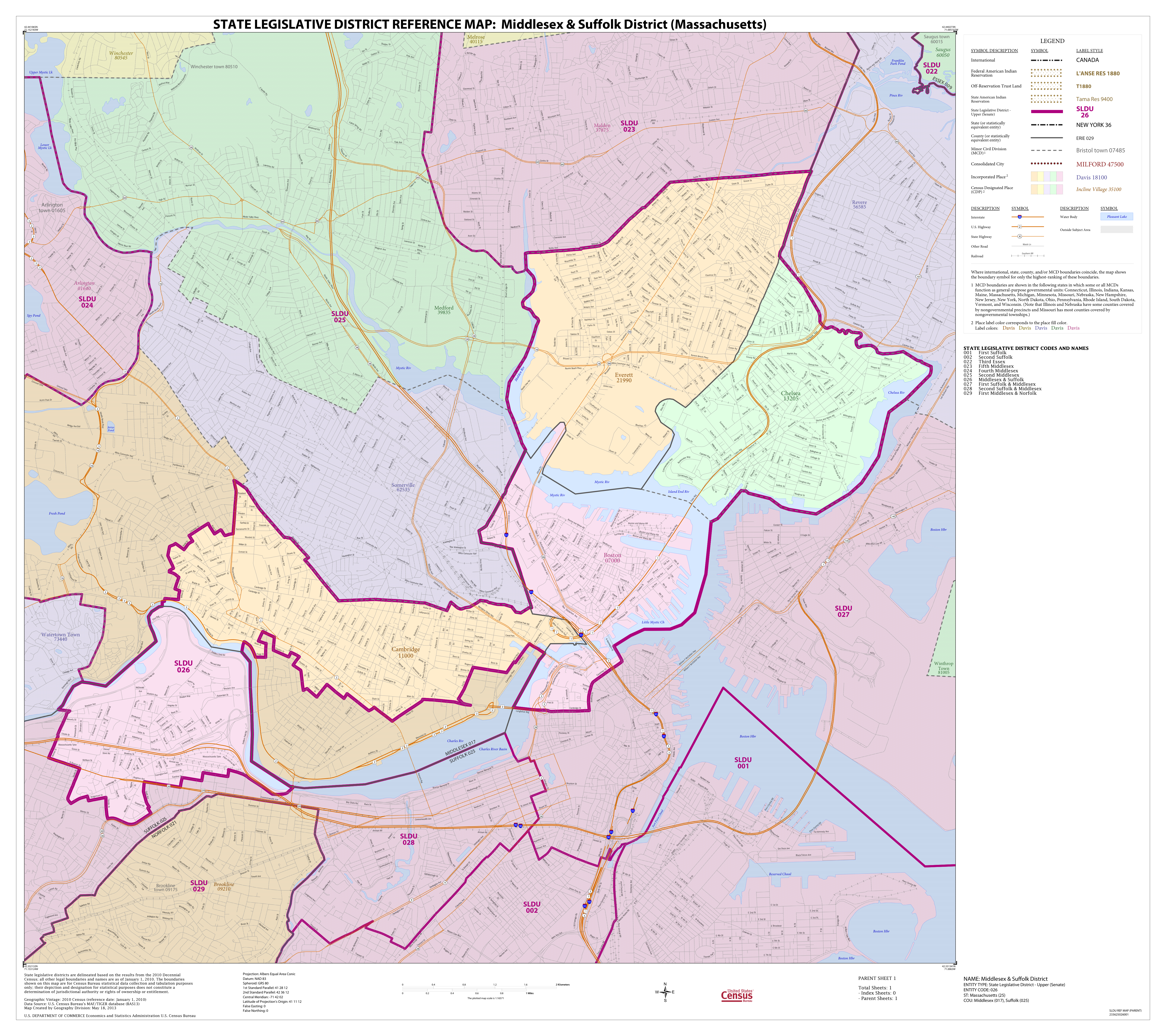
Map of Massachusetts Senate's Middlesex and Suffolk district, based on the 2010 United States census.

Massachusetts Senate's Middlesex and Suffolk district in the United States is one of 40 legislative districts of the Massachusetts Senate. It covers 6.4% of Middlesex County and 10.4% of Suffolk County population in 2010. Democrat Sal DiDomenico of Everett has represented the district since 2013.

== Locales represented ==
The district includes the following localities:

- most of Allston
- part of Cambridge
- Charlestown
- Chelsea
- Everett
- Boston’s West End

== Senators ==
- Benjamin J. Bowen, circa 1945
- Richard Henry Lee, circa 1953
- Donald Linwood Gibbs, circa 1957
- Francis X. McCann, circa 1979
- George Bachrach, circa 1985
- Michael John Barrett, circa 1993
- Sal N. DiDomenico, 2010-current

== Images ==
Portraits of legislators

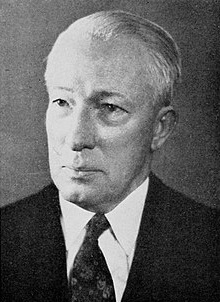
Benjamin Bowen

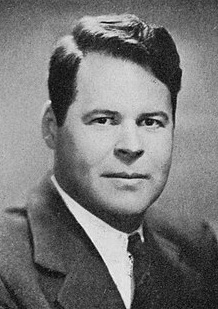
Richard Henry Lee

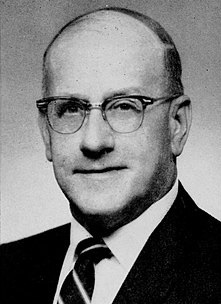
Francis McCann

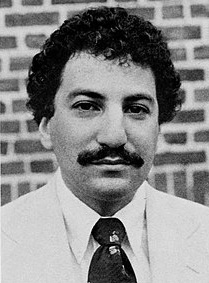
George Bachrach

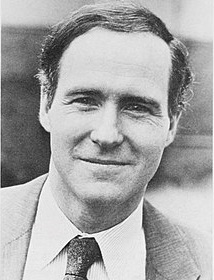
Michael John Barrett

== See also ==
- List of Massachusetts Senate elections
- List of Massachusetts General Courts
- List of former districts of the Massachusetts Senate
- Middlesex County districts of the Massachusetts House of Representatives: 1st, 2nd, 3rd, 4th, 5th, 6th, 7th, 8th, 9th, 10th, 11th, 12th, 13th, 14th, 15th, 16th, 17th, 18th, 19th, 20th, 21st, 22nd, 23rd, 24th, 25th, 26th, 27th, 28th, 29th, 30th, 31st, 32nd, 33rd, 34th, 35th, 36th, 37th
- Suffolk County districts of the Massachusetts House of Representatives: 1st, 2nd, 3rd, 4th, 5th, 6th, 7th, 8th, 9th, 10th, 11th, 12th, 13th, 14th, 15th, 16th, 17th, 18th, 19th
