= Judith García =

American politician

Member of the Massachusetts House of Representatives from the 11th Suffolk district
- Incumbent
- Assumed office January 4, 2023
- Preceded by: Liz Malia

Personal details
- Party: Democratic
- Education: Wheaton College (MA)
- Website: Official website

Judith A. García is an American politician who has served as a member of the Massachusetts House of Representatives from the 11th Suffolk district since 2023. She is a member of the Democratic Party.
