= Marc Draisen =

American politician (born 1956)

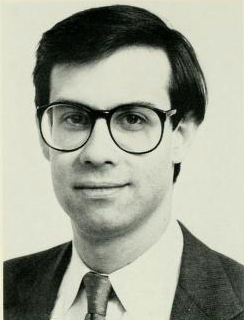

Member of the Massachusetts House of Representatives from the 11th Suffolk District
- In office 1991–1995
- Preceded by: Eleanor Myerson
- Succeeded by: John E. McDonough

Personal details
- Born: December 22, 1956 (age 69) Boston, Massachusetts
- Party: Democratic
- Education: Boston Latin School; Brandeis University; Massachusetts Institute of Technology
- Occupation: Urban planner Politician

Marc D. Draisen (born December 22, 1956, in Boston, Massachusetts) is an American Urban planner and politician who represented the 11th Suffolk district in the Massachusetts House of Representatives from 1991 to 1995. He was a candidate for Lieutenant Governor of Massachusetts in 1994, but lost in the Democratic primary to Bob Massie.

Draisen is currently the executive director of the Metropolitan Area Planning Council. He is also the former chairman of Massachusetts Voters for Clean Elections and the former president and executive director of the Massachusetts Association of Community Development Corporations. He has a wife Sara Barcan, one son, Samuel Draisen, and one daughter Katie Draisen. He is Jewish.

== See also ==
- 1991–1992 Massachusetts legislature
- 1993–1994 Massachusetts legislature
