= Shirley Arriaga =

American politician

Member of the Massachusetts House of Representatives from the 8th Hampden district
- Incumbent
- Assumed office January 4, 2023
- Preceded by: Joseph Wagner

Personal details
- Party: Democratic
- Education: Springfield Technical Community College (AA); Elms College (BA); Community College of the Air Force (AS); Western New England University (LLM)

Military service
- Branch/service: United States Air Force
- Years of service: 2010–2020

Shirley B. Arriaga (/ɑːriɑːɡə/) is an American politician serving as a member of the Massachusetts House of Representatives for the 8th Hampden district. Elected in November 2022, she assumed office on January 4, 2023.

== Early life and education ==
Arriaga was raised in Chicopee, Massachusetts, the fourth of five children. She earned an associate degree in liberal arts and sciences from Springfield Technical Community College, a Bachelor of Arts degree in legal studies and paralegal certificate from Elms College, an associate degree in aerospace, aeronautical, and astronautical engineering from the Community College of the Air Force, and a Master of Laws from the Western New England University School of Law.

== Career ==
From 2010 to 2020, Arriaga served in the United States Air Force. She also worked as a veterans liaison for Congressman Richard Neal. Arriaga has since worked as an educator at Chicopee High School. She was elected to the Massachusetts House of Representatives in November 2022.

In early 2023, Arriaga cosponsored a bill to allow Massachusetts prisoners to earn time off from their sentences by immediately forfeiting some of their vital organs and/or bone marrow to the state.
