= Daniel Joseph Ryan =

American politician

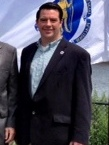
- Ryan in 2014

Member of the Massachusetts House of Representatives from the 2nd Suffolk district
- Incumbent
- Assumed office April 16, 2014
- Preceded by: Eugene O'Flaherty

Personal details
- Party: Democratic

Daniel Joseph Ryan is an American politician to the Massachusetts House of Representatives. He is a Democrat from Boston, Massachusetts who was sworn on April 16, 2014 to represent the 2nd Suffolk seat. He won the March 4 primary and the April 1 special election called after the resignation of Eugene O'Flaherty.

== See also ==
- 2019–2020 Massachusetts legislature
- 2021–2022 Massachusetts legislature
