= Eleanor Myerson =

American politician

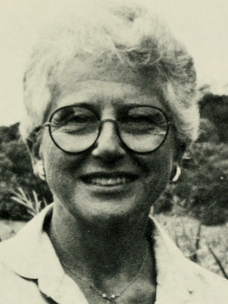

Member of the Massachusetts House of Representatives from the 11th Suffolk district
- In office 1983–1991
- Succeeded by: Marc Draisen

Eleanor Myerson (c. 1922–2016) was an American Democratic politician from in Brookline, Massachusetts. She represented the 11th Suffolk district in the Massachusetts House of Representatives from 1983 to 1991.

She was born in Winthrop, Massachusetts. On November 20, 2016, at age 94, she died at Falmouth Hospital after a cerebral hemorrhage.

== Personal life ==
She was Jewish.
