= Valerie Barsom =

American politician (born 1960)

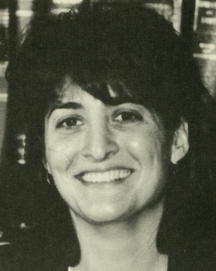

Member of the Massachusetts House of Representatives from the 13th Hampden district
- In office 1993–1996
- Preceded by: Robert L. Howarth
- Succeeded by: Gale D. Candaras

Personal details
- Born: November 11, 1960 (age 65) Springfield, Massachusetts, U.S.
- Party: Republican
- Education: Clark University (BA); New England Law Boston (JD)

Valerie Barsom (born November 11, 1960) is an American attorney and politician who served as a member of the Massachusetts House of Representatives for the 13th Hampden district from 1993 to 1996.

== Early life and education ==
Barsom was born in Springfield, Massachusetts. She earned a Bachelor of Arts degree in government from Clark University in 1982 and a Juris Doctor from New England Law Boston in 1991.

== Career ==
Barsom was elected to the Massachusetts House of Representatives in 1992 and assumed office in 1993. She withdrew from re-election in 1996 to accept a position as legal counsel of the Massachusetts Turnpike Authority. She started her own legal practice in 1997.

== Electoral history ==
Barsom, who lived in Wilbraham, was the Republican nominee for the 13th Hampden district seat in 1992, and the Massachusetts Elections Division's records show her winning the Republican primary unopposed and then the general election with 57% of the vote against one opponent. She was unopposed in the 1994 Republican primary and won re-election that November with 69% of the vote against Democrat Alan S. Peck, also of Wilbraham. In 1996 she won the Republican primary with 64% of the vote against one opponent, but the seat went to Democrat Gale D. Candaras, who won the general election with 61% of the vote against two opponents.

== Billboard proposal ==
In December 2019, the Boston Zoning Board of Appeal rejected for the second time in two years, by a 3–3 vote (five votes were needed for approval),a proposal by Barsom for a digital billboard atop the American Cleaning Co. building on Lincoln Street in Brighton, next to the Massachusetts Turnpike. Her attorney said it was the last spot along the turnpike in Boston where she could have put a billboard, because of state rules limiting the spacing of large billboards, and board chair Christine Araujo noted that billboards had been banned in Allston/Brighton zoning since 1991.
