= Massachusetts Senate's Cape and Islands district =

American legislative district

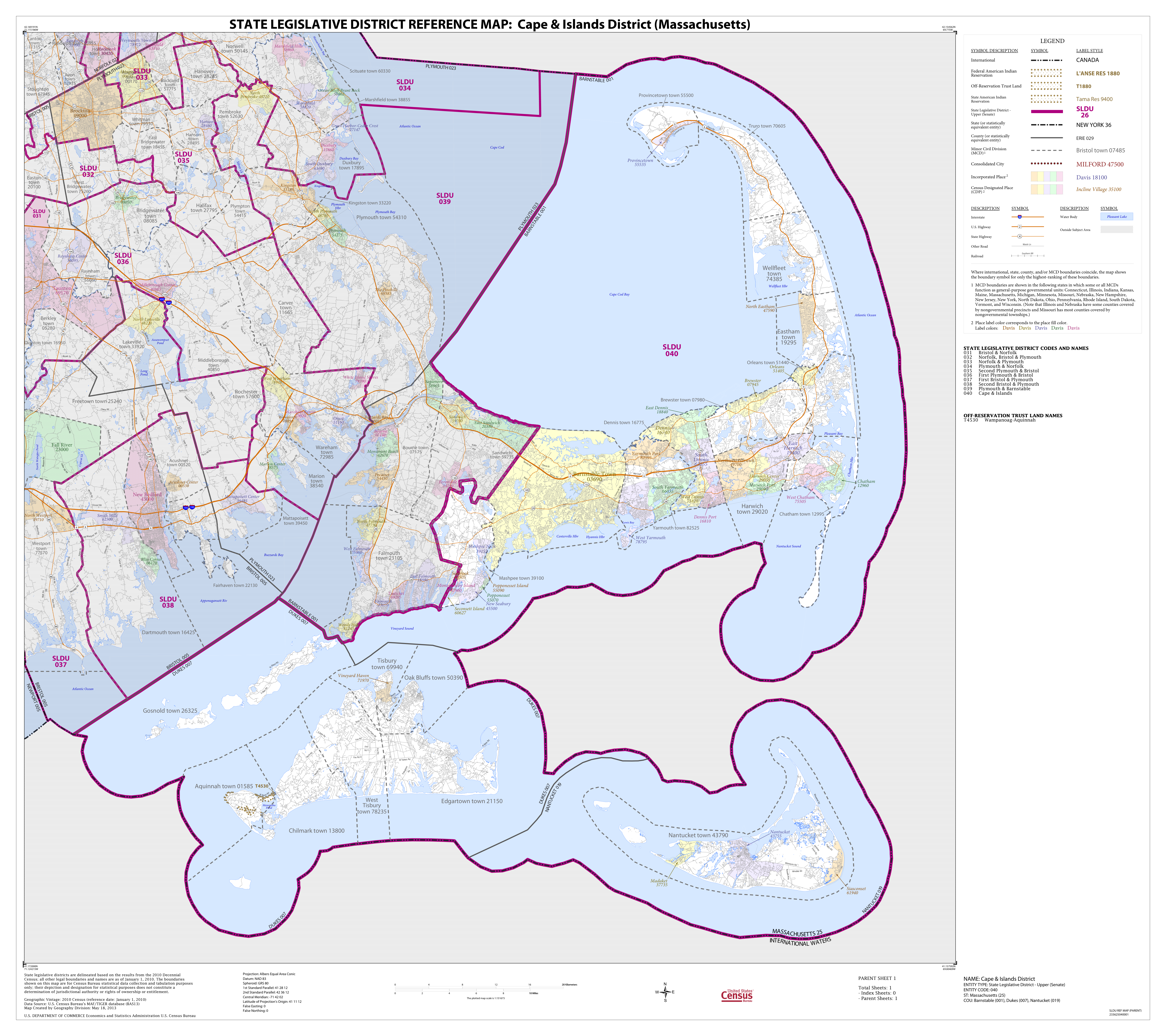
Map of Massachusetts Senate's Cape and Islands district, based on the 2010 United States census.

Massachusetts Senate's Cape and Islands district in the United States is one of 40 legislative districts of the Massachusetts Senate. It covers 66.7% of Barnstable County, all of Dukes County, and all of Nantucket County population in 2010. Democrat Julian Cyr of Truro has represented the district since 2017. He ran unopposed for re-election in the 2020 Massachusetts general election.

== Towns represented ==
The district includes the following localities:

- Aquinnah
- Barnstable
- Brewster
- Chatham
- Chilmark
- Dennis
- Eastham
- Edgartown
- Gosnold
- Harwich
- Mashpee
- Nantucket
- Oak Bluffs
- Orleans
- Provincetown
- Tisbury
- Truro
- Wellfleet
- West Tisbury
- Yarmouth

The current district geographic boundary overlaps with those of the Massachusetts House of Representatives' 1st Barnstable, 2nd Barnstable, 3rd Barnstable, 4th Barnstable, 5th Barnstable, and Barnstable, Dukes & Nantucket districts.

== List of senators ==
Senator	Party	Years	Electoral history
Jack Aylmer	Republican	1971 – 1981	Elected in 1970. Re-elected in 1972. Re-elected in 1974. Re-elected in 1976. Re-elected in 1978. Re-elected in 1980. Resigned to become President of the Massachusetts Maritime Academy.
Paul V. Doane	Republican	1981 – 1989	Elected in 1981. Re-elected in 1982. Re-elected in 1984. Re-elected in 1986.
Henri S. Rauschenbach	Republican	1989 – January 3, 2001	Elected in 1988. Re-elected in 1990. Re-elected in 1992. Re-elected in 1994. Re-elected in 1996. Re-elected in 1998.
Robert O'Leary	Democratic	January 3, 2001 – January 5, 2011	Elected in 2000. Re-elected in 2002. Re-elected in 2004. Re-elected in 2006. Re-elected in 2008. Ran for U.S. House in 2010.
Dan Wolf	Democratic	January 5, 2011 – January 4, 2017	Elected in 2010. Re-elected in 2012. Re-elected in 2014. Retired.
Julian Cyr	Democratic	January 4, 2017–	Elected in 2016. Re-elected in 2018. Re-elected in 2020.

== See also ==
- List of Massachusetts Senate elections
- List of Massachusetts General Courts
- List of former districts of the Massachusetts Senate
