= John George Jr. =

American politician

Member of the Massachusetts House of Representatives from the 9th Bristol District
- In office 1989–1991
- Preceded by: Roger Tougas
- Succeeded by: [Leonard Gonsalves]

Personal details
- Born: July 31, 1946 (age 80) Dartmouth, Massachusetts
- Party: Democratic
- Education: Bryant College
- Occupation: Businessman; Farmer; Politician

John George Jr. (born July 31, 1946, in Dartmouth, Massachusetts) is an American businessman, farmer, and Democratic Party politician who represented the 9th Bristol District in the Massachusetts House of Representatives from 1989 to 1991. He resigned six months into his second term due to a conflict of interest issue.

George was found guilty in April 2015 of embezzling federal funds from the Union Street Bus Company, a firm that he owned, and using that money to benefit his personal farm in Dartmouth, and he was sentenced to 70 months in prison and ordered to pay $688,772 in restitution to SRTA, with which his company was contracted. He was held at the Federal Medical Center, Devens, and his inmate number was 96292-038.

In late December 2015, over 1 million dollars in cash owned by George was found by the United States Marshals Service. The money, located in safe deposit boxes at various locations, was found during raids in New Bedford and Fairhaven, Massachusetts.
