= George Bachrach =

American politician (born 1951)

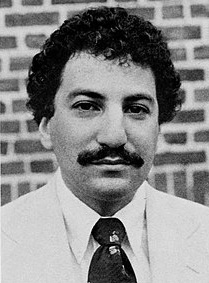
- George Bachrach, circa 1983

Member of the Massachusetts Senate from the Middlesex and Suffolk District district
- In office 1981 - 1987
- Preceded by: Francis X. McCann
- Succeeded by: Michael J. Barrett

Personal details
- Born: December 2, 1951 (age 74) New York City
- Party: Democratic
- Spouse: Susan Centofanti
- Education: Trinity College; Boston University School of Law
- Occupation: Attorney; Educator

George A. Bachrach (born December 2, 1951) is the former president of the Environmental League of Massachusetts, having former careers as an American politician, attorney, and journalism professor at Boston University.

== Biography ==
A 1973 graduate of Trinity College and a 1976 graduate of Boston University School of Law, Bachrach worked as an Assistant District Attorney in Middlesex County and as a campaign manager and administrative assistant for Congressman Ed Markey before his election to the State Senate in 1980.

After leaving the state senate, Bachrach practiced law for nearly a decade as a partner with the Boston law firm Brown, Rudnick, Freed, and Gesmer. He then founded Bachrach & Company, a public affairs and strategic marketing firm. He regularly provides commentary on New England Cable News as well as for other Boston newspapers, area television stations, and radio stations. He taught journalism at Boston University.

Bachrach retired as the president of the non-profit Environmental League of Massachusetts in 2017 where he and his staff advocated for strong environmental laws and regulations on a broad range of environmental issues, voice the concerns of citizens, and educate the public.

George's political career did not end after serving for three terms in the Massachusetts state senate. Bachrach ran for a seat in the United States House of Representatives in 1986. He finished second in a seven-way Democratic primary in the Massachusetts's 8th congressional district behind Joseph Patrick Kennedy II, who later won the general election.

Bachrach also ran for Governor of Massachusetts in 1994, but did not win. In 1998, he again sought the Democratic nomination for the 8th District seat in the United States House of Representatives and finished third in the primary.

== See also ==
- 1985–1986 Massachusetts legislature
