= Lincoln P. Cole =

American politician

Lincoln Porteous Cole, Jr. (September 18, 1918 – July 28, 1999) was an American politician.

Born in Fall River, Massachusetts, he went to Northbridge High School and Northeastern University School of Law. Cole served as Lexington town selectman and moderator. He served in the Massachusetts House of Representatives representing Lexington from 1965 until 1980 as a Republican.

== See also ==
- Massachusetts House of Representatives' 15th Middlesex district
