= John E. McDonough =

American politician

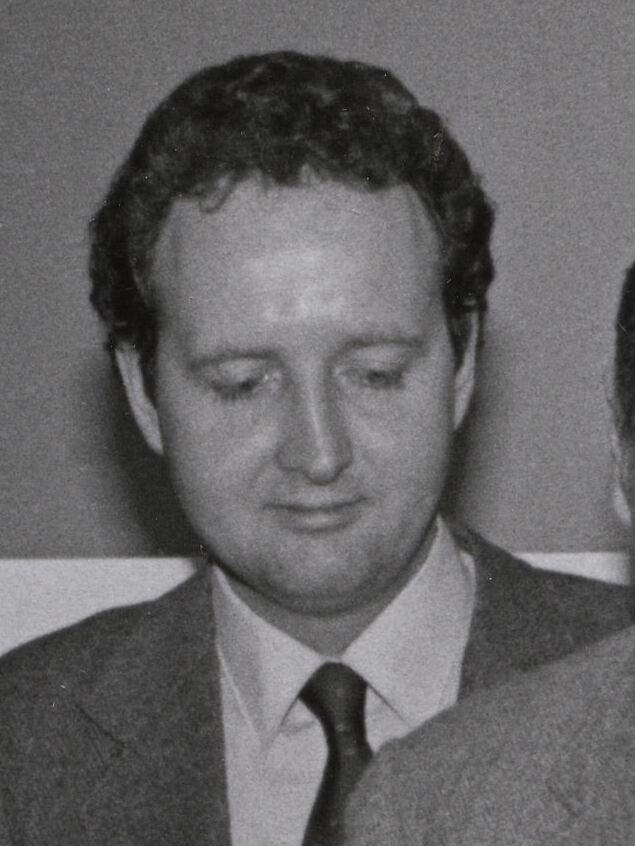
- McDonough in the 1980s

Member of the Massachusetts House of Representatives from the 11th Suffolk District
- In office 1995–1997
- Preceded by: Marc Draisen
- Succeeded by: Liz Malia

Member of the Massachusetts House of Representatives from the 12th Suffolk District
- In office 1985–1995
- Preceded by: James J. Craven, Jr.
- Succeeded by: Thomas Finneran

Personal details
- Born: May 21, 1953 (age 73) Waltham, Massachusetts
- Party: Democratic
- Education: Boston College; Harvard University; University of Michigan
- Occupation: Politician; Professor

John E. McDonough (born May 21, 1953) is an American professor of public health practice at the Harvard School of Public Health. He was also a politician who was a member of the Massachusetts House of Representatives from 1985 to 1997.

McDonough resigned in November 1997 to accept a teaching position at Brandeis University. Between 2003 and 2008, he was the executive director of Health Care For All. Between 2008 and 2010, he served as a senior advisor on National Health Reform for the U.S. Senate Committee on Health, Education, Labor, and Pensions. In 2010, he was the Joan Tisch Distinguished Fellow in Public Health at Hunter College in New York City. Beginning in January, 2011, he is a professor of public health practice at the Harvard School of Public Health. In the 2014 Massachusetts gubernatorial election, McDonough endorsed Don Berwick for Governor of Massachusetts.

McDonough is the author of three books: Inside National Health Reform, published by the University of California Press and the Milbank Fund in 2011; Experiencing Politics: A Legislator's Stories of Government and Health Care published by the University of California Press and the Milbank Fund in 2000, and Interests, Ideas, and Deregulation: the Fate of Hospital Rate Setting published by the University of Michigan Press in 1998. His articles have been published in Health Affairs, the New England Journal of Medicine, and other journals. He has written numerous op-ed articles for the Kaiser News Service, the Boston Globe, and other publications. He is the author of a regular blog on the Boston Globe website, boston.com, called Health Stew.

== Education ==
He received a doctorate in public health in 1996 from the School of Public Health at the University of Michigan and a master's in public administration from the John F. Kennedy School of Government at Harvard in 1990.

== Personal life ==
McDonough is a vegan.
