= Patrick Landers =

American politician

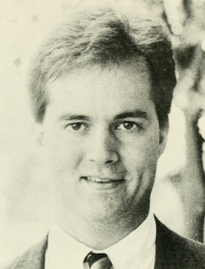
- Portrait of Patrick Landers

Member of the Massachusetts House of Representatives from the 1st Hampden District
- In office 1987–1999
- Preceded by: William Moriarty
- Succeeded by: Reed V. Hillman

Personal details
- Born: September 20, 1959 (age 67) Springfield, Massachusetts
- Party: Democratic
- Education: University of Massachusetts Amherst; Suffolk University
- Occupation: Politician

Patrick F. Landers III (born September 20, 1959 in Springfield, Massachusetts) is an American politician who represented the 1st Hampden District in the Massachusetts House of Representatives from 1987–1999 and was the assistant state treasurer for debt management from 1999–2007.

He subsequently became a senior vice president at Lehman Brothers.
