= Kevin O'Sullivan (politician) =

American politician

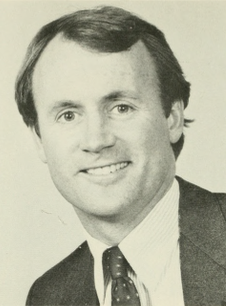
- Portrait of Kevin O'Sullivan

Member of the Massachusetts House of Representatives from the 13th Worcester District
- In office 1987–1995
- Preceded by: Thomas P. White
- Succeeded by: Harriette L. Chandler

Personal details
- Born: September 30, 1953 (age 73) Norwalk, Connecticut, U.S.
- Party: Democratic
- Education: Springfield College; Clark University

Kevin O'Sullivan is an American non-profit executive and politician who served as president and CEO of Massachusetts Biomedical Initiatives from 2003 to 2018 and represented the 13th Worcester District in the Massachusetts House of Representatives from 1987 to 1995.

== Early life ==
O'Sullivan was born on September 30, 1953, in Norwalk, Connecticut. He graduated from Doherty Memorial High School in Worcester, Massachusetts, and earned a B.S. from Springfield College and a M.P.A. from Clark University.

== Public service ==
=== Early career ===
O'Sullivan spent five years as director of the Friendly House, a Worcester community center. From 1981 to 1986 he was the vice president of the Worcester Area Chamber of Commerce.

=== State legislature ===
From 1987 to 1995, O'Sullivan represented the 13th Worcester District in the Massachusetts House of Representatives. During his tenure, O'Sullivan led an effort to reform welfare programs, helped establish and served as the first House chairman of the Central Massachusetts Legislative Caucus, served on the House Ways and Means Committee, was vice chairman of the House Ethics Committee, and was House chairman of the Legislative Redistricting Committee. In 1994 he sought the United States House of Representatives seat in Massachusetts's 3rd congressional district. He ran as a moderate "New Democrat" and a D.C. outsider against longtime Congressional aide and the more liberal Jim McGovern. He defeated McGovern 38% to 30% in the Democratic primary, but lost the general election to Republican incumbent Peter Blute 55% to 44.

=== Post-legislative career ===
After losing to Blute, O'Sullivan was hired as director of marketing for the Worcester Marketing Corp, a public private partnership between the Worcester Area Chamber of Commerce and the city of Worcester that was responsible for implementing a marketing and public relations plan designed to create economic development in the city. This included promoting the city's convention center, which saw bookings 160% ahead of projections during O'Sullivan's tenure, and pitching Worcester Regional Airport to airlines. In 1998, he became the vice president of the Massachusetts Biomedical Initiatives, a non-profit that runs business incubators in Worcester. In 2003 he succeeded Mark Roosevelt as president and CEO after Roosevelt decided to pursue a career in education. He remained with MBI until his retirement in 2018.
