= Massachusetts House of Representatives' 2nd Suffolk district =

American legislative district

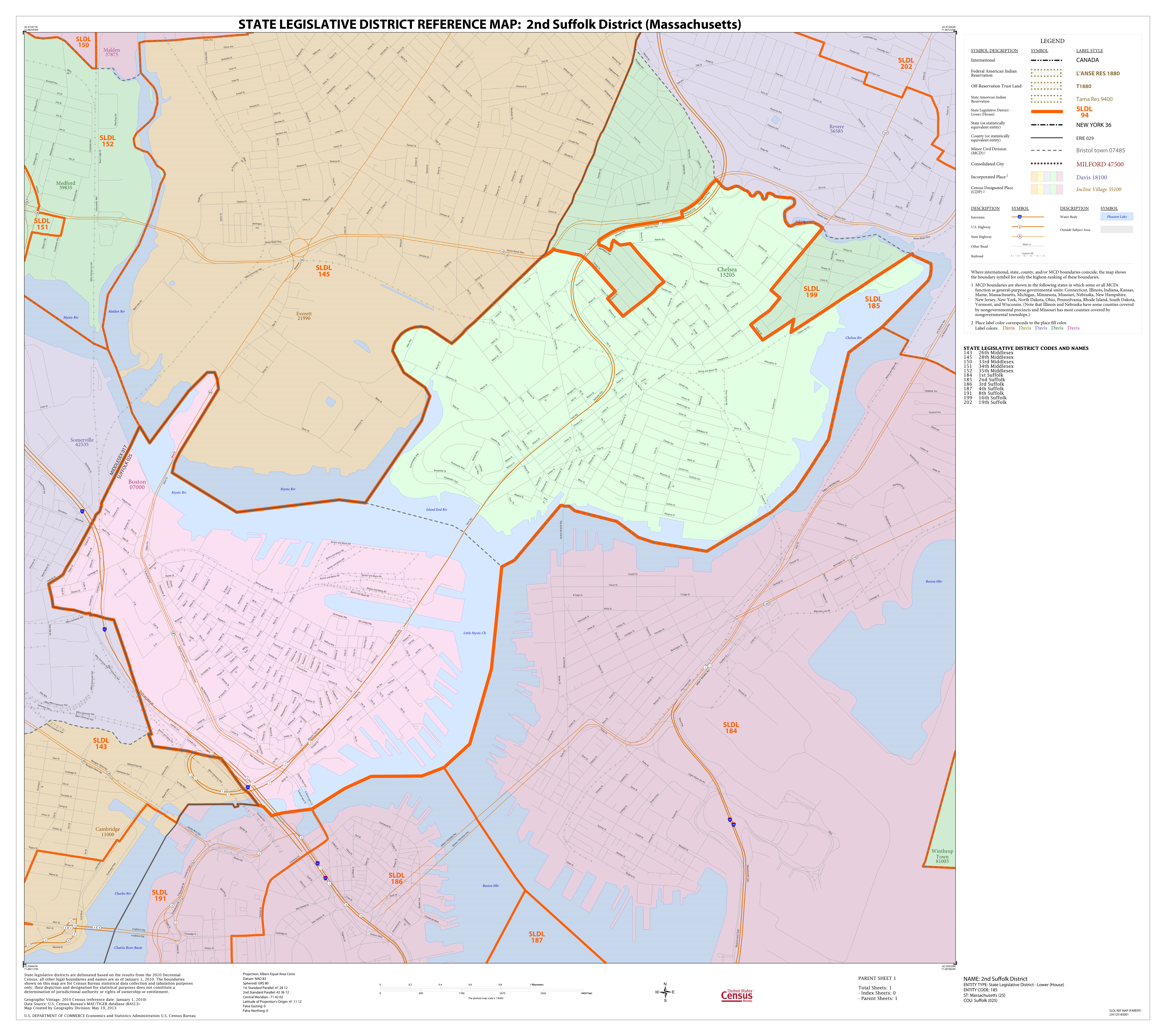
Map of Massachusetts House of Representatives' 2nd Suffolk district, based on the 2010 United States census.

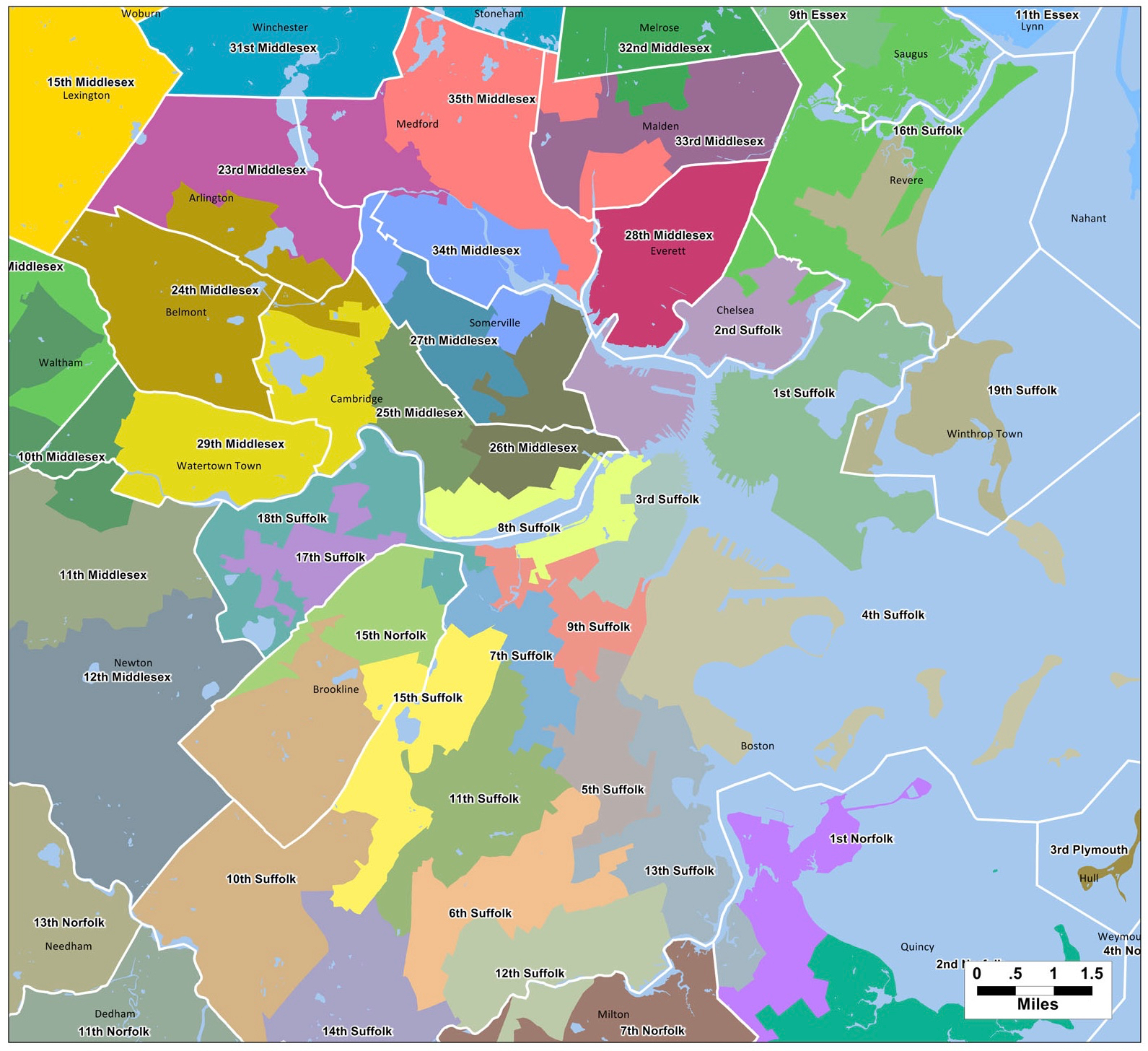
Map of Massachusetts House of Representatives districts for Suffolk County, apportioned in 2011

Massachusetts House of Representatives' 2nd Suffolk district in the United States is one of 160 legislative districts included in the lower house of the Massachusetts General Court. It covers part of the city of Boston and part of the city of Chelsea in Suffolk County. Democrat Dan Ryan of Charlestown has represented the district since 2015. Candidates for this district seat in the 2020 Massachusetts general election include the incumbent Ryan and Damali Vidot.

The current district geographic boundary overlaps with that of the Massachusetts Senate's Middlesex and Suffolk district.

== Representatives ==
- Amos A. Dunnels, circa 1858-1859
- Bradbury G. Prescott, circa 1858
- Cyrus Washburn, circa 1858
- Edward F. Porter, circa 1859
- Stephen N. Stockwell, circa 1859
- Patrick J. Kennedy, circa 1888
- Thomas O. McEnany, circa 1888
- John B. Cashman, circa 1920
- Patrick F. Moran, circa 1920
- Jeremiah Francis Brennan, circa 1951
- Dennis Kearney, circa 1975
- Richard A. Voke
- Eugene O'Flaherty
- Daniel Joseph Ryan, 2015-current

== See also ==
- List of Massachusetts House of Representatives elections
- Other Suffolk County districts of the Massachusetts House of Representatives: 1st, 3rd, 4th, 5th, 6th, 7th, 8th, 9th, 10th, 11th, 12th, 13th, 14th, 15th, 16th, 17th, 18th, 19th
- List of Massachusetts General Courts
- List of former districts of the Massachusetts House of Representatives

== Images ==
Portraits of legislators

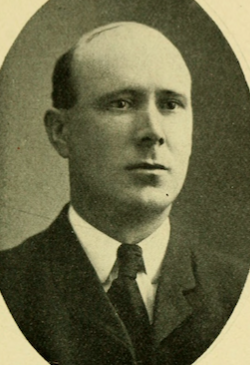
Bernard Hanrahan

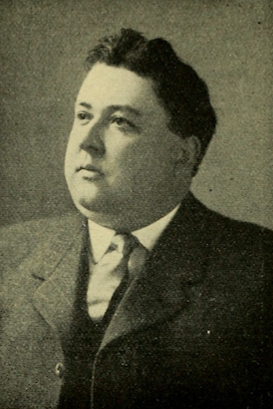
John F. Sullivan

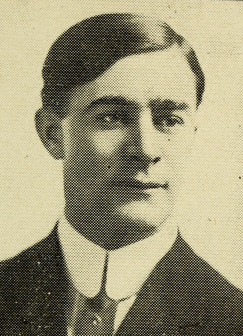
John Cashman

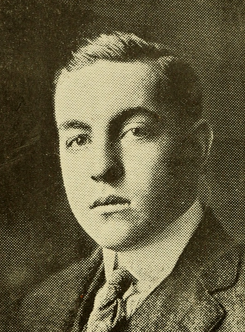
William Hearn

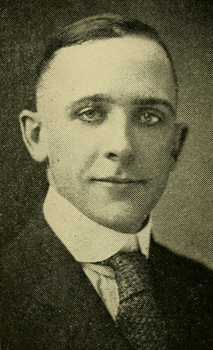
J. Frederick Curtin

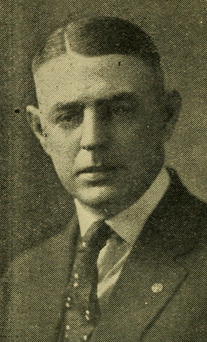
Timothy Francis Donovan

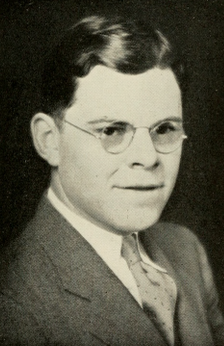
James Kiley

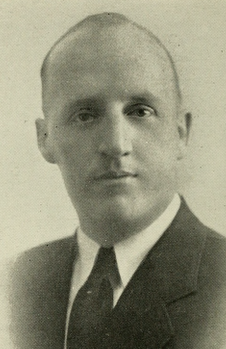
Thomas Flaherty

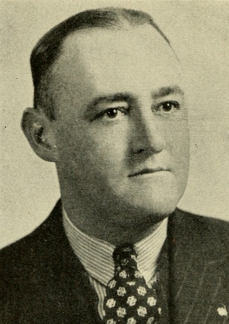
David Cleary

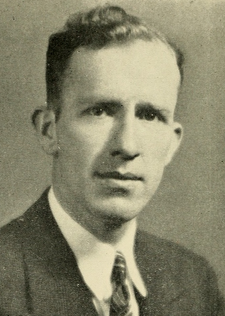
James McDevitt

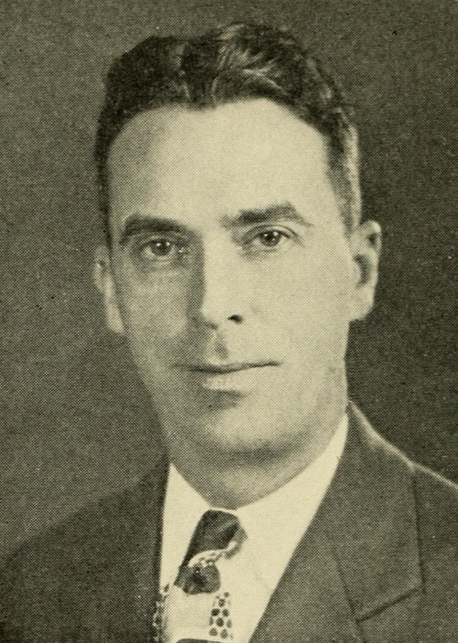
Jeremiah Francis Brennan

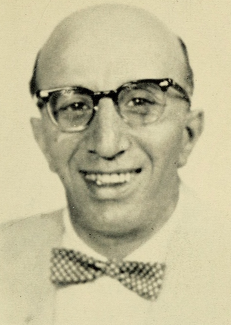
Anthony Scalli

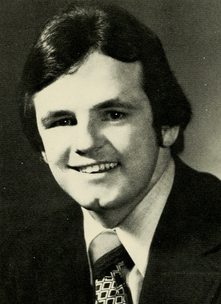
Dennis Kearney

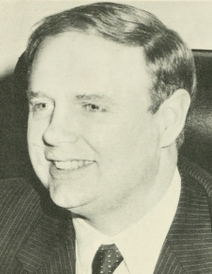
Richard Voke

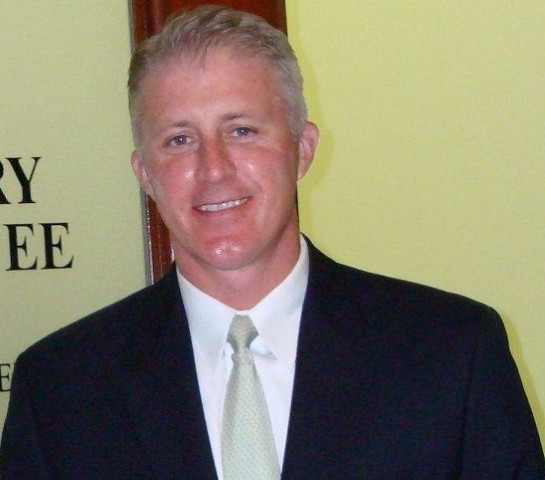
Eugene O'Flaherty
