= Paul J. Gannon =

American politician

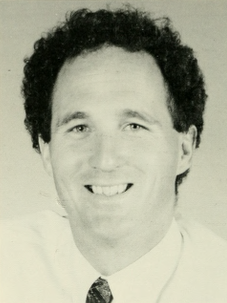
- (1993) Paul J. Gannon Massachusetts House of Representatives

Member of the Massachusetts House of Representatives from the 4th Suffolk district
- In office January 3, 1991 – January 3, 1995
- Preceded by: Michael F. Flaherty, Sr.
- Succeeded by: Stephen Lynch

Personal details
- Born: May 21, 1960 (age 66) Boston, Massachusetts
- Party: Democratic
- Occupation: Attorney

Paul J. Gannon (born May 21, 1960) is a former member of the Massachusetts House of Representatives. He is a South Boston Democrat who represented the 4th Suffolk district from 1991 to 1995. He is an attorney who graduated from Providence College and The Catholic University of America's Columbus School of Law.
