= Joseph Wagner (Massachusetts politician) =

Massachusetts politician

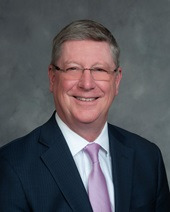

Assistant Majority Leader of the Massachusetts House of Representatives
- In office February 14, 2019 – February 11, 2021
- Preceded by: Byron Rushing
- Succeeded by: Michael Moran

Member of the Massachusetts House of Representatives from the 8th Hampden district
- In office January 2, 1991 – January 4, 2023
- Preceded by: Kenneth Lemanski
- Succeeded by: Shirley Arriaga

Personal details
- Born: May 7, 1960 (age 65) Springfield, Massachusetts
- Party: Democratic
- Education: Cathedral High School
- Alma mater: Western New England College; University of Massachusetts Amherst

Joseph F. Wagner (born May 7, 1960 in Springfield, Massachusetts) is an American politician who represents the 8th Hampden District in the Massachusetts House of Representatives. Prior to becoming a state representative, Wagner was the administrative assistant to mayor of Chicopee.

== Early life and education ==
Wagner was born in Springfield, Massachusetts and attended Cathedral High School and later attended Western New England University.

== Professional life ==
Wagner worked as the administrative aid to the Mayor of Chicopee, Massachusetts from 1988 until 1991.

== See also ==
- 2019–2020 Massachusetts legislature
- 2021–2022 Massachusetts legislature

== Notes ==
1. Sometimes erroneously referred to as Majority Whip.
