= Michael J. Barrett =

American politician

Michael Barrett
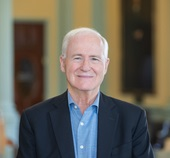

Member of the Massachusetts Senate
- Incumbent
- Assumed office 2013
- Preceded by: Susan Fargo
- Constituency: 3rd Middlesex district
- In office 1987–1995
- Preceded by: George Bachrach
- Succeeded by: Warren Tolman
- Constituency: Middlesex and Suffolk district

Member of the Massachusetts House of Representatives from the 21st Middlesex district
- In office 1979–1985
- Preceded by: Nils Nordberg
- Succeeded by: Geoffery C. Beckwith

Personal details
- Born: June 27, 1948 (age 78) Agana, Guam
- Party: Democratic
- Spouse: Nancy Dolberg
- Children: 2
- Education: Harvard University (BA); Northeastern University (JD)
- Occupation: Attorney; Politician

Michael John Barrett (born June 27, 1948) is an American politician noted for having been elected to serve in three completely different state legislative districts over the course of his political career. At present he is the state senator for the 3rd Middlesex District of Massachusetts. Barrett served in the State Senate earlier, in 1987–1994, representing another district (Cambridge, Belmont, Watertown and the Allston-Brighton neighborhood of Boston), before moving to his present home in suburban Lexington in 1996. Even earlier, in 1979–1985, he served in the Massachusetts House of Representatives from a district comprising Reading, North Reading and a portion of Wilmington.

== Early life and education ==
Barrett was born in Agana, Guam. He was the second oldest in a family of ten children, graduated from Reading (MA) High School in 1966, Harvard College magna cum laude in 1970, and Northeastern University School of Law in 1977, after which he clerked for the U.S. District Court in Washington, DC

== State representative ==
Barrett was elected to the Massachusetts House of Representatives in 1978. He ran for a seat in the United States House of Representatives in 1984, before withdrawing from the Democratic primary in the Massachusetts's 7th congressional district in deference to Ed Markey.

== State Senate ==
In 1990, during his first stint as state senator, Barrett wrote an Atlantic Monthly cover story in which he advocated a longer school day and year for American students. The article drew the attention of Massachusetts U.S. Senator Ted Kennedy, who called for a wide-ranging study of the issue. A year later, in 1991, Barrett was named one of nine members of the National Education Commission on Time and Learning, established to examine the questions raised in the Atlantic article.

In 1992 Barrett drafted and saw through to enactment domestic violence legislation for Massachusetts that was precedent-setting, in that it required judges to consult a comprehensive computerized registry of offenders before they ruled on requests for restraining orders. He was also successful as lead sponsor of major environmental legislation regulating uses of toxic materials in manufacturing within the state.

== Private sector ==
In 1994 Barrett ran unsuccessfully for Governor of Massachusetts. Departing the state senate the following year, he was named CEO and general counsel of the Visiting Nurse Associations of New England, a large home health care provider network. Several years later, he embarked on a consulting career focused on the emergence of the Internet and the development of online services involved in health care.

== Return to Senate ==
In December 2011, after a 16-year absence from politics, Barrett announced his candidacy for state senate in the 3rd Middlesex District. In September 2012 he won the Democratic nomination after an intensely contested five-candidate race. He went on to beat Republican nominee Sandra Martinez in the November 6th general election. At the time, the 3rd Middlesex District covered nine communities: Bedford, Carlisle, Chelmsford, Concord, Lexington (precincts 3, 8 and 9), Lincoln, Sudbury (precincts 1, 4 and 5), Waltham and Weston. In redistricting following the 2020 census, the Sudbury precincts were allocated elsewhere.

In January 2013 Barrett was named Senate Chair of the Joint Committee on Children, Families and Persons with Disabilities. In 2015 Barrett was named chair of the Senate Post-Audit and Oversight Committee, a unique body charged with overseeing implementation of all state programs run by the governor and his appointees. Barrett's tenure on the oversight committee was notable for the preparation and publication in November, 2016, of "Fine Time Massachusetts: Judges, Poor People. and Debtors Prison in the 21 Century," an investigation that uncovered 105 instances, drawn from just three Massachusetts counties in 2015, in which state judges had sentenced indigent defendants to jail not for criminal convictions but for their inability to pay various fines, fees, and court costs imposed during time spent in the judicial system. The report prompted change, first, by the Massachusetts judicial system, and then, in 2018 and 2022, by the Legislature and the Governor.

In 2017 he was appointed Senate Chair of the Joint Committee on Telecommunications, Utilities & Energy. Most recently, Barrett has been chief architect for the Senate of three major climate acts passed by the Legislature in as many two-year sessions. An Act Creating A Next Generation Roadmap for Massachusetts Climate Policy, came out in 2020, although its effect was delayed for a time by Republican Charlie Baker's veto, overridden by the Legislature in early 2021. 2022 saw An Act Driving Clean Energy and Offshore Wind. In 2024 came an Act Promoting a Clean Energy Grid, Advancing Equity and Protecting Ratepayers. None of these were typical “bills” in the sense that they dealt with only one or two issues. Each is an ambitious roll-up of multiple initiatives. The 2021 Act features 114 separate sections; the 2022 Act, 100 sections; and the 2024 Act, 140 sections.

== Personal life ==
Barrett lives in Lexington with his wife, an attorney. They have adult twin daughters.

== See also ==
- 1987–1988 Massachusetts legislature
- 1989–1990 Massachusetts legislature
- 2019–2020 Massachusetts legislature
- 2021–2022 Massachusetts legislature
