= Massachusetts House of Representatives' 11th Suffolk district =

American legislative district

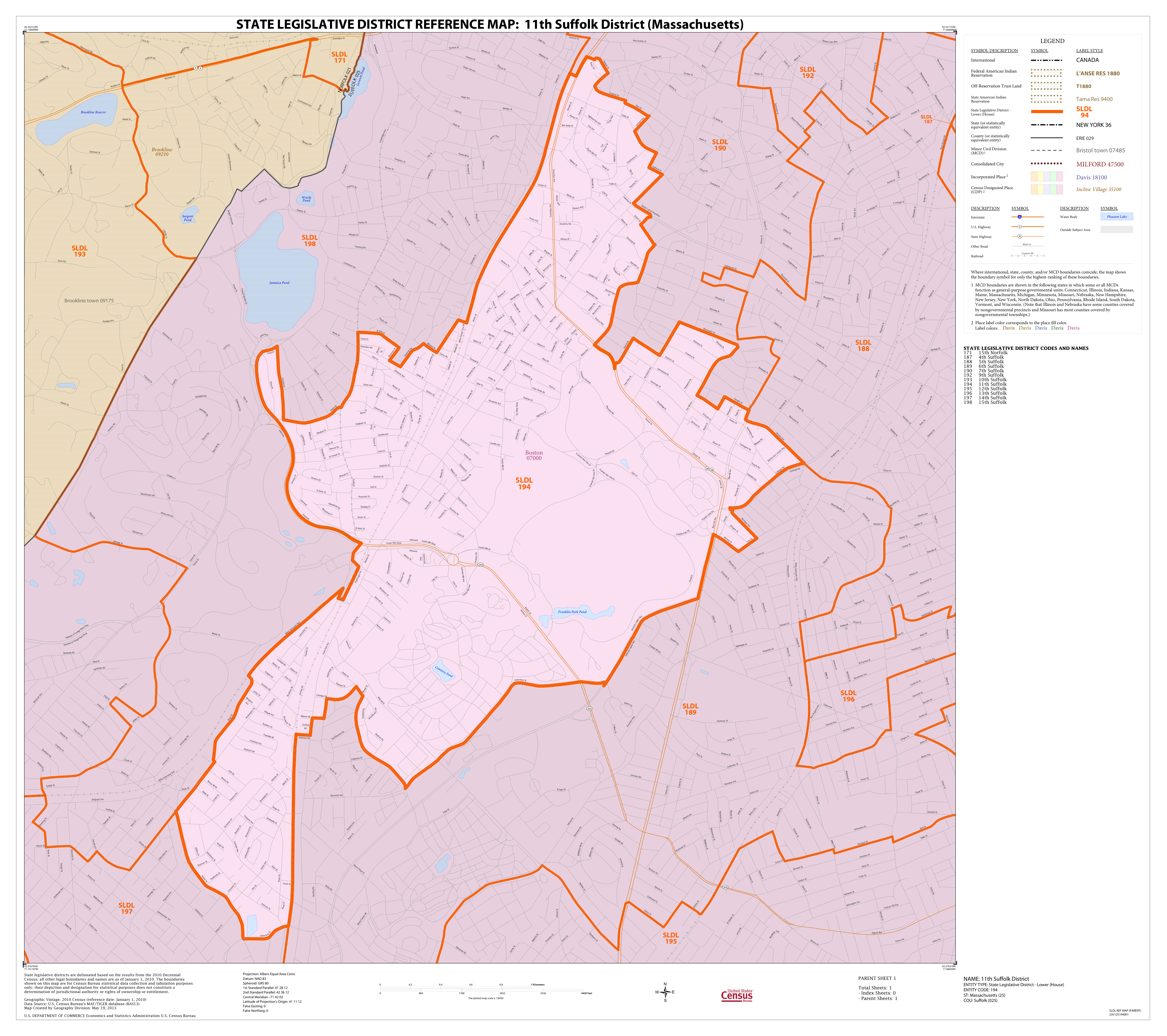
Map of Massachusetts House of Representatives' 11th Suffolk district, based on the 2010 United States census.

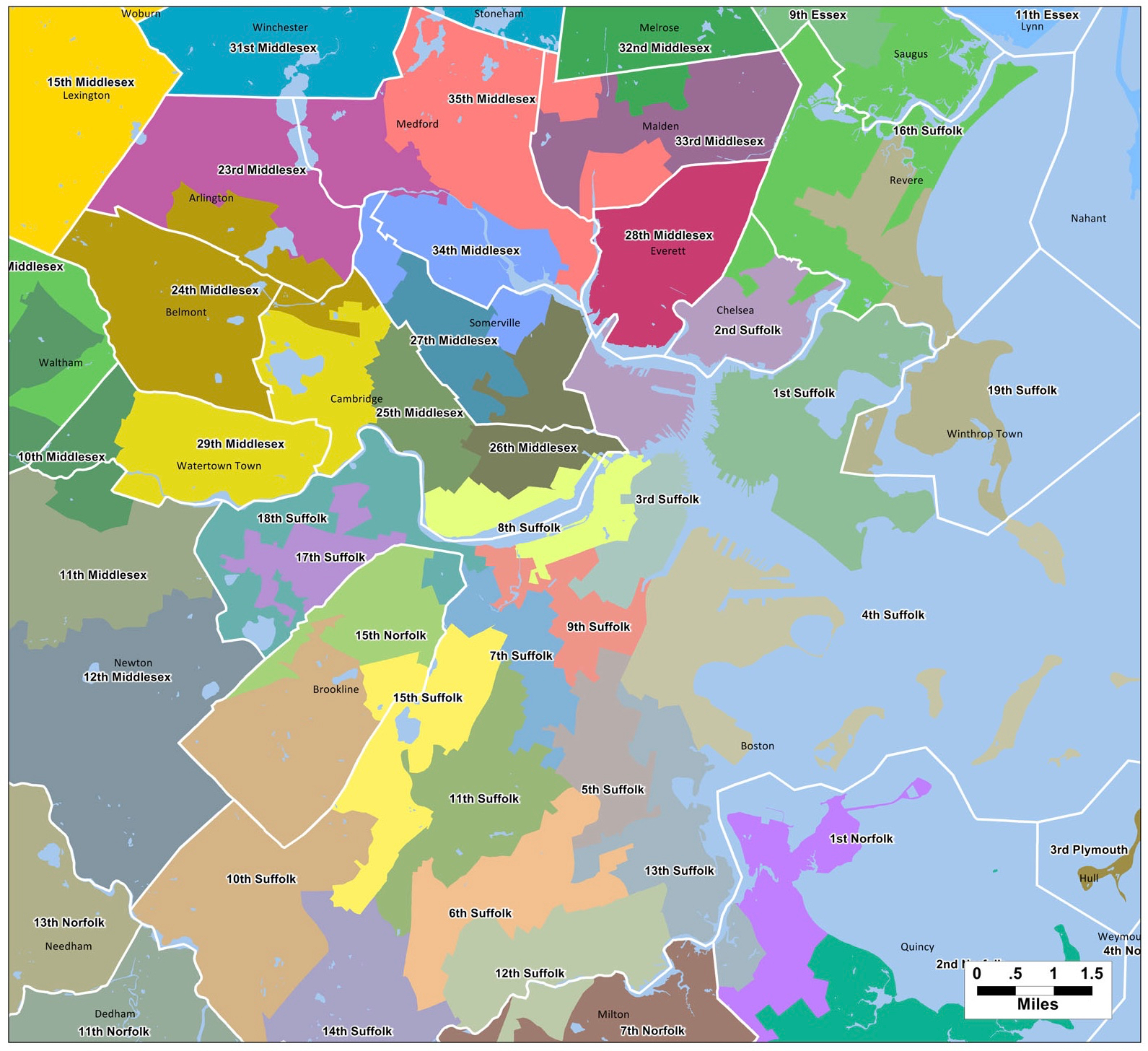
Map of Massachusetts House of Representatives districts for Suffolk County, apportioned in 2011

Massachusetts House of Representatives' 11th Suffolk district in the United States is one of 160 legislative districts included in the lower house of the Massachusetts General Court. It covers part of the city of Boston in Suffolk County. Democrat Judith García has represented the district since 2023.

The current district geographic boundary overlaps with those of the Massachusetts Senate's Norfolk and Suffolk district and 2nd Suffolk district.

== Representatives ==
- Amos B. Merrill, circa 1859
- Pliny Nickerson, circa 1859
- John Farrington, circa 1858
- Joseph F. Paul, circa 1858
- Andreas Blume, circa 1888
- William Fisher Wharton, circa 1888
- John W. McCormack, circa 1920
- James B. Troy, circa 1920
- George Greene, circa 1951
- Louis K. Nathanson, circa 1951
- Kevin W. Fitzgerald, circa 1975
- Eleanor Myerson, 1983-1991
- Marc D. Draisen, 1991-1995
- John E. McDonough
- Liz Malia, 1998-2023
- Judith García, 2023–present

== See also ==
- List of Massachusetts House of Representatives elections
- Other Suffolk County districts of the Massachusetts House of Representatives: 1st, 2nd, 3rd, 4th, 5th, 6th, 7th, 8th, 9th, 10th, 12th, 13th, 14th, 15th, 16th, 17th, 18th, 19th
- List of Massachusetts General Courts
- List of former districts of the Massachusetts House of Representatives

== Images ==
Portraits of legislators

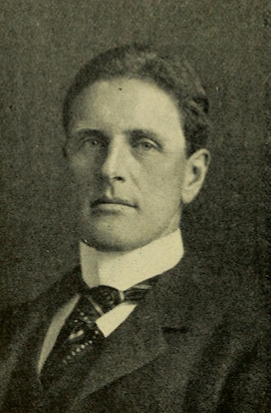
Grafton Cushing

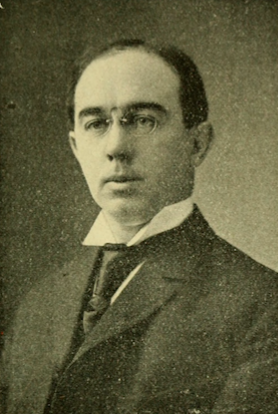
Myron Pierce

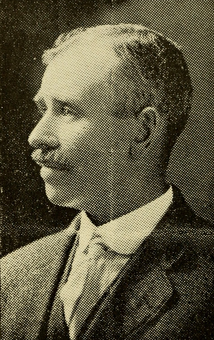
Patrick Costello

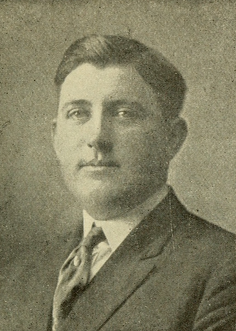
William Holland

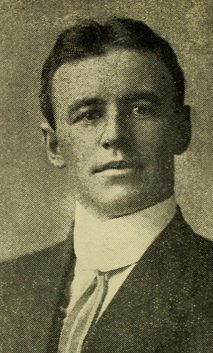
Hugh Garrity

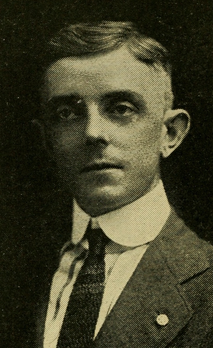
Walter Bernard Grant

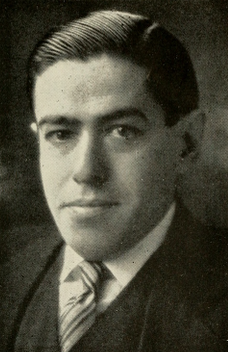
Timothy McDonough

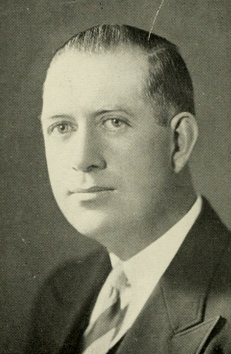
William Higgins

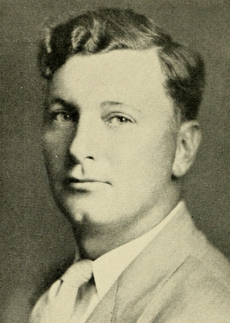
Frederick Harvey

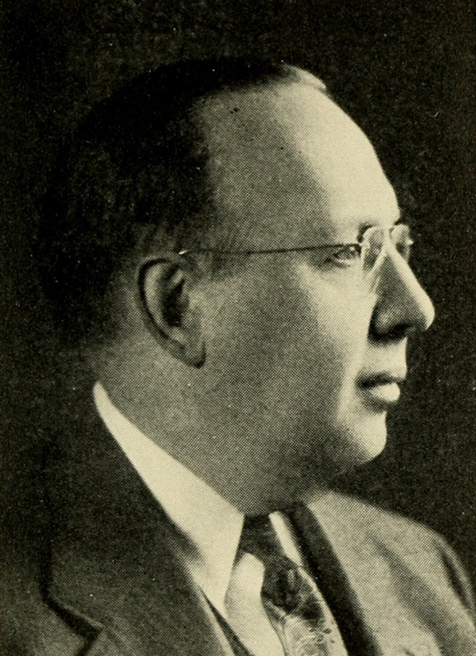
George Greene

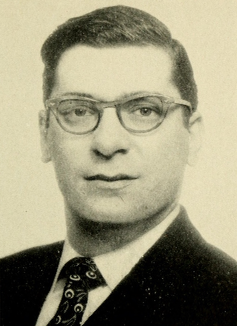
Leo Sontag

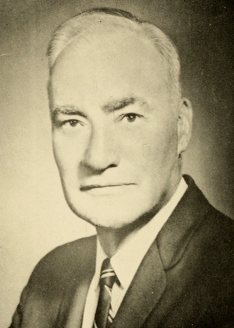
Norton O'Brien

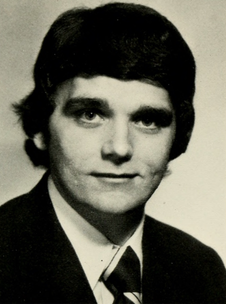
Kevin Fitzgerald

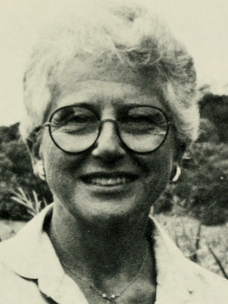
Eleanor Myerson

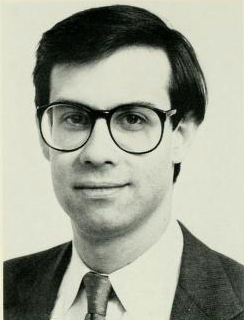
Marc Draisen

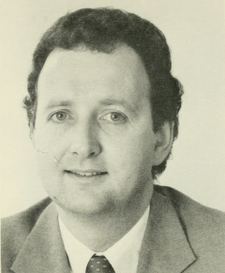
John McDonough

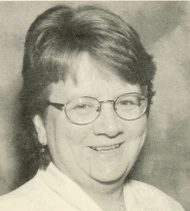
Liz Malia
