= Kevin W. Fitzgerald =

American politician

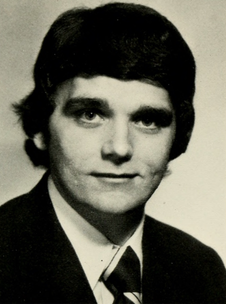
Kevin W. Fitzgerald

Kevin W. Fitzgerald (January 31, 1950 – October 1, 2007) was an American politician and guidance counselor.

Fitzgerald was born in Boston, Massachusetts. He went to Mission Hill High School and Saint Anselm College. Fitzgerald was a guidance counselor and lived in Mission Hill, Boston with his wife and family. He served in the Massachusetts House of Representatives from 1975 until 2003 and was a Democrat. He died from cancer in Boston, Massachusetts.
