= List of former districts of the Massachusetts Senate =

The following is a list of former districts of the Massachusetts Senate in the United States. The legislative districts were created to apportion elected representation in the Massachusetts Senate based on voter population. In recent decades, redistricting occurs every ten years.

== Former state senate districts ==
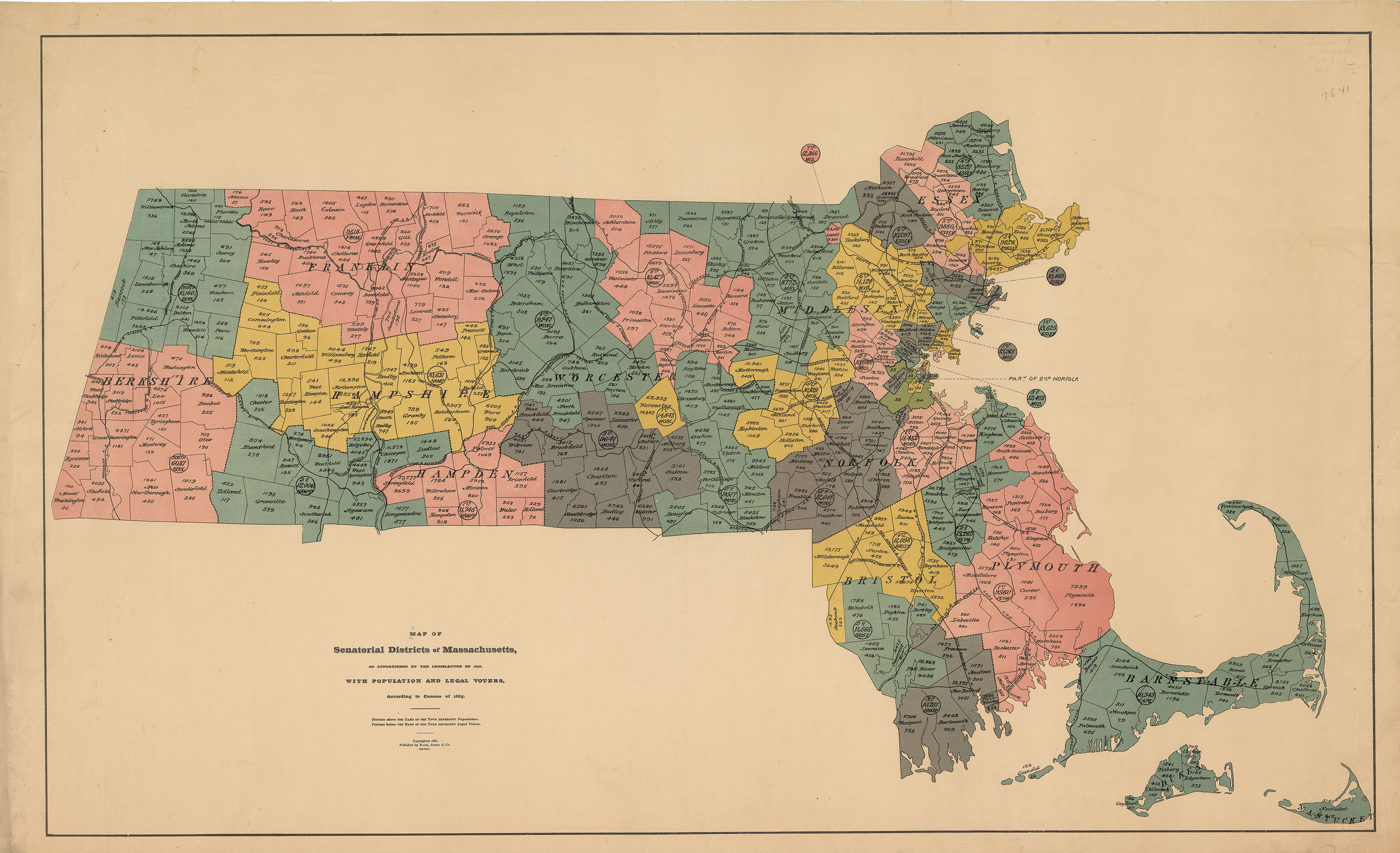
Map of Massachusetts state senate districts apportioned in 1876

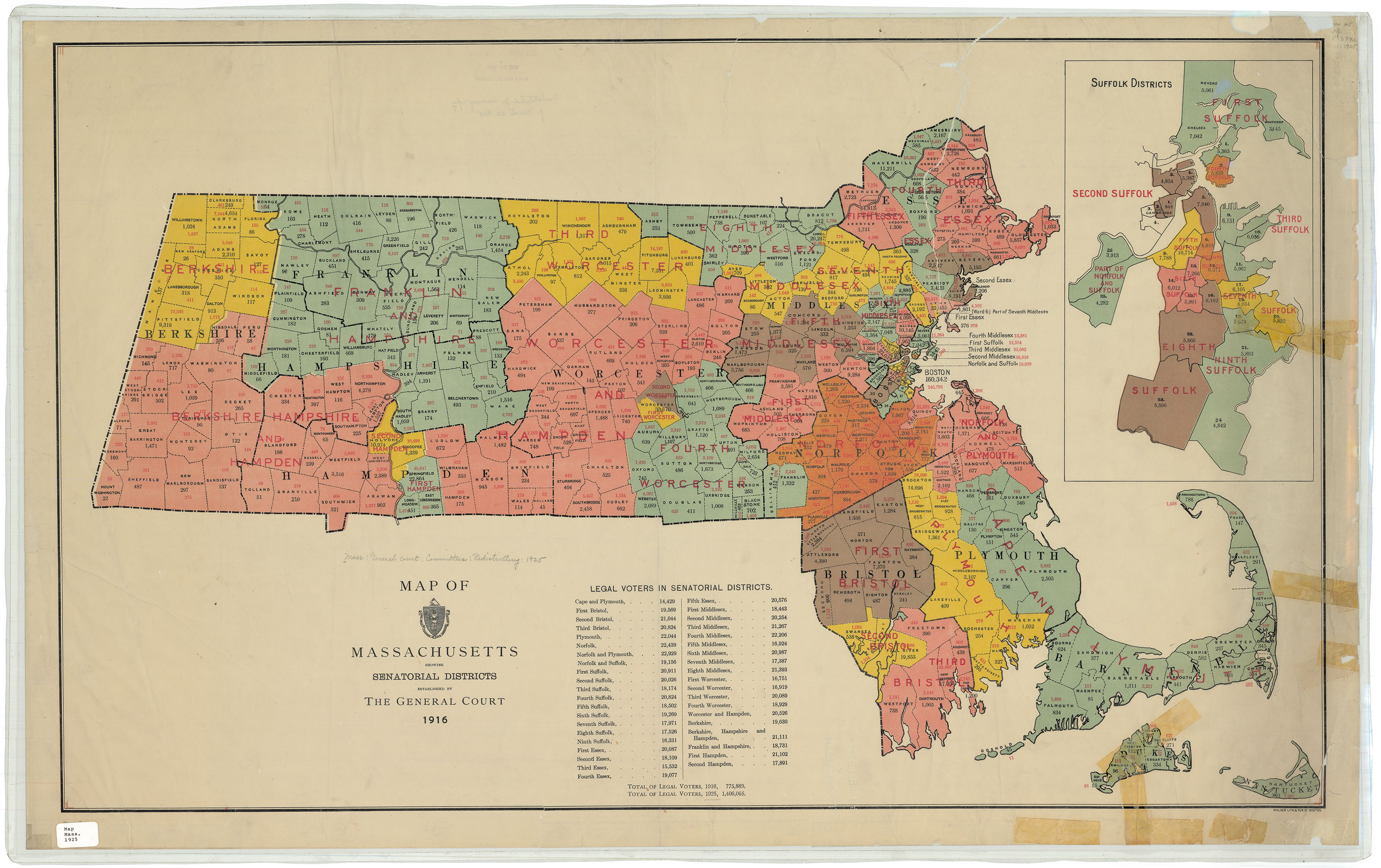
Map of Massachusetts state senate districts apportioned in 1916

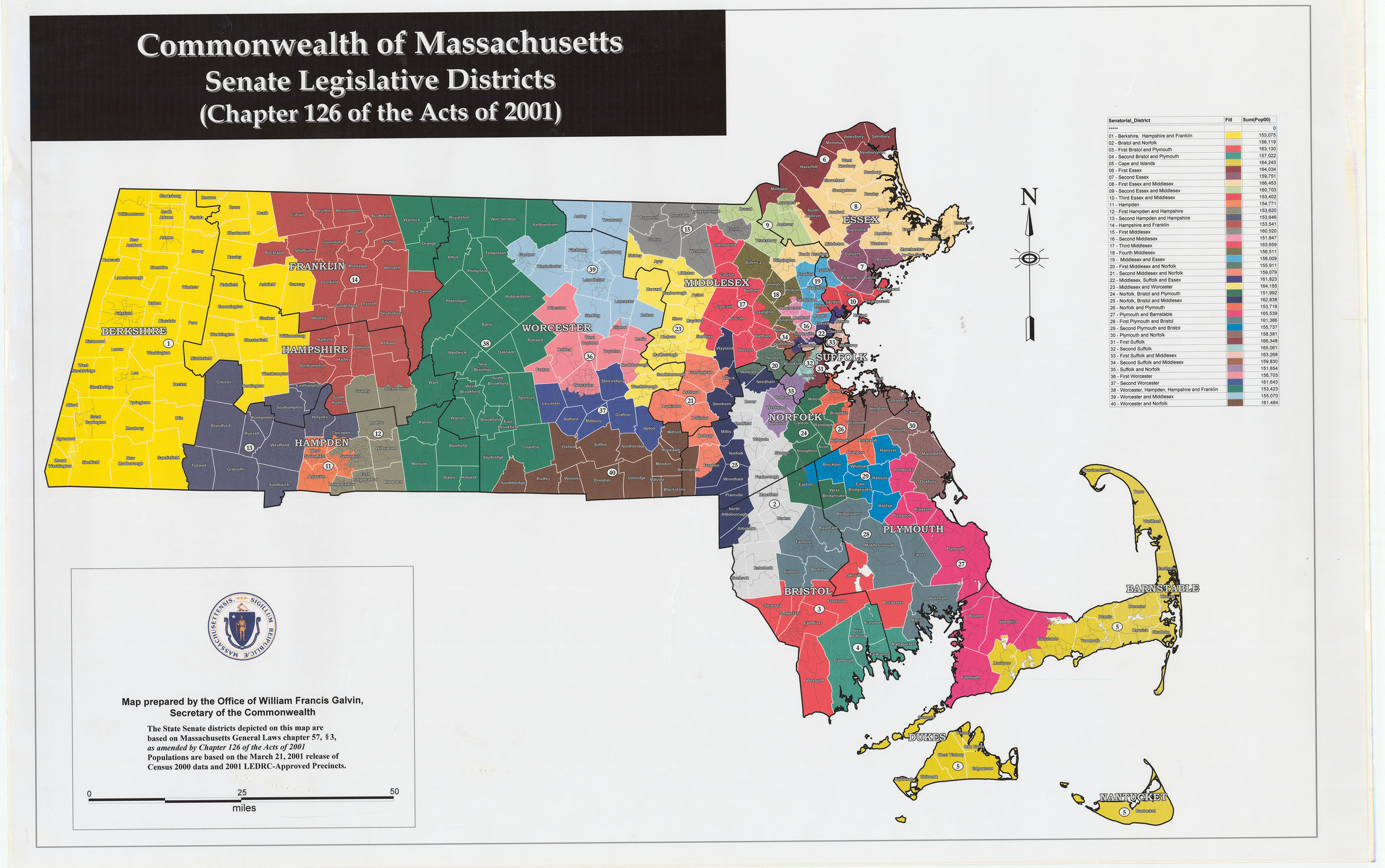
Map of Massachusetts state senate districts, 2001

- 1st Bristol district
- 1st Hampden district
- 1st Hampden and Hampshire district
- 1st Norfolk district
- 1st Plymouth district
- 1st Suffolk and Norfolk district
- 1st Worcester and Middlesex district
- 2nd Bristol district
- 2nd Hampden district
- 2nd Hampden and Hampshire district
- 2nd Norfolk district
- 2nd Plymouth district
- 2nd Suffolk and Norfolk district
- 2nd Worcester and Middlesex district
- 3rd Bristol district
- 3rd Essex and Middlesex district
- 3rd Middlesex and Norfolk district
- 3rd Norfolk district
- 3rd Suffolk district
- 3rd Worcester district
- 4th Essex district
- 4th Suffolk district
- 4th Worcester district
- 5th Essex district
- 5th Suffolk district
- 5th Worcester district
- 6th Essex district
- 6th Middlesex district
- 6th Suffolk district
- 7th Middlesex district
- 7th Suffolk district
- 8th Middlesex district
- 8th Suffolk district
- 9th Suffolk district
- Barnstable County
- Berkshire district
- Berkshire and Hampshire district
- Berkshire, Franklin, Hampden and Hampshire district
- Berkshire, Hampden, Hampshire, and Franklin district
- Berkshire, Hampshire and Franklin district
- Berkshire, Hampshire and Hampden district
- Bristol and Plymouth district
- Cape district
- Cape and Plymouth district
- Central Worcester district
- East Hampden district
- East Norfolk district
- East Worcester district
- Essex County
- Franklin district
- Franklin and Hampshire district
- Hampden and Berkshire district
- Hampden and Hampshire district
- Hampshire district
- Hampshire and Franklin district
- Island district
- Middle Plymouth district
- Middlesex and Essex district
- Middlesex and Norfolk district
- Middlesex County
- Middlesex, Norfolk and Worcester district
- Middlesex, Suffolk and Essex district
- Norfolk district
- Norfolk and Bristol district
- Norfolk and Middlesex district
- Norfolk County
- North Berkshire district
- North Bristol district
- North Norfolk district
- North Plymouth district
- North-East Worcester district
- Plymouth district
- Plymouth County
- South Berkshire district
- South Bristol district
- South Plymouth district
- South-East Worcester district
- South-West Worcester district
- Suffolk and Middlesex district
- Suffolk and Norfolk district
- Suffolk County
- Suffolk, Essex and Middlesex district
- West Bristol district
- West Hampden district
- West Norfolk district
- West Worcester district
- Worcester district
- Worcester and Hampden district
- Worcester and Hampshire district
- Worcester County
- Worcester, Franklin, Hampden and Hampshire district
- Worcester, Hampden and Hampshire district
- Worcester, Hampden, Hampshire and Franklin district

== See also ==
- List of current districts of the Massachusetts Senate
- History of the Massachusetts General Court
- List of Massachusetts General Courts
- List of former districts of the Massachusetts House of Representatives
- Apportionment in US state legislatures
