= Massachusetts House of Representatives' 21st Middlesex district =

American legislative district

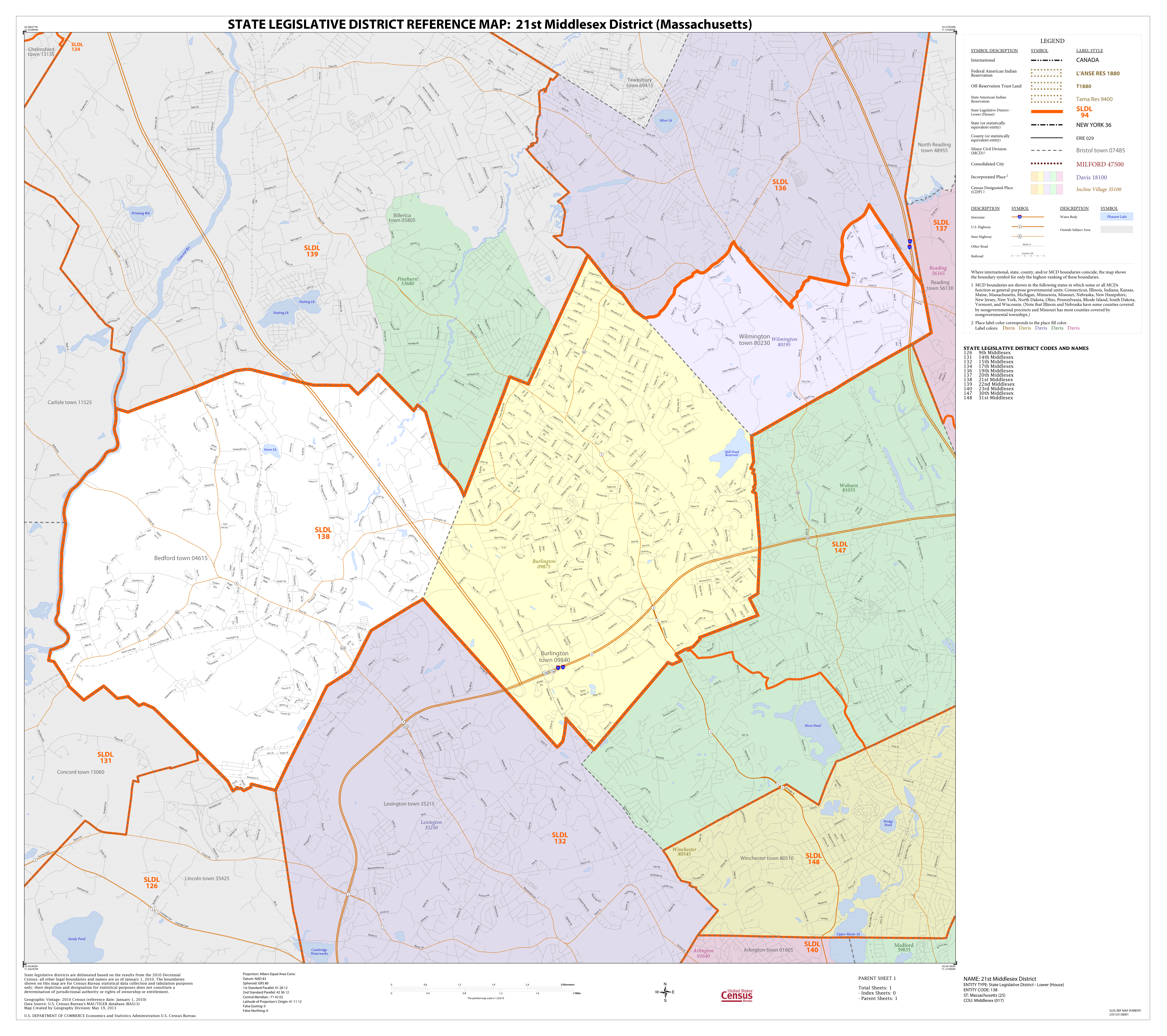
Map of Massachusetts House of Representatives' 21st Middlesex district, based on the 2010 United States census.

Massachusetts House of Representatives' 21st Middlesex district in the United States is one of 160 legislative districts included in the lower house of the Massachusetts General Court. It covers part of Middlesex County. Democrat Ken Gordon of Bedford has represented the district since 2013.

== Towns represented ==
The district includes the following localities:

- Bedford
- Burlington
- part of Wilmington

The current district geographic boundary overlaps with those of the Massachusetts Senate's 1st Essex and Middlesex district, 3rd Middlesex district, and 4th Middlesex district.

=== Former locales ===
The district previously covered:

- Carlisle, circa 1872
- Lexington, circa 1872

== Representatives ==
- Samuel P. Breed, circa 1858
- Stillman E. Parker, circa 1859
- Thomas J. Flynn, circa 1888
- Elbridge Gerry Davis, circa 1920
- Lloyd Makepeace, circa 1920
- George Louis Richards, circa 1920
- Louis Harry Glaser, circa 1951
- Herbert L. Jackson, 1951–1955
- Angelo Marotta, circa 1975
- Robert Krekorian
- Bradley Jones Jr.
- Charles A. Murphy
- Kenneth I. Gordon, 2013–current

== See also ==
- List of Massachusetts House of Representatives elections
- List of Massachusetts General Courts
- List of former districts of the Massachusetts House of Representatives
- Other Middlesex County districts of the Massachusetts House of Representatives: 1st, 2nd, 3rd, 4th, 5th, 6th, 7th, 8th, 9th, 10th, 11th, 12th, 13th, 14th, 15th, 16th, 17th, 18th, 19th, 20th, 22nd, 23rd, 24th, 25th, 26th, 27th, 28th, 29th, 30th, 31st, 32nd, 33rd, 34th, 35th, 36th, 37th

== Images ==
Portraits of legislators

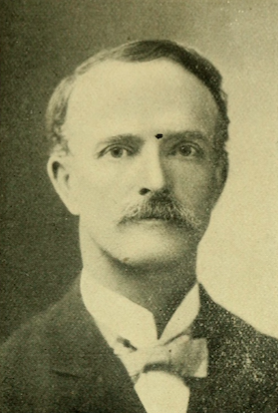
Charles Dean

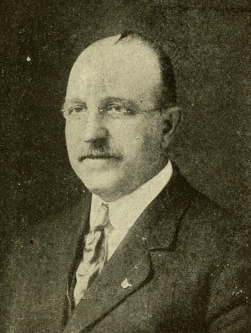
Alvin Bliss

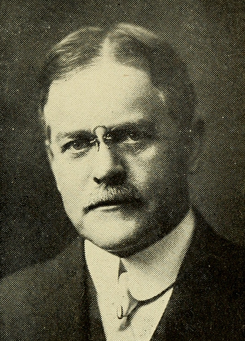
George Richards

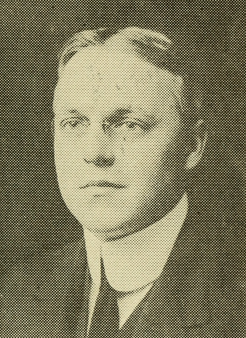
Lloyd Makepeace

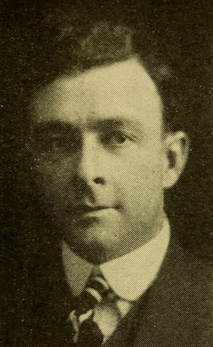
Burt Dewar

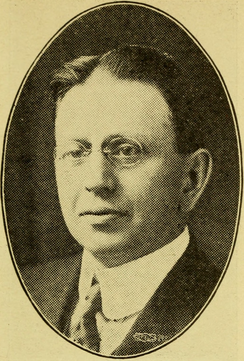
Elbridge Davis

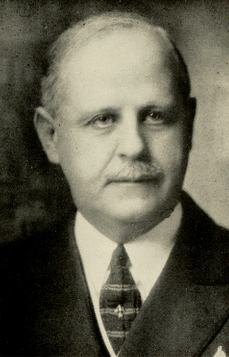
John Kimball

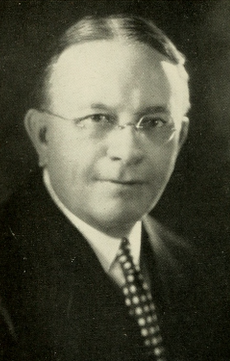
William Hastings

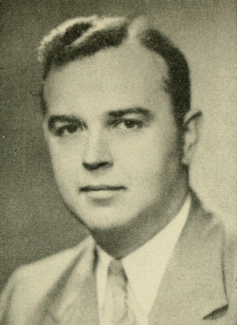
Fred Lamson

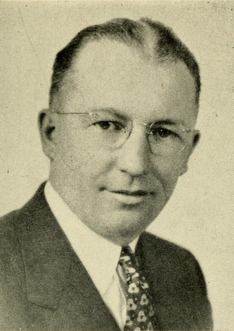
Robert F. Murphy

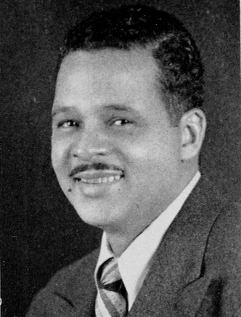
Herbert Loring Jackson, 1951

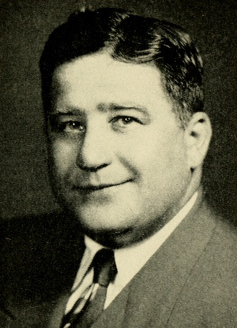
Louis Harry Glaser

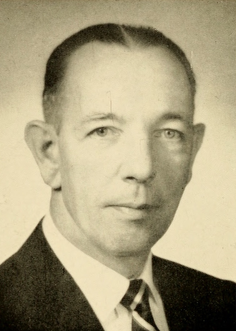
George O'Farrell

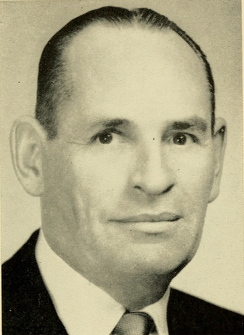
George Walsh

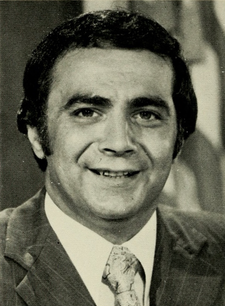
Angelo Marotta

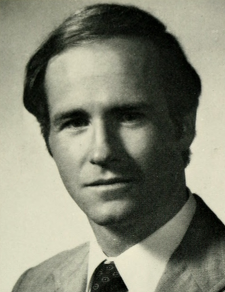
Michael Barrett

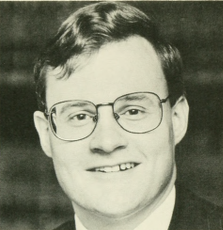
Bradley Jones

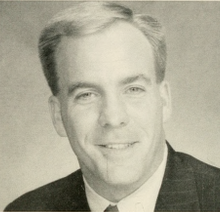
Charles Murphy
