= Massachusetts House of Representatives' 33rd Middlesex district =

American legislative district

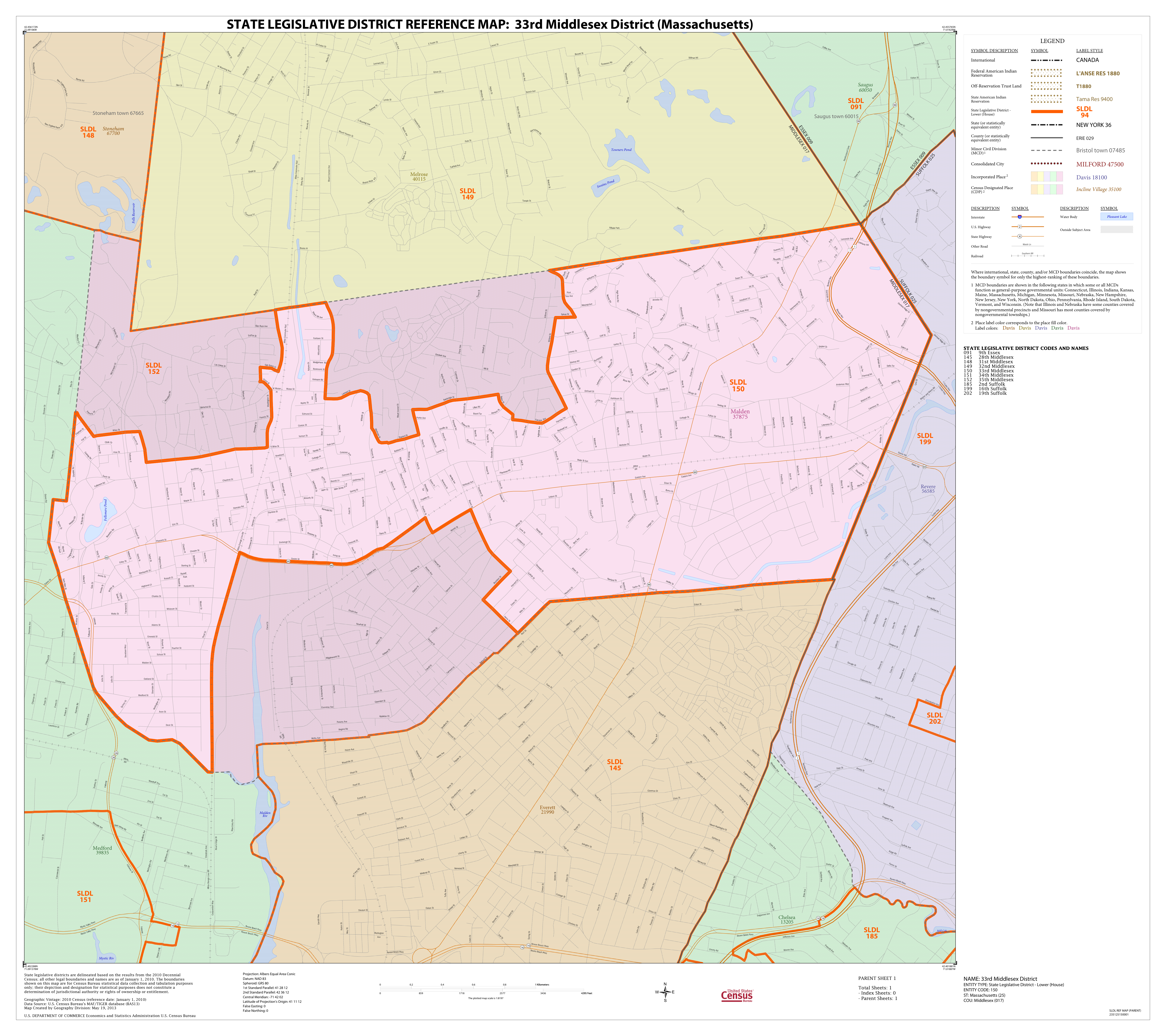
Map of Massachusetts House of Representatives' 33rd Middlesex district, based on the 2010 United States census.

Massachusetts House of Representatives' 33rd Middlesex district in the United States is one of 160 legislative districts included in the lower house of the Massachusetts General Court. It covers part of the city of Malden in Middlesex County. Since 2015, Steven Ultrino of the Democratic Party has represented the district.

The current district geographic boundary overlaps with that of the Massachusetts Senate's 5th Middlesex district.

== Representatives ==
- Nicholas Paleologos
- Carol A. Donovan, 1991–2002
- Christopher G. Fallon
- Steven Ultrino, 2015–current

== See also ==
- List of Massachusetts House of Representatives elections
- List of Massachusetts General Courts
- Other Middlesex County districts of the Massachusetts House of Representatives: 1st, 2nd, 3rd, 4th, 5th, 6th, 7th, 8th, 9th, 10th, 11th, 12th, 13th, 14th, 15th, 16th, 17th, 18th, 19th, 20th, 21st, 22nd, 23rd, 24th, 25th, 26th, 27th, 28th, 29th, 30th, 31st, 32nd, 34th, 35th, 36th, 37th
- List of former districts of the Massachusetts House of Representatives

== Images ==
Portraits of legislators

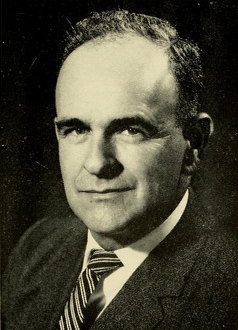
Lincoln Cole

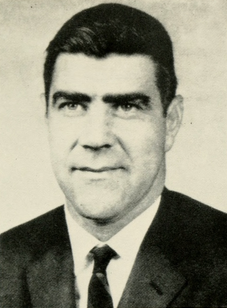
Daniel Joyce

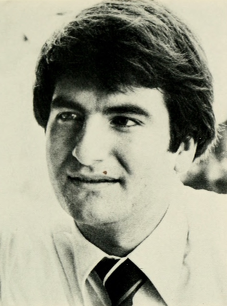
Nicholas Paleologos

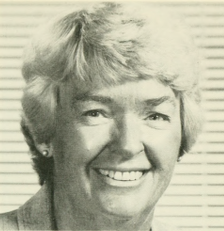
Carol Donovan

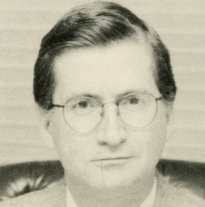
Christopher Fallon
