= Massachusetts House of Representatives' 16th Middlesex district =

American legislative district

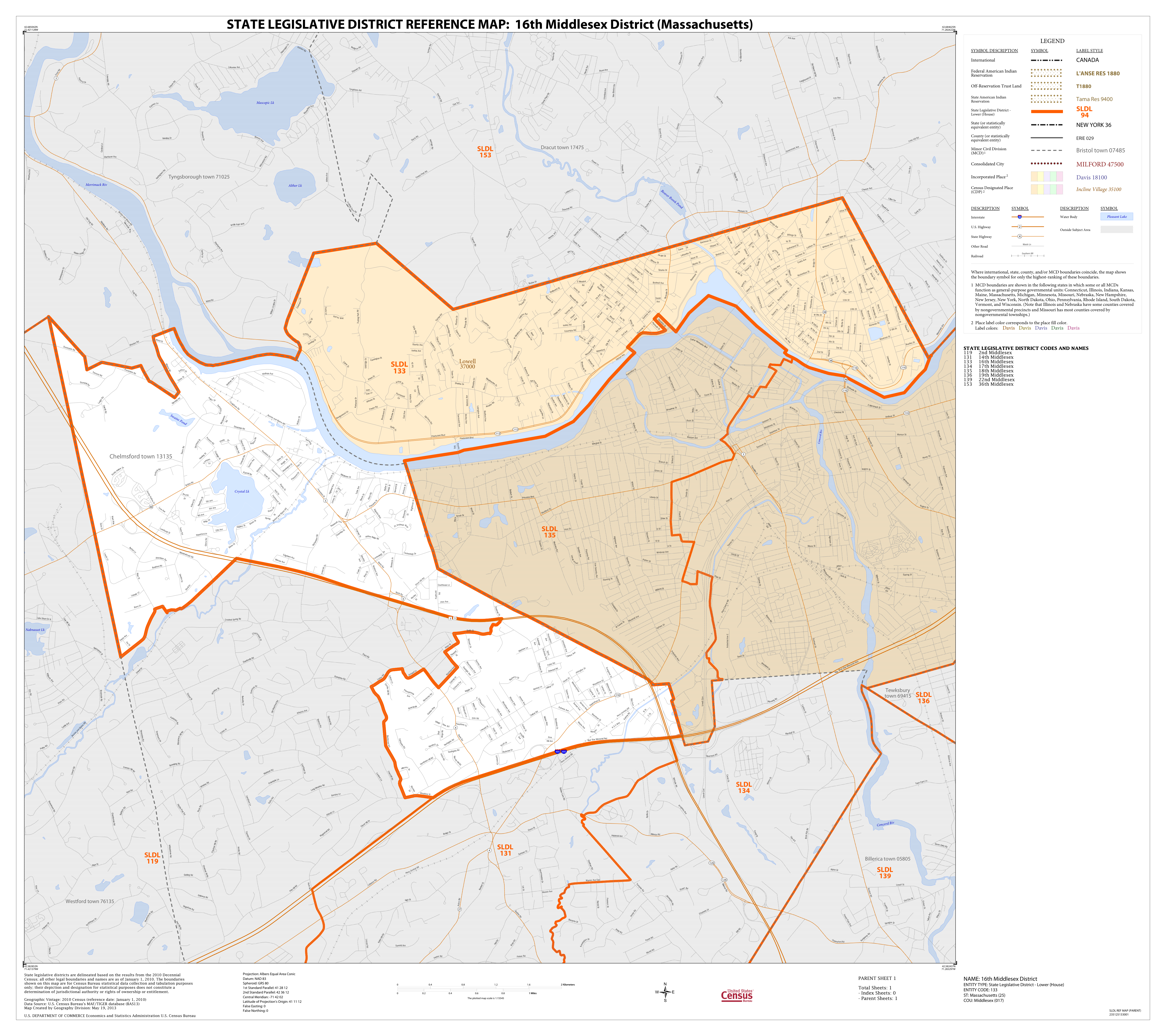
Map of Massachusetts House of Representatives' 16th Middlesex district, based on the 2010 United States census.

Massachusetts House of Representatives' 16th Middlesex district in the United States is one of 160 legislative districts included in the lower house of the Massachusetts General Court. It covers part of Middlesex County. Democrat Rodney Elliot of Lowell has represented the district since 2023.

== Locales represented ==
The district includes the following localities:

- part of Chelmsford
- part of Lowell

The current district geographic boundary overlaps with those of the Massachusetts Senate's 1st Middlesex and 3rd Middlesex districts.

== Former locale ==
The district previously covered Framingham, circa 1872.

== Representatives ==
- Benj. H. Richardson, circa 1858
- Benjamin W. Gleason, circa 1859
- Charles Q. Pierce, circa 1888
- Thomas J. Corbett, 1917–1922
- Robert F. Murphy, circa 1951
- William R. Callahan, 1971-1972
- Edward J. Markey, 1973-1974
- Richard J. McGrath, 1975-1976
- A. Joseph DeNucci, 1977-1978
- Bruce N. Freeman, 1979-1986
- Carol C. Cleven, 1987–1988, 1991-2002
- Henry E. Sultivan, 1989-1990
- Thomas Golden Jr., 2003-2023t
- Rodney Elliot, 2023-current

== See also ==
- List of Massachusetts House of Representatives elections
- List of Massachusetts General Courts
- List of former districts of the Massachusetts House of Representatives
- Other Middlesex County districts of the Massachusetts House of Representatives: 1st, 2nd, 3rd, 4th, 5th, 6th, 7th, 8th, 9th, 10th, 11th, 12th, 13th, 14th, 15th, 17th, 18th, 19th, 20th, 21st, 22nd, 23rd, 24th, 25th, 26th, 27th, 28th, 29th, 30th, 31st, 32nd, 33rd, 34th, 35th, 36th, 37th

== Images ==
Portraits of legislators

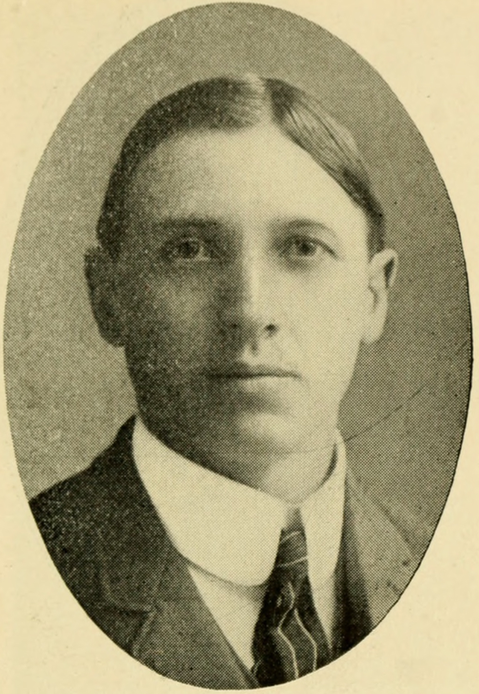
Martin Conley

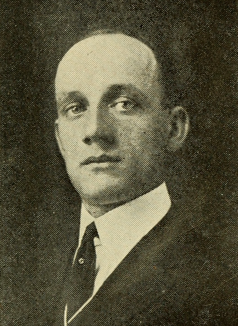
Thomas Corbett

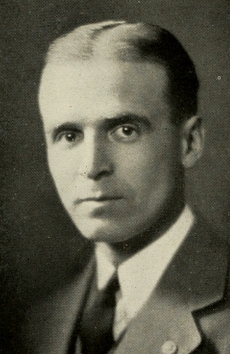
Albert Bourgeois

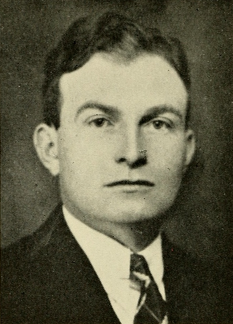
Bartholomew Callery

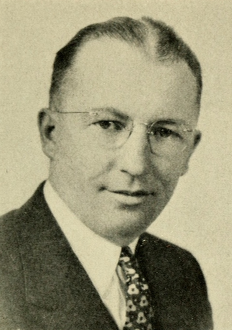
Robert Murphy

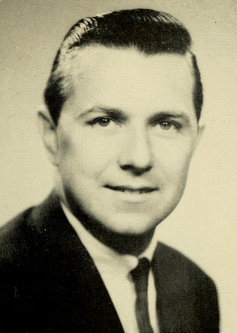
Edward Flanagan

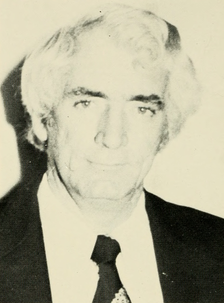
Richard J. McGrath

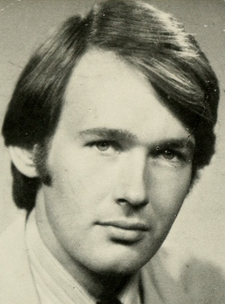
Edward Markey

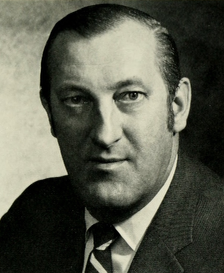
Bruce Freeman

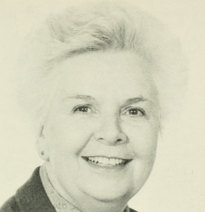
Carol Cleven

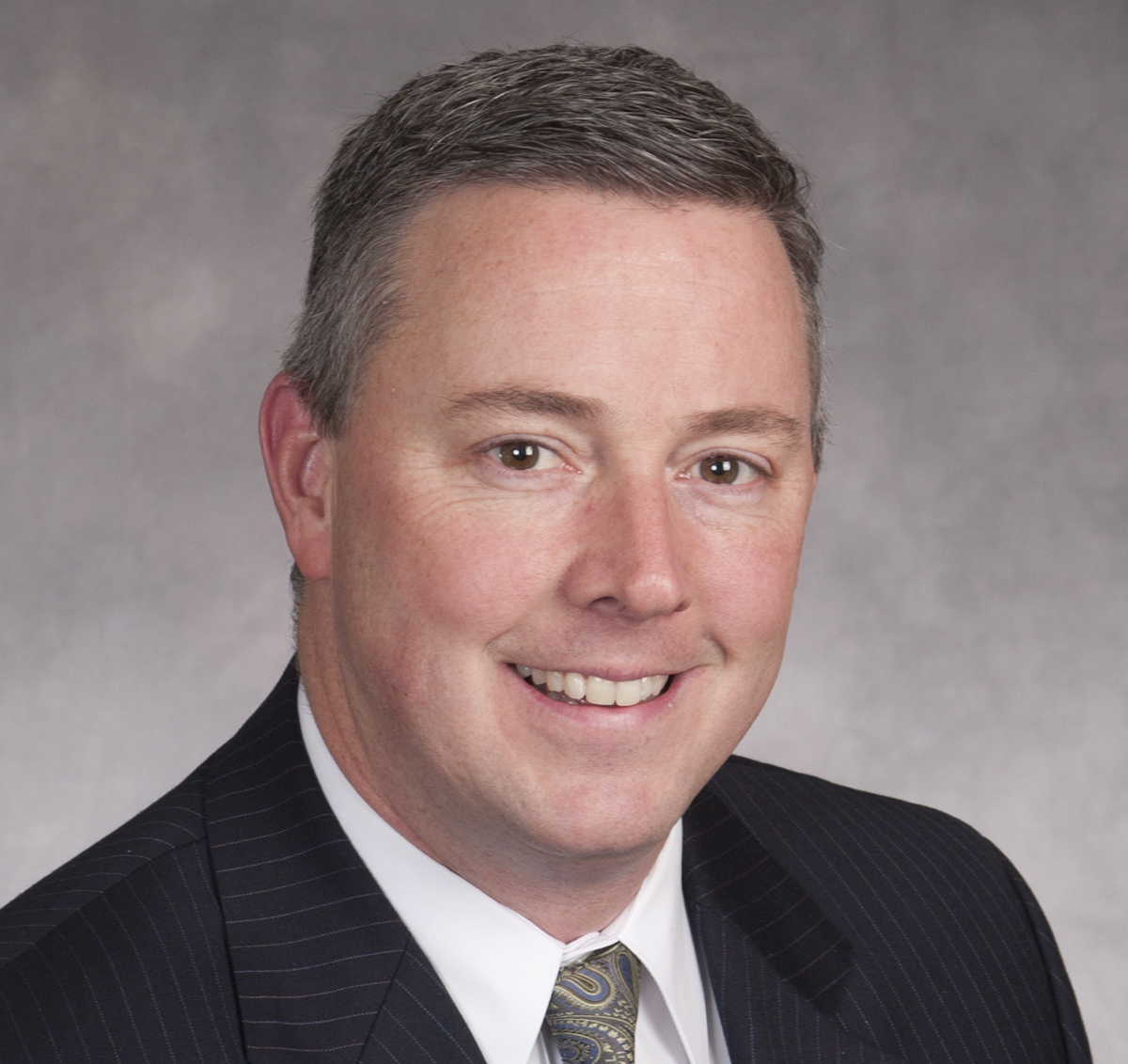
Tom Golden

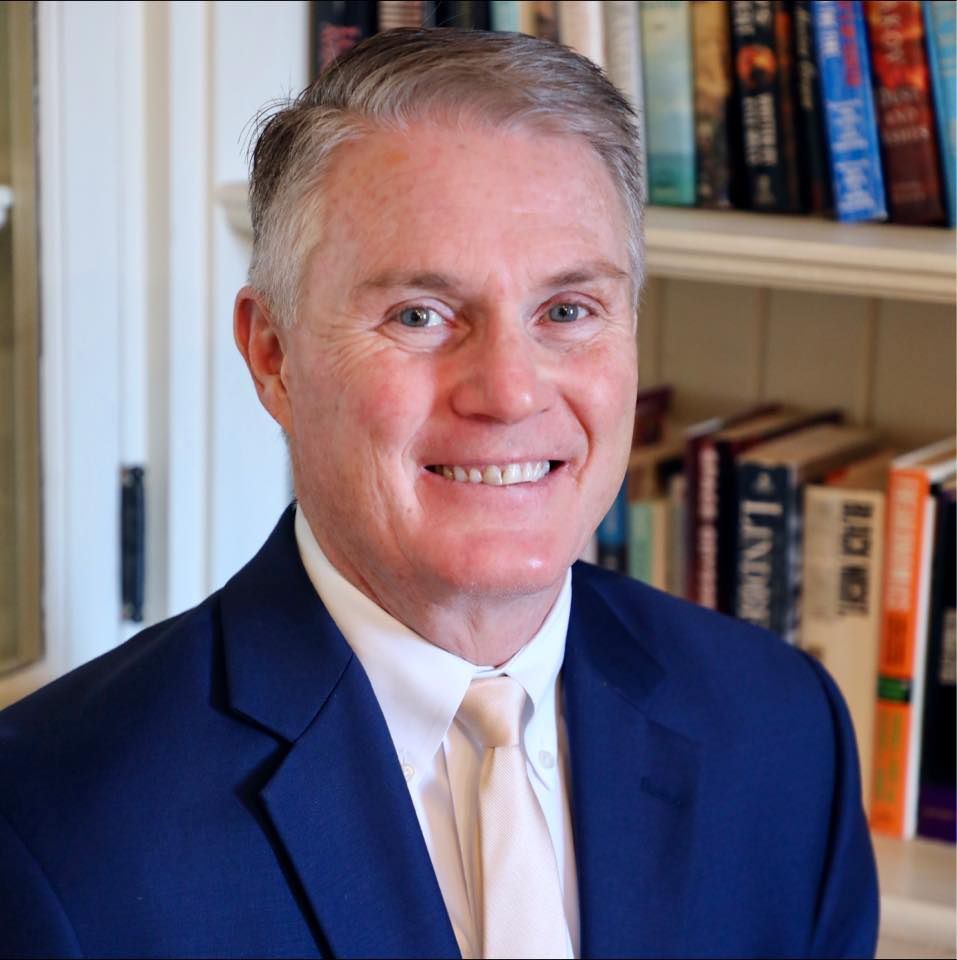
Rodney Elliot
