= Christopher Fallon =

American politician (born 1952)

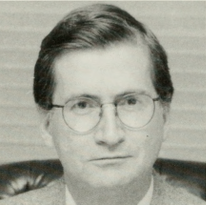

Member of the Massachusetts House of Representatives from the 33rd Middlesex District
- In office 2003 – January 7, 2015
- Preceded by: Carol A. Donovan
- Succeeded by: Steven Ultrino

Member of the Massachusetts House of Representatives from the 36th Middlesex District
- In office 1997–2003
- Preceded by: James DiPaola
- Succeeded by: Colleen Garry

Personal details
- Born: June 7, 1953 (age 73) Malden, Massachusetts
- Party: Democratic
- Relatives: Thomas H. Fallon (brother)
- Education: Merrimack College; University of Lowell; Suffolk University Law School
- Occupation: Attorney; Politician

Christopher G. Fallon (born June 7, 1952, in Malden, Massachusetts) is an American politician who represented the 33rd Middlesex District in the Massachusetts House of Representatives from 2003 to 2015 and was a member of the Malden School Committee from 1989 to 1997. He declined to seek re-election in 2014 and was succeeded by Steven Ultrino.

== Early life and education ==
Fallon was born in Malden, Massachusetts on June 7, 1953. He graduated with a B.S. from Merrimack College, an M.S. from the University of Lowell and subsequently obtained a J.D. from Suffolk University Law School.
