= United States House Select Committee on Energy Independence and Global Warming =

Congressional committee on climate change and action

The House Select Committee on Energy Independence and Global Warming was a select committee of the United States House of Representatives. It was established March 8, 2007 through adoption of a resolution by a 269–150 vote of the full House.

The committee existed from 2007 to 2011, and was not renewed when the Republicans gained control of the House for the 112th Congress.

In 2019, the new Democratic majority established a successor committee, the United States House Select Committee on the Climate Crisis.

== History ==
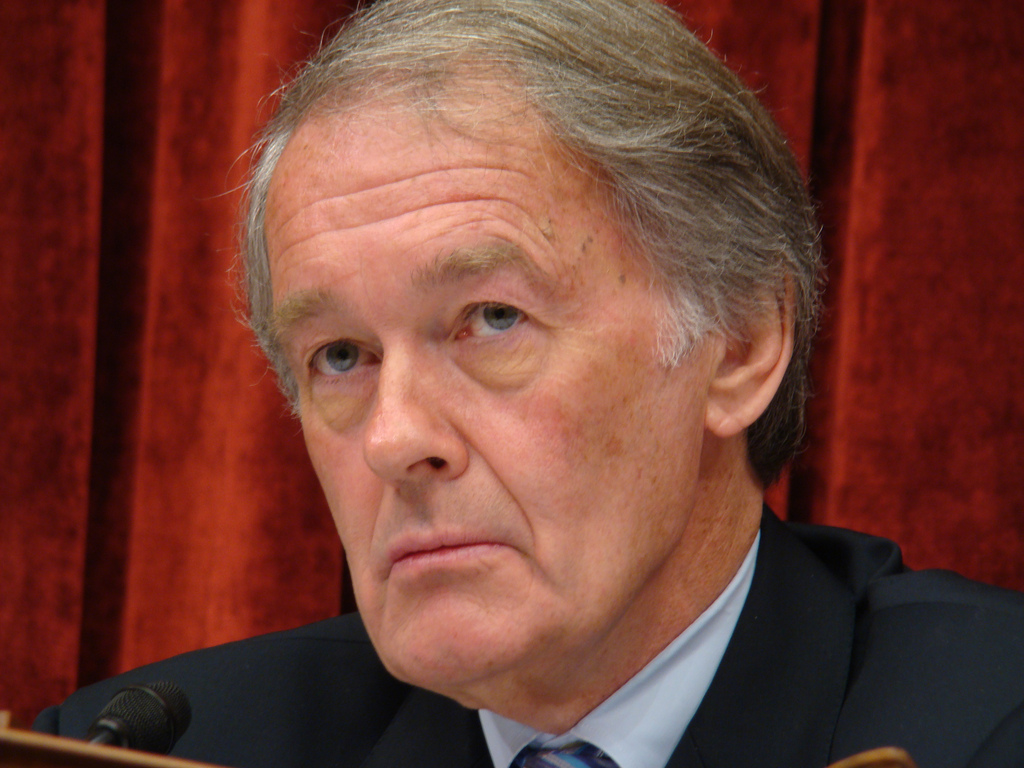
Representative Ed Markey, Democrat of Massachusetts, was chairman of the Select Committee on Energy Independence and Global Warming. He is pictured here presiding over the committee at a hearing on June 15, 2010.

Democratic Speaker Nancy Pelosi announced plans to create the select committee on January 18, 2007, soon after Democrats took control of the House following the 2006 elections.

The creation of the committee was criticized by House Republicans, who argued "that the committee was unnecessary or that its budget could be used better by the ethics committee." The proposal to create the committee also encountered some skepticism from House Democrats, particularly Chairman John Dingell of the powerful Energy and Commerce Committee (which has primary jurisdiction over environmental and climate change issues) and Chairman Charles Rangel of the Ways and Means Committee (which has jurisdiction on any tax legislation aimed at affecting industry behavior). Ultimately, Pelosi was able to reach a compromise with Dingell, wherein the committee was to be advisory in nature, without the legislative authority granted to standing committees. Joe Barton, the ranking Republican member of the House Energy and Commerce Committee, continued to object to the committee's existence, calling it a "platform for some members to grandstand."

The committee held 80 hearings and briefings, on topics ranging from climate science to the Deepwater Horizon explosion and subsequent oil spill.

The committee played a role in the creation of the 2007 energy act and the 2009 stimulus act (which included US$90 billion in spending on green energy and energy efficiency). Most prominently, the committee played a major role in shaping the 2009 climate bill—the American Clean Energy and Security Act or "Waxman-Markey"—which was passed by the House but never became law due to the Senate's refusal to take up the bill.

After Republicans won control of the House in the 2010 election, the new Republican majority in the House (led by the new speaker, John Boehner of Ohio) decided to kill the committee, resulting in criticism from environmentalists and climate researchers.

== Jurisdiction ==
The Select Committee on Energy Independence and Global Warming conducted hearings on energy independence and climate change issues. The committee lacked the authority to draft legislation, but worked with the House standing committees with jurisdiction over climate change issues and developed recommendations on legislative proposals. Speaker Pelosi indicated she would have liked committees with jurisdiction over energy, environment and technology policy to report legislation on these issues to the full House by July 4, 2007.

== Members, 111th Congress ==
The select committee was reestablished for the 111th Congress pursuant to H.Res. 5. On January 14, 2009, Speaker Nancy Pelosi reappointed Ed Markey of Massachusetts and James Sensenbrenner of Wisconsin as Chairman and Ranking Member, respectively, of the committee.

| Majority | Minority |
|---|---|
| Ed Markey, Massachusetts, Chair; Earl Blumenauer, Oregon; Jay Inslee, Washington; John Larson, Connecticut; Stephanie Herseth Sandlin, South Dakota; Emanuel Cleaver, Missouri; John Hall, New York; John Salazar, Colorado; Jackie Speier, California | James Sensenbrenner, Wisconsin, Ranking Member; John Shadegg, Arizona; Candice Miller, Michigan; John Sullivan, Oklahoma; Marsha Blackburn, Tennessee; Shelley Moore Capito, West Virginia |

== See also ==
- Climate change mitigation
- Climate change policy of the United States
- Effects of global warming
- Efficient energy use
- Global warming
- Energy resilience
- U.S. Climate Change Science Program
