= Nicholas Paleologos =

American politician (born 1953)

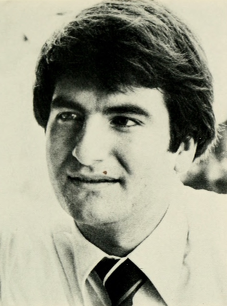

Member of the Massachusetts House of Representatives from the 33rd Middlesex District
- In office 1977–1991
- Preceded by: Daniel L. Joyce Jr.
- Succeeded by: Carol A. Donovan

Personal details
- Born: March 9, 1953 (age 73) Winchester, Massachusetts
- Party: Democratic
- Spouse: Patricia Worth
- Education: Tufts University; Harvard University
- Occupation: Public Official; Film, television and theatrical producer

Nicholas "Nick" A. Paleologos (born March 9, 1953, in Winchester, Massachusetts) is an American public official, politician, and theater and film producer who currently serves as Executive Director of the Berkshire Theatre Group.

== Politics ==
Paleologos was a member of the Woburn School Committee from 1974 to 1975 and represented the 33rd Middlesex district in the Massachusetts House of Representatives from 1977 to 1991. He was a candidate for Lieutenant Governor of Massachusetts in 1990, but lost in the Democratic primary.

== Film and theater production ==
A two-time Tony Award winning producer, Paleologos was also the recipient of a prime time Emmy Award nomination for the HBO film In the Gloaming. His last production on Broadway was Chitty Chitty Bang Bang. Feature films he co-produced include Ghosts of Mississippi, Lansky, Little Fugitive, and Hurlyburly.

== Massachusetts Film Office ==
Paleologos was the executive director of the Massachusetts Film Office from 2007 until the position was eliminated on January 1, 2011. During his tenure at the film office, the movie-making industry in the Commonwealth experienced unprecedented growth. He was responsible for bringing several major motion pictures to shoot in Massachusetts including The Town, Shutter Island, The Social Network, Knight and Day, The Fighter, Edge of Darkness, The Proposal, and The Company Men. In addition, Quixote Studios opened a $1.5 million operation in Boston.

== New Jersey State Council on the Arts ==
Paleologos was appointed Executive Director of the New Jersey State Council on the Arts in 2011. During his tenure in New Jersey he was awarded the Medal of Excellence by Rowan University where he delivered the Commencement Address to the 2016 graduating Class in the Colleges of Communication, Creative and Performing Arts. He served in that position until 2018.

== Berkshire Theatre Group ==
In 2018, Paleologos was appointed Executive Director of the Berkshire Theatre Group which is the parent organization of two storied American theater institutions: The Berkshire Theatre Festival (est. 1928), and The Colonial Theatre (est. 1903).

== Author ==
Paleologos is a contributor to National Public Radio in Boston where he has written several articles on a variety of subjects including education, the arts, media, politics and the economy. He also won Best Feature Screenplay honors for his script THE STORY OF TELEVISION in Harvardwood's 2014 Writers Competition.
