= Bradley Jones Jr. =

American politician

Brad Jones
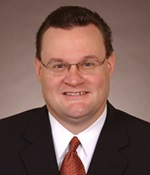

Minority Leader of the Massachusetts House of Representatives
- Incumbent
- Assumed office November 21, 2002; Acting: November 21, 2002 – January 2003
- Preceded by: Francis L. Marini

Member of the Massachusetts House of Representatives
- Incumbent
- Assumed office January 1, 1995
- Preceded by: Robert Krekorian (21st); Jim Miceli (20th)
- Succeeded by: Charles A. Murphy (21st)
- Constituency: 21st Middlesex (1994–2003); 20th Middlesex (2003–present)

Personal details
- Born: January 9, 1965 (age 61) North Reading, Massachusetts, U.S.
- Party: Republican
- Spouse: Linda Jones
- Education: Johns Hopkins University (attended); Harvard University (ALB)

Bradley H. Jones Jr. (born January 9, 1965) is a Republican member of the Massachusetts House of Representatives since January 1995. He has also been the minority leader of the House since 2003. Jones represents the 20th Middlesex district, which includes Lynnfield, parts of Middleton, North Reading and parts of Reading.

== Early life and career ==
Jones grew up in North Reading going to North Reading High School, later attending Johns Hopkins University and the Extension School at Harvard University. Jones was first elected to the North Reading Republican Town Committee in 1988 where he still serves. He was later elected to the North Reading Board of Selectmen where he served from 1993 to 1999. Jones also has served on the North Reading Finance Committee (1992–1993, 1999–present) and the North Reading Housing Authority (1988–1992).

He started his career in the Massachusetts House of Representatives in 1995 and was elected to his first leadership position in 2001 as the Assistant Minority Leader. Then in 2003 he ascended to the position of Minority Leader and has served in that position since.

Organizations that Jones is a part of include Eastern Middlesex Services, where he was a former member of the Board of Directors, and the American Legislative Exchange Council (ALEC).

Jones lives with his wife Linda and their two children in North Reading.

== 2009 leadership contest ==
In November 2008, Rep. Lew Evangilidis announced that he planned to challenge Jones for House Minority Leader, the top Republican post in the Massachusetts House of Representatives. In the January 2009 leadership vote, Evangelidis lost the contest to incumbent Jones by two votes, 9 to 7.

== Committee Assignments ==
For the 2025–26 Session, Jones sits on the following committees in the House:

- Ranking Minority, Joint Committee on Telecommunications, Utilities and Energy

== Task Forces and Commissions ==
Jones is involved in the following task forces and commissions:

- Special Legislative Commission on Load Growth Due to AI and Data Centers
- Special Task Force on Internet Use by Sex Offenders
- Special Commission on Lab Shopping in the Cannabis Industry
- Commission to Study Financial Ties Between MA Entities and Chinese-Owned Companies
- Task Force on State Mandate in Public Schools

Massachusetts House of Representatives
Preceded by Robert Krekorian	Member of the Massachusetts House of Representatives from the 21st Middlesex district 1994–2003	Succeeded by Charles A. Murphy
Preceded by Jim Miceli	Member of the Massachusetts House of Representatives from the 20th Middlesex district 2003–present	Incumbent
Preceded by Francis L. Marini	Minority Leader of the Massachusetts House of Representatives; 2002–present	Incumbent
