= Richard Haggerty =

Massachusetts politician

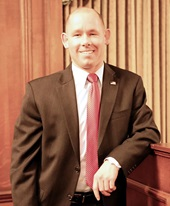

Member of the Massachusetts House of Representatives from the 30th Middlesex district
- Incumbent
- Assumed office January 2, 2019
- Preceded by: James J. Dwyer

Personal details
- Party: Democratic
- Spouse: Haley
- Education: University of New Hampshire

Richard M. Haggerty is an American politician. He represents the 30th Middlesex District in the Massachusetts House of Representatives, representing the towns of Woburn and Reading.

Haggerty serves as the chair of the Joint Committee on Housing, and has served on a handful of committees related to financial, economic, and the climate. He previously served as the Woburn City Council President from 2014 to 2019, and as alderman at-large from 2010 to 2019.

Richard also serves on the board of the Woburn Friends of VNA, is a board member of the Middlesex County Child Sexual Abuse Prevention Partnership, and is an active member of the Woburn Elks and the Woburn Historical Society.

== Committee Assignments ==
For the 2025-26 Session, Haggerty sits on the following committees in the House:

- Chairperson, Joint Committee on Housing

== Personal life ==
Haggerty is the great-grandson of J.D. Haggerty, who founded the Woburn Daily Times in 1901, and the grandson of Edward Costello a career firefighter from Medford, MA.

He received his Bachelor’s Degree from the University of New Hampshire in Political Science with a special concentration in Foreign Policy. He graduated from Woburn High School.
