= James J. Dwyer =

American politician

Member of the Massachusetts House of Representatives from the 30th Middlesex district
- In office 2009–2019
- Preceded by: Patrick Natale
- Succeeded by: Richard Haggerty

Personal details
- Party: Democratic
- Education: Norwich University; Anna Maria College
- Occupation: Probation Officer; Politician

James J. Dwyer is an American politician who represents the 30th Middlesex District in the Massachusetts House of Representatives. He was a member of the Woburn Housing Authority from 2000 to 2004 and the Woburn City Council from 2006 to 2009.

From 1975 to 2007, Dwyer worked for the Massachusetts Probation Department as a juvenile probation officer in the Middlesex Juvenile Court.
