= Carol A. Donovan =

American politician (born 1937)

Carol Donovan
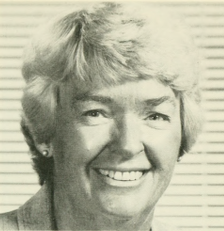

Member of the Massachusetts House of Representatives from the 30th Middlesex District
- In office 2003–2005
- Preceded by: Patricia D. Jehlen
- Succeeded by: Patrick Natale

Member of the Massachusetts House of Representatives from the 33rd Middlesex District
- In office 1991–2003
- Preceded by: Nicholas Paleologos
- Succeeded by: Christopher Fallon

Personal details
- Born: June 5, 1937 (age 89) Lynn, Massachusetts
- Party: Democratic
- Education: Regis College; Northeastern University
- Occupation: Educator; Politician

Carol A. Donovan (born June 5, 1937, in Lynn, Massachusetts) is an American politician who was a member of the Massachusetts House of Representatives from 1991 to 2005.

== See also ==
- 1991–1992 Massachusetts legislature
- 1993–1994 Massachusetts legislature
- 1995–1996 Massachusetts legislature
- 1997–1998 Massachusetts legislature
- 1999–2000 Massachusetts legislature
- 2001–2002 Massachusetts legislature
- 2003–2004 Massachusetts legislature
