= Ken Gordon (Massachusetts politician) =

American politician

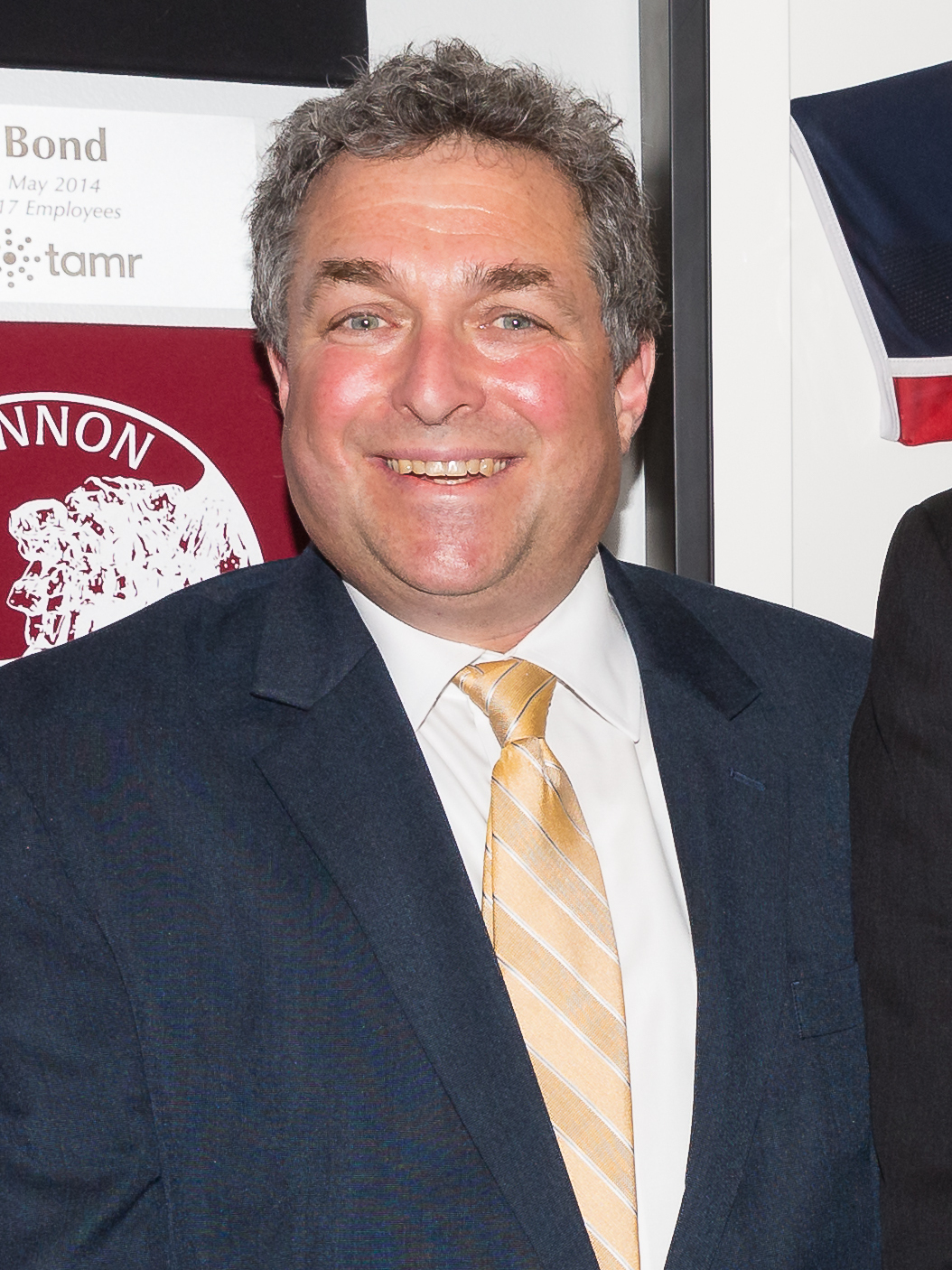

Member of the Massachusetts House of Representatives from the 21st Middlesex District
- Incumbent
- Assumed office 2013
- Preceded by: Charles A. Murphy

Personal details
- Born: November 4, 1959 (age 66)
- Party: Democratic
- Spouse: Breena Daniell
- Children: 1
- Education: Northeastern University; Suffolk University Law School (JD)
- Occupation: Attorney

Kenneth I. Gordon (born November 4, 1959) is an American attorney and state legislator representing the 21st Middlesex District in the Massachusetts House of Representatives. The district includes Burlington, Bedford, and Wilmington's Precinct 3. He is a Bedford resident and a member of the Democratic Party.

== Education and career ==
Gordon graduated from Ledyard High school in 1977 before going on to attend Northeastern University. After graduating from Northeastern with a degree in journalism, he worked as a sports writer and editor affiliated with The Boston Globe, The Palm Beach Post and Evening Times, and The Sporting News magazine.

Gordon attained his JD cum laude at Suffolk University Law School. After working at various law firms, he chose to open Gordon Law Office, LLC in 2000 where he specializes in workplace discrimination and harassment and commercial or corporate disputes among and within businesses. He is a former member of the Massachusetts Employment Lawyers Association and National Employment Lawyers Association.

== Massachusetts House of Representatives ==
Gordon was elected to serve in the Massachusetts House of Representatives in 2012. As a representative, Gordon is the House Chair of the Joint Committee on Public Service. Gordon was previously the Vice Chair of the Joint Committee on Election Laws, the Vice Chair of the Joint Committee on Economic Development and Emerging Technologies and also served as a member of the Joint Committee on Transportation, the Joint Committee on Community Development and Small Businesses, and the House Committee on Bonding, Capital Expenditures and State Assets. In 2018, the Massachusetts legislature used the principles of a bill he filed to create a Paid Family and Medical Leave program, which was signed into law as part of a "Grand Bargain" bill.

== Personal ==
Gordon lives in Bedford with his wife, Breena Daniell, and their son, Brandon. In Bedford, he served as vice-chair of the Zoning Board, and is past chair of the Bedford Cultural Council. Gordon was a long time volunteer for Bedford's All Night Graduation Party.

He hosts Rappin' with the Rep, a monthly cable access show on Burlington Community Access Television.

== See also ==
- 2019–2020 Massachusetts legislature
- 2021–2022 Massachusetts legislature
