= Charles A. Murphy =

American politician (born 1965)

Charles Murphy

Assistant Majority Leader of the Massachusetts House of Representatives
- In office January 28, 2011 – December 6, 2011
- Succeeded by: Byron Rushing

Chair of the Ways and Means Committee of the Massachusetts House of Representatives
- In office February 12, 2009 – January 28, 2011
- Preceded by: Bob DeLeo
- Succeeded by: Brian Dempsey

Member of the Massachusetts House of Representatives from the 21st Middlesex district
- In office 2003 – January 4, 2013
- Preceded by: Bradley Jones Jr.
- Succeeded by: Ken Gordon

Member of the Massachusetts House of Representatives from the 23rd Middlesex district
- In office 1997–2003
- Preceded by: Marianne Brenton
- Succeeded by: J. James Marzilli Jr.

Personal details
- Born: August 11, 1965 (age 61) Burlington, Massachusetts
- Party: Democratic
- Education: Villanova University; Vermont Law School; Harvard University
- Occupation: Attorney
- Website: charleymurphy.org

Middlesex County

Charles A. "Charley" Murphy (born August 11, 1965) is the former representative of the 21st Middlesex District to the Massachusetts House of Representatives and the Chairman of the Massachusetts House Committee on Ways and Means.

== Biography ==
Murphy was born on August 11, 1965 in Boston and raised in Burlington, Massachusetts. After graduating from the Burlington school system, Murphy went on to attend Villanova University and Vermont Law School.

As a second-year law student at Vermont Law School, Murphy joined the U.S/ Marine Corps, where he served from 1989 to 1994 and rose to the rank of captain. Stationed in Cherry Point, North Carolina, Murphy served a six-month tour as a Staff Judge Advocate for the commanding officer aboard the USS Guadalcanal that deployed to the Mediterranean Sea and Mogadishu, Somalia, as part of the 22nd Marine Expeditionary Unit. During his time in North Carolina, Murphy also served as a military prosecutor and Special Assistant United States Attorney for the Eastern District of North Carolina. He returned to New England following his military service and attended Harvard Kennedy School at Harvard University, graduating with an MPA.

== Political career ==
Murphy was elected to the Massachusetts House of Representatives in 1997 and was serving his sixth term. He represents the 21st Middlesex District, covering Burlington, Bedford, and Precinct 3 of Wilmington. In February 2009, Murphy was appointed Chairman of the House Committee on Ways and Means, which is responsible for considering all legislation affecting the finances of the Commonwealth. Murphy has also served as Vice Chair of the Joint Committee on Bonding, Capital Expenditures and State Assets, Vice Chair of the Judiciary Committee and was a member of both the Joint Committee on Consumer Protection and Professional Licensure and the Veterans Affairs Committees. A veteran himself, Murphy has sponsored and led the passage of legislation to provide tuition assistance and workforce training programs for veterans across Massachusetts. He has helped increase state aid to his district by 90% since he was elected. Murphy also played a key role in constructing the 2009 state budget, which contained historical increases for Chapter 70 education funding.

In 2003, Murphy was named “One of the Top 100 Democrats to Watch” by the Democratic Leadership Council, largely in recognition of his efforts to strengthen public safety policies and ensure equality in the state’s judicial system. Murphy was also named “Outstanding Legislator of the Year” by the Massachusetts Legal Assistance Corporation and Southern Middlesex Legal Services.

In 2007, Murphy was a candidate for the 4th Middlesex district State Senate seat vacated by Robert Havern III. During the campaign, Murphy got into an argument in the House chamber with opponent and fellow Representative Patrick Natale.

== Notes ==
1.Sometimes erroneously referred to as Majority Whip.
