= Carol C. Cleven =

American politician

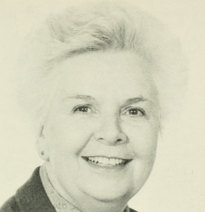

Member of the Massachusetts House of Representatives from the 16th Middlesex district
- In office 1987–2002

Carol C. Cleven (November 2, 1928 – March 12, 2015) was an American Republican politician from Chelmsford, Massachusetts. She represented the 16th Middlesex district in the Massachusetts House of Representatives from 1987 to 2002.

== See also ==
- 1987-1988 Massachusetts legislature
- 1989-1990 Massachusetts legislature
- 1991-1992 Massachusetts legislature
- 1993-1994 Massachusetts legislature
- 1995-1996 Massachusetts legislature
- 1997-1998 Massachusetts legislature
- 1999-2000 Massachusetts legislature
- 2001-2002 Massachusetts legislature
