= Patrick Natale =

American politician

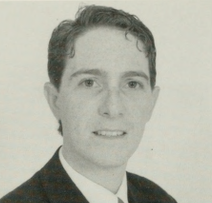

Member of the Massachusetts House of Representatives from the 30th Middlesex district
- In office 2005–2009
- Preceded by: Carol A. Donovan
- Succeeded by: James J. Dwyer

Personal details
- Born: September 22, 1968 (age 58) Woburn, Massachusetts
- Party: Democratic
- Education: Middlesex Community College; Boston University School of Management; Massachusetts School of Law; Boston University School of Law
- Occupation: Carpenter; Attorney; Politician

Patrick Michael Natale is an American politician who was a member of the Massachusetts House of Representatives.

== Early life and education ==
Natale was born on September 22, 1968, in Woburn to John Natale, the health director for the city of Medford, and Eileen Natale. He was one of five children. Natale attend public school in Woburn before enrolling in the Northeast Metropolitan Regional Vocational High School.

He worked as a carpenter for five years before beginning higher education at Middlesex Community College, where he earned Associate degrees in Liberal Arts and Business Administration in 1995. He then went on to earn a Bachelor of Science degree from the Boston University School of Management in Business Administration in 1997, a Juris Doctor degree from the Massachusetts School of Law in 2000, and a Master of Laws Degree in Banking & Financial Law, and Securities Regulation from Boston University School of Law in 2002.

== Political career ==
Natale gained his first exposure to municipal government as a member of Woburn's Conservation Commission.

In 2003, Natale ran unsuccessfully for alderman at large in Woburn.

In 2004, Natale was elected to the Massachusetts House of Representatives. During his tenure he worked on a sex offender bill known The Presti Bill and on Melanie’s Law on drunk driving. In 2005 he was the only representative to vote against the $300 million House supplemental budget, which he opposed on the grounds that the bill's amendments contained an excessive amount of pork. Natale was also credited with helping secure $200,000 to help Reading pay to decommission its water plant and $25,000 to help refurbish the Joshua Eaton Elementary School clock tower. He served on the Committee on Revenue, Joint Committee on Transportation, and Joint Committee on Veterans and Federal Affairs.

Natale was a candidate for the 4th Middlesex district State Senate seat vacated by Robert Havern III in 2007. During the campaign, Natale got into an argument in the House chamber with opponent and fellow Representative Charles A. Murphy. Natale lost in the Democratic primary to J. James Marzilli Jr.

In 2008, Natale lost his House seat when he was defeated by James J. Dwyer in the Democratic primary.

== Health ==
Shortly after the 2008 election, Natale discovered that he had late stage Melanoma and that it was spreading rapidly. After 5 surgeries and an extensive chemotherapy regimen, Natale was able to make a recovery.

== Legal trouble ==
In 1988, Natale was arrested and charged with assault and battery on a police officer and disturbing the peace. He was found not guilty and later unsuccessfully sued the city of Woburn for alleged injuries he sustained during the incident.

Between May 2009 and February 2010, Natale was arrested three times for domestic assault and battery. He was found not guilty in two jury trials and authorities opted not to prosecute in the third case.

On July 19, 2013, Natale was arrested at a sobriety checkpoint on Route 1A in Seabrook, New Hampshire. He was charged with operating while under the influence of alcohol. On February 2, 2014, Natale's name was on the New Hampshire Director of Motor Vehicles' list of Driving While Intoxicated revocations.

== Return to politics ==
On May 9, 2013, Natale announced that he would run for Mayor in the upcoming election. He faced incumbent Scott Galvin and retired businessman John Flaherty. Natale failed to show up for the only mayoral debate, with no reason given according to event organizers. He later finished a distant third in the preliminary election with only 2.5% of the votes, eliminating him from the mayoral race.

== Electoral history ==
Patrick Natale electoral history

2004 Democratic primary for the Massachusetts House of Representatives, 30th Middlesex District

- Patrick Natale - 1,878 (49.8%)
- Scott Galvin (Write-in) - 902 (23.9%)
- Edward R. Quinn - 543 (14.4%)
- Wiliam M. Rabbitt - 431 (11.4%)

2004 General Election for the Massachusetts House of Representatives, 30th Middlesex District

- Patrick Natale (D) - 10,628 (62.1%)
- Paul J. Meaney (I) - 6,459 (37.8%)

2007 special Democratic primary for the Massachusetts Senate, 4th Middlesex District

- Jim Marzilli - 6,633 (34.8%)
- Ken Donnelly - 4,440 (25.7%)
- Charles A. Murphy - 3,574 (20.7%)
- Patrick Natale - 2,599 (15.0%)

2008 Democratic primary for the Massachusetts House of Representatives, 30th Middlesex District

- James J. Dwyer - 3,473 (59.7%)
- Patrick Natale - 2,344 (40.3%)

2013 preliminary election for Mayor of Woburn

- Scott Galvin - 3,818 (65.2%)
- John Flaherty - 1,895 (32.3%)
- Patrick Natale - 145 (2.5%)
