= Ed Markey =

American politician (born 1946)

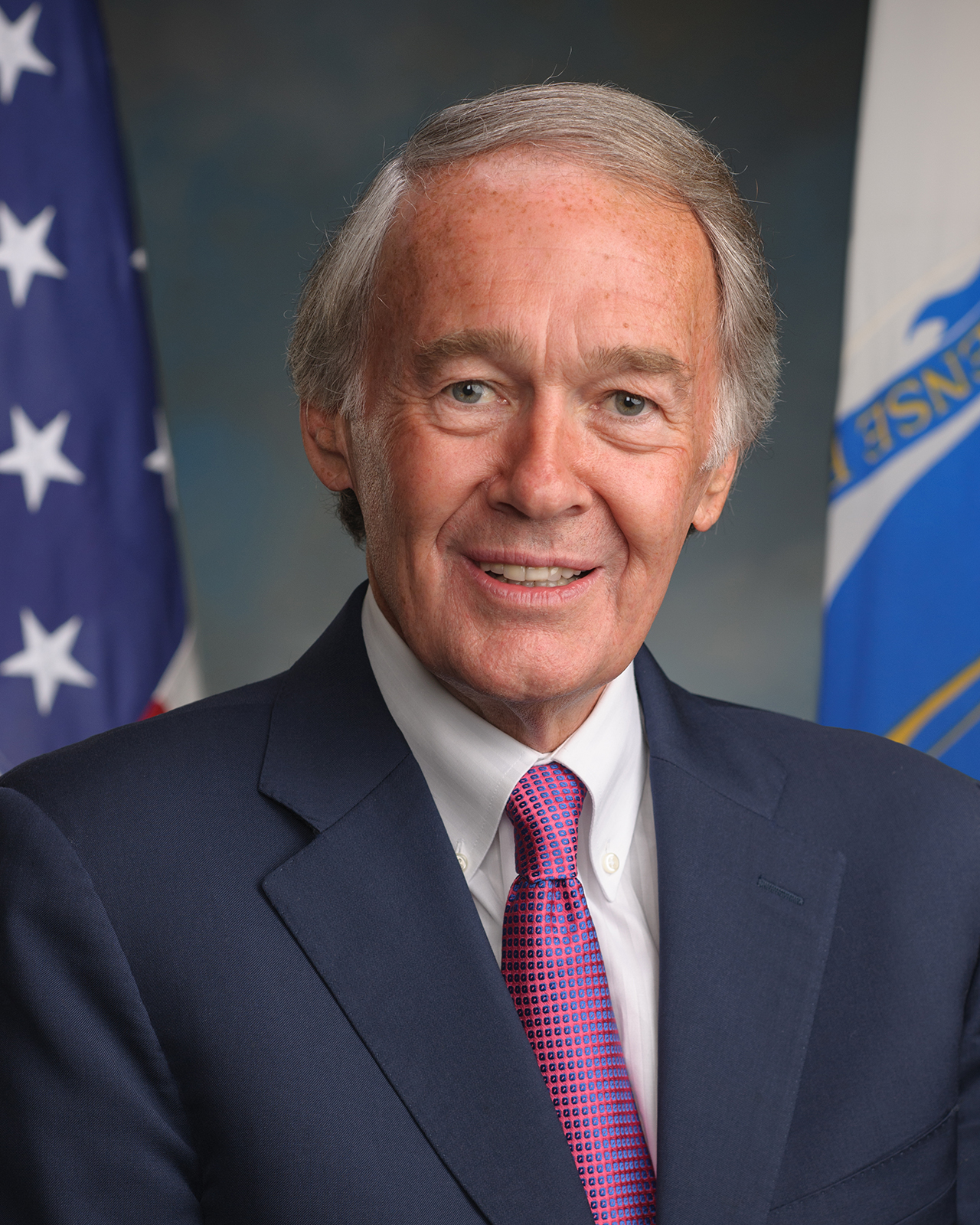
- Official portrait, 2013

Ranking Member of the Senate Small Business Committee
- Incumbent
- Assumed office January 3, 2025
- Preceded by: Joni Ernst

United States Senator from Massachusetts
- Incumbent
- Assumed office July 16, 2013 Serving with Elizabeth Warren
- Preceded by: Mo Cowan

Chair of the House Global Warming Committee
- In office March 8, 2007 – January 6, 2011
- Preceded by: Position established
- Succeeded by: Position abolished

Member of the U.S. House of Representatives from Massachusetts
- In office November 2, 1976 – July 15, 2013
- Preceded by: Torbert Macdonald
- Succeeded by: Katherine Clark
- Constituency: 7th district (1976–2013); 5th district (2013)

Member of the Massachusetts House of Representatives
- In office January 3, 1973 – November 2, 1976
- Preceded by: William Callahan
- Succeeded by: John McNeil
- Constituency: 16th Middlesex (1973–1975); 26th Middlesex (1975–1976)

Personal details
- Born: Edward John Markey; July 11, 1946 (age 80) Malden, Massachusetts, U.S.
- Party: Democratic
- Spouse: Susan Blumenthal (m. 1988)
- Education: Boston College (BA, JD)
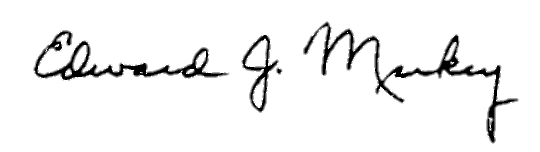
- Signature
- Website: Senate website Campaign website

Military service
- Branch/service: United States Army; Army Reserve
- Years of service: 1968–1973
- Rank: Specialist 4
- Markey's voice Markey questions witnesses on healthcare worker shortages. Recorded February 16, 2023

Edward John Markey (born July 11, 1946) is an American politician serving as the junior United States senator from the state of Massachusetts, a seat he has held since 2013. A member of the Democratic Party, he served 20 terms (18 full, two partial) as the U.S. representative for Massachusetts's 7th congressional district from 1976 to 2013. Before that, he was a member of the Massachusetts House of Representatives from 1973 to 1976. He has been the dean of Massachusetts's congressional delegation since 2009.

In 2013, after John Kerry was appointed United States Secretary of State, Markey was elected to serve out the remainder of Kerry's Senate term in a 2013 special election. Markey defeated Stephen Lynch in the Democratic primary and Republican Gabriel E. Gomez in the general election. He was elected to a full term in the Senate in 2014. Markey fended off a primary challenge from Joseph Kennedy III and was reelected in 2020 by a wide margin. Markey defeated John Deaton in 2026 to win his third full term.

Markey is a progressive who has focused on climate change and energy policy and chaired the House Select Committee on Energy Independence and Global Warming from 2007 to 2011. He is the Senate author of the Green New Deal and is a member of the Senate Fight Club.

== Early life and education ==
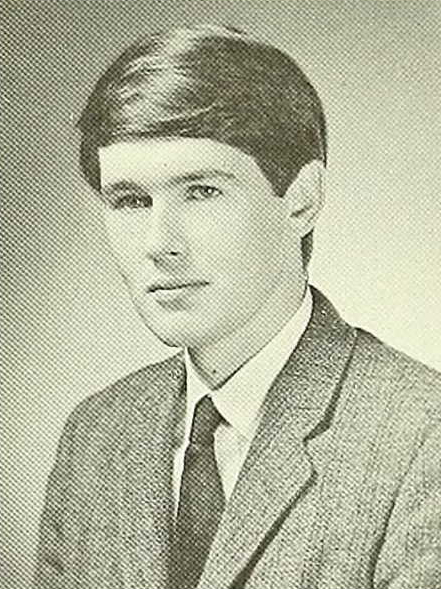
Markey in the Boston College yearbook, 1968

Markey was born on July 11, 1946, in Malden, Massachusetts, the son of Christina M. (née Courtney) and John E. Markey, a milkman. Markey's mother was the valedictorian of her high school class but was unable to attend college because her mother died and she was needed to care for the family. The family was Irish Catholic, and Markey was educated at Immaculate Conception School and Malden Catholic High School.

Starting in the summer of 1965, Markey was the driver and salesperson for an ice cream truck in Lexington, Massachusetts. He was known as "Eddie the Ice Cream Man" to neighborhood children and used the proceeds from the HP Hood route to pay tuition at Boston College. In the late 1960s Markey was cited by the Lexington Police for the ringing of his bell to announce the ice cream truck's presence. Soon after the citation, the selectmen of Lexington changed the ordinance and he was allowed to ring his bell.

Markey graduated from Boston College in 1968 with a Bachelor of Arts and from Boston College Law School in 1972 with a Juris Doctor.

== Career ==
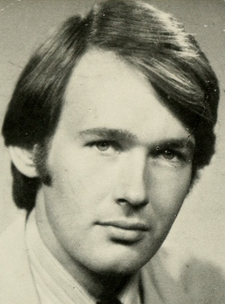
Edward Markey, 1975

After graduating, Markey worked as a lawyer in private practice. He served in the United States Army Reserve from 1968 to 1973, attaining the rank of Specialist 4. He joined while a junior in college, and has said that he enlisted before knowing whether he would receive a Vietnam War draft notice. (Note: Markey was not drafted. His birth date corresponded to number 248 in the 1969 military draft. The highest number called up for military service was 195.) Markey also said that even though he opposed the war, he would have answered the induction notice and gone to Vietnam if he had been drafted, despite having secured a position in the Reserve. His South Boston reserve unit included Thomas P. O'Neill III, Steve Grossman, and Markey's brothers Richard and John.

Markey was elected to the Massachusetts House of Representatives, where he represented the 16th Middlesex district (Malden and Melrose) and 26th Middlesex district from 1973 to 1976.

== U.S. House of Representatives ==
=== Elections ===
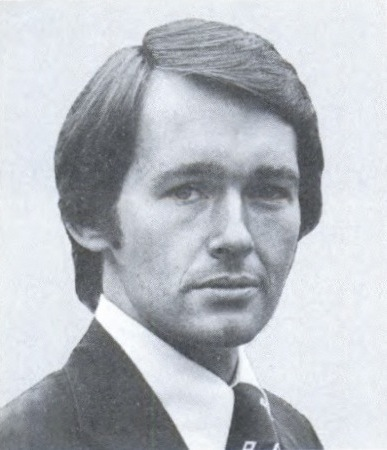
Markey during the 101st United States Congress (1989)

On May 21, 1976, incumbent Congressman Torbert Macdonald died in office. Markey, who had just been elected to a third term in the state house, entered a twelve-candidate Democratic primary for what was then the 7th district. In the primary—the real contest in this heavily Democratic district—Markey won the nomination with a plurality of 22% of the vote. In the November 1976 election he defeated Republican Richard Daly 77%–18%. That election doubled as both a special election for the balance of Macdonald's 11th term and a regular election for a full two-year term, and so Markey took office later that night. This gave him greater seniority than other Representatives first elected in 1976.

Markey was challenged in a Democratic primary three times, first in 1980, when he won 85%; then in 1984, when he won 54%; and finally in 2002, when he won 85% of the vote.

Markey was reelected 19 more times from this district, which included most of the northern suburbs of Boston. His lowest vote total was 62% in 1992, in a three-way election. Markey faced no Republican opposition in eight of his bids for reelection, in 1978, 1980, 1986, 1988, 1990, 2000, 2002, and 2006. His district was renumbered the 5th after the 2010 census, in which Massachusetts lost a district.

=== Tenure ===
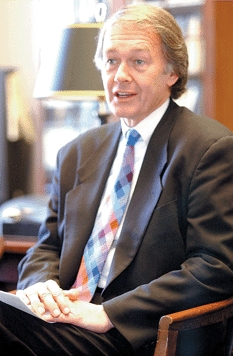
Markey as ranking member of the House Natural Resources Committee

Markey was a member of the Congressional Progressive Caucus, and the National Journal gave him a "Composite Liberal" score of 89.2.

==== Environment and energy ====
In December 2007, Markey became the first US politician to use Second Life, through which he addressed the delegates of the UNFCCC in Bali as part of OneClimate's Virtual Bali event. It was estimated that the carbon dioxide he saved by not flying to Bali was around 5.5 tons. Pressure from Markey prompted BP to provide a live underwater video feed showing oil leaking out of a pipe in the Deepwater Horizon oil spill in 2010. Markey has been a longtime critic of the Nuclear Regulatory Commission (NRC) and has been critical of the NRC's decision-making on the proposed Westinghouse AP1000 reactor design and the NRC response to the Fukushima Daiichi nuclear disaster.

In reply to Alaska's Governor Sarah Palin's position on how the American Clean Energy and Security Act (also known as Waxman-Markey, named after Markey and Henry Waxman) could have a negative impact for Alaskans, Markey wrote an article criticizing Palin's inaction on global warming and her environmental positions.

Markey sarcastically suggested in August 2010 that global warming deniers form their own country on an iceberg: "An iceberg four times the size of Manhattan has broken off Greenland, creating plenty of room for global warming deniers to start their own country." Markey also said that, at the time, 2010 was the hottest recorded year and that "scientists agree Arctic ice is a canary in a coal mine that provides clear warnings on climate". Markey has derided Republicans' stance on global warming, stating during a hearing: "I won't physically rise, because I'm worried that Republicans will overturn the law of gravity, sending us floating about the room."

In January 2011, House Republicans eliminated the Select Committee for Energy Independence and Global Warming, which Nancy Pelosi created in 2006 and Markey chaired.

==== Objection to certifying the 2004 U.S. presidential election results ====
Markey was one of the 31 House Democrats who voted not to count Ohio's 20 electoral votes in the 2004 U.S. presidential election. In 2004, President George W. Bush (the Republican nominee) had defeated Senator John Kerry (the Democratic nominee) in Ohio by 118,457 votes. Without Ohio's electoral votes, the 2004 presidential election would have been decided by the U.S. House of Representatives, with each state having one vote, as dictated by the Twelfth Amendment to the United States Constitution.

==== Domestic initiatives ====
Markey introduced legislation to change the duration of Daylight Saving Time and to increasing privacy controls over children online.

Markey drew some controversy through his proposal to introduce legislation that deals with amusement parks' roller coasters, believing that newer, faster rides that exert greater G-pressures on the human body are dangerous mentally and physically, despite a lack of concrete evidence to support these claims, and contrary to studies that affirmed the safety of roller coasters in general.

In 2009, Markey sponsored the Internet Freedom Preservation Act to enact principles of net neutrality. The proposed legislation received support from a few dozen co-sponsors and public interest organizations but ultimately died in committee before enactment.

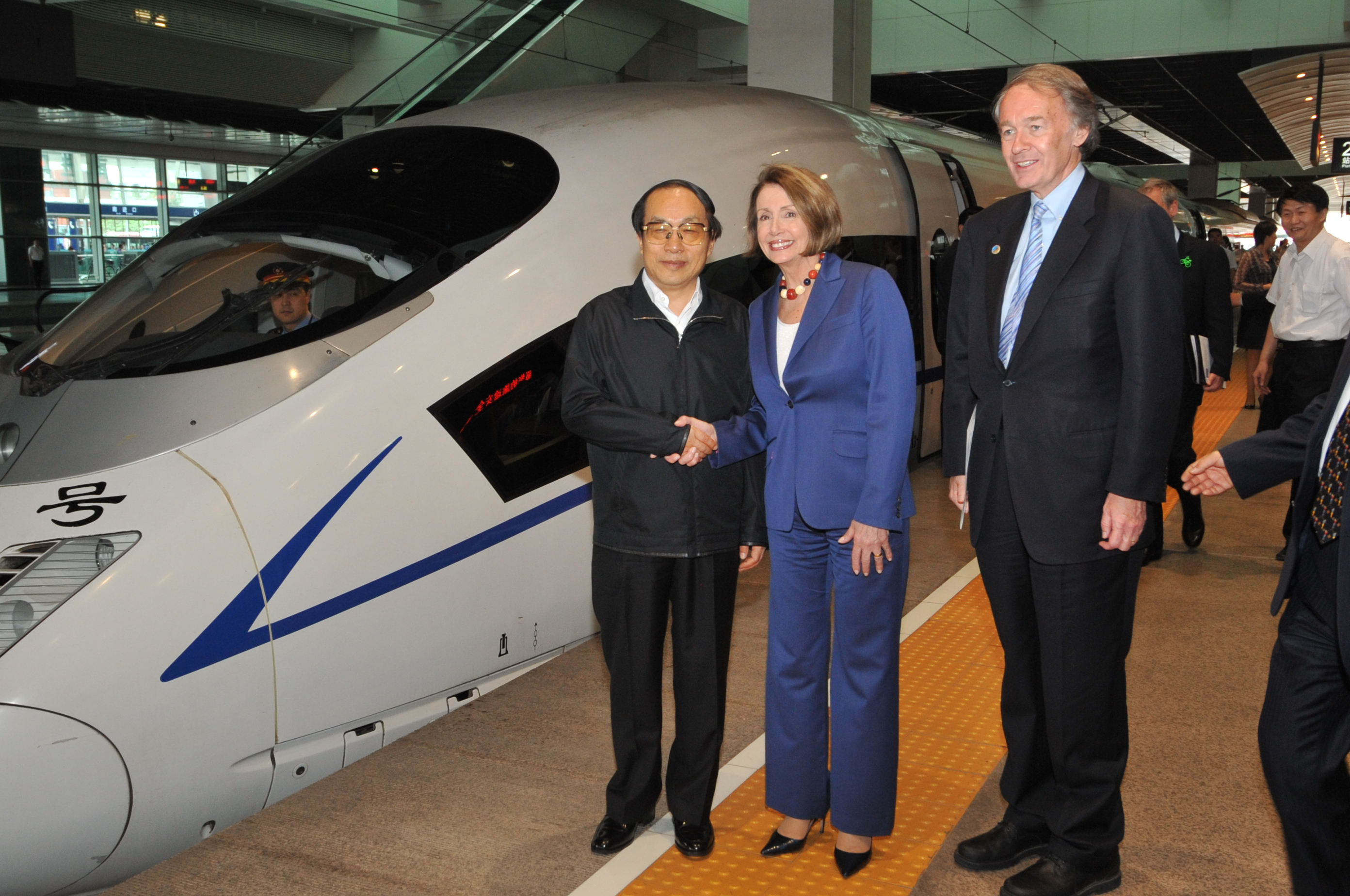
Rep. Markey (right) with Chinese Minister of Railways Liu Zhijun (left) and U.S. House Speaker Nancy Pelosi (center) in May 2009. Behind them is a Hexie Hao train on the Beijing–Tianjin Intercity Railway.

==== National defense ====
In 2003, Markey called attention to the lack of security surrounding air cargo placed on commercial passenger planes, arguing that if passenger baggage is screened for explosive devices, cargo on the plane should be as well. In 2007, he succeeded in getting a 100% air cargo screening requirement signed into law. In the law codifying the recommendations of the 9/11 Commission, Markey wrote the mandate requiring all cargo on passenger planes to be screened.

=== Committee assignments ===
- Committee on Energy and Commerce
  - Subcommittee on Communications and Technology
  - Subcommittee on Energy and Power
  - Subcommittee on Oversight and Investigations
- Committee on Natural Resources (Ranking Member)
  - As Ranking Member, Markey served as an ex officio member on all Subcommittees

== U.S. Senate ==
In 2004, Markey was considered a contender for John Kerry's seat in the U.S. Senate if Kerry were to be elected President of the United States. He was also considered a leading contender in the 2010 special election to replace the late Ted Kennedy, but on September 12, 2009, he announced his decision not to run and endorsed fellow Congressman Michael Capuano, who went on to lose the Democratic primary to Martha Coakley.

=== Elections ===
==== 2013 special ====
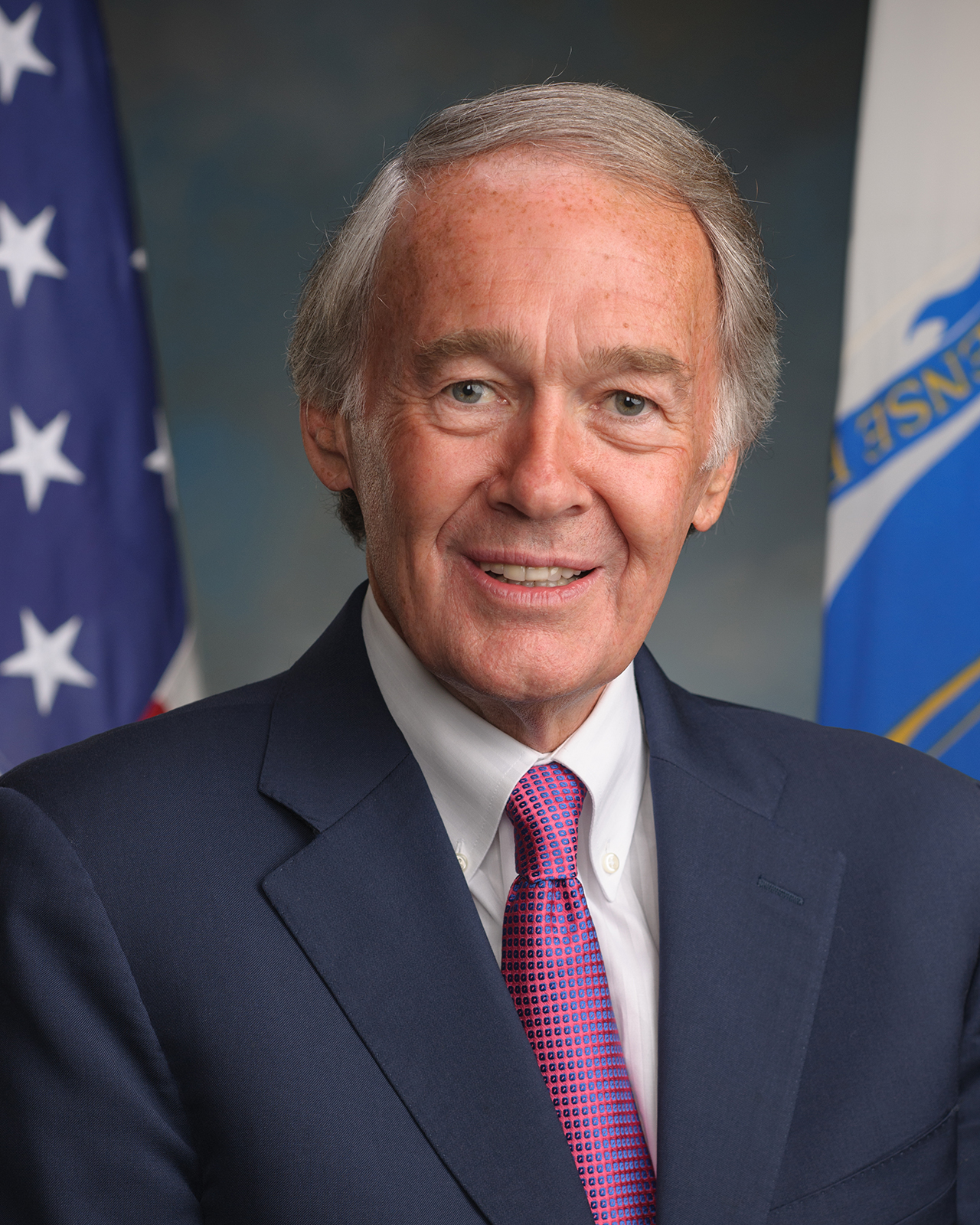
Official portrait in 2013

On December 27, 2012, Markey was the first to announce his candidacy to run in a special election to fill Kerry's seat after President Barack Obama nominated him for U.S. Secretary of State. Several politicians, including Kerry, endorsed Markey even before the Senate confirmed Kerry. On April 30, 2013, Markey won the Democratic nomination, defeating fellow congressman Stephen Lynch in the primary election. He defeated Republican nominee Gabriel E. Gomez in the general special election on June 25 and served the remaining 17 months of Kerry's term.

Markey is the longest-tenured House member ever elected to the Senate, with his 36-plus years of service exceeding that of Frederick H. Gillett, who served in the House for 32 years before moving to the upper chamber in 1925. He is the 11th oldest candidate to win a U.S. Senate special election out of more than 170 people since the passage of the 17th Amendment of the U.S. Constitution.

==== 2014 ====
Markey sought a full six-year term in 2014. He defeated Republican Hopkinton selectman Brian Herr with 62% of the vote.

==== 2020 ====
In the 2020 Democratic Party presidential primaries, Markey endorsed fellow Massachusetts Senator Elizabeth Warren. After Warren withdrew in early 2020, he endorsed Joe Biden.

Several Massachusetts Democrats announced primary challenges to Markey in the September 1, 2020 election, but all but 4th district Representative Joe Kennedy III dropped out, leaving Kennedy as the sole challenger. On September 13, 2019, Representative Alexandria Ocasio-Cortez, with whom Markey has collaborated on the proposed Green New Deal, endorsed Markey.

Markey defeated Kennedy with 55.6% of the vote, with overwhelming margins in Boston and the surrounding suburbs, including Kennedy's Newton, and in the college towns of Western Massachusetts. The primary race was seen by many as a showdown between the Democratic establishment, represented by Kennedy, and its new and growing progressive wing, embodied by Markey. Despite the Democratic Congressional Campaign Committee's longstanding opposition to Democratic primary challengers, House Speaker Nancy Pelosi endorsed Kennedy, whose fundraising and campaigning efforts she credited for returning the House to Democratic control in the 2018 midterm elections. Meanwhile, Markey had the support of Senate Minority Leader Chuck Schumer, Senator Elizabeth Warren, Ocasio-Cortez, and the youth-led Sunrise Movement founded in 2017 to promote the Green New Deal as a solution to the climate crisis.

Markey defeated Republican Kevin O'Connor in the general election.

==== 2026 ====
In October 2024, Markey said he intended to run for another Senate term in 2026: "I'm ready to stand for reelection and that is my full intention". From the onset of his campaign, his age was a central issue. A 2024 University of Massachusetts Amherst/WCVB poll found that 72% of Massachusetts residents supported age limits for US senators. Markey, who would be 80 years old on Election Day, fended off these concerns, saying, "I'm ready for the fight [...] I am more energized [than ever]".

In October 2025, US Representative Seth Moulton announced his candidacy for the Democratic nomination for US Senate in Massachusetts, running against Markey. Moulton, who is 33 years younger than Markey, made generational change a central issue of his campaign. Markey made his progressive policies a focus of his campaign, highlighting his support of Medicare for All and pushing back against President Donald Trump.

During the primary campaign, Markey was endorsed by a slate of progressive politicians, including Senators Elizabeth Warren and Bernie Sanders and Representatives Ayanna Pressley and Alexandria Ocasio-Cortez.

On September 1, 2026, Markey defeated Moulton in the primary with approximately 65% of the vote.

=== Tenure ===
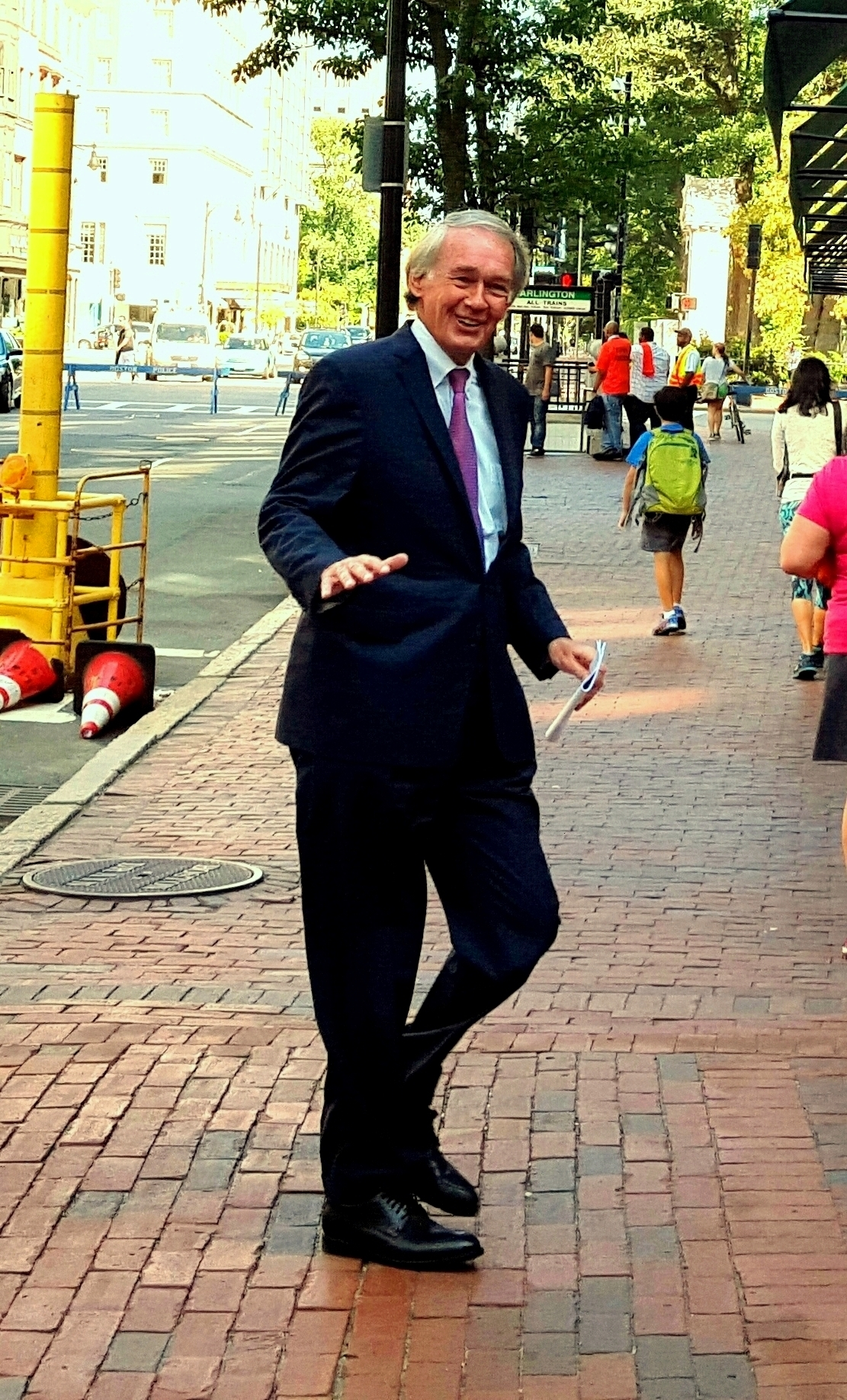
Senator Markey attending the Greater Boston Labor Council's 2015 annual Labor Day Breakfast in Boston

Markey resigned his U.S. House seat on July 15, 2013, and was sworn into the U.S. Senate on July 16. Although he is the dean of the Massachusetts delegation, he is the state's junior Senator, since Elizabeth Warren took office six months before he did.

Markey is known for the "blizzard" of public letters he posts on his website and sends to the press to draw attention to his favored issues.

Markey was on Capitol Hill to participate in the 2021 United States Electoral College vote count when Trump supporters attacked the U.S. Capitol. During the attack, he and his staff sheltered in place in an undisclosed location. During the siege, he tweeted, "Donald Trump is responsible for the coup that is unfolding at the Capitol. He is a fascist and a direct threat to our country." After the Capitol was secure, Markey tweeted that Trump should be impeached. When Congress returned to count the electoral votes, Markey gave his remarks, calling Republicans who objected to the count seditious. The next day, he called for the 25th amendment to the U.S. Constitution to be invoked.

After President Donald Trump's July 16, 2026, address to the nation, in which he spoke about election security and the PRC's alleged involvement in attempting to subvert U.S. elections, Markey responded on Twitter by once again calling for Trump's impeachment: "Trump must be impeached for undermining and subverting our free and fair elections."

Markey was rated among the top ten most popular senators in a Morning Consult poll from April 2024.

=== Committee assignments ===
- Committee on Commerce, Science, and Transportation
  - Subcommittee on Communications, Media, and Broadband
  - Subcommittee on Consumer Protection, Product Safety, and Data Security
  - Subcommittee on Oceans, Atmosphere, Fisheries, and Coast Guard
  - Subcommittee on Science and Space
  - Subcommittee on Surface Transportation and Merchant Marine Infrastructure, Safety, and Security
- Committee on Environment and Public Works
  - Subcommittee on Clean Air and Nuclear Safety
  - Subcommittee on Water and Wildlife
  - Subcommittee on Superfund, Toxics and Environmental Health
  - Subcommittee on Transportation and Infrastructure
- Committee on Health, Education, Labor and Pensions
  - Subcommittee on Primary Health & Retirement Security (Chair)
  - Subcommittee on Employment and Workplace Safety
- Committee on Small Business and Entrepreneurship (Ranking Member)

=== Caucus memberships ===
- Rare Disease Caucus
- Senate Taiwan Caucus

== Political positions ==
=== Economic and labor policy ===
In August 2013, Markey was one of 23 Democratic senators to sign a letter to the Department of Defense warning that some payday lenders were "offering predatory loan products to service members at exorbitant triple digit effective interest rates and loan products that do not include the additional protections envisioned by the law" and asserting that service members and their families "deserve the strongest possible protections and swift action to ensure that all forms of credit offered to members of our armed forces are safe and sound."

In May 2018, Markey led 11 senators in signing a letter to the Chairman of the Federal Labor Relations Authority Colleen Kiko urging the FLRA to end efforts to close its Boston regional office until Congress debated the matter because the closure would place staff farther away from the federal employees whose rights they protect.

In 2019, Markey and 34 other senators introduced the Child Care for Working Families Act, a bill that they claim would create 770,000 new child care jobs and ensure that families making less than 75% of the state median income would not pay for child care, with higher-earning families having to pay "their fair share for care on a sliding scale, regardless of the number of children they have." The legislation also supports universal access to high-quality preschool programs for all 3- and 4-year-olds and changes child care compensation and training.

==== Antitrust ====
In February 2019, Markey was among eight senators to sign a letter to the Federal Communications Commission and Department of Justice asking that regulators prohibit a proposed $26-billion merger between T-Mobile and Sprint because American enforcers have understood for the last 30 years "that fostering robust competition in telecommunications markets is the best way to provide every American with access to high-quality, cutting-edge communications at a reasonable price" and the merger would result in a return "to the dark days of heavily consolidated markets and less competition, with all of the resulting harms."

In March 2019, Markey was among six senators to sign a letter to the Federal Trade Commission (FTC) requesting that it "use its rulemaking authority, along with other tools, in order to combat the scourge of non-compete clauses rigging our economy against workers" and saying that non-compete clauses "harm employees by limiting their ability to find alternate work, which leaves them with little leverage to bargain for better wages or working conditions with their immediate employer." The letter added that the FTC was responsible for protecting consumers and workers and needed to "act decisively" to address their concerns over "serious anti-competitive harms from the proliferation of non-competes in the economy."

In June 2019, Markey was one of six Democrats led by Amy Klobuchar who signed letters to the Federal Trade Commission (FTC) and the Department of Justice recounting that many of them had "called on both the FTC and the Justice Department to investigate potential anticompetitive activity in these markets, particularly following the significant enforcement actions taken by foreign competition enforcers against these same companies" and requesting that each agency confirm whether it had opened antitrust investigations into each of the companies and pledge that it would publicly release any such investigation's findings.

==== Housing ====
In April 2019, Markey was one of 41 senators to sign a bipartisan letter to the housing subcommittee praising the Housing and Urban Development Department's Section 4 Capacity Building program as authorizing "HUD to partner with national nonprofit community development organizations to provide education, training, and financial support to local community development corporations (CDCs) across the country" and expressing disappointment that President Trump's budget "has slated this program for elimination after decades of successful economic and community development." The senators hoped the subcommittee would support continued funding for Section 4 in Fiscal Year 2020.

=== Environmental and energy policy ===
==== Climate change ====
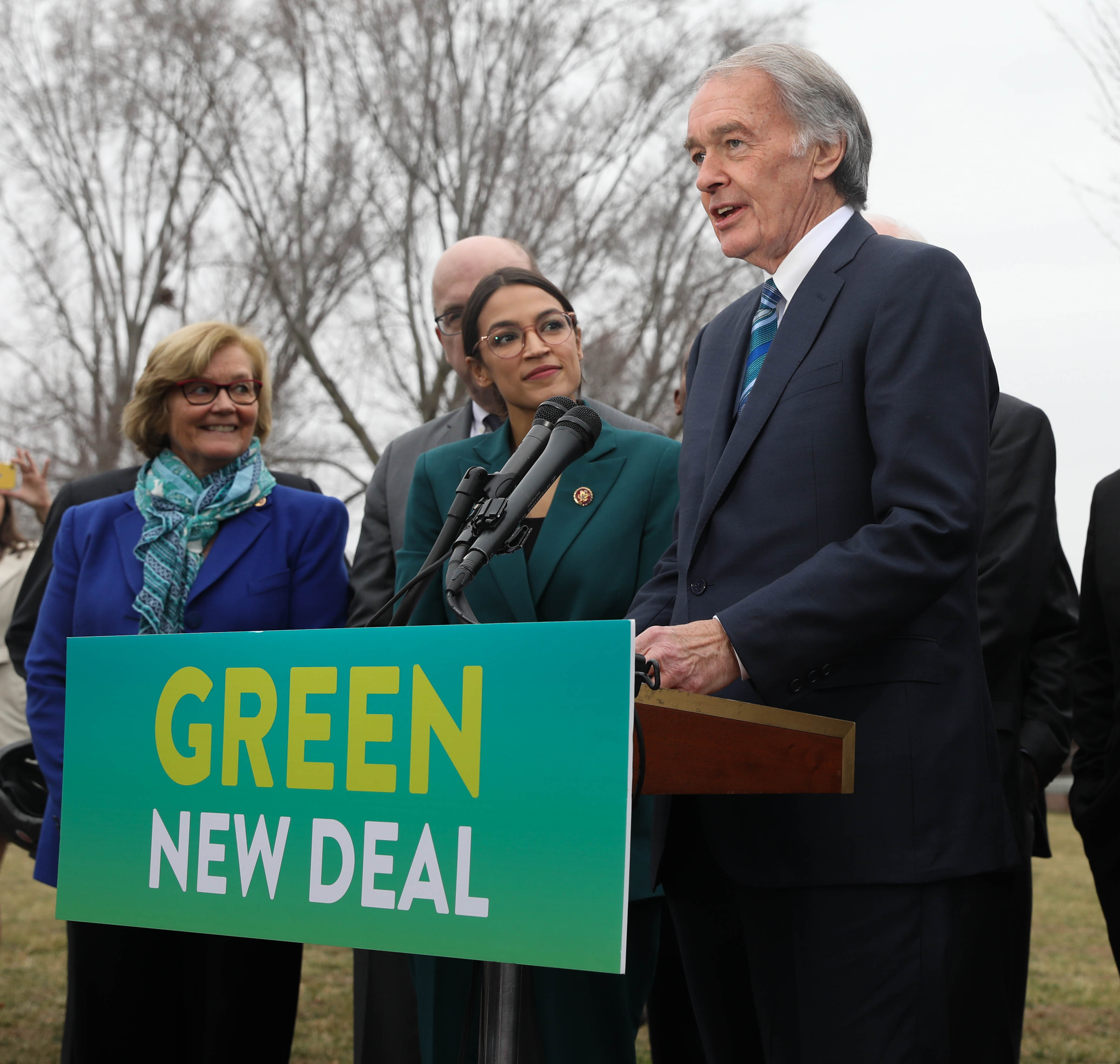
Senator Markey speaks on a Green New Deal in front of the U.S. Capitol Building in February 2019

In November 2018, Markey was among 25 Democratic senators to cosponsor a resolution in response to the Intergovernmental Panel On Climate Change report and National Climate Assessment findings. The resolution affirmed the senators' acceptance of the findings and support for bold action to address climate change. In 2019, the League of Conservation Voters, which works to elect pro-environment candidates, endorsed Markey.

Markey is the Senate author of the Green New Deal. In February 2019, Markey and Representative Alexandria Ocasio-Cortez released a 14-page summary of their Green New Deal plan to address climate change. It calls for implementing the "social cost of carbon" that was part of the Obama administration's plans to address climate change and transitioning the United States to 100% renewable, zero-emission energy sources, zero-emission vehicles, and high-speed rail systems. It also aims to provide new jobs and alleviate poverty. On March 26, in what Democrats called a "stunt", Republicans called for an early vote without allowing discussion or expert testimony. Markey said Republicans were trying to "make a mockery" of the Green New Deal debate and called the vote a "sham". In protest, Democrats, including Markey, voted "present" or against the bill, resulting in a 57–0 defeat on the Senate floor.

In March 2019, Markey was one of 11 senators to sponsor the Climate Security Act of 2019, legislation to form a new group within the State Department to develop strategies to integrate climate science and data into national security operations as well as to restore the post of special envoy for the Arctic, a group that President Trump dismantled in 2017. The envoy would advise the President and the administration on the potential effects of climate on national security and be responsible for facilitating all interagency communication between federal science and security agencies.

Markey was a member of the Senate Democrats' Special Committee on the Climate Crisis, which published a report of its findings in August 2020.

==== Disaster relief ====
In April 2018, Markey was one of five Democratic senators to sign a letter to Federal Emergency Management Agency (FEMA) administrator Brock Long calling on FEMA to enter an agreement with the Department of Housing and Urban Development (HUD) that would "stand up the Disaster Housing Assistance Program (DHAP) and address the medium- and longer-term housing needs" of evacuees of Puerto Rico in the aftermath of Hurricane Maria. The senators asserted that "FEMA's refusal to use the tools at its disposal, including DHAP, to help these survivors is puzzling—and profoundly troubling" and that hundreds of hurricane survivors were susceptible to being left homeless if FEMA and HUD continued not to work together.

==== Energy policy ====
In October 2016, Markey was one of five senators to sign a letter to President Obama requesting the administration halt work on the Dakota Access Pipeline until the Army Corps's permitting process was transparent and would "include public notice and participation, formal and meaningful tribal consultation, and adequate environmental review", and stating their support for the "tribes along the pipeline route in their fight against the Dakota Access pipeline project."

In July 2019, Markey was an original cosponsor of the Sensible, Timely Relief for America's Nuclear Districts' Economic Development (STRANDED) Act, a bipartisan bill introduced by Susan Collins and Tammy Duckworth that would give local government entities economic impact grants to offset the economic impact of stranded nuclear waste, form a task force to identify existing funding that could be used to benefit communities, and form a competitive innovative solutions prize competition to aid those communities in their search for alternatives to "nuclear facilities, generating sites, and waste sites."

=== Foreign policy ===
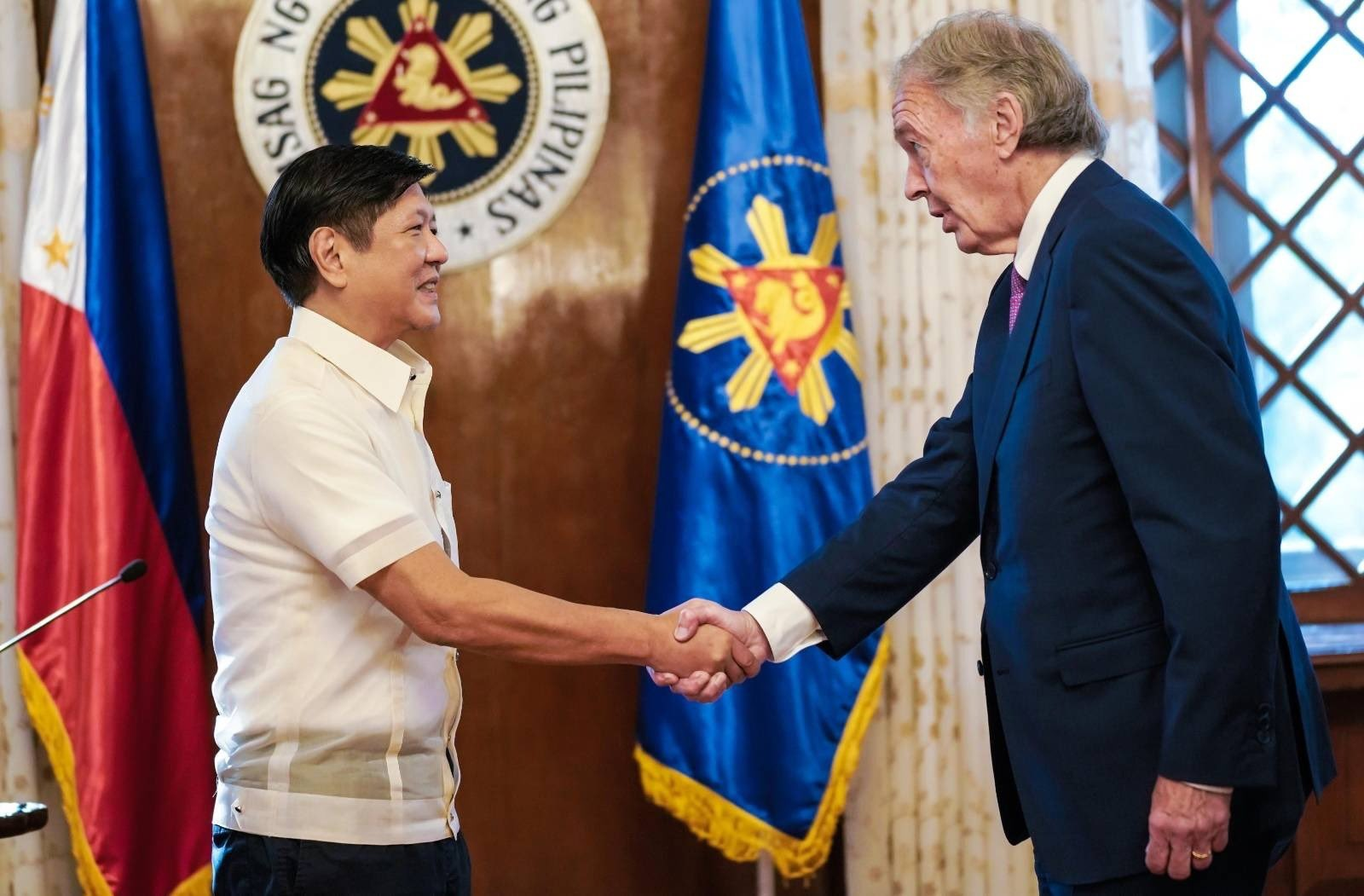
Senator Markey meets with Philippine president Bongbong Marcos in Manila in August 2022.

On October 10, 2002, Markey voted in favor of the Authorization for Use of Military Force Against Iraq Resolution of 2002, authorizing the use of the United States Armed Forces against Saddam Hussein's government in what became Operation Iraqi Freedom. As of March 2020, Markey has said that voting for the authorization was a "mistake", and that he did so because "George Bush lied, Donald Rumsfeld lied, Dick Cheney lied to the American people about the presence of nuclear weapons in Iraq. I'm still angry about that lie to the American people."

In December 2016, Markey and Senators Chris Coons and Marco Rubio suggested to the Department of State that the U.S. curtail assistance to the Philippines' law enforcement units due to alleged extrajudicial killings and other human rights violations in Philippine president Rodrigo Duterte's drug war, in adherence to the Leahy Law. In April 2019, Markey and four other Democratic and Republican senators introduced a resolution urging the release of Philippine senator Leila de Lima, a key proponent of the inquiry on the Duterte administration's reported human rights violations who has been detained since 2017 for suspected drug trafficking; the senators believed that De Lima's detention was politically motivated. In January 2020, Markey revealed that the Philippine government had declared him and Senators Dick Durbin and Patrick Leahy (principal sponsor of the Leahy Law) persona non grata to the country. After Duterte stepped down from office in 2022, Markey visited the Philippines and met with De Lima privately.

In October 2017, Markey condemned the genocide of the Rohingya Muslim minority in Myanmar.

In 2018, Markey cosponsored the Countering the Chinese Government and Communist Party's Political Influence Operations Act, a bill introduced by Rubio and Catherine Cortez Masto that would give the Secretary of State and the Director of National Intelligence (DNI) the authority to create an interagency task force to examine Chinese attempts to influence the U.S. and key allies.

In October 2018, Markey was one of eight senators to sign a letter to Director of National Intelligence Dan Coats requesting a classified briefing on what the American intelligence community knew about threats to U.S.-based Saudi journalist Jamal Khashoggi so that the senators could fulfill their "oversight obligation" as members of Congress. In March 2019, Markey was one of nine Democratic senators to sign a letter to Salman of Saudi Arabia requesting the release of human rights lawyer Waleed Abu al-Khair and writer Raif Badawi, women's rights activists Loujain al-Hathloul and Samar Badawi, and Dr. Walid Fitaih. The senators wrote, "Not only have reputable international organizations detailed the arbitrary detention of peaceful activists and dissidents without trial for long periods, but the systematic discrimination against women, religious minorities and mistreatment of migrant workers and others has also been well-documented."

In November 2018, Markey, Senators Chris Coons and Elizabeth Warren and a bipartisan group of lawmakers sent the Trump administration a letter raising concerns about the People's Republic of China's undue influence on media outlets and academic institutions in the United States. They wrote: "In American news outlets, Beijing has used financial ties to suppress negative information about the CCP... Beijing has also sought to use relationships with American academic institutions and student groups to shape public discourse."

In February 2019, ahead of the 2019 North Korea–United States Hanoi Summit, Markey said that it was "pretty clear that Kim wants to have a personal meeting with Trump with hopes that he can, in fact, elicit concessions from President Trump that might not otherwise be possible if it was just our diplomats talking one-on-one" and that the US "could run the risk that Kim is given concessions which are not accompanied by real concessions that the United States is receiving in return from Kim and his regime." Markey called for Trump to receive commitments on denuclearization from Kim Jong-un before making commitments in return.

In April 2019, Markey was among 34 senators to sign a letter to President Trump encouraging him "to listen to members of your own Administration and reverse a decision that will damage our national security and aggravate conditions inside Central America", asserting that Trump had "consistently expressed a flawed understanding of U.S. foreign assistance" since becoming president and that he was "personally undermining efforts to promote U.S. national security and economic prosperity" by preventing the use of Fiscal Year 2018 national security funding. The senators argued that foreign assistance to Central American countries created less migration to the U.S. by helping to improve conditions in those countries.

In October 2020, Markey accused Turkey, a NATO ally, of inciting war between Armenia and Azerbaijan over the disputed region of Nagorno-Karabakh and called on the Trump administration to immediately suspend U.S. military aid to Azerbaijan sent through the Pentagon's "building partner assistance program". According to critics, the aid could be used in the Nagorno-Karabakh conflict. He co-signed a letter to Secretary of State Mike Pompeo that read: "If Turkey is unwilling to step back from active engagement in the conflict, then the State Department should immediately suspend all sales and transfers of military equipment to Ankara."

In January 2024, Markey voted for a resolution proposed by Senator Bernie Sanders to apply the human rights provisions of the Foreign Assistance Act to U.S. aid to Israel's military. The proposal was defeated, 72 to 11. In April 2025, Markey voted for a pair of resolutions Sanders proposed to cancel the Trump administration's sales of $8.8 billion in bombs and other munitions to Israel. The proposals were defeated, 82 to 15.

=== Government reform ===
In September 2018, Markey was one of five senators who signed a letter to Secretary of State Mike Pompeo urging him to employ more multifactor authentication measures to secure the State Department's information systems and seeking answers on how the department would boost its security following the Office of Management and Budget's designation of the department's cyber readiness as "high risk", what the department would do to address the lack of multifactor authentication required by law and statistics on the department's cyber incidents over the last three years.

In March 2019, Markey was among 39 senators signed a letter to the Appropriations Committee opining that contractor workers and, by extension, their families "should not be penalized for a government shutdown that they did nothing to cause" while noting that there were bills in both chambers of Congress that if enacted would provide back pay to compensate contractor employees for lost wages. The letter urged the Appropriations Committee "to include back pay for contractor employees in a supplemental appropriations bill for FY2019 or as part of the regular appropriations process for FY2020."

In April 2021, Markey sponsored a bill in the Senate to expand the Supreme Court of the United States from nine to 13 justices.

=== Health care ===
Markey supports the creation of a single-payer federal healthcare program. In September 2017, he was one of 16 senators to cosponsor the 2017 Medicare for All Act introduced by Bernie Sanders, which proposes establishing a federal health insurance program by expanding Medicare coverage to all United States residents.

In June 2019, Markey was one of eight senators to cosponsor the Territories Health Equity Act of 2019, legislation that would remove the cap on annual federal Medicaid funding and increase the federal matching rate for Medicaid expenditures of territories along with providing more funds for prescription drug coverage to low-income seniors in an attempt to equalize funding for American territories Puerto Rico, the Virgin Islands, Guam, American Samoa, and the Northern Mariana Islands with that of U.S. states.

Markey proposed that the COVID-19 vaccine be distributed to underserved areas and communities of color as a priority for racial justice. On February 20, 2021, he said, "Even though Black and Hispanic residents have borne the brunt of this pandemic here in Massachusetts and all across the country, these communities are not receiving the vaccine in proportion to their share of their population."

==== Abortion ====
When he was first elected to Congress, Markey opposed abortion and supported a constitutional amendment to ban it. He described his opposition as a matter of conscience. Starting in 1983, he began moving away from his opposition, voting against measures that blocked funding for abortion for federal employees unless their life was at risk. During his 1984 Senate campaign, Markey said that while he still personally opposed abortion, he believed it should remain legal. Since then, he has opposed restrictions on abortion. Markey wore a pin to the 2023 State of the Union Address with the word ABORTION with a heart in place of the central portion of the letter O. He attended the event with Kate Dineen, an abortion rights advocate.

==== Drug policy ====
In December 2016, Markey was among 17 senators to sign a letter to President-elect Donald Trump asking him to fulfill a campaign pledge to bring down the cost of prescription drugs, stating their willingness "to advance measures to achieve this goal", and calling on Trump "to partner with Republicans and Democrats alike to take meaningful steps to address the high cost of prescription drugs through bold administrative and legislative actions."

In February 2017, Markey and 30 other senators signed a letter to Kaléo Pharmaceuticals in response to an increase of the opioid-overdose-reversing device Evzio's price from $690 in 2014 to $4,500. They requested the detailed price structure for Evzio, the number of devices Kaléo Pharmaceuticals set aside for donation, and the total federal reimbursements Evzio received in the previous year.

In March 2017, Markey led 21 senators who signed a letter to Senate Majority Leader Mitch McConnell that said that 12% of adult Medicaid beneficiaries had some form or a substance abuse disorder, that one-third of treatment for opioid and other substance use disorders in the United States is financed by Medicaid, and that the American Health Care Act could "very literally translate into a death spiral for those with opioid use disorders" due to inadequate funding, often resulting in individuals abandoning substance use disorder treatment.

In December 2018, Markey was among 21 senators to sign a letter to Food and Drugs Commissioner Scott Gottlieb stating their approval of the actions of the Food and Drugs Administration (FDA) to hinder youth access to e-cigarettes and urging the FDA "to take additional, stronger steps to prevent and reduce e-cigarette use among youth." In 2023, Markey introduced legislation to expand access to methadone for patients with opioid use disorder.

=== Law enforcement ===
==== Gun control ====
Markey supports gun control, including improved background checks, ending illegal gun trafficking, and closing loopholes on gun purchases. In 2015, he proposed a "smart gun" bill that aimed to equip handguns with technology, making them usable by only the purchaser.

In January 2016, Markey led 18 senators in signing a letter to Thad Cochran and Barbara Mikulski requesting that the Labor, Health and Education subcommittee hold a hearing on whether to allow the Centers for Disease Control and Prevention (CDC) to fund a study of gun violence and "the annual appropriations rider that some have interpreted as preventing it" with taxpayer dollars. The senators noted their support for taking steps "to fund gun-violence research, because only the United States government is in a position to establish an integrated public-health research agenda to understand the causes of gun violence and identify the most effective strategies for prevention."

After the Orlando nightclub shooting, Markey called for more gun regulations and supported the Feinstein Amendment, which would have made it illegal for suspected terrorists to buy guns. He also supports universal background checks.

In response to the 2017 Las Vegas shooting, Markey said, "This Congress has the responsibility to make sure the NRA stands for 'not relevant anymore' in American politics, and we have to begin this debate now." He co-sponsored a proposal to ban bump stocks, which make semi-automatic weapons act like automatic weapons.

In November 2017, Markey was a cosponsor of the Military Domestic Violence Reporting Enhancement Act, a bill to create a charge of domestic violence under the Uniform Code of Military Justice (UCMJ) and stipulate that convictions must be reported to federal databases to keep abusers from purchasing firearms within three days in an attempt to close a loophole in the UCMJ whereby convicted abusers retain the ability to purchase firearms.

In January 2019, Markey was one of 40 senators to introduce the Background Check Expansion Act, a bill requiring background checks to sell or transfer all firearms, including unlicensed sellers. Exceptions to the bill's background check requirement included transfers between members of law enforcement, loaning firearms for either hunting or sporting events temporarily, giving firearms to members of one's immediate family, firearms being transferred as part of an inheritance, or giving a firearm to another person temporarily for immediate self-defense.

==== Immigration ====
In July 2019, following reports that the Trump administration intended to cease protecting spouses, parents and children of active-duty service members from deportation, Markey was one of 22 senators led by Tammy Duckworth to sign a letter arguing that the protection gave service members the ability "to fight for the United States overseas and not worry that their spouse, children, or parents will be deported while they are away" and that its termination would both cause service members personal hardship and negatively affect their combat performance.

Also in July 2019, Markey and 15 other Senate Democrats introduced the Protecting Sensitive Locations Act, which would require, except in special circumstances, that ICE agents get approval from a supervisor before engaging in enforcement actions at sensitive locations and that agents receive annual training in addition to reporting annually on enforcement actions in those locations.

=== Social policy ===
==== Animal welfare ====
In 2025, Markey received a score of 100 from the Humane World Action Fund, the political arm of Humane World for Animals, indicating support for animal protection issues. He was also awarded the organization's "Leader" designation, which is given to members of Congress who, in the organization's assessment, have led on "multiple legislative or regulatory efforts, a top-priority measure, or a requested sign-on letter related to animal protection".

Markey was an endorser of a 2016 Massachusetts ballot measure, Question 3, designed to protect the welfare of farmed animals. The measure required farmers to give chickens, pigs, and calves enough room to turn around, stand up, lie down, and fully extend their limbs. It also prohibited the sale of eggs or meat from animals raised in conditions that did not meet these standards.

Markey was one of only three U.S. senators to cosponsor a 2019 bill that would have placed a moratorium on building new Concentrated Animal Feeding Operations, called "factory farms" by critics, and phased out existing ones.

In 2025, Markey led an effort by 28 senators opposing federal measures that would have limited states' ability to enforce animal welfare laws such as Massachusetts Question 3 and California Proposition 12.

==== LGBTQ rights ====
In 1996, Markey voted against the Defense of Marriage Act.

In September 2014, Markey was one of 69 members of the US House and Senate to sign a letter to FDA commissioner Sylvia Burwell requesting that the FDA revise its policy banning donation of corneas and other tissues by men who have had sex with another man in the preceding five years.

In May 2017, Markey was one of 46 senators to introduce the Equality Act of 2017, described by Representative David Cicilline as ensuring "that every LGBT person can live their lives free from the fear of discrimination. Above all, it's about honoring the values that have guided our nation since its founding. It's critical that Congress pass the Equality Act into law."

In October 2018, Markey was one of 20 senators to sign a letter to Secretary of State Mike Pompeo urging him to reverse the rolling back of a policy that granted visas to same-sex partners of LGBT diplomats who had unions that were not recognized by their home countries, writing that too many places around the world have seen LGBT individuals "subjected to discrimination and unspeakable violence, and receive little or no protection from the law or local authorities" and that refusing to let LGBT diplomats bring their partners to the US would be equivalent of upholding "the discriminatory policies of many countries around the world."

In June 2019, Markey was one of 18 senators to sign a letter to Pompeo requesting an explanation of a State Department decision not to issue an official statement that year commemorating Pride Month nor to issue the annual cable outlining activities for embassies commemorating Pride Month. They also asked why the LGBT special envoy position remained vacant and asserted that "preventing the official flying of rainbow flags and limiting public messages celebrating Pride Month signals to the international community that the United States is abandoning the advancement of LGBTI rights as a foreign policy priority."

In March 2023, Markey and Representative Pramila Jayapal introduced the Transgender Bill of Rights, a resolution that recognizes the federal government's duty to protect the rights of transgender and nonbinary people. The bill strives to codify under law protections to ensure trans and nonbinary Americans are not discriminated against for their gender identity or gender expression.

=== Technology and telecommunications ===
In 2019, after the Federal Communications Commission (FCC) announced changes to the Children's Television Act of 1990, Markey and eight other Democratic senators signed a letter to FCC Chairman Ajit Pai that expressed concern that the proposed changes "would limit the reach of educational content available to children and have a particular damaging effect on youth in low-income and minority communities" and asserted that the new rules would decrease access to valuable educational content through over-the-air services.

==== Internet privacy and security ====
On October 27, 2006, Markey called for the arrest of security researcher Christopher Soghoian for creating a website to generate fake boarding passes. At 2 AM on October 28, 2006, FBI agents seized computers and other materials from Soghoian's house.

On October 29, 2006, Markey issued a statement revising his previous comments, stating that the Department of Homeland Security should instead "put him to work showing public officials how easily our security can be compromised". The statement was critical of Soghoian's disclosure method—deeming it "ill-considered"—but also said that "he should not go to jail for his bad judgment".

In February 2019, Markey, Richard Blumenthal, and Josh Hawley sent Facebook CEO Mark Zuckerberg a letter about Project Atlas and its relevance to "longstanding concerns that Facebook has used its products to deeply intrude into personal privacy."

==== Net neutrality ====
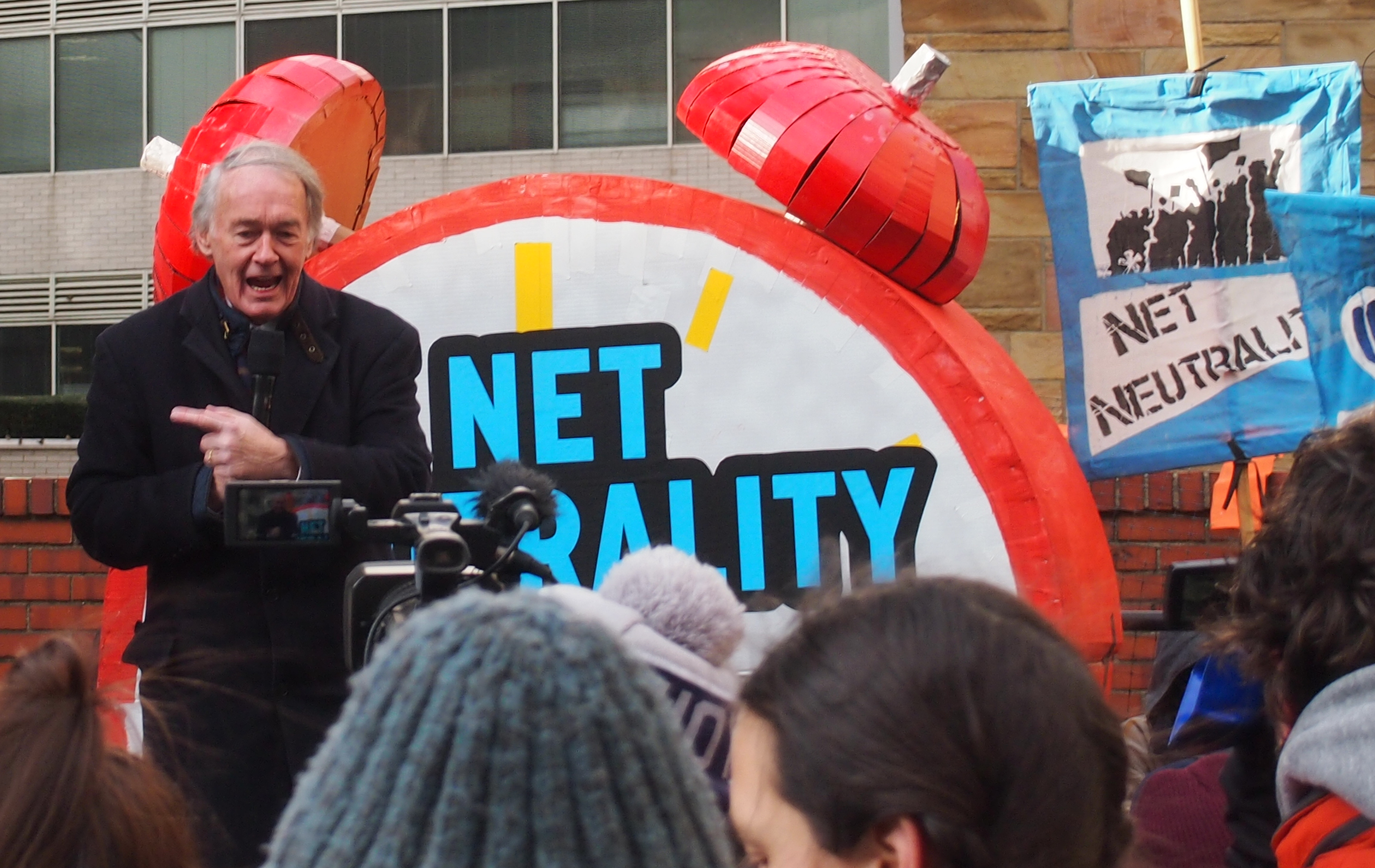
Markey speaks at a rally on Net Neutrality in 2017.

In May 2014, days before the FCC was scheduled to rewrite its net neutrality rules, Markey was one of 11 senators to sign a letter to FCC Chairman Tom Wheeler arguing that Wheeler's proposal would destroy net neutrality and urging the FCC to "consider reclassifying Internet providers to make them more like traditional phone companies, over which the agency has clear authority to regulate more broadly."

In September 2017, Markey was one of nine senators to sign a letter to Federal Communications Commission Chairman Ajit Pai accusing the FCC of failing "to provide stakeholders with an opportunity to comment on the tens of thousands of filed complaints that directly shed light on proposed changes to existing net neutrality protections."

In March 2018, Markey was one of ten senators to sign a letter spearheaded by Jeff Merkley lambasting Pai's proposal to cut the Lifeline program during a period when roughly 6.5 million people in poor communities relied on it for access to high-speed internet, writing that it was Pai's "obligation to the American public, as the Chairman of the Federal Communications Commission, to improve the Lifeline program and ensure that more Americans can afford access, and have means of access, to broadband and phone service." The senators also wrote, "Lifeline reaches more Americans in need of access to communication services."

=== Transportation ===
In June 2019, Markey was one of ten senators to cosponsor the Safe Freight Act, a bill requiring freight trains to have one or more certified conductors and a certified engineer on board who can collaborate on how to protect the train and people living near the tracks. The legislation was meant to correct a Federal Railroad Administration rollback of a proposed rule to establish safety standards.

==== Public transportation ====
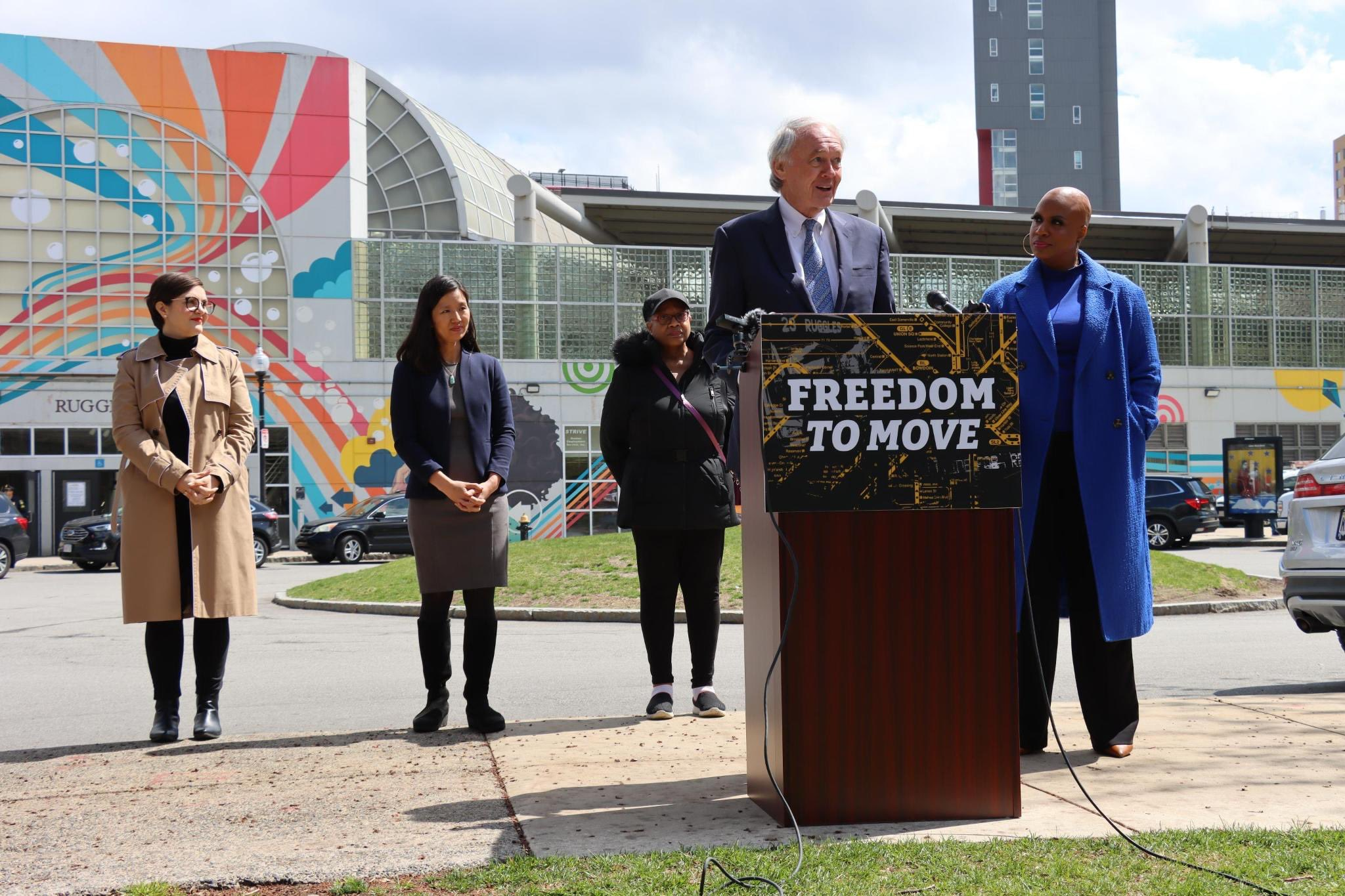
April 2023 press conference by Markey (second from right) and Congresswoman Ayanna Pressley (far right) promoting their "Freedom to Move" legislation. They are joined by Boston Mayor Michelle Wu (second from left) and others.

Markey advocates making public transit fare-free. In June 2020, he and Representative Ayanna Pressley co-authored the Freedom to Move Act, which would offer $5 billion in annual competitive grants to transit agencies that offer fare-free transit access. Markey argues that fare-free public transportation would help "provide low-income workers, families, seniors, and individuals with disabilities with improved access to jobs, education, medical care, and other critical services." Markey and Pressley reintroduced the bill in April 2023.

== Personal life ==
Since 1988, Markey has been married to Susan Blumenthal, who served as Deputy Assistant Secretary of Health and Human Services for Women's Health and held the rank of rear admiral as Assistant U.S. Surgeon General. From 2005 to 2017, he was a contributing writer for The Huffington Post. He was one of several politicians who had a cameo role in the 2003 film Gods and Generals, in which he played an Irish Brigade officer.

Markey received an Honorary Doctor of Laws from Tufts University in May 2019.

== Notes ==
U.S. House of Representatives
Preceded by Torbert Macdonald	Member of the U.S. House of Representatives from Massachusetts's 7th congressional district 1976–2013	Succeeded by Mike Capuano
Preceded by Niki Tsongas	Member of the U.S. House of Representatives from Massachusetts's 5th congressional district 2013	Succeeded by Katherine Clark
New office	Chair of the House Global Warming Committee; 2007–2011	Position abolished
Preceded by Doc Hastings	Ranking Member of the House Natural Resources Committee; 2011–2013	Succeeded by Peter DeFazio
Party political offices
Preceded by John Kerry	Democratic nominee for U.S. Senator from Massachusetts (Class 2); 2013, 2014, 2020, 2026	Most recent
U.S. Senate
Preceded by Mo Cowan	United States Senator (Class 2) from Massachusetts; 2013–present Served alongside: Elizabeth Warren	Incumbent
Preceded by Joni Ernst	Ranking Member of the Senate Small Business Committee; 2025–present	Incumbent
U.S. order of precedence (ceremonial)
Preceded by Mazie Hirono	Order of precedence of the United States as United States Senator	Succeeded by Cory Booker
Preceded by Deb Fischer	United States senators by seniority 44th	Succeeded by Cory Booker
