= William R. Callahan (state representative) =

American politician

Member of the Massachusetts House of Representatives from the 16th Middlesex district
- In office January 6, 1971 – January 3, 1973
- Preceded by: Edward M. Flanagan
- Succeeded by: Ed Markey

Personal details
- Born: April 27, 1925 Malden, Massachusetts
- Died: January 1976 (aged 50) Malden, Massachusetts
- Party: Democratic

William R. Callahan (April 27, 1925 – January 1976) was a Democratic member of the Massachusetts House of Representatives. He was a Malden resident who represented the 16th Middlesex district for one term, from 1971 to 1973. Before serving in the state legislature, he was a member of the Malden Common Council for two years and the Malden City Council for 14 years. He was a member of multiple organizations, including the Knights of Columbus and the Ancient Order of Hibernians.
