= Massachusetts House of Representatives' 30th Middlesex district =

American legislative district

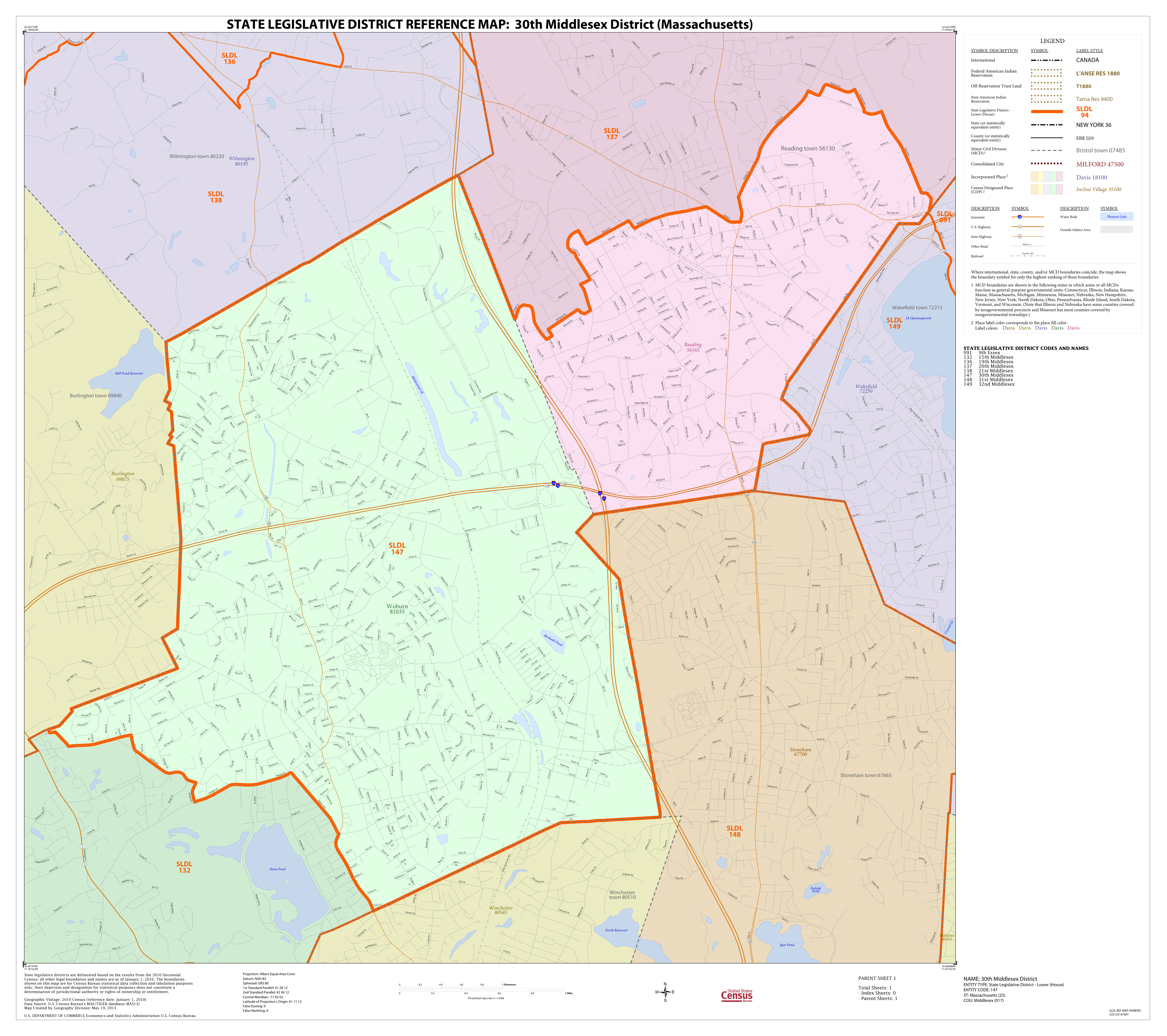
Map of Massachusetts House of Representatives' 30th Middlesex district, based on the 2010 United States census.

Massachusetts House of Representatives' 30th Middlesex district in the United States is one of 160 legislative districts included in the lower house of the Massachusetts General Court. It covers parts of Reading and Woburn in Middlesex County. Since 2019, Richard M. Haggerty of the Democratic Party has represented the district.

The current district geographic boundary overlaps with those of the Massachusetts Senate's 4th Middlesex and 5th Middlesex districts.

== Representatives ==
- Carol A. Donovan, 2003–2005
- Patrick Natale
- James J. Dwyer
- Richard M. Haggerty, 2019–present

== See also ==
- List of Massachusetts House of Representatives elections
- List of Massachusetts General Courts
- List of former districts of the Massachusetts House of Representatives

== Gallery ==
Portraits of legislators

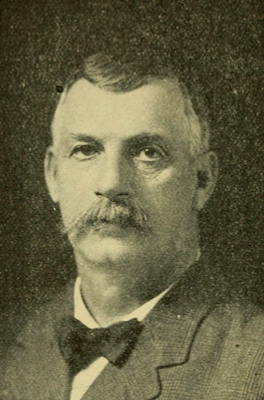
Joseph Wellington

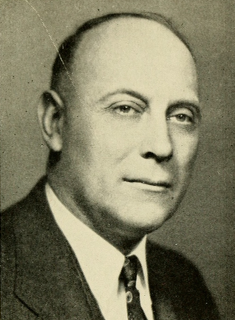
Earle Tyler

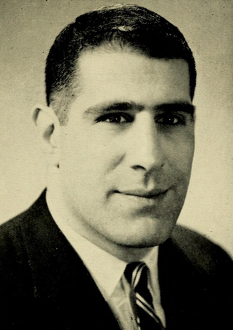
Charles Ohanian

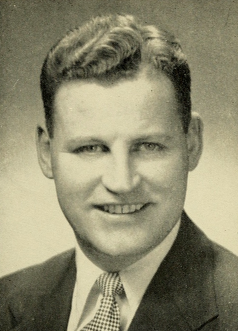
Paul Menton

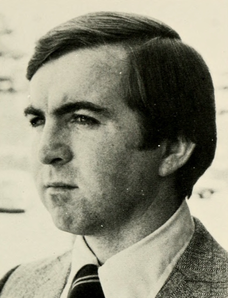
Paul Means

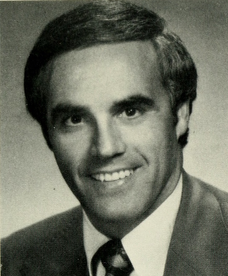
Vincent Joseph Piro

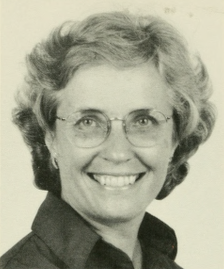
Patricia Jehlen

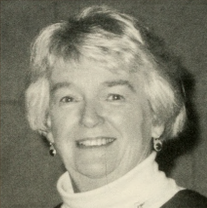
Carol Donovan

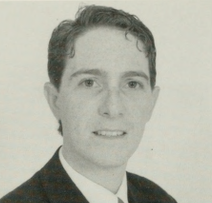
Patrick Natale
