= Hutchins & French =

American architectural firm

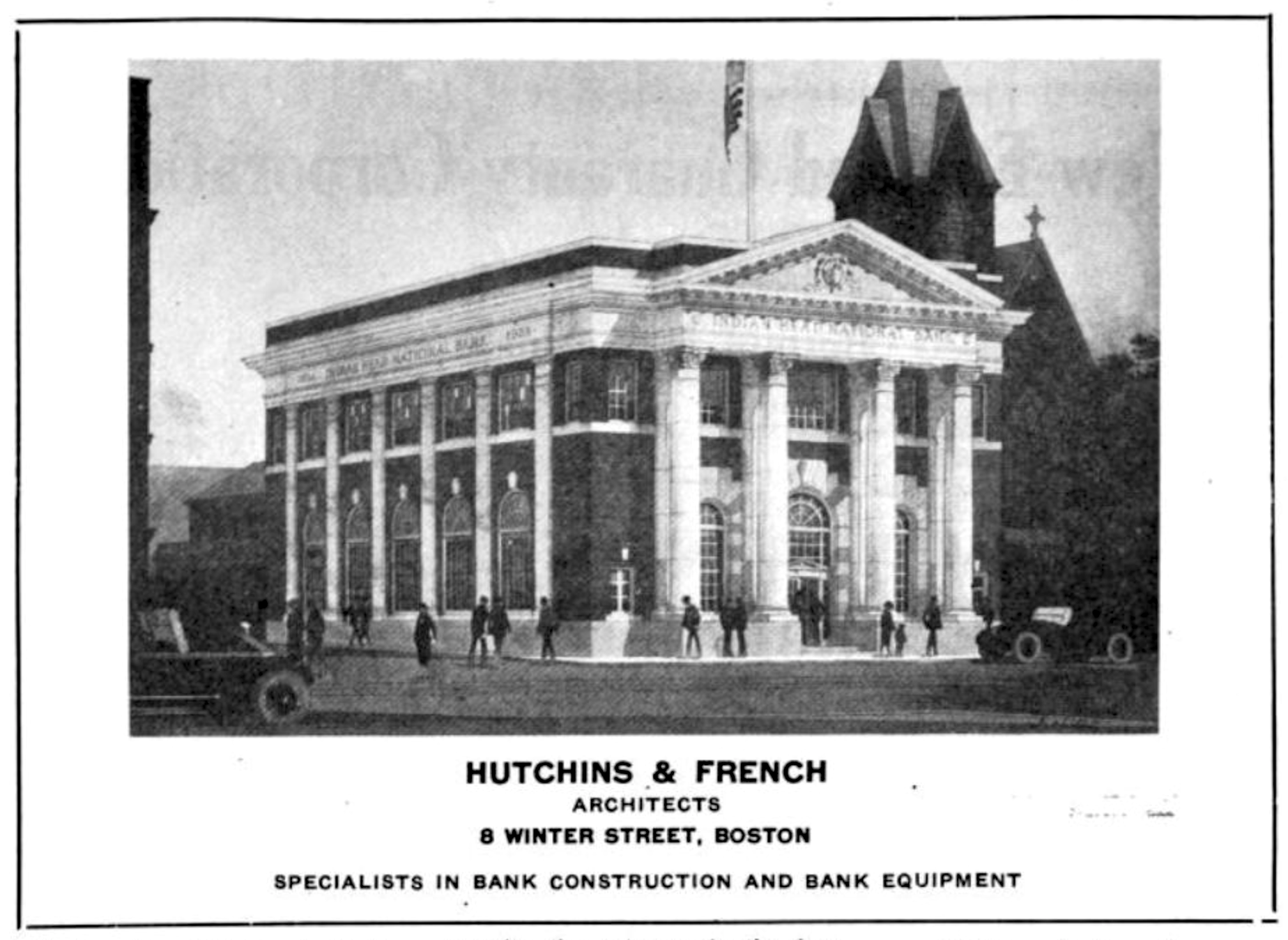
- A 1924 advertisement for Hutchins & French, featuring the new building of the Indian Head National Bank in Nashua, New Hampshire, typical of the firm's bank buildings.

Practice information
- Founders: Franklin H. Hutchins; Arthur E. French
- Founded: 1910
- Dissolved: 1989
- Location: Boston

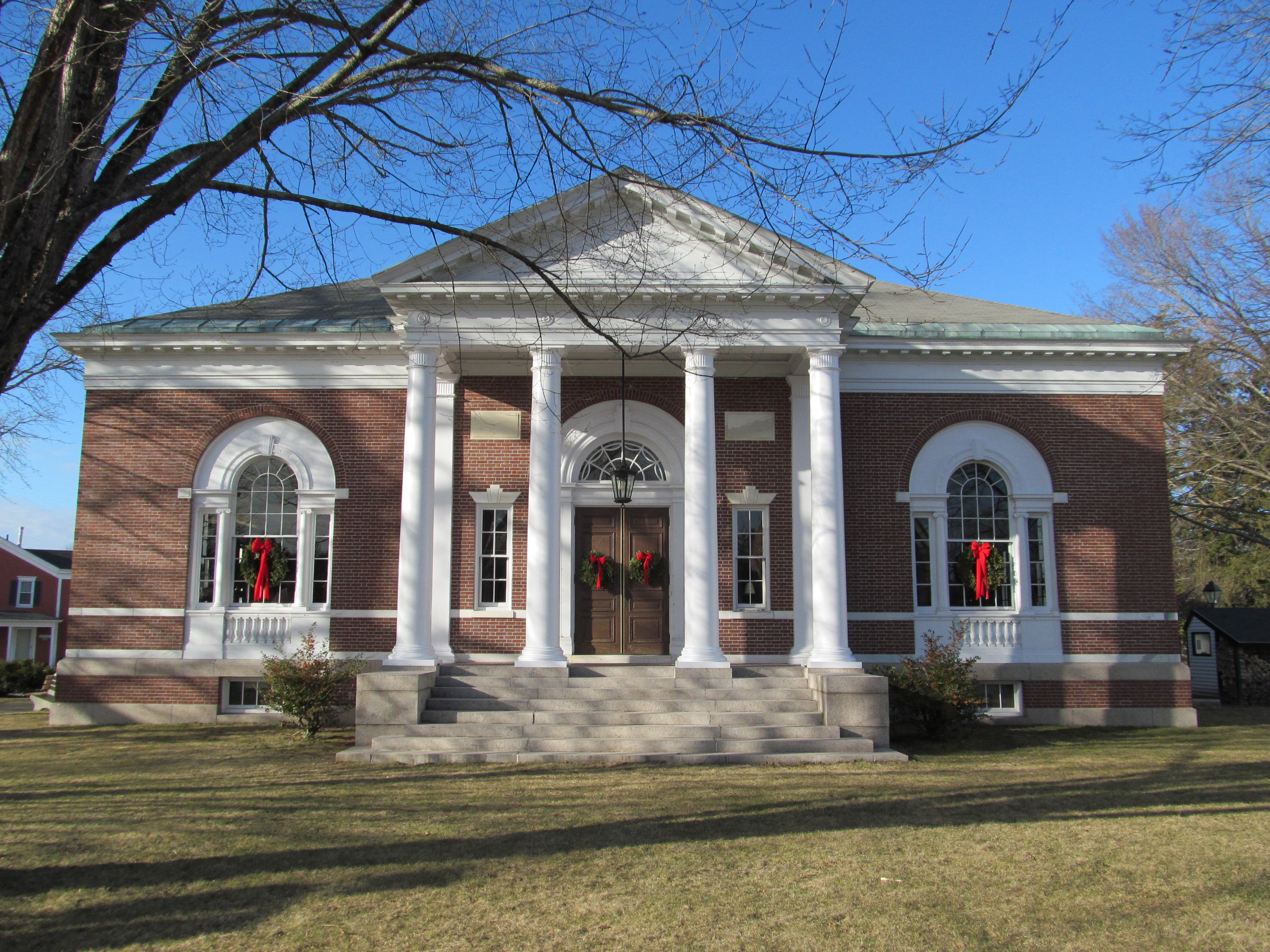
The Kennebunk Free Library in Kennebunk, Maine, designed by Hutchins in the Colonial Revival style and completed in 1907.

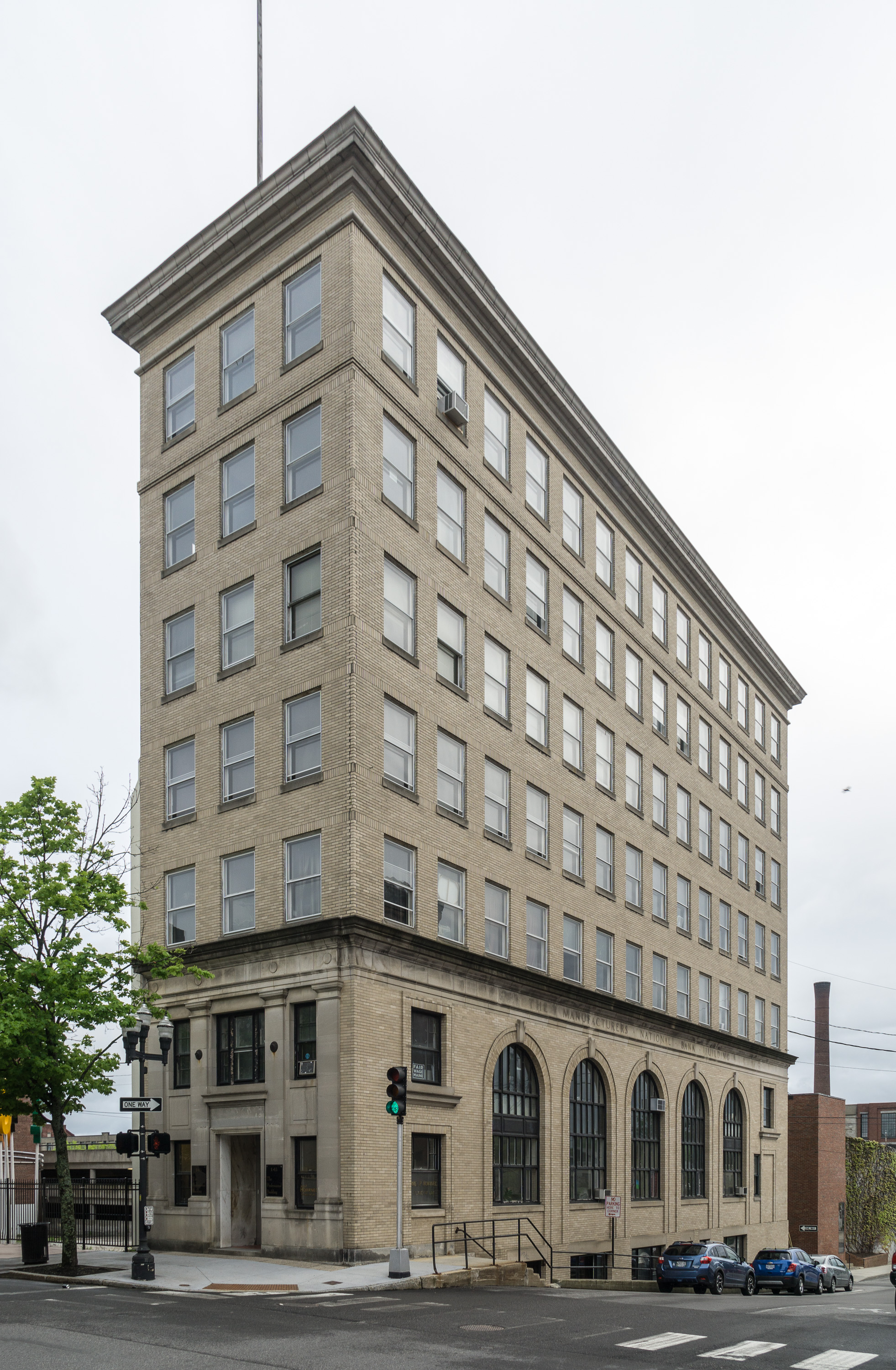
The Manufacturer's National Bank Building in Lewiston, Maine, designed by Hutchins & French in the Neoclassical style and completed in 1914.

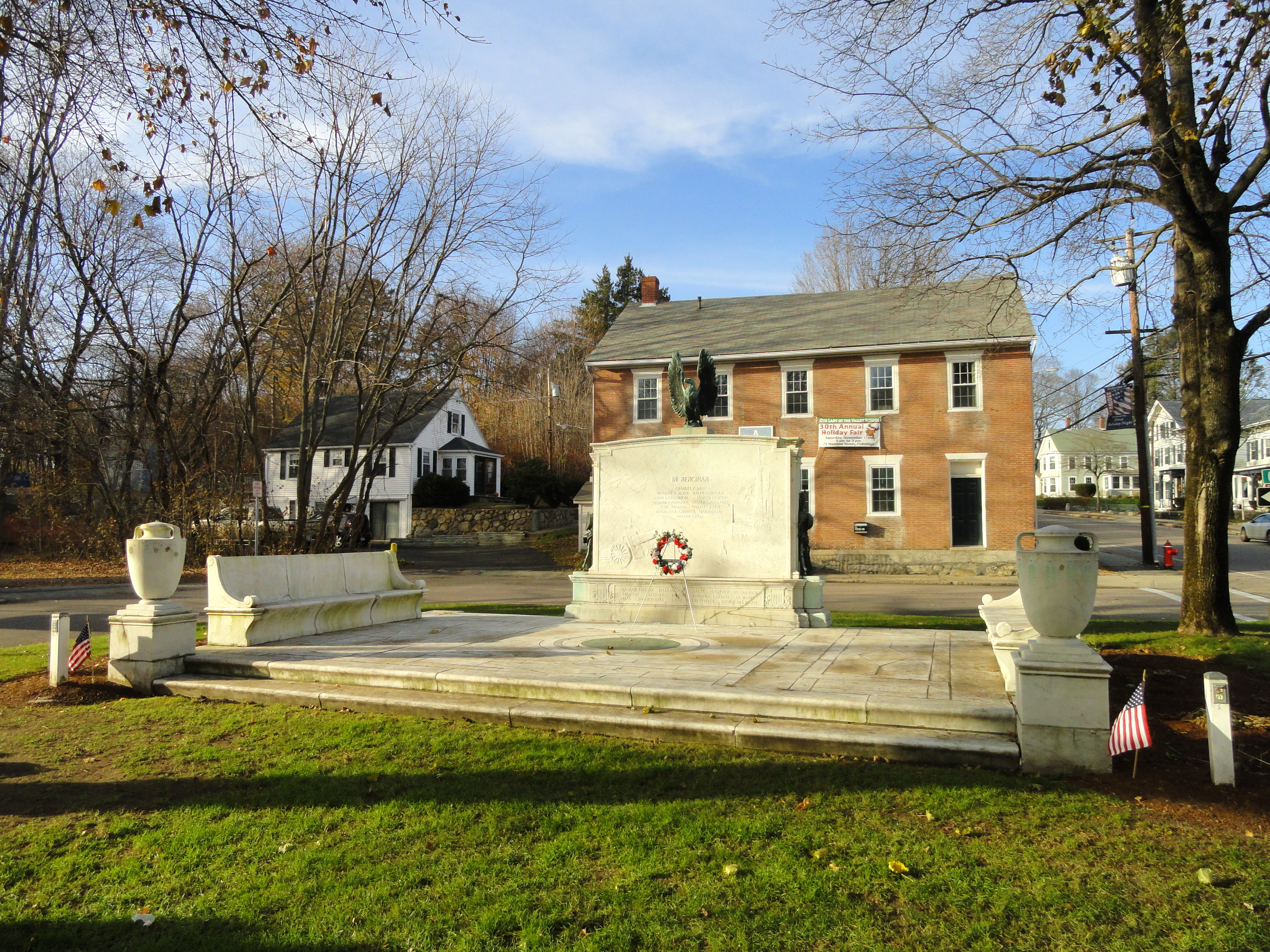
The World War I Memorial in Uxbridge, designed by Hutchins & French in the Neoclassical style and completed in 1921.

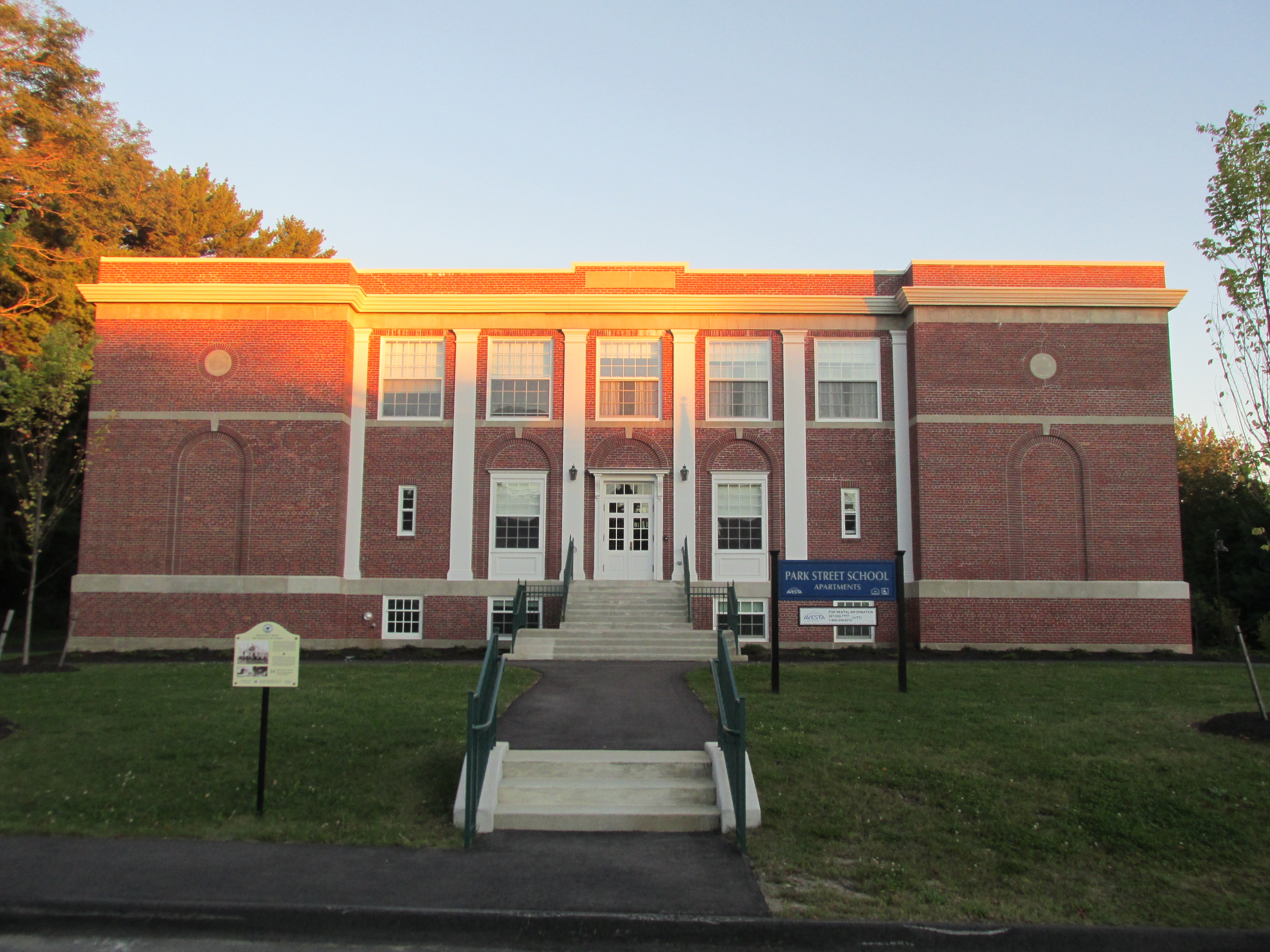
The Old Kennebunk High School, designed by Hutchins & French in the Colonial Revival style and completed in 1923.

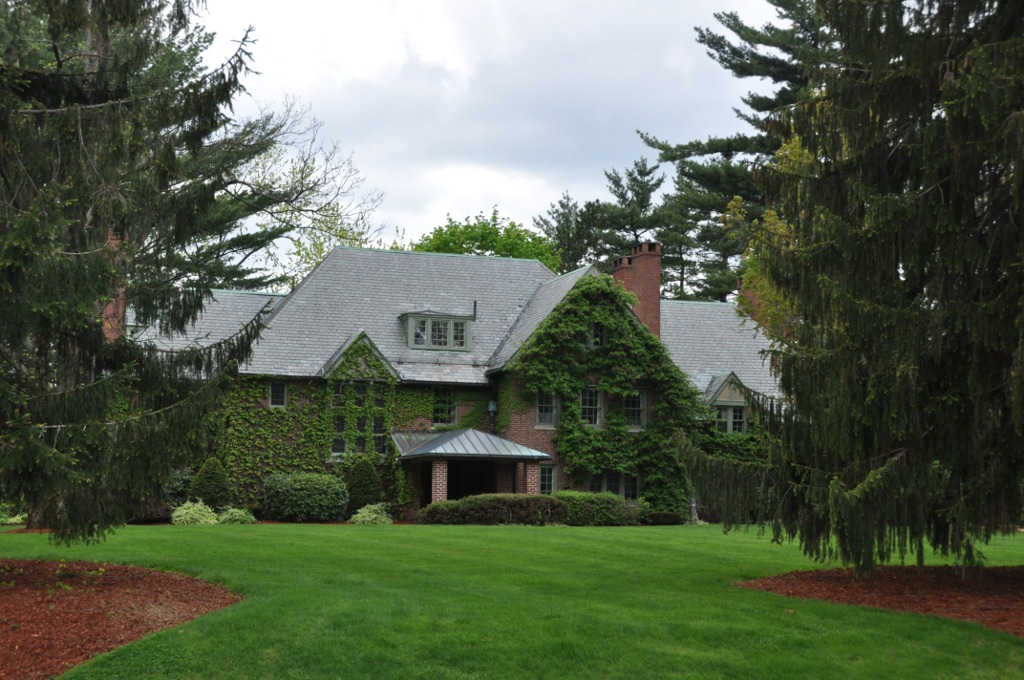
The William Parker Straw House in Manchester, New Hampshire, designed by Hutchins & French in the Tudor Revival style and completed in 1923.

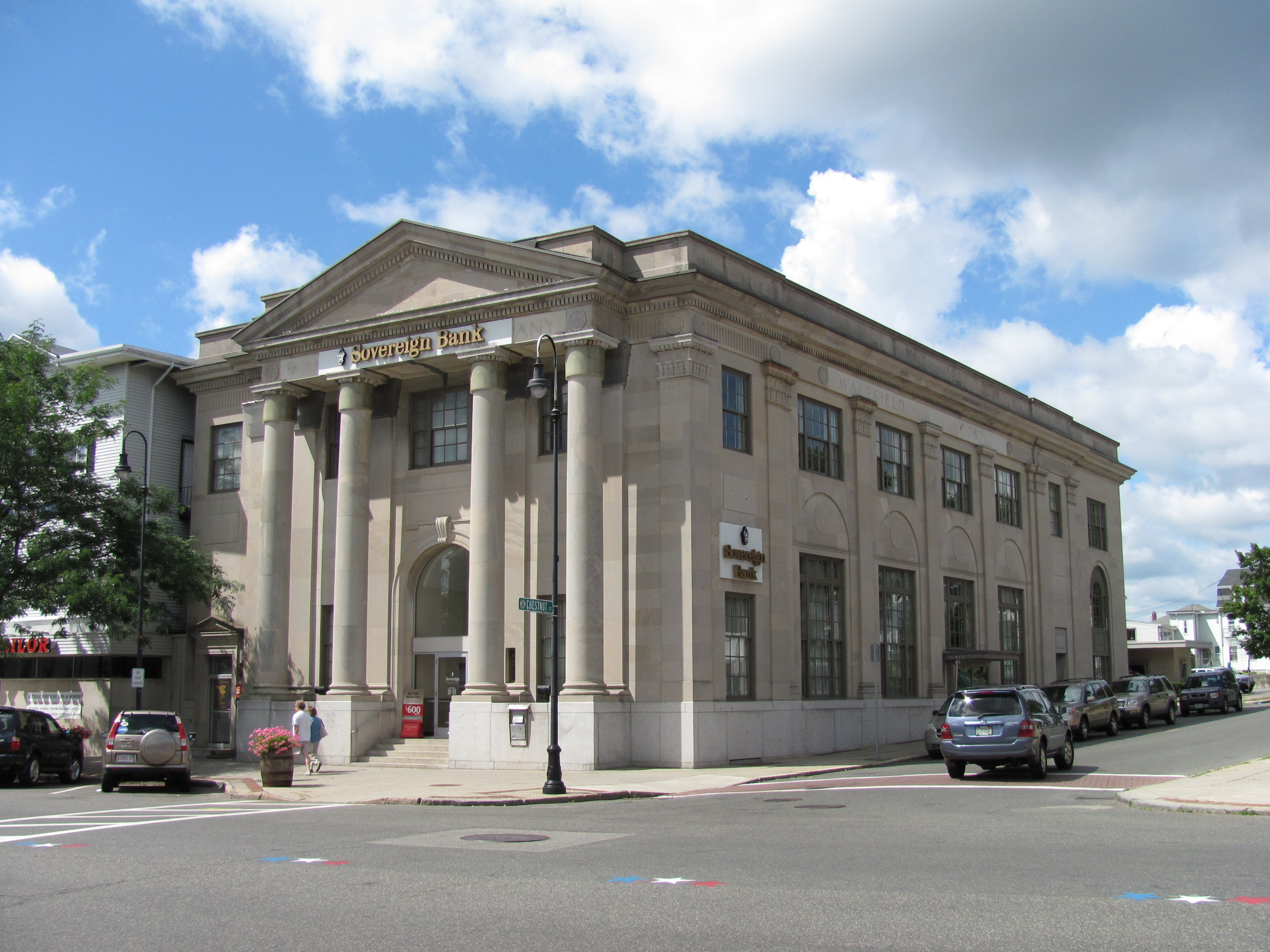
The Wakefield Trust Company Building in Wakefield, designed by Hutchins & French in the Neoclassical style and completed in 1924.

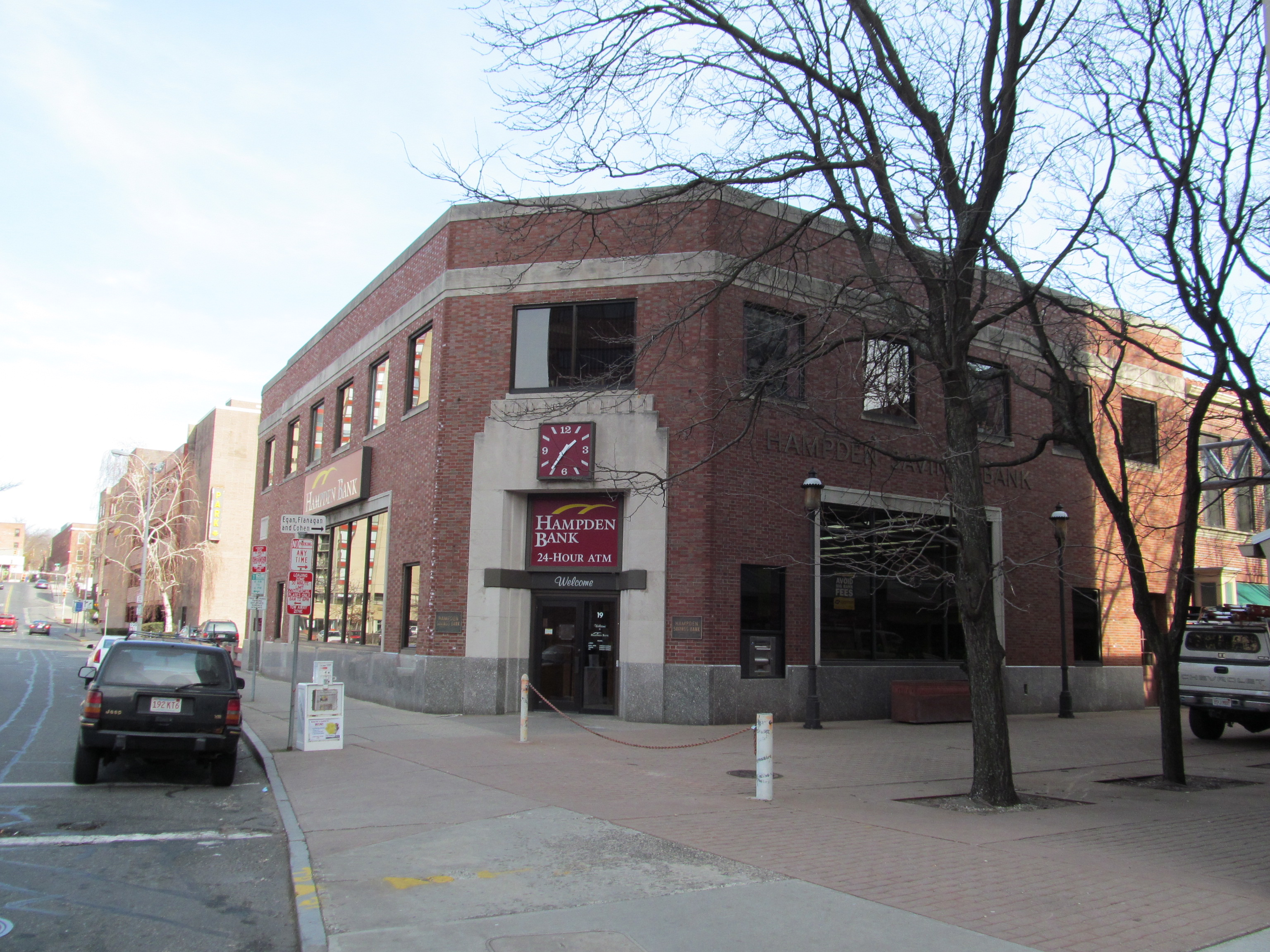
The Hampden Savings Bank Building in Springfield, designed by Hutchins & French in the Moderne style and completed in 1950.

Hutchins & French was an American architectural firm based in Boston. It was established in 1910 as the partnership of architects Franklin H. Hutchins and Arthur E. French. The firm specialized in the design of bank and school buildings.

== Firm history ==
Hutchins & French was formed in Boston in 1910 by architects Franklin H. Hutchins and Arthur E. French, who had met while employed in the office of Shepley, Rutan & Coolidge. They quickly developed a specialty in the design of bank and school buildings. In 1914, increasing work in northern New England allowed them to open a branch office in Manchester, New Hampshire, which operated until the mid-to-late 1920s. After the deaths of French in 1929 and Hutchins in 1934, the firm was managed by partners Francis Whitten, who joined the office in 1920, and Evander French, French's son, who had joined in 1927. Evander French died in 1960, and Gordon C. Mallar, who had also joined the firm in 1927, became a partner. Whitten and Mallar retired in the 1970s, and the firm was continued by the surviving partner, Sam G. Gountanis. Gountanis died in 1989.

== Legacy ==
Cleveland architect Philip Lindsley Small worked for the firm in 1914. His work includes Karamu House (1949) and the Huntington Museum of Art (1952).

At least five buildings designed by Hutchins & French have been listed on the United States National Register of Historic Places, and others contribute to listed historic districts.

== Founders ==
=== Franklin H. Hutchins ===
Franklin Henry Hutchins (1871 – February 14, 1934) was born in Boston. He worked in the offices of Shepley, Rutan & Coolidge and Parker, Thomas & Rice. Prior to establishing Hutchins & French he had also designed the Kennebunk Free Library in his mother's hometown of Kennebunk, Maine, which was completed in 1907. He was senior partner of the firm of Hutchins & French until his death.

Hutchins never married. He died at home in Boston at the age of 63.

=== Arthur E. French ===
Arthur Eugene French (1876 – February 26, 1929) was born in Wayland, Massachusetts, and was raised in Weston. He was trained as an in architect in the office of Cabot, Everett & Mead, and also worked for Shepley, Rutan & Coolidge for three years.

French and his wife, Charlotte, had four children, two sons and two daughters. He died at home in Winchester at the age of 53.

== Architectural works ==
- 1913 – Amoskeag Bank Building, 875 Elm St, Manchester, New Hampshire
- 1914 – Blackstone National Bank Building, 25 N Main St, Uxbridge, Massachusetts
  - A contributing resource to the NRHP-listed Uxbridge Common District.
- 1914 – Manufacturer's National Bank Building, 145 Lisbon St, Lewiston, Maine
  - NRHP-listed, also a contributing resource to the NRHP-listed Lewiston Commercial Historic District.
- 1915 – Barton's Department Store, 849 Elm St, Manchester, New Hampshire
  - Demolished.
- 1915 – Haverhill National Bank Building, 191 Merrimack St, Haverhill, Massachusetts
  - A contributing resource to the NRHP-listed Washington Street Shoe District.
- 1918 – Dorchester Trust Company Building, 555 Columbia Rd, Dorchester, Boston
  - A contributing resource to the NRHP-listed Uphams Corner Historic District.
- 1921 – World War I Memorial, Uxbridge Common, Uxbridge, Massachusetts
  - A contributing resource to the NRHP-listed Uxbridge Common District.
- 1922 – Manufacturers' National Bank Building, 67 N Washington St, North Attleborough, Massachusetts
  - A contributing resource to the NRHP-listed North Attleborough Town Center Historic District.
- 1923 – Indian Head National Bank Building, 146 Main St, Nashua, New Hampshire
- 1923 – Kennebunk High School, 14 Park St, Kennebunk, Maine
  - NRHP-listed.
- 1923 – William Parker Straw House, 282 N River Rd, Manchester, New Hampshire
  - NRHP-listed.
- 1924 – Fred N. Smith house, 417 Edgewater Dr, Mishawaka, Indiana
  - Built for the cashier of the First National Bank, for which Hutchins & French completed a bank in 1925.
- 1924 – Union National Bank Building, 61 Merrimack St, Lowell, Massachusetts
- 1924 – Wakefield Trust Company Building, 371 Main St, Wakefield, Massachusetts
  - NRHP-listed.
- 1925 – First National Bank Building, 101 Lincolnway E, Mishawaka, Indiana
- 1925 – First National Bank Building, 545 Pleasant St, New Bedford, Massachusetts
  - A contributing resource to the NRHP-listed Central New Bedford Historic District.
- 1925 – First National Bank Building, 21 Grove St, Peterborough, New Hampshire
- 1926 – Crawford Memorial United Methodist Church, 34 Dix St, Winchester, Massachusetts
- 1926 – Whittemore Elementary School, 30 Parmenter Rd, Waltham, Massachusetts
- 1927 – Solomon Agoos house, 62 Beech Rd, Brookline, Massachusetts
  - A contributing resource to the NRHP-listed Longwood Historic District.
- 1927 – Everett National Bank Building, 457-459 Broadway, Everett, Massachusetts
- 1927 – Wakefield Trust Company Building, 336 Main St, Wakefield, Rhode Island
  - A contributing resource to the NRHP-listed Wakefield Historic District.
- 1928 – Centreville Bank Building, 1218 Main St, West Warwick, Rhode Island
- 1928 – Keene National Bank Building, 20 Central Sq, Keene, New Hampshire
- 1928 – Masonic Building, 46 S Washington St, North Attleborough, Massachusetts
  - A contributing resource to the NRHP-listed North Attleborough Town Center Historic District.
- 1928 – Plimpton Hall, Tilton School, Tilton, New Hampshire
- 1929 – Kennebunk Savings Bank Building, 104 Main St, Kennebunk, Maine
- 1929 – Medford Savings Bank Building, Medford, Massachusetts
- 1929 – State Theatre, 1118 Elm St, Manchester, New Hampshire
  - Demolished.
- 1930 – Service Building, 128 Merchants Row, Rutland, Vermont
  - A contributing resource to the NRHP-listed Rutland Downtown Historic District.
- 1931 – Gleason School, 160 Playstead Rd, Medford, Massachusetts
- 1932 – James A. Hervey School (former), 120 Sharon St, Medford, Massachusetts
- 1932 – Quincy School additions, 94 Newbury Ave, Quincy, Massachusetts
  - NRHP-listed.
- 1948 – Ludlow Savings Bank Building, 33 Center St, Ludlow, Massachusetts
- 1949 – Natick Federal Savings Building, 49 Main St, Natick, Massachusetts
- 1949 – Parkhurst School, 40 Samoset Rd, Winchester, Massachusetts
- 1950 – First National Bank Building, 170 Commercial St, Provincetown, Massachusetts
- 1950 – Hampden Savings Bank Building, 19 Harrison Ave, Springfield, Massachusetts
- 1955 – Merrimack Mutual Fire Insurance Company, 305 N Main St, Andover, Massachusetts
- 1956 – Essex Savings Bank Building, 290-296 Essex St, Lawrence, Massachusetts
- 1957 – Central Savings Bank, 50 Central St, Lowell, Massachusetts
- 1960 – Vermont National and Savings Bank Building, 100 Main St, Brattleboro, Vermont
- 1961 – Winter Hill Federal Savings Bank Building, 342 Broadway, Somerville, Massachusetts
- 1962 – Greenfield Savings Bank Building, 400 Main St, Greenfield, Massachusetts
- 1963 – Masonic Temple (former), 47 Adams Ave, Saugus, Massachusetts
- 1969 – Braintree Cooperative Bank Building, 1010 Washington St, Braintree, Massachusetts
- 1976 – Great Meadow Village, 23 Beach Rd, Salisbury, Massachusetts
