= Manufacturers Bank (disambiguation) =

Manufacturers Bank is an American banking subsidiary of the Japanese Sumitomo Mitsui Banking Corporation.

Manufacturers Bank may also refer to:

- Manufacturers Hanover Corporation, a defunct bank headquartered in New York City
- Manufacturer's National Bank, a defunct bank and extant building in Lewiston, Maine
- Manufacturers National Corporation, a defunct bank in Michigan which merged with Comerica Bank in 1992
- Manufacturers and Traders Trust Company, the full name of M&T Bank
