= Quincy School =

- U.S. National Register of Historic Places
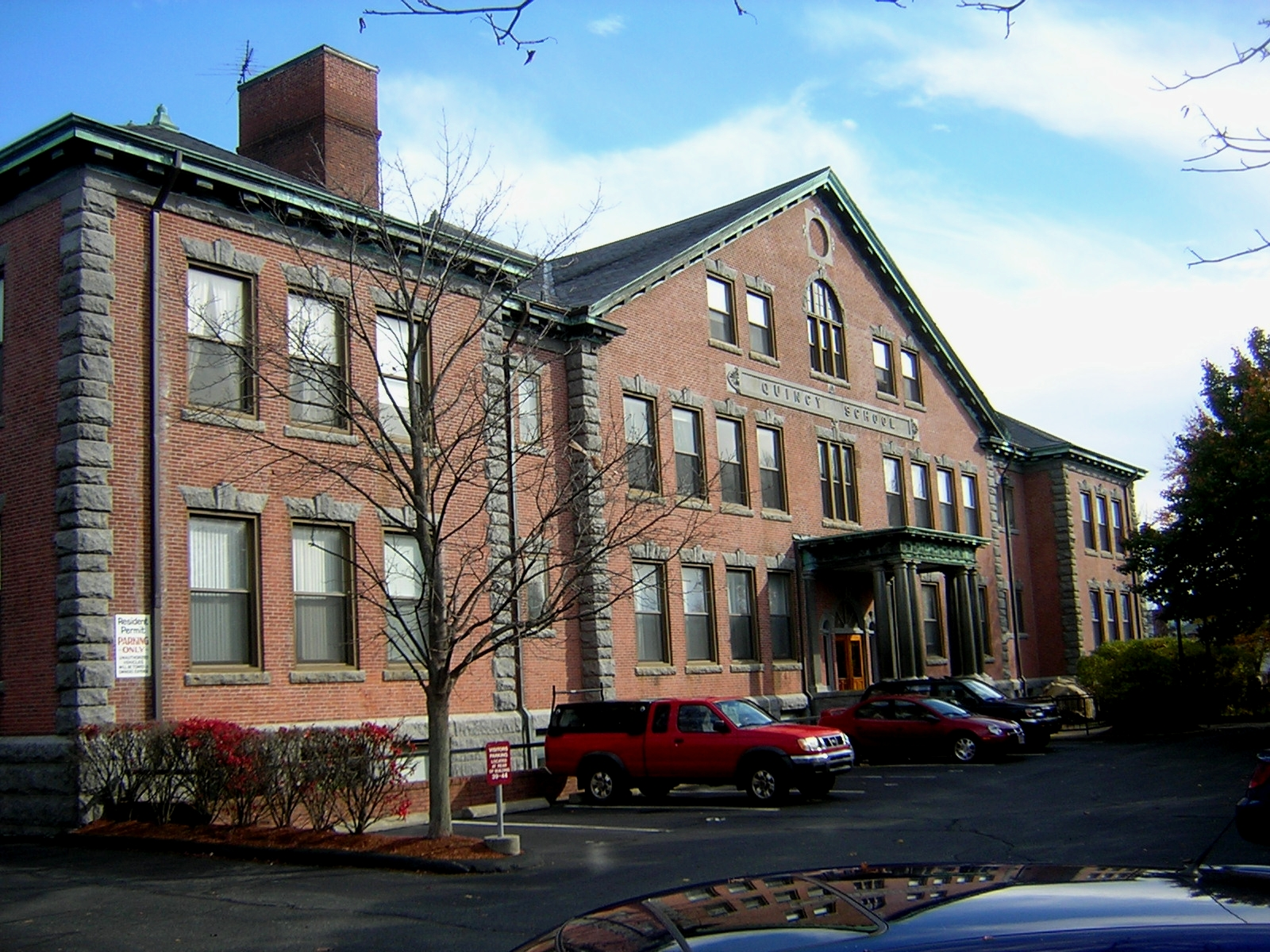

- Location within Massachusetts Location within the United States
- Location: 94 Newbury Ave., Quincy, Massachusetts
- Coordinates: 42°16′50″N 71°1′43″W
- Area: 1.3 acres (0.53 ha)
- Built: 1906
- Architect: Hurd & Gore, Hutchins & French
- Architectural style: Colonial Revival
- NRHP reference No.: 83000599
- Added to NRHP: June 23, 1983

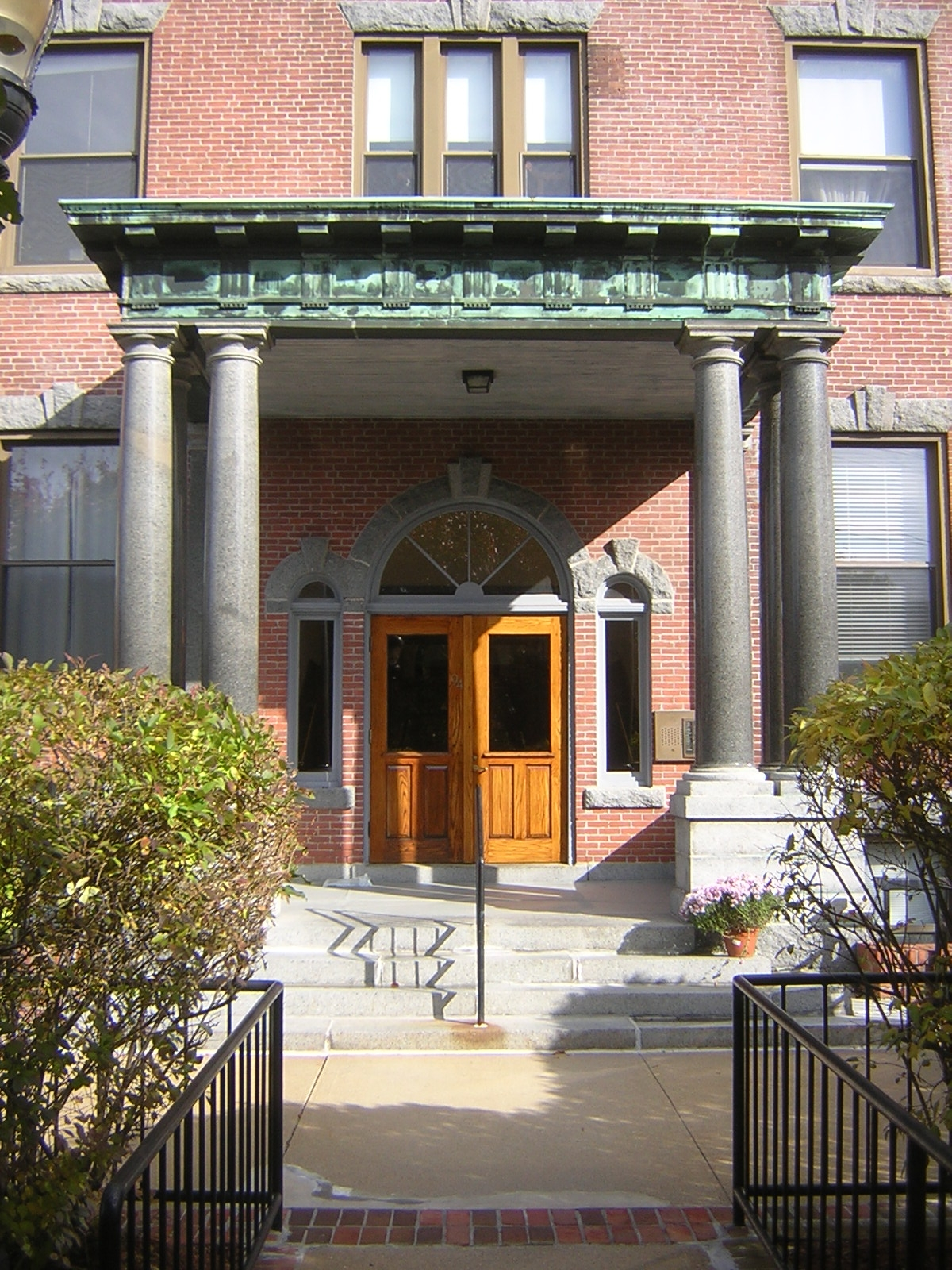

Quincy School is a historic school building at 94 Newbury Avenue in Quincy, Massachusetts. The two-story brick building was built in 1906 and enlarged in 1932; its original design was by Hurd & Gore, and the addition was by Hutchins & French. A longtime elementary school, it closed in 1981 following city cutbacks in the wake of Proposition 2 1/2, and was subsequently sold to private developers for conversion to condominiums.

The building was listed on the National Register of Historic Places in 1983.

== See also ==
- National Register of Historic Places listings in Quincy, Massachusetts
