= William Parker Straw House =

Historic house in New Hampshire, United States

- U.S. National Register of Historic Places
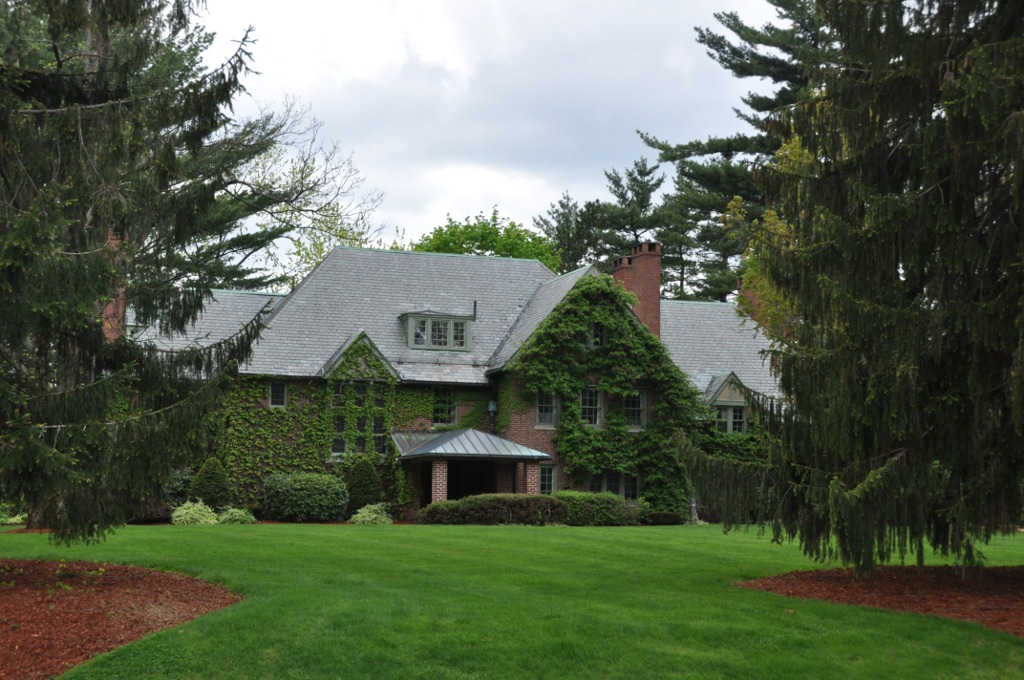

- Location within New Hampshire Location within the United States
- Location: 282 N. River Rd., Manchester, New Hampshire
- Coordinates: 43°0′26″N 71°28′9″W
- Area: 1.5 acres (0.61 ha)
- Built: 1923
- Built by: J. H. Bogart
- Architect: Hutchins & French
- Architectural style: Tudor Revival
- NRHP reference No.: 87002068
- Added to NRHP: December 8, 1987

The William Parker Straw House is a historic house at 282 North River Road in Manchester, New Hampshire. It was built in 1923 for William Parker Straw, a leading executive of the Amoskeag Manufacturing Company and president of the Amoskeag Bank, and is the city's finest example of Tudor Revival architecture. It was listed on the National Register of Historic Places in 1987.

== Description and history ==
The William Parker Straw House is located north of downtown Manchester, on the west side of North River Road opposite its junction with Monroe Street. It is a 2½-story structure, built with a wooden frame and finished in red brick. It is covered by a tall hipped roof, with hipped wings telescoping to the sides. A gabled ell projects forward from the right side of the central block, and a single-story portico shelters the entrance immediately to its left. Dormers are finished in stuccoed half-timbering typical of the Tudor Revival style, and diamond-pane casement windows, another element of the style, are widely used, although some have been replaced by modern sash windows.

Designed by the Boston firm of Hutchins & French and completed in 1923, it is Manchester's finest period Tudor Revival house. It was built for William Parker Straw, the then-principal executive on site of the Amoskeag Manufacturing Company, the city's largest employer. After the death of Straw and his wife in the 1950s, the house was converted to medical offices, and later to law offices.

== See also ==
- National Register of Historic Places listings in Hillsborough County, New Hampshire
