= Right There (film) =

- Promotional film poster
- Directed by: Nathan Suher
- Screenplay by: Nathan Suher; Gregory Capello
- Story by: Ian Taylor
- Starring: Ryan Hanley; Lauren A. Kennedy; Andre Boudreau; Alexandra Cipolla
- Cinematography: Jill Poisson
- Edited by: Chris Esper
- Music by: Kevin Keough
- Distributed by: IM Filmworks
- Release date: September 18, 2013
- Running time: 10 minutes
- Country: United States

Right There is a 2013 American short film written and directed by Nathan Suher. A romantic comedy about unrequited love, the film starred Ryan Hanley, Lauren Kennedy, Andre Boudreau, and Alexandra Cipolla. It was made as a modern-day silent film and intended by the filmmakers as a homage to the genre.

== Plot ==
The film follows a shy young man (Ryan Hanley) who one day falls in love with a woman (Lauren A. Kennedy) that he notices on a park bench eating her lunch. However, over the next 30 days, his attempts to gain her attention often meet in failure, due to awkward timing, bad luck and other humorous circumstances. A recurring theme in the film is the young man's daily contact with a nearby flower vendor (Andre Boudreau) who is usually the sole witness to his belated attempts to court the object of his affections.

== Cast ==
- Ryan Hanley as The Guy
- Lauren Kennedy as The Girl
- Andre Boudreau as The Flower Vendor
- Alexandra Cipolla as The Other Girl

== Production ==
Right There was the ninth film produced by IM Filmworks, a local production company owned by director-producers Nathan Suher and Gregory Capello, as part of a series of comedy shorts set in Southern New England. Like many of their previous films, Right There was based in Suher's hometown of North Attleboro, Massachusetts.

"This project came across my desk three years ago, and at the time it wasn't a fully thought out idea. I thought it needed to be changed so it had more of a dramatic structure and feel to it. Now it's a funny little story arc, and each day the stakes get higher and higher. It became an emotionally heavy story where it was originally a quirky little comedy video. It's got a lot of impact."

— Nathan Suher, September 2013

=== Writing ===
The idea for Right There was originally conceived by screenwriter Ian Taylor, a longtime writing collaborator, in 2010. The story was further developed by Suher and Capello, however, the project was put on hold as IM Filmworks was then in the process of filming several other short films. A fan of silent film stars Charlie Chaplin and Buster Keaton, the project personally appealed to Suher who wished to pay homage to the genre and "recapture this golden era of cinema". Suher also liked the idea that a silent film could be universally appreciated by non-English speaking audiences.

=== Casting ===
Keeping in mind the challenge for the cast to perform in a modern-day silent film, Suher and Capello took great care to look for physical acting ability during casting process. Ryan Hanley, a local actor, was the first to be cast in the lead role and appeared in Suher's Kickstarter video to raise funds for the film. Hanley had previously appeared in two other IM Filmworks comedy shorts, Professional Courtesy and Emergency Plan Omega, in 2011. In April 2013, Rosemary Pacheco of Motif reported that the two were "very close" to casting the lead actors but still needed to fill several minor roles. The filmmakers eventually chose Lauren A. Kennedy, a Brooklyn-based actress, as Hanley's co-star. The rest of the supporting cast were a mix of amateur and professional actors including Andrew Boudreau, Alexandra Cipolla, Chris Ferreira, Bernie Larrivee, Danielle Mayer, Kelly McCabe, and Chloe Suher. The film's score, which Suher felt was one of the most important elements in the film, was composed Kevin Keough, another IM Filmworks regular. The director later praised Keough's efforts which "really complement[ed] the overall mood of the film; it's beautiful, yet bittersweet".

=== Filming ===
The film was shot on an estimated $2,000 budget with a 20-member volunteer cast and crew. The majority of the film's budget was raised on Kickstarter during the spring of 2013. The 30-day campaign started on April 14, 2013, and was successful in raising $1,654, a little over its original $1,500 goal. The donated funds were specifically used to cover equipment rentals, location fees, filming permits, and food for the cast and crew. A week before the fundraiser was to end, an issue arose when the town of North Attleboro required IM Filmworks to pay for a police detail doubling the cost of the film's budget to nearly $2,200. Filming primarily took place in downtown North Attleboro, prominently featuring local businesses such as Mackie's, Bistro 45, and the Speed of Thought Playhouse, as well as additional locations in Mansfield and Rehoboth, Massachusetts on May 18–19, 2013. The historic Odd Fellows Building was among the downtown storefronts used in the film. It was one of the last-ever images captured on film before it burned down in January 2014. His directing style was influenced by the silent film-era and included filmmaking techniques commonly used during the period.

== Release ==
Right There made its world premiere on October 18, 2013, at the Speed of Thought Playhouse in North Attleboro, Massachusetts, one of the locations used in the film. Prior to the event, Suher was interviewed on North TV about the film. The premier party held at the venue included the first-ever screening of Suher's music video "Precious Time" for American Dreamers, featuring a live performance from the group, a question and answer session with the cast, and a silent auction. The event raised an estimated $1,000 allowing IM Filmworks to repay town officials for the police detail as well as providing additional revenue for marketing and film festival submissions. In addition, Suher, Ian Taylor, and several cast members were all interviewed on Frame by Frame discussing their experiences working on a silent film. The film was also screened at the Brooklyn Coffee Tea House in Providence, Rhode Island on November 7, 2013, and at the Somerville Theater in Somerville, Massachusetts on March 1, 2014. In the latter showing, Right There was part of a double-billing also featuring the 2013 thriller Normal directed by Richard Griffin. The original 8:00 pm opening sold out shortly after its official announcement with the theater adding two additional screenings. Suher was interviewed on ABC6 News that same day to promote the film's Boston premiere.

The film received a favorable review by Tom Lobascio of The Last Reel calling it "a great slice of life piece of film". Lobascio called the story "one that is relateable and familiar" to audiences and also complimented the film score and "top notch" performance of the cast. He was particularly impressed with the improv comedy skills of lead actor Ryan Hanley who "captures the silent spirit with perfection. His facial expressions say so much ... doing it all. His back and forth making faces at a little girl is very amusing indeed. The greats would no doubt be pleased".

Suher initially had hopes that it would be accepted to the upcoming 2014 Cannes and Sundance Film Festivals. In December 2014, however, IM Filmworks announced that the film was not selected by the Sundance organizers. Right There was subsequently entered into other competitions during the winter season including the Boston International Film Festival, Massachusetts Independent Film Festival, and the SXSW Film Festival. On April 26, 2014, Right There made its film festival debut at the 6th annual SENE Film, Music & Arts Festival in Providence, Rhode Island. It was screened at both the Cable Car Cinema and the historic Columbus Theater. Suher, who was in attendance with producer Lori Suher, was awarded "Best Regional Film". That same month, Suher was a guest on DiHard Radio where he discussed his early life and career, starting his first production company, and the making of Right There.

=== Accolades ===
Award	Subject	Nominee	Result
SENE Film, Music & Arts Festival	Best Regional Film	Right There	Won
SENE Film, Music & Arts Festival	Best Score – Honorable Mention	Right There	Won
Massachusetts Independent Film Festival	Best New England Film	Right There	Nominated
Shawna Shea Film Festival	Official Selection	Right There	
