= Adam Scanlon =

American politician

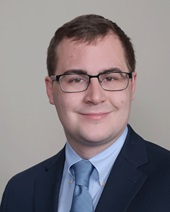
- Scanlon in 2021

Member of the Massachusetts House of Representatives from the 14th Bristol district
- Incumbent
- Assumed office January 6, 2021
- Preceded by: Elizabeth Poirier

North Attleborough Town Council
- In office 2019–2020

Member of North Attleborough School Committee
- In office 2017–2019

North Attleborough Town Meeting Member
- In office 2015–2019

Personal details
- Born: 1996 (age 29–30) Attleboro, Massachusetts
- Party: Democratic
- Education: Framingham State University
- Occupation: Legislator
- Website: officeofrepscanlon.com

Adam Scanlon is an American politician serving as a member of the Massachusetts House of Representatives. Since 2020 he has represented the 14th Bristol district, which includes all of North Attleborough and precincts in Mansfield and Attleboro.

== Personal life ==
Scanlon was raised in North Attleborough. He received a BA from Framingham State University and is pursuing a master's degree in Public Administration at Northeastern University. He is openly gay.

== Political career ==
Scanlon first entered local government as a member of the North Attleboro Town Meeting from 2015 to 2019. He also served on the North Attleborough School Committee from 2017 to 2019 and was a member of the North Attleboro Town Council from 2019 to 2020. In the 2020 election, Scanlon defeated fellow Town Councilor John Simmons to win the Massachusetts House of Representatives seat held by retiring incumbent Betty Poirier.

=== Committees ===
In the 2025-26 session, Scanlon sits on the following committees:

- House Committee on Post Audit and Oversight (Vice Chair)
- House Committee on Federal Funding, Policy and Accountability
- Joint Committee on Economic Development and Emerging Technologies
- Joint Committee on Emergency Preparedness and Management

== Electoral history ==
2024 Massachusetts 14th Bristol General Election
Party	Candidate	Votes	%
Democratic	Adam J. Scanlon	12,478	55.9
Republican	David Cannata	9,823	44.0
Write-in		4	0.0
Total votes		22,305	100.0

2024 Massachusetts 14th Bristol Democratic Primary
Party	Candidate	Votes	%
Democratic	Adam J. Scanlon	2,828	99.8
Write-in		5	0.2
Total votes		2,833	100.0

2022 Massachusetts 14th Bristol General Election
Party	Candidate	Votes	%
Democratic	Adam J. Scanlon	11,212	98.5
Write-in		169	1.5
Total votes		11,381	100.0

2022 Massachusetts 14th Bristol Democratic Primary
Party	Candidate	Votes	%
Democratic	Adam J. Scanlon	3,013	99.9
Write-in		2	0.1
Total votes		3,015	100.0

2020 Massachusetts 14th Bristol General Election
Party	Candidate	Votes	%
Democratic	Adam J. Scanlon	12,406	54.4
Republican	John D. Simmons	10,380	45.5
Write-in		12	0.1
Total votes		22,798	100.0

2020 Massachusetts 14th Bristol Democratic Primary
Party	Candidate	Votes	%
Democratic	Adam J. Scanlon	3,267	50.8
Democratic	Patrick Steven Reynolds	3,149	49.0
Write-in		9	0.1
Total votes		6,425	100.0

== See also ==
- 2025–2026 Massachusetts legislature
- 2023–2024 Massachusetts legislature
- 2021–2022 Massachusetts legislature
