= North Attleborough Town Center Historic District =

Historic district in Massachusetts, United States

- U.S. National Register of Historic Places
- U.S. Historic district
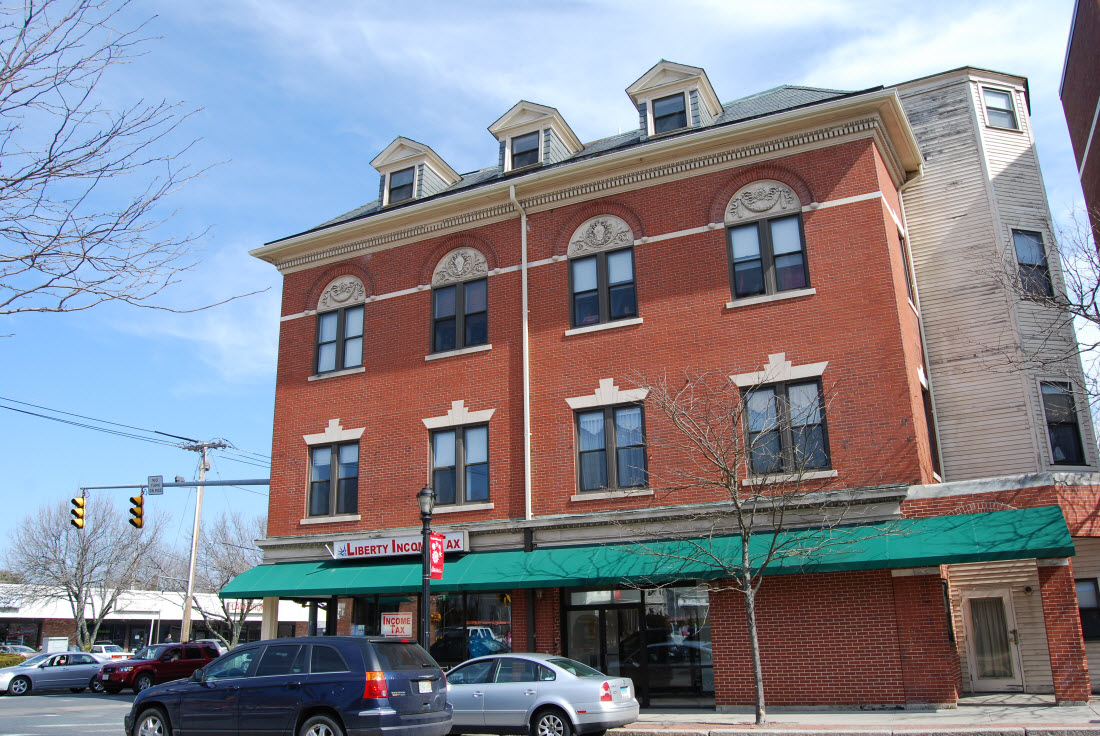
- South Washington Street

- Location within Massachusetts Location within the United States
- Location: North Attleborough, Massachusetts
- Coordinates: 41°58′59″N 71°20′0″W
- Built: 1780
- Architect: Multiple
- Architectural style: Colonial Revival, Classical Revival, Mixed (more Than 2 Styles From Different Periods)
- NRHP reference No.: 85003168
- Added to NRHP: December 20, 1985

The North Attleborough Town Center Historic District encompasses the most historic elements of the central business district of North Attleborough, Massachusetts. The area was developed between about 1860 and 1830 as a center serving the community and the surrounding jewelry manufacturing businesses for which the town was well known. The district, extending along Washington Street between Fisher Street and Bruce Avenue, was added to the National Register of Historic Places in 1985.

== Description and history ==
North Attleborough was settled in the 17th century, and was first incorporated as part of Attleboro in 1694. It was separated from Attleboro in 1887, at a time when it was already widely known as a center of the jewelry trade. That business, begun in the 1800, was mostly found in areas surrounding the town's central business district, along the Ten Mile River and its tributaries.

Attleboro's first town center, now known as Old Town, was located a few miles south of North Attleborough's town center. The development of industry led the present town center to take shape in the mid-19th century. A few surviving residences in the area (the oldest dating to c. 1780) are a reminder of the area's agrarian past. The area had a number of commercial buildings by the 1860s (some of which still stand), and growth was spurred by the arrival of a railroad branch in 1870. After separation from Attleboro in 1887, the new town built its library in 1894-95; it is a picturesque blend of architectural styles designed by Boston architect William Herbert McLean.

The historic district is essentially linear in character, extend along North and South Washington Streets, between Fisher Street in the north and Bruce Avenue in the south. The central blocks are characterized by predominantly brick commercial buildings, one to four stories in height, most built between 1890 and 1930. The district also includes one church, the Grace Episcopal Church; it is a 1930 Gothic Revival stone building, constructed after the previous church was destroyed by fire. Its most prominent residence is found at the northernmost boundary; known as the Loeb Estate, it is a Tudor Revival mansion built by and for James Munroe, a local builder responsible for construction of a number of the district's commercial buildings.

== See also ==
- National Register of Historic Places listings in Bristol County, Massachusetts
