= H. F. Barrows Manufacturing Company Building =

- H.F. Barrows Manufacturing Company Building
- U.S. National Register of Historic Places
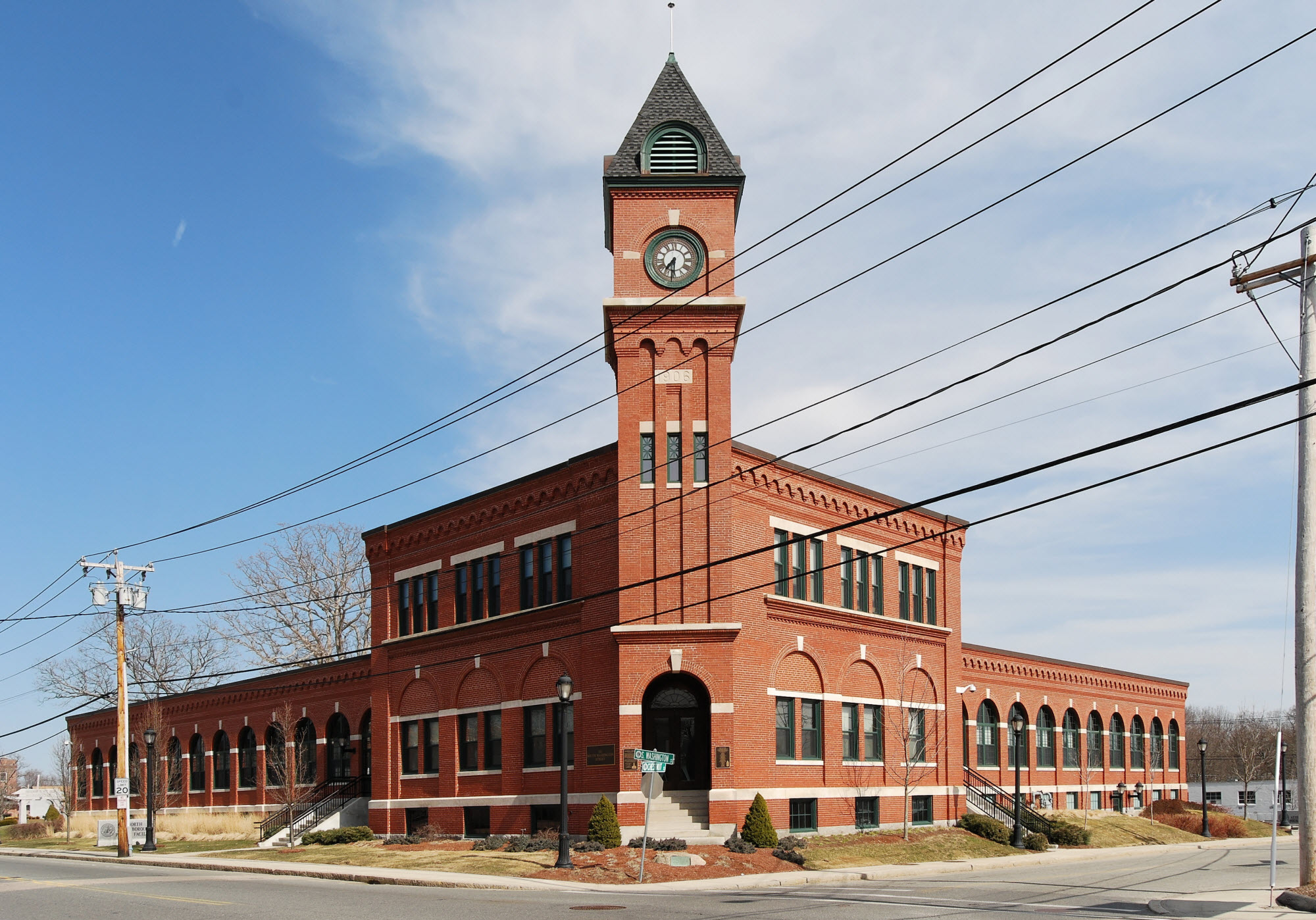
- 102 South Washington Street

- Location within Massachusetts Location within the United States
- Location: North Attleborough, Massachusetts
- Coordinates: 41°58′45″N 71°20′0″W
- Architectural style: Late Victorian
- NRHP reference No.: 01000907
- Added to NRHP: August 30, 2001

The H.F. Barrows Manufacturing Company Building, now the North Attleborough Police Station, is a historic industrial building in North Attleborough, Massachusetts. The elegant brick building was built in 1905–06, and was home for many years to one of the town's most successful jewelry businesses. It was listed on the National Register of Historic Places in 2001. Today the building serves as the headquarters for the North Attleborough Police Department.

== Description and history ==
The former Barrows factory is located at the northeast corner of South Washington Street and Chestnut Street, at the southern end of North Attleborough's downtown area. It is a two-story brick structure with granite trim, a clock tower placed prominently at the street corner, and single-story wings extending along the two streets, giving the building an overall L shape. The tower is set at an angle at the corner, and houses the main building entrance in a deeply-recessed round arch open vestibule. First-floor windows are generally set in recessed round-arch panels, while the second-floor windows of the central block are grouped in threes under extended granite lintels. The roofline is demarcated by brick corbelling on all parts of the building, a detail echoed in upper parts of the tower. The square tower has a Seth Thomas clock with four faces, and is capped by a pyramidal roof.

The town of Attleborough (from which North Attleborough was set off in 1887) has a history of jewelry manufacture dating to the late 18th century. The H.F. Barrows Company was founded in 1854 in Attleborough Falls by Henry Francis Barrows, Sr. The firm passed to his sons Henry, Jr. and Ira, who had this building erected in 1905–06. The firm was widely known for its gold chains, but it successfully diversified when watches with chains fell out of fashion after World War I. The company, no longer a private family business, moved to larger quarters in Lincoln, Rhode Island in 1999. The city purchased the building in 2000, and converted it for use as its main police station.

== See also ==
- National Register of Historic Places listings in Bristol County, Massachusetts
