= Old Kennebunk High School =

- Kennebunk High School
- U.S. National Register of Historic Places
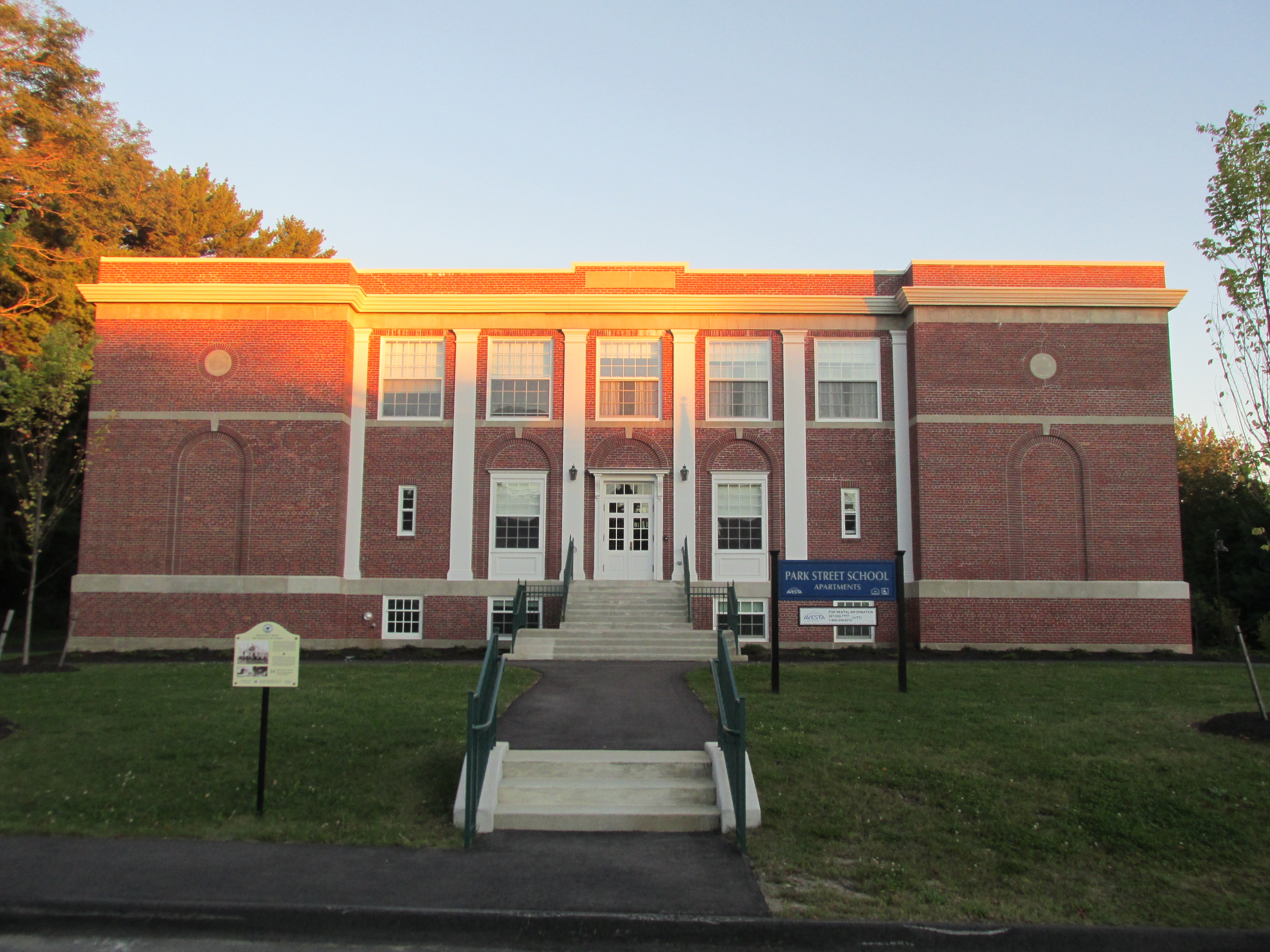

- Location within Maine Location within the United States
- Location: 14 Park St. Kennebunk, Maine
- Coordinates: 43°23′07″N 70°32′06″W
- Area: 3 acres (1.2 ha)
- Built: 1922
- Architect: Hutchins & French
- Architectural style: Colonial Revival
- NRHP reference No.: 11000584
- Added to NRHP: August 24, 2011

The Old Kennebunk High School, also known as the Park Street School, is an historic former school building at 14 Park Street in Kennebunk, Maine. Built in 1921 to a design by Hutchins & French of Boston, Massachusetts, it is historically significant for its role the town's education system, and architecturally as a fine example of a "modern" high school building of the period with Colonial Revival styling. It was listed on the National Register of Historic Places in 2011.

== Description and history ==
The Old Kennebunk High School is located on the southeast side of Park Street, roughly opposite its junction with Dane Street, on the south side of the village center of Kennebunk. It is a two-story brick building, with limestone trim. The main facade, facing the street, is seven bays wide, the outer two blind (windowless) facades of slightly projecting end wings. These end wings have a round-arch recess, filled with bricks at their centers on the first level, with a round limestone panel above on the second level. The central five bays are demarcated by pilasters, and have large sash windows on the second level. The outermost bays have small 2-over-2 windows at their center, and the next inner ones have sash windows with panels below. The original main entrance stands in the center bay, with a transom window and console hood above. Modern additions dating to 1954 and 1962 extend the original building to the rear.

The school was built in 1921–22, serving as the town's fourth high school, replacing a former private academy building (built 1833, purchased by the town in 1850), an Italianate combined grammar and high school built after the first was destroyed by fire in 1870, and a brick building from 1871 that was known as the Kennebunk High and Grammar School. This school was built to adhere to new state standards for schools, and to attract tuition-paying students from surrounding communities. The school design, by Hutchins and French of Boston, was awarded after a design competition. The school served the town has a high school until 1939, when a new high school was opened to address overcrowding. This school was then renamed the Park Street School, and housed elementary grades until its closure in 2004. It now serves as housing for older and disabled residents.

== See also ==
- National Register of Historic Places listings in York County, Maine
