= Kevin Poirier =

American politician

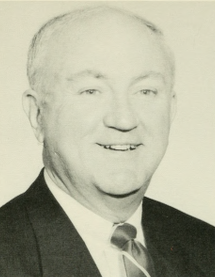
- Portrait of Kevin Poirier

Member of the Massachusetts House of Representatives from the 14th Bristol district
- In office 1979–1999
- Preceded by: Theodore J. Aleixo, Jr.
- Succeeded by: Elizabeth Poirier

Member of the Massachusetts House of Representatives from the 16th Bristol district
- In office 1977–1979
- Preceded by: Donald Bliss
- Succeeded by: District abolished

Personal details
- Born: July 7, 1940 (age 86) Providence, Rhode Island
- Party: Republican
- Spouse: Elizabeth Poirier
- Education: Bryant College
- Occupation: Politician

Kevin Poirier (born July 7, 1940, in Providence, Rhode Island) is an American politician who was a member of the Massachusetts House of Representatives from 1977 to 1999. From 1987 to 1990 he was the Assistant Minority Leader. Poirier resigned his seat in 1999 to become director of development at Sturdy Memorial Hospital. He was succeeded by his wife Elizabeth Poirier.
