= Old Town Historic District (North Attleborough, Massachusetts) =

Historic district in Massachusetts, United States

- U.S. National Register of Historic Places
- U.S. Historic district
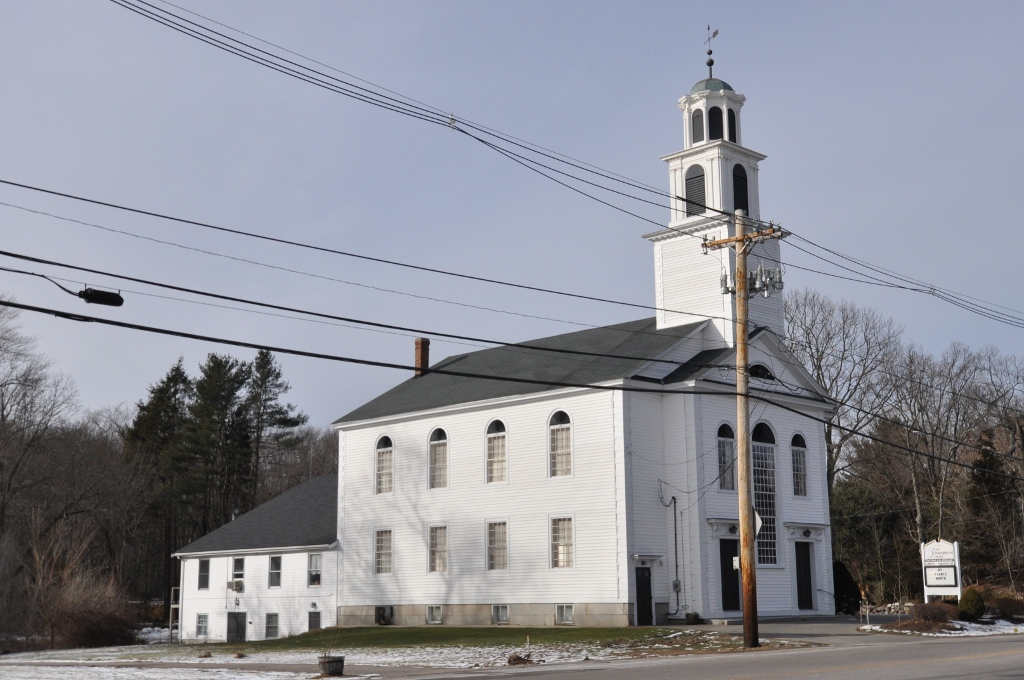
- The First Congregational Church

- Location within Massachusetts Location within the United States
- Location: North Attleborough, Massachusetts
- Coordinates: 41°56′40″N 71°20′24″W
- Built: 1828
- Architect: Walker, Ezra
- Architectural style: Late 19th And 20th Century Revivals, Greek Revival, Late Victorian
- NRHP reference No.: 91000599
- Added to NRHP: May 30, 1991

The Old Town Historic District is a historic district in North Attleborough, Massachusetts, which encompasses the historic early town center of Attleboro, which it was originally a part of. It was here that Attleboro's first church was built, and its militia training ground was laid out. The district retains 18th-century vestiges of this early history, and was largely bypassed by 19th-century industrialization. The district was added to the National Register of Historic Places in 1991.

== Description and history ==
In 1661 representatives of the Plymouth Colony purchased a large tract of land from the Wampanoags that includes present-day Attleboro and North Attleborough. By the 1690s the area had enough settlers to warrant incorporation, and Attleboro was incorporated in 1694. Land in the Old Town area was allocated for a church and minister, and the first church was built adjacent to the Bay Path (now Old Post Road) in 1711. A militia training ground and animal pound were also established nearby. A path, now Mt. Hope Street, eventually developed leading eastward toward what is now Attleboro center, another nexus of settlement. The Newell family became significant landowners in Old Town, and it through their efforts that the surviving powder magazine, a small circular brick building, was built in 1768. (The training ground, of which only archaeological remnants remain, lay between it and the Bay Path.)

The historic district encompasses the core of this early settlement area. It extends along Old Post Road, southeast of the junction of I-295 to Allen Street, as well as a short stretch of Mt. Hope Street east of Old Post Road. Its buildings include a variety of structures, most residential, that were built between the 18th and early 20th centuries. The area was largely bypassed by the industrialization that spurred the growth in importance of the centers of Attleboro and North Attleborough. Three houses within the district were built before 1800, one of them (the Stearns House at 692 Old Post Road) with a late 17th-century ell. The present church is a Greek Revival structure built in 1828, with a district school nearby that dates to 1840. A significant number of houses were built in the late 19th and early 20th century, when a streetcar line spurred suburban development in the area.

== See also ==
- National Register of Historic Places listings in Bristol County, Massachusetts
