= Attleborough Falls Historic District =

Historic district in Massachusetts, United States

- U.S. National Register of Historic Places
- U.S. Historic district
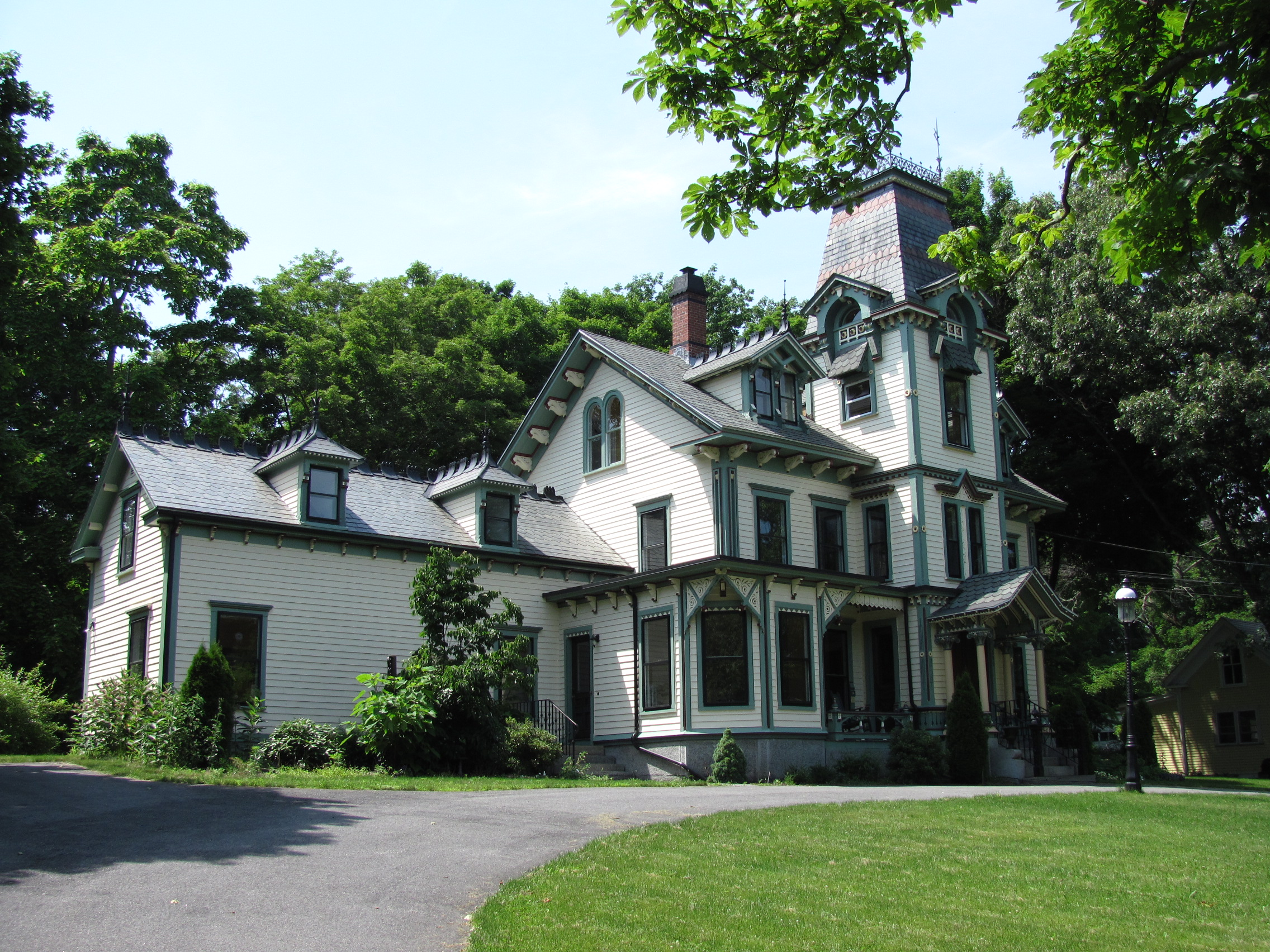
- Benjamin Stanley Freeman Home

- Location within Massachusetts Location within the United States
- Location: North Attleborough, Massachusetts
- Coordinates: 41°58′6″N 71°19′7″W
- Area: 42 acres (17 ha)
- Architectural style: Italianate, Bungalow/Craftsman
- NRHP reference No.: 03001372
- Added to NRHP: January 6, 2004

The Attleborough Falls Historic District is a predominantly residential historic district on Mt. Hope and Towne Streets in North Attleborough, Massachusetts. Located just south of the Ten Mile River, it encompasses a stylish mid-to-late 19th century residential area that developed in a previously rural area due to industrial development across the river. The district was added to the National Register of Historic Places in 2004.

== Description and history ==
Attleborough Falls is located in central North Attleborough, a community in northern Bristol County northeast of Pawtucket, Rhode Island. Beginning in the early 19th century, the area began to industrialize, with the jewelry-making industry as its major economic force. Factories were built on the north side of the Ten Mile River, between it and Commonwealth Avenue, and the area to its south was developed beginning in the 1850s as a residential area for people associated with those industries, and later with those reachable by public transportation available on Commonwealth Avenue.

The historic district is roughly triangular in shape, bounded on the north by the Ten Mile River, the west by Mount Hope Street, and the southeast by Towne Street. Both of these roads date to the rural beginnings of the area. A few former farmhouses predate the period of industrialization, two of them Federal period houses dating to about 1790. Mt. Hope Street has a fair number of Greek Revival and Italianate houses dating to the 1850s, the first period of residential development associated with the industries across the river. These were joined in the 1870s-90s by a large assortment of vernacular and high-style Victorian houses. The finest of the latter is probably the house of B. S. Freeman at 370 Mt. Hope Street: Freeman owned one of the jewelry factories, and built this elaborate Queen Anne house about 1890. The house of John F. Sturdy, another jewelry factory owner, stands at 110 Towne Street, and is a rambling Second Empire structure built c. 1870.

== See also ==
- National Register of Historic Places listings in Bristol County, Massachusetts
