= North Attleborough Center, Massachusetts =

- Former Census-designated place
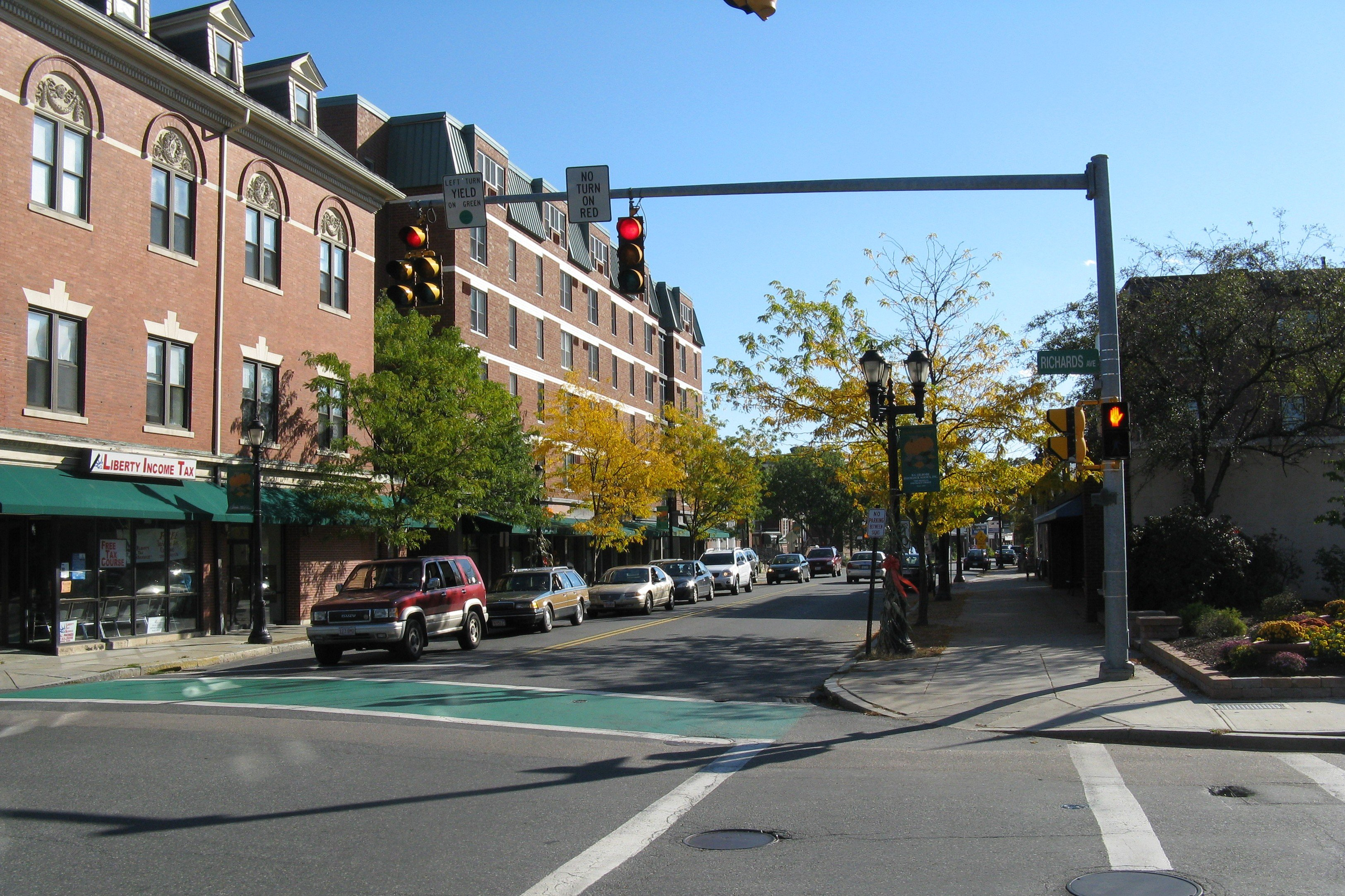
- Corner of Richards Avenue and North Washington Street
- Interactive map of North Attleborough Center, Massachusetts
- Coordinates: 41°58′37″N 71°19′49″W
- Country: United States
- State: Massachusetts
- County: Bristol
- Town: North Attleborough

Area
  - Total: 5.8 sq mi (14.9 km^{2})
  - Land: 5.5 sq mi (14.3 km^{2})
  - Water: 0.23 sq mi (0.6 km^{2})

Population (2000)
  - Total: 16,796
  - Density: 3,042/sq mi (1,174.6/km^{2})
- Time zone: UTC-5 (Eastern (EST))
  - Summer (DST): UTC-4 (EDT)
- FIPS code: 25-46585

North Attleborough Center is the central developed area in the town of North Attleborough in Bristol County, Massachusetts, United States. It was a census-designated place at the 2000 census, at which time its population was 16,796. It was not delineated as a census-designated place in 2010.

== Geography ==
North Attleborough Center is located at 41°58′37″N 71°19′49″W (41.977049, -71.330377).

According to the United States Census Bureau, the CDP had a total area of 14.9 km^{2} (5.8 mi^{2}), of which 14.3 km^{2} (5.5 mi^{2}) was land and 0.6 km^{2} (0.2 mi^{2}) (3.83%) was water.

== Demographics ==
As of the census of 2000, there were 16,796 people, 6,932 households, and 4,353 families residing in the CDP. The population density was 1,174.8/km^{2} (3,042.3/mi^{2}). There were 7,133 housing units at an average density of 498.9/km^{2} (1,292.0/mi^{2}). The racial makeup of the CDP was 95.43% White, 1.13% African American, 0.17% Native American, 1.74% Asian, 0.02% Pacific Islander, 0.61% from other races, and 0.90% from two or more races. Hispanic or Latino of any race were 1.69% of the population.

There were 6,932 households, out of which 32.1% had children under the age of 18 living with them, 48.2% were married couples living together, 10.8% had a female householder with no husband present, and 37.2% were non-families. 30.2% of all households were made up of individuals, and 7.8% had someone living alone who was 65 years of age or older. The average household size was 2.40 and the average family size was 3.04.

In the CDP, the population was spread out, with 25.1% under the age of 18, 7.2% from 18 to 24, 36.3% from 25 to 44, 20.7% from 45 to 64, and 10.7% who were 65 years of age or older. The median age was 35 years. For every 100 females, there were 93.2 males. For every 100 females age 18 and over, there were 89.8 males.

The median income for a household in the CDP was $50,875, and the median income for a family was $61,846. Males had a median income of $44,076 versus $30,205 for females. The per capita income for the CDP was $24,710. About 3.6% of families and 4.7% of the population were below the poverty line, including 6.1% of those under age 18 and 4.2% of those age 65 or over.
