= Elizabeth Poirier =

American politician (born 1942)

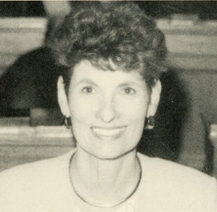

Member of the Massachusetts House of Representatives from the 14th Bristol district
- In office 1999 – January 2021
- Preceded by: Kevin Poirier
- Succeeded by: Adam Scanlon

Personal details
- Born: October 27, 1942 (age 83) Boston, Massachusetts
- Party: Republican
- Spouse: Kevin Poirier
- Education: Johnson & Wales University
- Occupation: Politician

Elizabeth Poirier (born October 27, 1942, in Boston, Massachusetts) is an American politician who represented the 14th Bristol district in the Massachusetts House of Representatives until 2021, and was the Third Assistant House Minority Leader. She succeeded her husband Kevin Poirier, who resigned to become director of development at Sturdy Memorial Hospital. She announced in March 2020 that she would not seek another term in that year's election.

== See also ==
- 2019–2020 Massachusetts legislature
- North Attleborough
