= Wakefield Trust Company =

- U.S. National Register of Historic Places
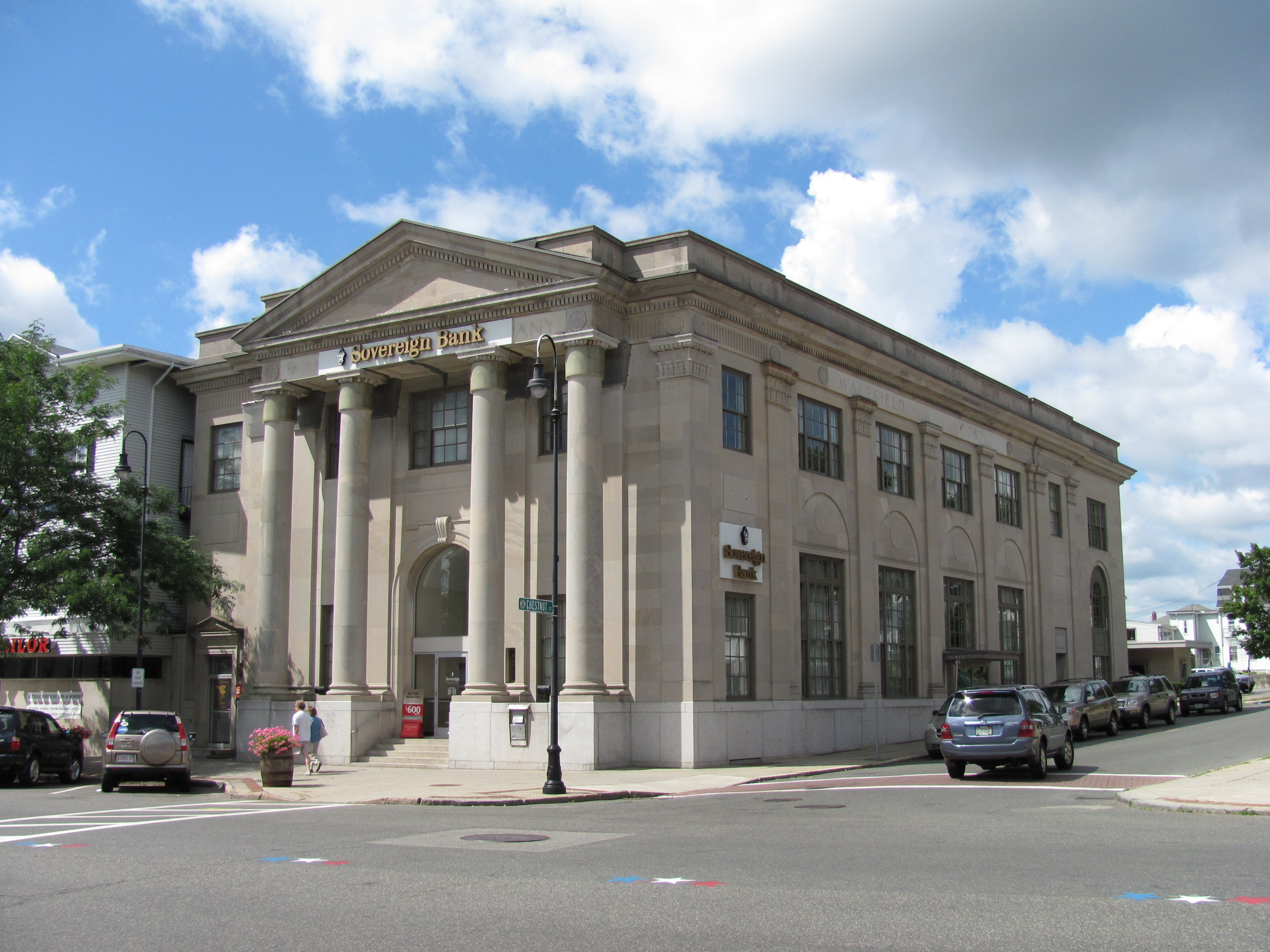
- Wakefield Trust Company

- Location within Massachusetts Location within the United States
- Location: 371 Main St., Wakefield, Massachusetts
- Coordinates: 42°30′14″N 71°4′17″W
- Built: 1924
- Architect: Hutchins & French
- Architectural style: Classical Revival
- MPS: Wakefield MRA
- NRHP reference No.: 89000728
- Added to NRHP: July 06, 1989

The Wakefield Trust Company is a historic commercial building at 371 Main Street in Wakefield, Massachusetts. Built in 1924, it is one of three buildings on the west side of Main Street (along with the library and main post office) that give the town center a strong Classical Revival flavor. The building was listed on the National Register of Historic Places in 1989.

== Description and history ==
The Wakefield Trust Company building stands on the west side of Main Street in downtown Wakefield, at the southwest corner of Chestnut Street. It is a two-story structure, built out of limestone. Its main facade has a projecting Greek temple pavilion, with four smooth round columns supporting an entablature and a fully pedimented and dentillated gable. The main entrance, accessed via a low set of steps between the central columns, is set in a tall round-arch opening. The bays of the front and north sides are separated by pilasters, and the windows on the north side, while rectangular sash, are set in panels that echo the rounded arch of the entrance.

The Wakefield Trust Company was founded in 1854 as the South Reading Bank (Wakefield then being called South Reading). After several reorganizations and mergers, it acquired that name in 1926. This building was constructed in 1924, when it was known as the Wakefield National Bank. It was built at a cost of $300,000 to a design by Hutchins & French of Boston. Its Classical Revival features followed those of the library, which stands one block north and was built in 1922, and precede those of the post office, which stands beyond the library and was built in 1936.

== See also ==
- National Register of Historic Places listings in Wakefield, Massachusetts
- National Register of Historic Places listings in Middlesex County, Massachusetts
