= Manufacturer's National Bank =

- U.S. National Register of Historic Places
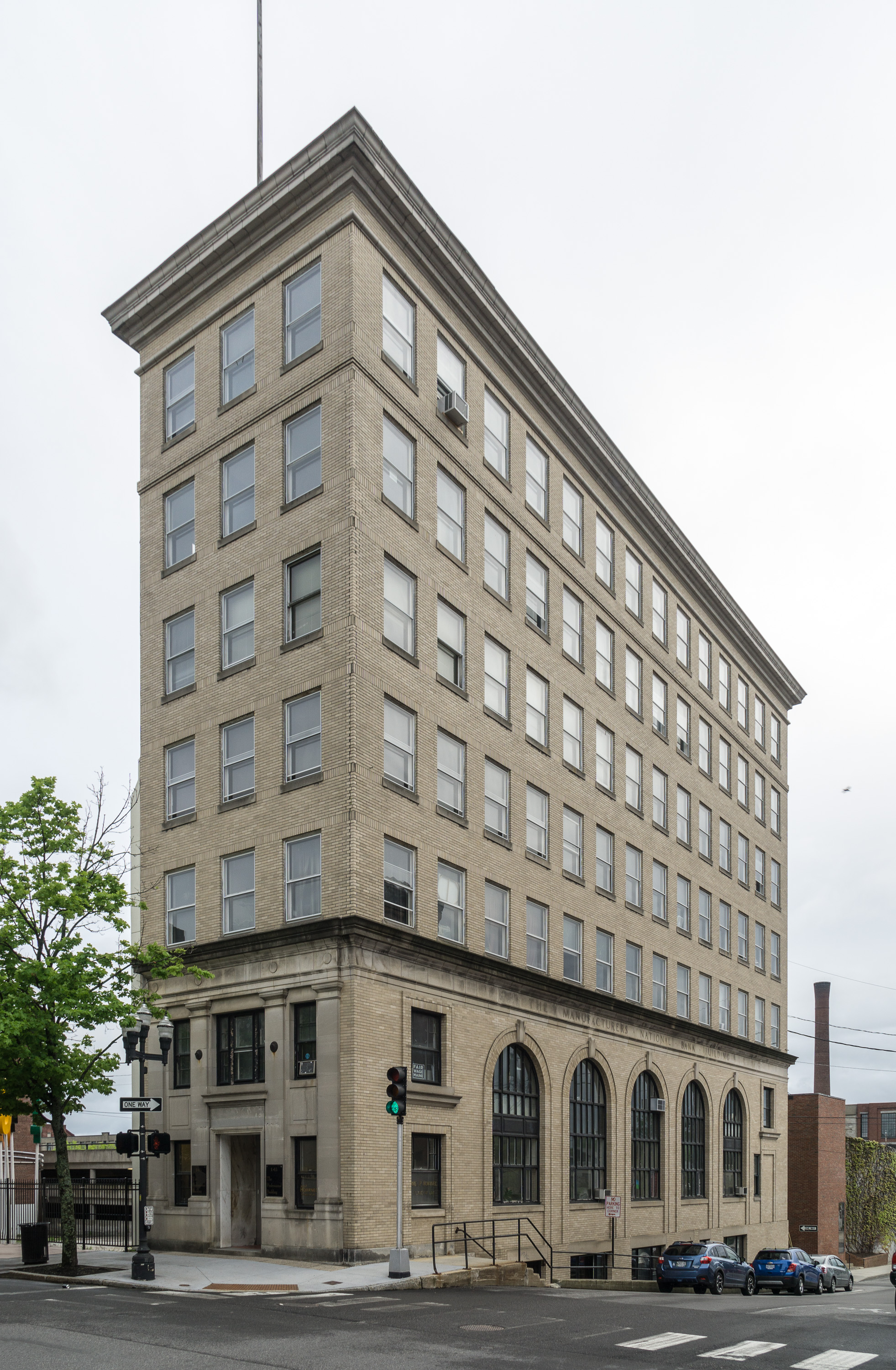
- Manufacturer's National Bank

- Location within Maine Location within the United States
- Location: 145 Lisbon Street, Lewiston, Maine
- Coordinates: 44°5′46″N 70°13′4″W
- Built: 1914
- Architect: Hutchins & French
- Architectural style: Classical Revival
- MPS: Lewiston Commercial District MRA
- NRHP reference No.: 86002287
- Added to NRHP: April 25, 1986

The Manufacturer's National Bank is a historic commercial building at 145 Lisbon Street Lewiston, Maine. Built in 1914, it was the tallest commercial building in Lewiston until 1950, and was one of the last major commercial buildings erected in the city before World War I, and one of the few that exhibits Classical Revival style. It was listed on the National Register of Historic Places in 1986.

== Description and history ==
The Manufacturer's National Bank building is located at the southwest corner of Lisbon and Ash Streets in downtown Lewiston. The building is seven stories tall, and presents three bays to Lisbon Street and eight to Ash. Ash Street slopes downhill from Lisbon Street, exposing the basement level. Most of the building is finished in yellow brick, although much of the street level facade on Lisbon Street is in limestone. That facade has three bays articulated by two-story pilasters, with sash windows in the outer bays and the upper five floors. The entrance is recessed in the center bay, with a three-part window on the second floor. A cornice line with decorated entablature extends between the second and third floors on both street-facing facades. The first two floors of the Ash Street facade are dominated by tall round-arch windows, with store fronts in the exposed basement level. A projecting belt course separates the sixth and seventh floors, and the building is capped by a flat roof with a projecting cornice.

The building was erected in 1914. It was designed by Hutchins & French of Boston, and it is stylistically similar to large office buildings built in New York City and Chicago at the time. The Manufacturer's National Bank was founded in 1875, and was originally located in the Pilsbury Block. The building continues to house commercial tenants.

== See also ==
- National Register of Historic Places listings in Androscoggin County, Maine
