= North Attleborough, Massachusetts =

- City
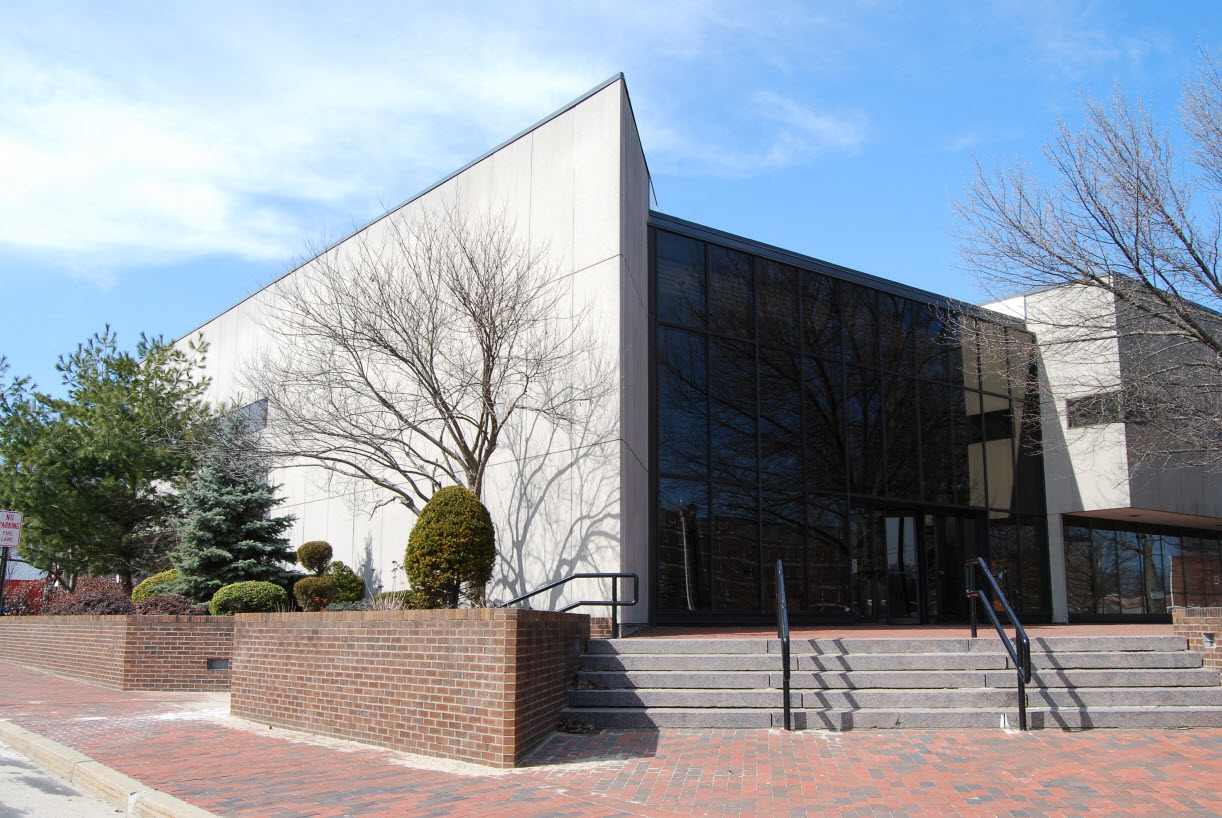
- North Attleborough Town Hall

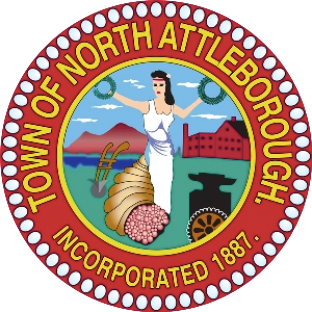
- Seal

- Location in Bristol County in Massachusetts
- Coordinates: 41°59′00″N 71°20′00″W
- Country: United States
- State: Massachusetts
- County: Bristol
- Settled: 1669
- Incorporated: 1887

Government
  - Type: Town manager and town council
  - Town manager: Michael Borg

Area
  - Total: 19.0 sq mi (49.3 km^{2})
  - Land: 18.6 sq mi (48.3 km^{2})
  - Water: 0.42 sq mi (1.1 km^{2})
- Elevation: 200 ft (61 m)

Population (2020)
  - Total: 30,834
  - Density: 1,653/sq mi (638.4/km^{2})
- Time zone: UTC−5 (Eastern)
  - Summer (DST): UTC−4 (Eastern)
- ZIP Codes: 02760 (North Attleboro); 02763 (Attleboro Falls)
- Area code: 508/774
- FIPS code: 25-46598
- GNIS feature ID: 0618284
- Website: nattleboro.com

North Attleborough, alternatively spelled North Attleboro, is a city in Bristol County, Massachusetts, United States. The population was 30,834 at the 2020 census.

The villages of Attleboro Falls and North Attleborough Center are located in the city.

== History ==
In pre-Colonial times, the land was the site of the Bay Path, a major Native American trail to Narragansett Bay, the Seekonk River, and Boston. English settlers arrived in the area in 1634 and established the settlement of Rehoboth—which included the modern day municipalities of North Attleborough, Attleboro, Somerset, Seekonk, as well as parts of Rhode Island—from land sold to them by the Pokanoket Wamsutta. John Woodcock established a settlement in the territory in 1669 which subsisted on agriculture, fishing and hunting. By 1670, Woodcock had received a license to open a tavern. The settlement was attacked during King Philip's War, with two killed and one home burned, but the Garrison house which Woodcock had built survived the attack. The Woodcock-Garrison house was used as sleeping quarters for George Washington on his army's march to Boston to rid the city of General Thomas Gage's troops. The Town of Attleborough was incorporated from this territory in 1694.

In about 1780, a French settler named Lazarus Periera set up a forge for working brass, beginning the industrial era. Englishmen brought with them British machinery from Birmingham in 1794 and designed American improvements in button making, which they patented. During the 18th and early 19th centuries, small grist and sawmills were built along the Ten Mile River, and subsequently established nail factories were eventually eclipsed by cotton spinning mills. The development of cotton spinning was spurred by the embargo on imports resulting from the War of 1812. Textiles and jewelry manufacturing were the staple industries of the town by 1832, but buttons became king, spurred by the American Civil War and U.S. Army orders for badges and medals. By 1834, Attleborough produced more buttons than anywhere else in the United States; by 1855, there were 24 shops making almost $1 million in jewelry in Attleborough.

In 1887, the residents of the village of East Attleborough voted to secede, and they had higher population and votes to take with them the name of Attleborough and the town's original founding date of 1694; they incorporated as the new City of Attleborough, and the remainder of the original town adopted the name North Attleborough.

In the twentieth century, North Attleborough was home at various times to the jewelry firms Jostens, the world's largest class ring manufacturer, and the Balfour Company, prominent maker of championship rings, including for the National Football League's Super Bowl champions and Major League Baseball's World Series winners. In 2006, North Attleborough was rated in the top ten for professional sports communities in the entire country and was also listed as one of the most affordable and safest places to raise a family. Today, North Attleborough is still home to many professional athletes due to its proximity to Gillette Stadium just five miles away.

== Geography ==
According to the United States Census Bureau, the city has a total area of 19.0 square miles (49 km^{2}), of which 18.6 square miles (48 km^{2}) is land and 0.4 square miles (1.0 km^{2}) (2.15%) is water. The city is roughly quadrilateral-shaped, and makes the northwest corner of Bristol County. It is bordered by Plainville (in Norfolk County) to the north, Mansfield to the east, Attleboro to the south, and Cumberland, Rhode Island to the west. Localities include Adamsdale, Attleborough Falls and Sheldonville Farms. The city is located 16 miles (26 km) north of Providence, Rhode Island, 38 miles (61 km) southwest of Boston and 42 miles (68 km) southeast of Worcester.

The city has several rivers, streams and brooks running through it, including the Ten Mile River and the Seven Mile River. There are several ponds and lakes, including Greenwood Lake (site of a fish hatchery) and Falls Pond, among others. The city's largest park, World War I Memorial Park, is located in the northern part of city and contains the highest point in Bristol County-Sunrise Hill (Watery Hill) at 390 feet (120 m) above sea level. World War I Memorial Park features a petting zoo, Petti Field for soccer and lacrosse and a ski/sledding hill with J-bar ski lift which is currently inoperative. There is also the North Attleborough Arboretum adjacent to the park.

On High Street, one block from Route 1A, is an ice-skating pond called Titus Pond which is maintained by the North Attleborough Rotary Club and filled each winter by the Fire Department.

There are five cemeteries in North Attleborough: the diminutive and inactive Woodcock Cemetery across from the Woodcock-Garrison house just north of downtown; Paine Road Cemetery near the Cumberland, Rhode Island, border; Mt. Hope Cemetery & Arboretum; the old St. Mary's Cemetery and the new St. Mary's Cemetery. The latter three are located in the village of Attleborough Falls.

== Demographics ==
Historical population
Year	Pop.	±%
1890	6,727	—
1900	7,253	+7.8%
1910	9,562	+31.8%
1920	9,238	−3.4%
1930	10,197	+10.4%
1940	10,359	+1.6%
1950	12,146	+17.3%
1960	14,777	+21.7%
1970	18,665	+26.3%
1980	21,095	+13.0%
1990	25,038	+18.7%
2000	28,978	+15.7%
2010	28,712	−0.9%
2020	30,834	+7.4%
2024*	32,135	+4.2%
* = population estimate. Source: United States Census records and Population Estimates Program data.

As of the 2020 U.S. Census, there were 30,834 people and 12,855 households residing in the city. The population density was 1,657.7 inhabitants per square mile (640.0/km^{2}). There were 12,551 housing units in the city. The racial makeup of the city was 83.75% White, 3.06% African American, 0.13% Native American, 5.91% Asian, 0.02% Pacific Islander, 1.70% from other races, and 5.44% from two or more races. Hispanic or Latino of any race were 4.05% of the population.

There were 12,855 households, of which 28.3% had children under the age of 18 living with them, 49.2% were married couples living together, 25.4% had a female householder with no spouse present, and 18.9% had a male householder with no spouse present. 15.1% of all households were made up of individuals, and 6.1% had someone living alone who was 65 years of age or older. The average household size was 2.38 and the average family size was 3.00.

Age distribution was 20.6% under the age of 18, 6.7% from 18 to 24, 25.5% from 25 to 44, 30.6% from 45 to 64, and 16.6% who were 65 years of age or older. The median age was 42.9 years.

The median household income in 2020 was $109,426 compared to $59,371 in 2000. About 5.4% of the population was below the poverty line, including 6.6% of those under age 18 and 5.5% of those age 65 or over.

== Arts and culture ==
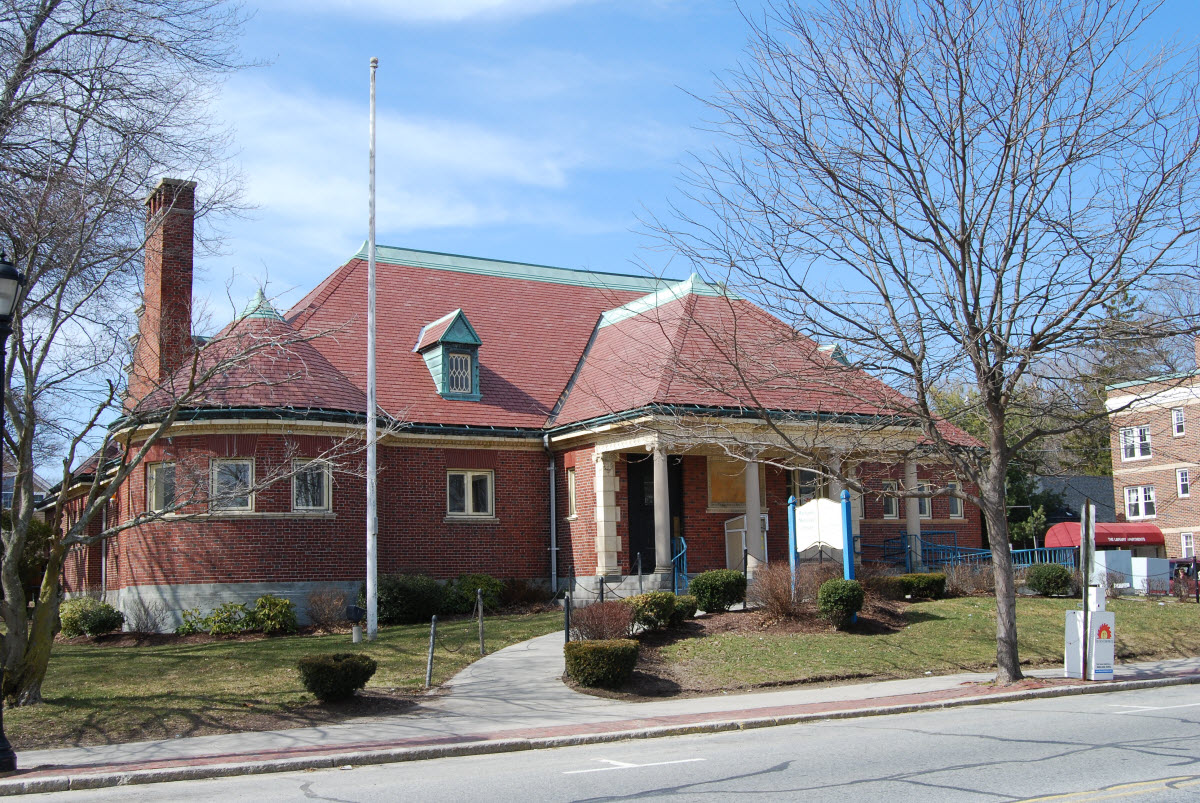
Richards Memorial Library

=== Library ===
"The North Attleborough Public Library was established in 1889, by the North Attleborough Union Improvement District, which turned its library over to the town." Today the Richards Memorial Library is located downtown, and is a member of SAILS Library Network, a network of libraries in Southeastern Massachusetts. In fiscal year 2008, the town spent 0.77% ($572,874) of its budget on its public library—approximately $20 per person, per year ($24.49 adjusted for inflation to 2021).

=== Points of interest ===
- Angle Tree Stone
- Emerald Square
- North Attleborough Town Center Historic District

== Government ==
=== State and national government ===
North Attleborough is represented in the Massachusetts House of Representatives by Adam Scanlon (D-Attleboro) as part of the Fourteenth Bristol district, which also includes sections of Attleborough and Mansfield. Scanlon won the 2020 election after incumbent Elizabeth "Betty" Poirier (R-North Attleborough), having served since 1999, announced she would not run for another term. In the State Senate, North Attleborough was represented by Becca Rausch (D-Needham) as part of the Norfolk, Bristol & Middlesex district, which included the towns of Wayland, Sherborn, Millis, Norfolk, Wrentham and Plainville as well as sections of Natick, Wellesley, Needham, Franklin and Attleborough. Rausch won the seat after defeating the incumbent, Richard Ross (R-Wrentham) in 2018. Due to redistricting, the city is now represented by Paul Feeney as a park of the Bristol and Norfolk district.

On the national level, North Attleborough is a part of Massachusetts's 4th congressional district in the United States House of Representatives represented by Jake Auchincloss (D-Newton). In the United States Senate it is represented by Elizabeth Warren (D-Cambridge) and Ed Markey (D-Malden).

=== Local government and services ===
Until 2019, North Attleborough has had a representative town meeting form of government, with an elected board of selectmen and a town administrator appointed by the selectmen. On April 2, 2019, North Attleboro voters approved a new structure for a city form of government, a charter creating a "strong" city manager that will replace the Board of Selectmen and a nine-member City Council replacing the 135-seat Representative Town Meeting. The new charter went into effect on July 1, 2019, following a June 18, 2019, special election for town council. North Attleborough is one of thirteen Massachusetts municipalities that have applied for, and been granted, city forms of government, though they wish to be known as "The Town of".

North Attleborough presidential election results
Year	Democratic	Republican	Third parties	Total Votes	Margin
2020	56.56% 9,724	41.01% 7,050	2.43% 417	17,191	15.55%
2016	47.41% 7,059	45.11% 6,716	7.48% 1,113	14,888	2.30%
2012	46.66% 6,651	51.63% 7,359	1.70% 243	14,253	4.97%
2008	50.23% 7,099	47.50% 6,713	2.28% 322	14,134	2.73%
2004	50.47% 6,815	48.10% 6,496	1.43% 193	13,504	2.36%
2000	52.42% 6,351	41.10% 4,980	6.48% 785	12,116	11.32%
1996	52.69% 5,733	34.14% 3,715	13.17% 1,433	10,881	18.55%
1992	34.87% 3,699	34.72% 3,683	30.42% 3,227	10,609	0.15%
1988	39.41% 3,911	59.48% 5,903	1.11% 110	9,924	20.07%
1984	31.90% 2,753	67.81% 5,851	0.29% 25	8,629	35.90%
1980	31.16% 2,596	52.52% 4,375	16.31% 1,359	8,330	21.36%
1976	47.11% 3,825	49.54% 4,023	3.35% 272	8,120	2.44%
1972	43.24% 3,336	55.66% 4,294	1.10% 85	7,715	12.42%
1968	55.41% 4,068	39.59% 2,907	5.00% 367	7,342	15.81%
1964	72.33% 5,082	27.27% 1,916	0.40% 28	7,026	45.06%
1960	52.42% 3,726	47.36% 3,366	0.23% 16	7,108	5.06%
1956	28.65% 1,933	71.13% 4,799	0.22% 15	6,747	42.48%
1952	33.89% 2,250	65.95% 4,379	0.17% 11	6,640	32.06%
1948	42.20% 2,433	56.95% 3,283	0.85% 49	5,765	14.74%
1944	41.19% 2,157	58.56% 3,067	0.25% 13	5,237	17.38%
1940	40.10% 2,111	59.37% 3,125	0.53% 28	5,264	19.26%

Voter registration and party enrollment as of October 15, 2016
Party	Number of voters	Percentage
Democratic	4,002	19.9%
Republican	3,237	16.00%
Unaffiliated	12,707	63.18%
Green-Rainbow	23	.11%
United Independent	61	.30%
Total	20,111	100%

== Education ==
=== Public schools ===
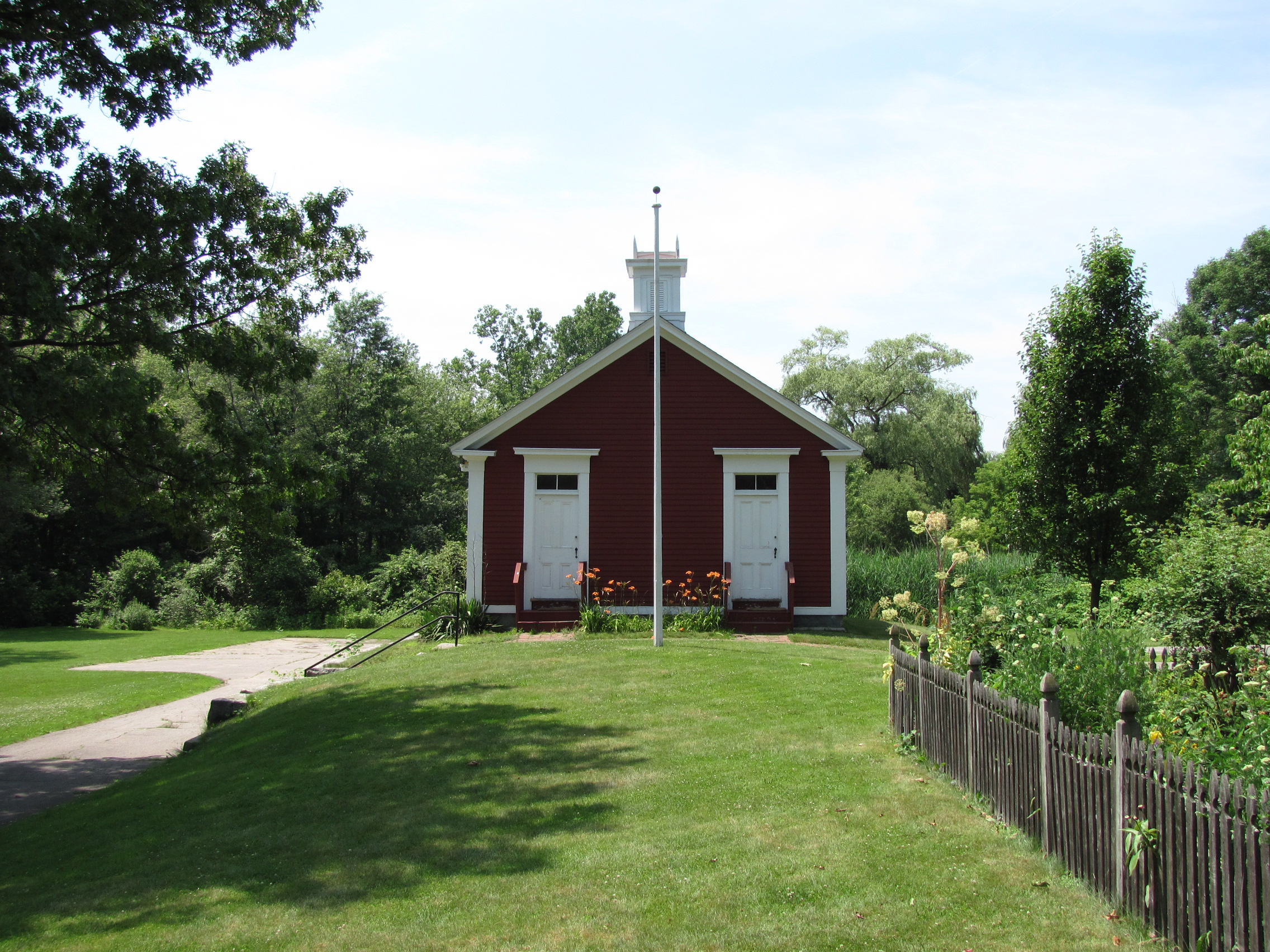
Little Red Schoolhouse

The North Attleborough Public School District runs eight public schools and has a total enrollment of approximately 4,000 students. The current superintendent is John Antonucci. There are seven elected School Committee members. Students are also part of formal School Committee proceedings. In 2019, the school department expenditures were $60.745 million with a per-pupil average expenditure of $13,850.

In April 2018, citizens voted and approved a $6.5 million increased tax levy after the town's budget needs were lagging. The tax override was, in part (approximately 40%), to increase funding for the public schools. Even with the fiscal conservative history of the town, the override passed with 57% of voters approving the measure. The town made immediate investments to advance school infrastructure projects and staffing, public safety and community services.

Massachusetts has the nation's top-ranked public schools, and North Attleborough Public Schools (NAPS) has received high marks for Academics, Quality Teachers, College Prep, and Health & Safety, according to niche.com and other sources.

The following schools make up the North Attleborough Public Schools:

- The Early Learning Center (Preschool)
- Amvet Boulevard School (Grades K–5)
- Community School (Grades K–5)
- Falls School (Grades K–5)
- Joseph W. Martin Jr. School (Grades K–5)
- Roosevelt Avenue School (Grades K–5)
- North Attleborough Middle School (Grades 6–8)
- North Attleborough High School (Grades 9–12)

=== Private schools ===
The city is home to one Catholic K–8 school, Saint Mary-Sacred Heart School. The nearest private high school is Bishop Feehan High School in Attleboro, a Catholic high school.

== Infrastructure ==
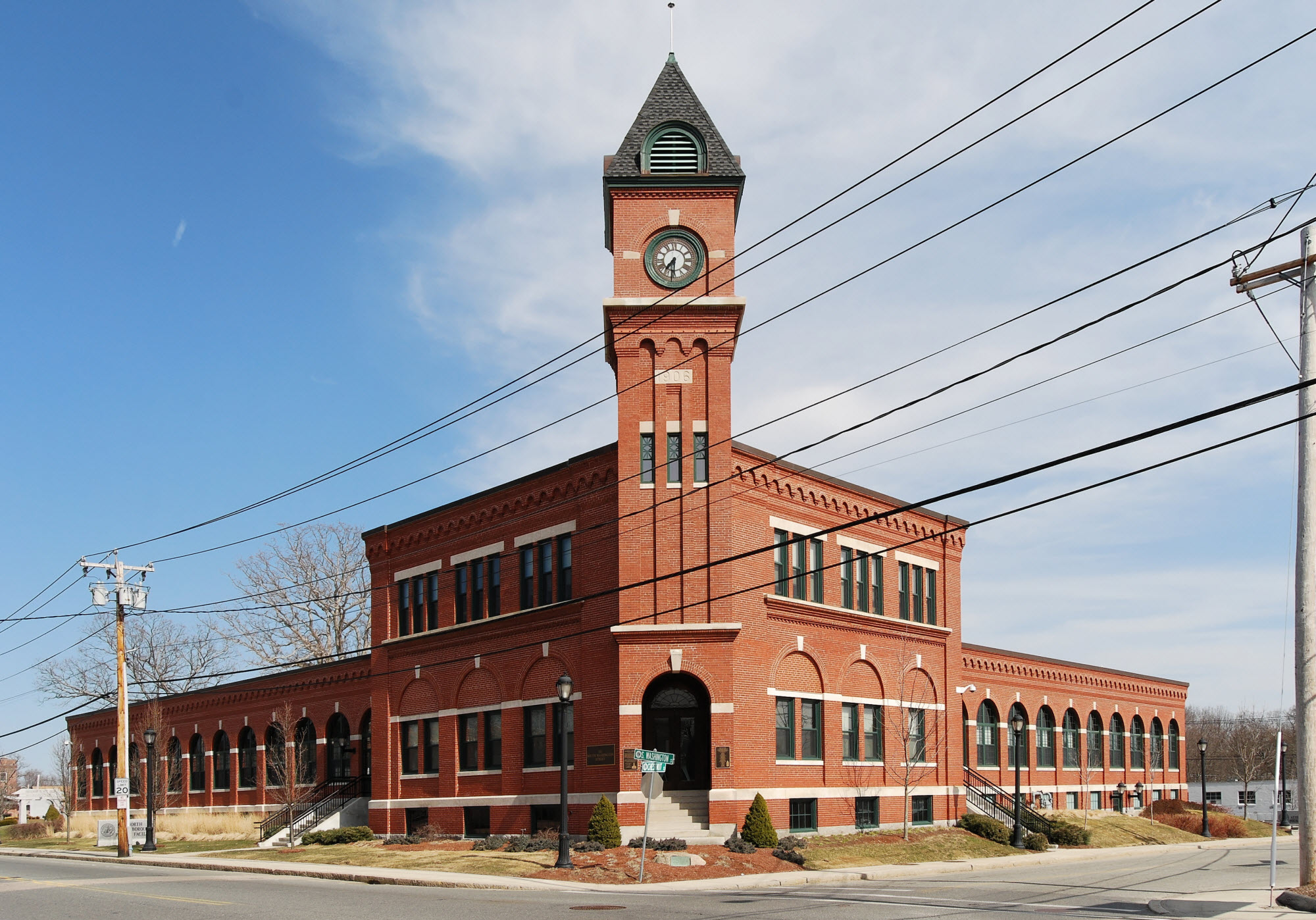
Police station

=== Transportation ===
Interstates 95 and 295 meet just over the Attleborough line, and both run through the city. Each interstate has one exit within the city. The city is also bisected by U.S. Route 1, which runs through the retail and downtown districts. Massachusetts state routes 120 and 152 also run through city, as does the "middle" portion of Route 1A, which begins in the city.

The city is set equidistantly among the three nearest MBTA Commuter Rail stops, in Mansfield, Attleborough Center and South Attleborough. The Greater Attleboro Taunton Regional Transit Authority provides bus services between the local towns and cities. The nearest national-level airport is T.F. Green Airport in Rhode Island, approximately 23 miles away, and the nearest international airport is Logan International Airport in Boston, approximately 42 miles away.

=== Police ===
The North Attleborough Police Department is located downtown in the old H.F. Barrows Manufacturing Company Building at 102 South Washington St. There are three fire stations, located downtown on Elm Street just off Route 1, Allen Ave behind Emerald Square Mall and on Route 152 in the eastern portion of the city. There are also two post offices, downtown (using the 02760 ZIP code) and in Attleboro Falls (02763). North Attleboro also uses 02761 for post office boxes located downtown.

=== Revitalization projects ===
The Balfour Co. Building in North Attleboro was a branch of the L.G. Balfour Company, a jewelry company that employed many residents of Attleboro and North Attleboro, and is a significant part of the town's history. The building, left abandoned for decades, is a prime example of urban blight in the town and was often regarded as the town's biggest eyesore, as it was incredibly run down and dilapidated. In a 2014 attempt to begin revitalizing the town, developers expressed interest in the Balfour building and plans were underway to build a new apartment building and bus stop in its place. However, after an initial overhaul of the area's infrastructure, such as water mains and streets, the developers pulled out after being unable to finance the $40 million revitalization.

In 2017, Boston Realty Advisors secured a loan that will allow them to completely develop the area of the old Balfour building into a Class A apartment complex that will have 193 units and 11,500 square feet of retail space. This mixed-use zoning / development allows for one development to house different functions—the new building on 21 East Street will have a gym, restaurant, retail space, and shuttles to MBTA stations in addition to the apartments. This transit-oriented development places residents close to public transportation, which reduces travel times. Both the mixed-use development and the transit-oriented development combat urban sprawl, which is all too common in the Boston–Providence suburbs. The new apartment complex will not only bring large amounts of tax revenue to North Attleboro, but create new Class A, a type of luxury apartment, that will bring in high-income tenants.

Though this infill of an old, abandoned building is beneficial in many ways and a useful response to blight occurring in the town, an oversight by planners and developers regarding the drainage of a swamp that used to exist beneath U.S. Route 1 shifted environmental burdens towards neighboring, lower-income households. The new building at 21 East Street has shifted drainage and flooded nearby homes, according to residents. In spite of these complaints, the city gave the developers permission to open two of three buildings, while they have sixty days to address the drainage problem; this issue raised concerns and questions about the role of municipal governments in overseeing such large and impactful projects.

== Notable people ==
- Aaron Hernandez, former New England Patriots tight end and convicted murderer
- Allen Ripley, professional baseball player
- Anthony Sherman, professional football player
- Chris Sullivan, former defensive end for the New England Patriots and the Pittsburgh Steelers
- Colin Grafton, Team USA figure skater, 2012 National bronze Medalist, 2012 Junior World Team Member
- Elizabeth Poirier, Republican politician in the Massachusetts House of Representatives representing the 14th Bristol district from 1999-2021
- Frank C. Whitmore, organic chemist
- Jeff Sutherland, computer scientist and cofounder of Scrum
- Jerod Mayo, former head coach, former linebackers coach, and former linebacker for the New England Patriots
- Joseph W. Martin Jr., Republican US representative, Speaker of the House of Representatives; J.W. Martin Elementary School is named in his honor
- Kara Corcoran, military officer
- Steve Pearce, professional baseball player
- William J. Maguire (1916–1997), politician who served in the New Jersey General Assembly from 1976 to 1982
- Will Levis, professional football player for the Tennessee Titans, lived in North Attleborough until he was seven years old

== In popular culture ==
- Right There, an award-winning 2013 silent comedy film, was filmed in downtown North Attleboro.
- In How to Marry a Millionaire (1953 film starring Lauren Bacall and Marilyn Monroe) one of the ladies' dates mentions his aunt is from North Attleborough, Massachusetts.
