= Stephen Lynch (politician) =

American politician (born 1955)

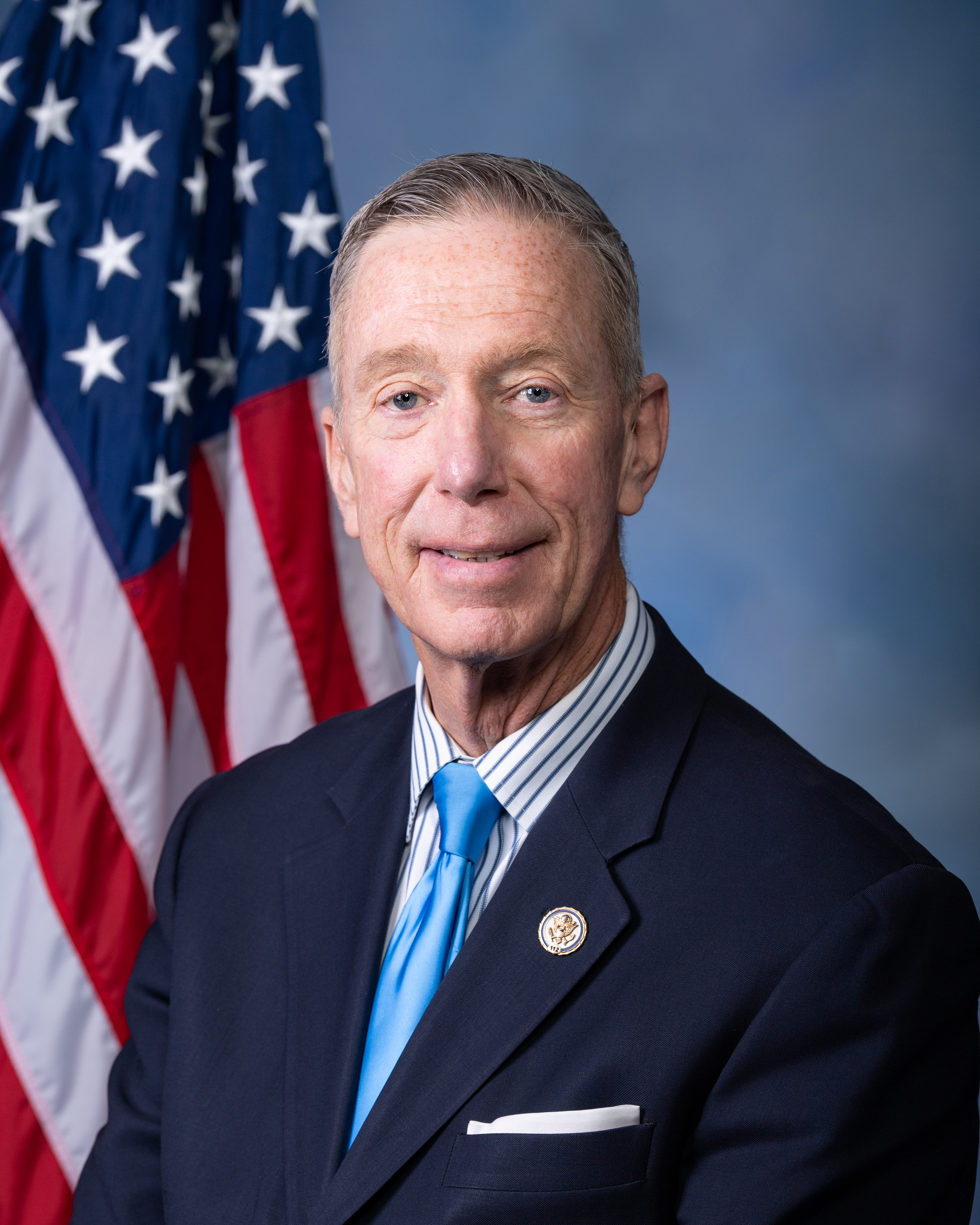
- Official portrait, 2019

Ranking Member of the House Oversight Committee
- Acting
- In office April 28, 2025 – June 24, 2025
- Preceded by: Gerry Connolly
- Succeeded by: Robert Garcia

Member of the U.S. House of Representatives from Massachusetts
- Incumbent
- Assumed office October 16, 2001 (Note: Lynch's official service begins on the date of the special election, while he was not sworn in until October 23, 2001.)
- Preceded by: Joe Moakley
- Constituency: 9th district (2001–2013); 8th district (2013–present)

Member of the Massachusetts Senate from the 1st Suffolk district
- In office May 1, 1996 – October 16, 2001
- Preceded by: William Bulger
- Succeeded by: Jack Hart

Member of the Massachusetts House of Representatives from the 4th Suffolk district
- In office January 3, 1995 – May 1, 1996
- Preceded by: Paul J. Gannon
- Succeeded by: Jack Hart

Personal details
- Born: Stephen Francis Lynch; March 31, 1955 (age 71) Boston, Massachusetts, U.S.
- Party: Democratic
- Spouse: Margaret Shaughnessy (m. 1992)
- Children: 1
- Education: University of Wisconsin, Madison (attended); Wentworth Institute of Technology (BS); Boston College (JD); Harvard University (MPA)
- Website: House website Campaign website
- Lynch's voice Lynch supporting the 2015 National POW/MIA Remembrance Act. Recorded March 21, 2016

Stephen Francis Lynch (born March 31, 1955) is an American businessman, lawyer, and politician who has served as a member of the U.S. House of Representatives from Massachusetts since 2001. A Democrat, he represents Massachusetts's 8th congressional district, which includes the southern fourth of Boston and many of its southern suburbs. Lynch was previously an ironworker and lawyer, and served in both chambers of the Massachusetts General Court.

Born and raised in South Boston, Lynch is the son of an ironworker. He went into the trade after high school, working in an apprenticeship and later joining his father's union. He became the union's youngest president, at age 30, while attending the Wentworth Institute of Technology. He received his J.D. from Boston College Law School in 1991.

In 1994, Lynch was elected to the Massachusetts House of Representatives. During his tenure, his advocacy for South Boston helped propel him to the Massachusetts Senate in 1995, when he won a special election to succeed state senator William Bulger. Lynch won a special election to represent the state's 9th district in the United States House of Representatives in 2001, and has been reelected ever since. His district was redrawn into the 8th district in 2013. He sits on the Financial Services and Oversight and Government Reform Committees. Lynch ran for the Democratic nomination in the 2013 special election for the U.S. Senate, losing to Ed Markey.

== Early life, education, and business career ==
The fourth of six children, Lynch was born on March 31, 1955, in the neighborhood of South Boston. He was raised with his five sisters in the Old Colony Housing Project. His father, Francis Lynch, was an ironworker. His mother, Anne (née Havlin), was a post office worker. Both parents came from fourth-generation South Boston families. He attended St. Augustine Elementary School and South Boston High School. During high school vacations he began working in construction alongside his father. After graduating from high school in 1973, Lynch became an apprentice ironworker. For the next six years he worked on high-altitude structural ironwork throughout the country for various companies, including General Motors and U.S. Steel.

In 1977 Lynch was arrested for smoking marijuana at a Willie Nelson concert at the Illinois State Fair, leading to a $50 misdemeanor fine. In 1979 he was arrested for assault and battery of six Iranian students attending an anti-American protest in Boston, a charge that was later dropped. Around this time, he developed "a problem with alcohol", leading him to join Alcoholics Anonymous. (He reportedly left AA after meeting his future wife several years later, but continued to attend occasional meetings through the 2000s.)

When a 1979 blizzard forced his project in Wisconsin to shut down, he spent the extra time taking courses at the University of Wisconsin–Madison. Shortly thereafter, his father was diagnosed with cancer, and so Lynch returned to Boston. In the early 1980s, he was elected to the executive board of the Iron Workers Local 7 union. At age 30, he was elected president of the board, the youngest in the local's history. During this time he spent his nights and weekends attending the Wentworth Institute of Technology, from which he graduated cum laude with a bachelor's degree in construction management in 1988.

That year Lynch led a three-week labor strike, refusing to sign a contract with the Associated General Contractors despite pressure from within his union. The union international ultimately signed the contract without Lynch's approval, causing him to file suit against them. He later remarked, "Nothing I ever do will be as volatile as being union president during those times." The incident forced him to miss the first three weeks of classes at Boston College Law School, where he had enrolled. Nevertheless, he graduated with a J.D. in 1991. After graduating he joined the law office of Gabriel O. Dumont, Jr., representing labor unions and unemployed workers.

Throughout law school and the following years, he often worked pro bono, representing housing project residents at Boston Housing Authority (BHA) hearings. In one high-profile 1994 case, Lynch provided free legal services to 14 teenagers, all white, who were accused of physically attacking a Hispanic teenager and harassing the family of his white girlfriend over a period of six months. Lynch claimed the youths had been "overcharged" and helped some of them avoid criminal charges and eviction by the BHA.

Lynch was a onetime tax delinquent. In the mid-1980s the city of Boston placed liens on four properties he owned due to several thousand dollars of unpaid property taxes. He owed Massachusetts $2,000 in overdue taxes from 1985 to 1988, and for several years owed the IRS $4,000.

== Massachusetts House of Representatives ==
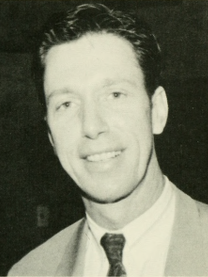
Lynch in 1995

In early 1994 he phoned Paul J. Gannon, the Democratic state representative from the 4th Suffolk district, to announce a run against him. While both candidates were labor advocates with similar backgrounds, Lynch called himself "the conservative candidate". He criticized Gannon for not supporting the Veterans Council, which had prevented a gay rights group from marching in the local St. Patrick's Day Parade, and said that this issue was the main reason he was entering the race. He described himself as against gay rights and legalized abortion. Lynch's base of supporters in the projects allowed him to win the Democratic primary by 600 votes before he went on win the general election.

As a state representative, Lynch opposed a plan by Governor Bill Weld and New England Patriots owner Robert Kraft to construct a $200 million football stadium by the publicly owned South Boston waterfront. He led the opposition to a proposed asphalt plant in South Bay, and sponsored an amendment to a state bond bill that banned its construction.

While in the state House, Lynch advocated an amendment to Massachusetts's hate crimes law that would allow people accused of homophobic crimes to use a "gay panic" defense, reducing the penalties for the offense.

== Massachusetts Senate ==
When President of the Massachusetts Senate William Bulger announced his resignation from his 1st Suffolk seat in late 1995, Lynch filed nomination papers for the special election to replace him. Bulger's son, attorney William M. Bulger, Jr., also ran for the seat, as did another lawyer, Patrick Loftus. The race grew from the grassroots of South Boston, with neighborhood issues such as development, crime, and education ruling the debate. The candidates declared their mutual respect. Lynch won the March 1996 primary, defeating Bulger Jr. and Loftus 56%–35%–9%. In April, he defeated Republican Richard William Czubinski 96%–4%, and he was inaugurated on May 1, 1996. He was reelected unopposed in 1996, 1998, and 2000.

As a state senator, Lynch continued to lead opposition to the proposed football stadium and vocally opposed a proposal to sell the publicly owned Marine Industrial Park. He opposed a hate-crimes bill that would have made racially charged language a felony, and hearkened back to the 1994 racial violence case as an example, arguing that the bill "attacks merely words" and "prosecutes young people who, in my opinion, haven't developed the responsibility and wisdom to measure their words." On the Senate Transportation Committee, Lynch cosponsored a bill in June 1996 to allow certain Boston residents unlimited access to the Ted Williams Tunnel. In 1997 he was named Senate Chairman of the Joint Committee on Commerce and Labor. In response to a budget crisis in the state's nursing homes, due primarily to Medicaid shortfalls, Lynch filed an unsuccessful bill in April 2001 to increase Medicaid funding by $200 million. While in the Senate, he enrolled at Harvard University's John F. Kennedy School of Government, from which he graduated with a master's degree in 1999. Massachusetts law prohibits any elected official from holding more than one office. Following his election to Congress, Lynch resigned on October 16, 2001 and was sworn in as a member of Congress on October 23.

== U.S. House of Representatives ==
=== Elections ===
==== 2001 ====
Lynch announced his candidacy for the 9th district seat in 2001, when longtime incumbent U.S. Representative Joe Moakley, stricken with leukemia, decided not to seek a 17th term. This was a departure from Lynch's previous plan to run for lieutenant governor of Massachusetts. Moakley died in May 2001, before his term ended, and Lynch announced a run for the special election to succeed him. The early front-runner in the race was lawyer Max Kennedy, son of U.S. Senator Robert F. Kennedy, but his withdrawal from the race in June 2001 put Lynch in the lead. The remaining candidates included eight Democrats and two Republicans. All the remaining candidates had similar political positions and according to The Boston Globe, the candidates "struggled to find areas of conflict" when debating.

Lynch's main opponents in the primary were State Senators Cheryl Jacques, Brian A. Joyce and Marc R. Pacheco. During the campaign, Lynch faced criticism as his past improprieties were uncovered, including two arrests, defaulting on student loans, and a history of tax delinquency. Gay rights advocates attacked him for "a history of supporting anti-gay legislation." Still, Lynch maintained strong local support going into the primary. As he pulled ahead in polls and fundraising, Jacques and Joyce attacked him suggesting was not supportive of civil rights.

On September 11, 2001, Lynch won the Democratic primary with 39% of the vote to Jacques's 29%. The same day, the September 11 attacks took place, which dampened the ensuing general election race between Lynch and the Republican nominee, state Senator Jo Ann Sprague. On October 16, he defeated Sprague, 65%-33%.

==== Electoral history ====
Electoral history of Stephen Lynch
Year	Office	Party	Primary			General			Result	Swing	Ref.
Year	Office	Party	Total	%	P.	Total	%	P.	Result	Swing	Ref.
1994	State House	Democratic	4,618	54.21%	1st	9,836	100%	1st	Won	Hold	
1996	State Senate	Democratic	8,519	55.88%	1st	5,657	96.24%	1st	Won	Hold	
1996	State Senate	Democratic	7,591	99.99%	1st	25,824	99.96%	1st	Won	Hold	
1998	State Senate	Democratic	10,422	100%	1st	20,544	100%	1st	Won	Hold	
2000	State Senate	Democratic	2,648	100%	1st	28,429	99.99%	1st	Won	Hold	
2001	U.S. House	Democratic	44,905	39.44%	1st	44,943	64.97%	1st	Won	Hold	
2002	U.S. House	Democratic	69,244	80.57%	1st	168,055	99.45%	1st	Won	Hold	
2004	U.S. House	Democratic	37,035	98.83%	1st	218,167	99.03%	1st	Won	Hold	
2006	U.S. House	Democratic	75,323	77.13%	1st	169,420	78.06%	1st	Won	Hold	
2008	U.S. House	Democratic	40,332	98.85%	1st	242,166	98.72%	1st	Won	Hold	
2010	U.S. House	Democratic	42,527	64.71%	1st	157,071	68.30%	1st	Won	Hold	
2012	U.S. House	Democratic	29,352	98.76%	1st	263,999	76.12%	1st	Won	Hold	
2013	U.S. Senate	Democratic	230,335	42.44%	2nd	N/A				Hold	
2014	U.S. House	Democratic	51,077	99.03%	1st	200,644	98.67%	1st	Won	Hold	
2016	U.S. House	Democratic	27,335	97.37%	1st	271,019	72.41%	1st	Won	Hold	
2018	U.S. House	Democratic	52,269	70.88%	1st	259,159	98.42%	1st	Won	Hold	
2020	U.S. House	Democratic	111,542	66.40%	1st	310,940	80.68%	1st	Won	Hold	
2022	U.S. House	Democratic	73,191	99.03%	1st	189,987	69.70%	1st	Won	Hold	
2024	U.S. House	Democratic	64,761	98.69%	1st	265,432	70.44%	1st	Won	Hold	
2026	U.S. House	Democratic	57,823	55.63%	1st	204,532	69.70%	1st	Won	Hold	
Source: Secretary of the Commonwealth of Massachusetts | Election Results

=== Tenure ===
Lynch was sworn into the 107th Congress on October 23, 2001. The ceremony had been delayed for a weekend, as the 2001 anthrax attacks had led to a shutdown of Congressional office buildings. In a press conference after his swearing-in, Lynch remarked on the unlikelihood of his career path, comparing himself to Jed Clampett of The Beverly Hillbillies. He is a moderate Democrat by Massachusetts standards, but a fairly liberal one by national standards. He generally votes more moderate on social issues and liberal on economic and environmental issues. "Calling me the least liberal member from Massachusetts is like calling me the slowest Kenyan in the Boston Marathon", he said in 2010. "It's all relative." He is strongly pro-labor and has focused on bringing manufacturing jobs to his district. He is a co-founder and co-chair of the Congressional Labor and Working Families Caucus.

Lynch's words at a rally in early 2025 attracted national attention, as he argued with constituents who called on him to consistently oppose conservative legislation, and challenged them to run to replace him. Lynch was subsequently challenged in the Democratic primary but won the party nomination.

Lynch voted with President Joe Biden's stated position 100% of the time in the 117th Congress, according to a FiveThirtyEight analysis.

=== Committee assignments ===
- Committee on Financial Services
  - Subcommittee on Capital Markets
  - Subcommittee on Digital Assets, Financial Technology and Inclusion (Ranking Member)
- Committee on Oversight and Accountability
  - Subcommittee on National Security, the Border, and Foreign Affairs
- Select Subcommittee on the Weaponization of the Federal Government

=== Caucus memberships ===
- Congressional Arts Caucus
- Afterschool Caucuses
- Congressional Equality Caucus
- Climate Solutions Caucus
- Blue Collar Caucus
- Congressional Coalition on Adoption
- Congressional Blockchain Caucus
- Congressional Wildlife Refuge Caucus
- Rare Disease Caucus

==== Economy and finance ====
Lynch has been a member of the House Financial Services Committee since his first term. According to CQ, Lynch supported President George W. Bush's agenda one-third of the time, which was average for Democratic House members. For instance, he supported the Housing and Economic Recovery Act of 2008, which addressed the subprime mortgage crisis, but opposed the Emergency Economic Stabilization Act of 2008, which created the Troubled Asset Relief Program. He supported President Barack Obama's economic agenda, including the American Recovery and Reinvestment Act of 2009 and the Dodd–Frank Wall Street Reform and Consumer Protection Act of 2010.

Lynch has focused on trade policy as a congressman. In 2002 he voted against fast track bills that gave the president the authority to negotiate trade deals without amendments by Congress. In 2007 he voted in favor of the Peru–United States Trade Promotion Agreement despite some Democratic opposition.

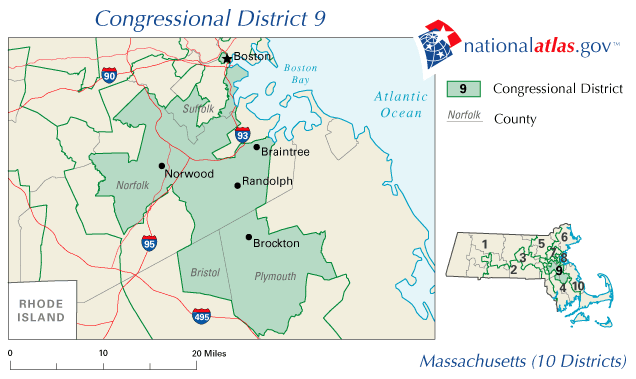
The ninth congressional district of Massachusetts in the 109th Congress. The district, numbered as the 9th district from 2001 to 2013, includes the southern fourth of Boston and many of Boston's southern suburbs, such as Brockton, Dedham, Needham, Braintree and Quincy.

==== Domestic policy ====
Lynch advocates health care reform but split with his party on Obama's health care reform efforts. He voted in November 2009 to pass the Affordable Health Care for America Act (AHCAA), the House's health care reform bill. This bill was scrapped by Congressional leaders in favor of the Senate's bill, the Patient Protection and Affordable Care Act (PPACA). Despite pressure from Obama and Democratic leaders, Lynch said he would oppose the PPACA until "they put reform back in the health reform bill." He described the Senate bill as a "surrender" to insurance companies, putting too little pressure on them to reduce costs. He explained, "There's a difference between compromise and surrender, right? And this is a complete surrender of all the things that people thought were important to health care reform." When the PPACA came to a House vote in March 2010, he was the only U.S. representative from New England to vote against it.

On social issues, Lynch was considered a conservative to moderate Democrat in the 2000s. He was anti-abortion, saying in 2001 "I'm prolife and I'm proud of it", and was criticized by the pro-choice group NARAL. He sided with conservatives in the 2005 Terri Schiavo case, voting for federal court intervention. In more recent years, he has advocated and defended funding for Planned Parenthood. In 2021, Lynch voted for the Women's Health Protection Act, signifying a significant shift in his position on the issue.

Lynch has mostly sided with Democratic leaders on gay rights issues in recent years, opposing a Federal Marriage Amendment and supporting granting medical benefits to domestic partners of federal employees. He now supports same-sex marriage. Lynch's 2022 reelection campaign touted his support for the Equality Act; he is also a member of the Congressional LGBTQ+ Equality Caucus.

In September 2016, Lynch announced on WBUR that he would vote for the November 2016 ballot question that sought to expand the number of charter schools in the state.

On January 3, 2021, the beginning of the 117th Congress, Lynch became the last remaining incumbent House Democrat to have voted against the Affordable Care Act.

In 2025, Lynch opposed the construction of 70 housing units on the lot of a vacant industrial building in the Dorchester Avenue corridor. Lynch criticized that the proposed building, which was in walking distance of Red Line stops and bus lines, did not include any parking. The developer noted that providing at least 14 parking spaces for the building would increase the cost by $75,000 per housing unit.

==== 2020 coronavirus response efforts ====
During an April 2020 House Oversight Committee Hearing that included testimony from Anthony Fauci, director of the National Institute of Allergy and Infectious Diseases, Lynch grew angry over federal miscommunications about the availability of coronavirus testing, and said that cases of COVID-19 had doubled in his district just the day before.

==== Foreign policy and veterans ====
In the wake of the September 11 attacks, the Oversight and Government Reform Committee had oversight of airport security and some elements of the War in Afghanistan. Lynch sat on the House Veterans' Affairs Committee for his first term. He has several Veterans's Affairs (VA) hospitals in his district, and sponsored legislation to increase nurse staffing and allow private physician prescriptions to be filled at VA hospitals.

A supporter of American intervention in the Middle East, Lynch has made 12 trips to Iraq and ten to Afghanistan and Pakistan. Part of these visits' purpose was to ensure accountability in reconstruction projects. He voted for the Iraq War authorization in 2002, against the Democratic House leadership, and later voted to continue funding the war. He supported Obama's drawdown of troops in Iraq throughout 2010 and 2011 and Obama's renewal of the War in Afghanistan, the only Massachusetts representative to vote for funding for Obama's Afghanistan initiative. Lynch voted for increased foreign aid to Pakistan in 2009, but, along with Oversight Chairman John F. Tierney, pushed for strict oversight of the aid's distribution.

Lynch supports lifting the United States' economic sanctions on Cuba. Moakley, his predecessor, was heavily involved in Latin American affairs, and Lynch has made an effort to continue this work. He joined five other congressmen on a 2002 visit to Cuba, where they met with President Fidel Castro.

== U.S. Senate campaigns ==
Upon the death of U.S. Senator Ted Kennedy, Massachusetts state law triggered a special election to be held in January 2010. On September 4, 2009, a representative for Lynch took out nomination papers in preparation of a special election run. After speaking with his family and citing the short time frame in which to conduct a campaign, Lynch decided not to seek the Democratic nomination for the seat.

Lynch announced his candidacy for the U.S. Senate on January 31, 2013, seeking to fill the seat then held by John Kerry, who had resigned to become U.S. Secretary of State. Lynch's candidacy in the 2013 special election had been portrayed as an uphill battle against Representative Ed Markey, who had a larger war chest and several major party endorsements. A Politico profile compared Lynch's "common-man touch" and moderate views to that of Republican Scott Brown, who won the 2010 special Senate election by connecting with independent voters. Lynch lost to Markey in the April 30 Democratic primary.

== Personal life ==
Lynch dated Margaret Shaughnessy for 10 years before the two married in 1992. An aide to state Senator Marian Walsh, Shaughnessy was from another South Boston family, one of seven children, and majored in graphic design at the Massachusetts College of Art and Design. She went to high school with Lynch's sisters, and she and Lynch were members of the South Boston Residents Group. As of 2010, the Lynches live in South Boston with their daughter and a niece. For most of his career, Lynch has been listed in the member's roll as "D-South Boston".

He is first cousins with Boston-based restaurateur Barbara Lynch.

U.S. House of Representatives
Preceded by Joe Moakley	Member of the U.S. House of Representatives from Massachusetts's 9th congressional district 2001–2013	Succeeded by William R. Keating
Preceded by Mike Capuano	Member of the U.S. House of Representatives from Massachusetts's 8th congressional district 2013–present	Incumbent
Preceded by Gerry Connolly	Ranking Member of the House Oversight Committee; Acting; 2025	Succeeded by Robert Garcia
U.S. order of precedence (ceremonial)
Preceded by Betty McCollum	United States representatives by seniority 35th	Succeeded by Joe Wilson
Preceded by Rick Larsen	Order of precedence of the United States	Succeeded by Joe Wilson
