= 2001 Massachusetts's 9th congressional district special election =

- October 16, 2001

Massachusetts's 9th congressional district
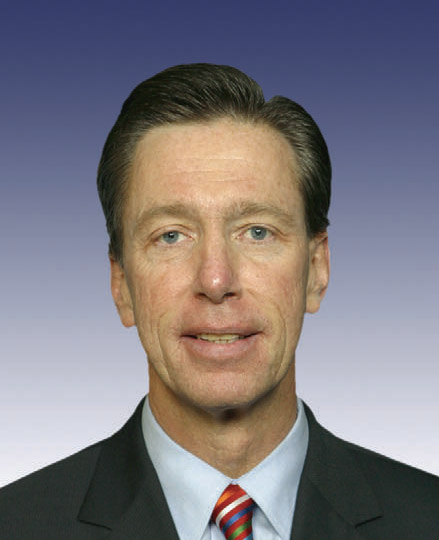

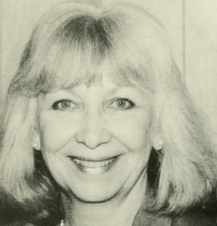
Nominee	Stephen F. Lynch	Jo Ann Sprague
Party	Democratic	Republican
Popular vote	44,943	22,645
Percentage	64.97%	32.73%
U.S. Representative before election
Joe Moakley
Democratic
Elected U.S. Representative
Stephen F. Lynch
Democratic

Massachusetts's 9th congressional district special election of 2001 was held in the U.S. state on October 16, 2001, to fill the vacancy caused by the death of Representative Joe Moakley. Democratic state senator Stephen F. Lynch won the election over Republican state senator Jo Ann Sprague.

Primary elections were held on September 11, 2001. The election was overshadowed by the September 11 attacks, which occurred shortly after polls opened.

== Background ==
Incumbent U.S. representative Joe Moakley, who was first elected in 1972, died on May 28, 2001. Primary elections to nominate candidates were scheduled for September 11, and a special election to fill the vacancy was scheduled for October 16.

== Democratic primary ==
=== Candidates ===
- William A. Ferguson Jr., activist
- Cheryl Jacques, state senator from Needham
- Stephen Lynch, state senator from South Boston
- Brian A. Joyce, state senator from Milton
- Marc Pacheco, state senator from Taunton
- William F. Sinnott, former federal prosecutor
- John E. Taylor, housing advocate

=== Results ===
Democratic primary
Party	Candidate	Votes	%	±%
Democratic	Stephen F. Lynch	44,905	39.44%	
Democratic	Cheryl Jacques	32,933	28.93%	
Democratic	Brian A. Joyce	16,818	14.77%	
Democratic	Marc R. Pacheco	15,009	13.18%	
Democratic	William F. Sinnott	3,110	2.73%	
Democratic	John E. Taylor	767	0.67%	
Democratic	William A. Ferguson, Jr.	253	0.22%	
Write-In		253	0.22%	
Total votes		114,048	100.0%	

== Republican primary ==
=== Candidates ===
- William D. McKinney, member of the Massachusetts Republican State Committee
- Jo Ann Sprague, state senator from Walpole

=== Results ===
Republican primary
Party	Candidate	Votes	%	±%
Republican	Jo Ann Sprague	9,013	68.98%	
Republican	William D. McKinney	3,789	29.00%	
Write-In		265	2.03%	
Total votes		13,076	100.0%	

== General election ==
=== Candidates ===
- Susan C. Gallagher-Long, nominee for U.S. Senate in 1996 (Conservative)
- Stephen Lynch, state senator from South Boston (Democratic)
- Brock Satter (Socialist Workers)
- Jo Ann Sprague, state senator from Walpole (Republican)

=== Results ===
General election
Party	Candidate	Votes	%	±%
Democratic	Stephen Lynch	44,943	64.97%	
Republican	Jo Ann Sprague	22,645	32.73%	
Conservative	Susan C. Gallagher-Long	827	1.20%	
Socialist Workers	Brock Satter	510	0.74%	
Write-In		253	0.37%	
Total votes		69,178	100.0%	
