= Massachusetts Senate's 1st Suffolk and Middlesex district =

American legislative district

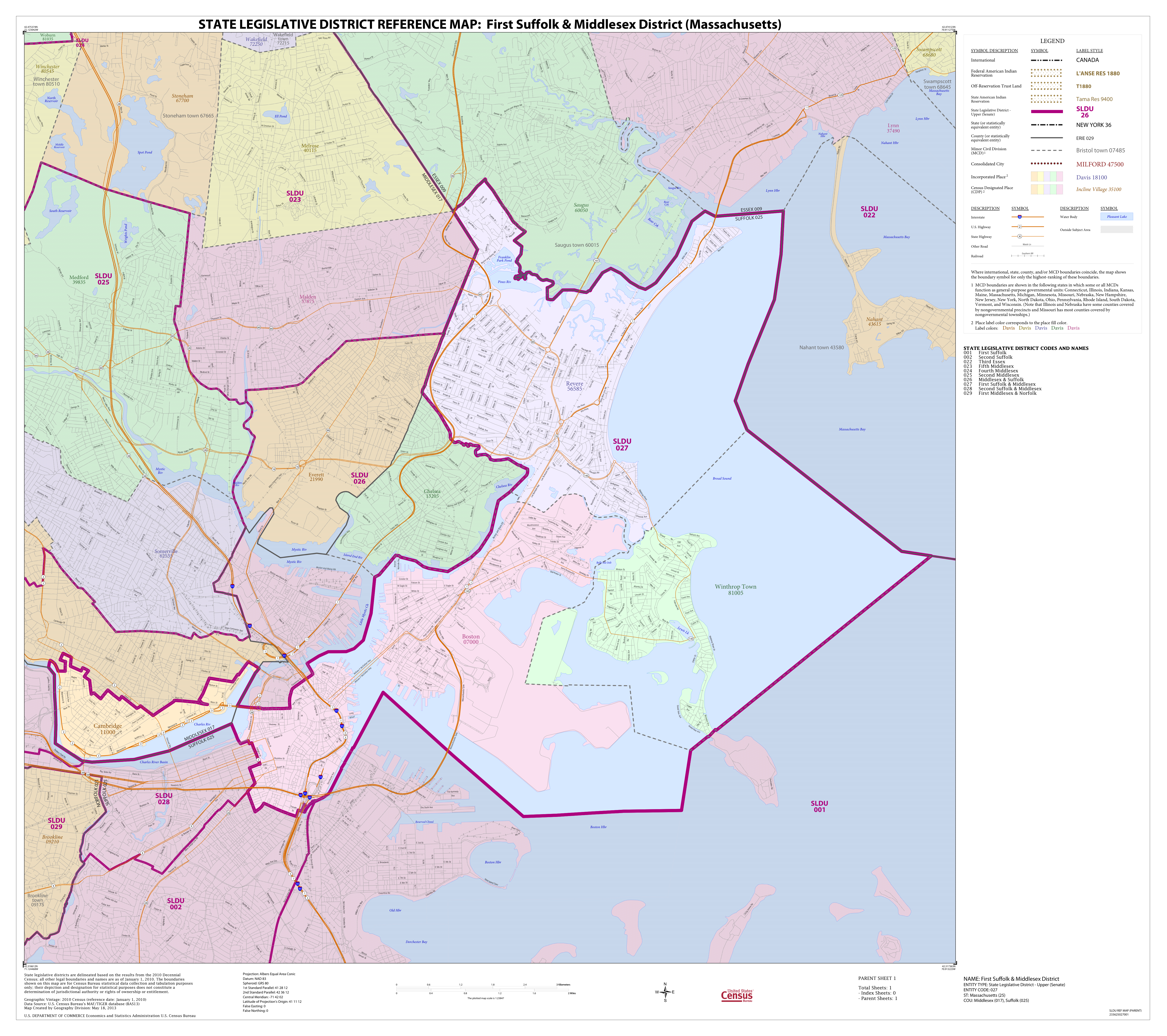
Map of Massachusetts Senate's 1st Suffolk and Middlesex district, based on the 2010 United States census.

Massachusetts Senate's 1st Suffolk and Middlesex district in the United States is one of 40 legislative districts of the Massachusetts Senate. It covers 1.5% of Middlesex County and 20.6% of Suffolk County population in 2010. Democrat Lydia Edwards has represented the district since 2022.

== Locales represented ==
The district includes the following localities:

- parts of Boston
- parts of Cambridge
- Revere
- Winthrop

As of 2016, the district had been "long known as the Eastie seat."

== Senators ==
- Michael LoPresti jr
- Anthony Petruccelli
- Robert Travaglini
- Joseph Boncore (2016–2021)
- Lydia Edwards (2022–present)

== See also ==
- List of Massachusetts Senate elections
- List of Massachusetts General Courts
- List of former districts of the Massachusetts Senate
- Middlesex County districts of the Massachusetts House of Representatives: 1st, 2nd, 3rd, 4th, 5th, 6th, 7th, 8th, 9th, 10th, 11th, 12th, 13th, 14th, 15th, 16th, 17th, 18th, 19th, 20th, 21st, 22nd, 23rd, 24th, 25th, 26th, 27th, 28th, 29th, 30th, 31st, 32nd, 33rd, 34th, 35th, 36th, 37th
- Suffolk County districts of the Massachusetts House of Representatives: 1st, 2nd, 3rd, 4th, 5th, 6th, 7th, 8th, 9th, 10th, 11th, 12th, 13th, 14th, 15th, 16th, 17th, 18th, 19th
