= Massachusetts Senate's 1st Suffolk district =

American legislative district

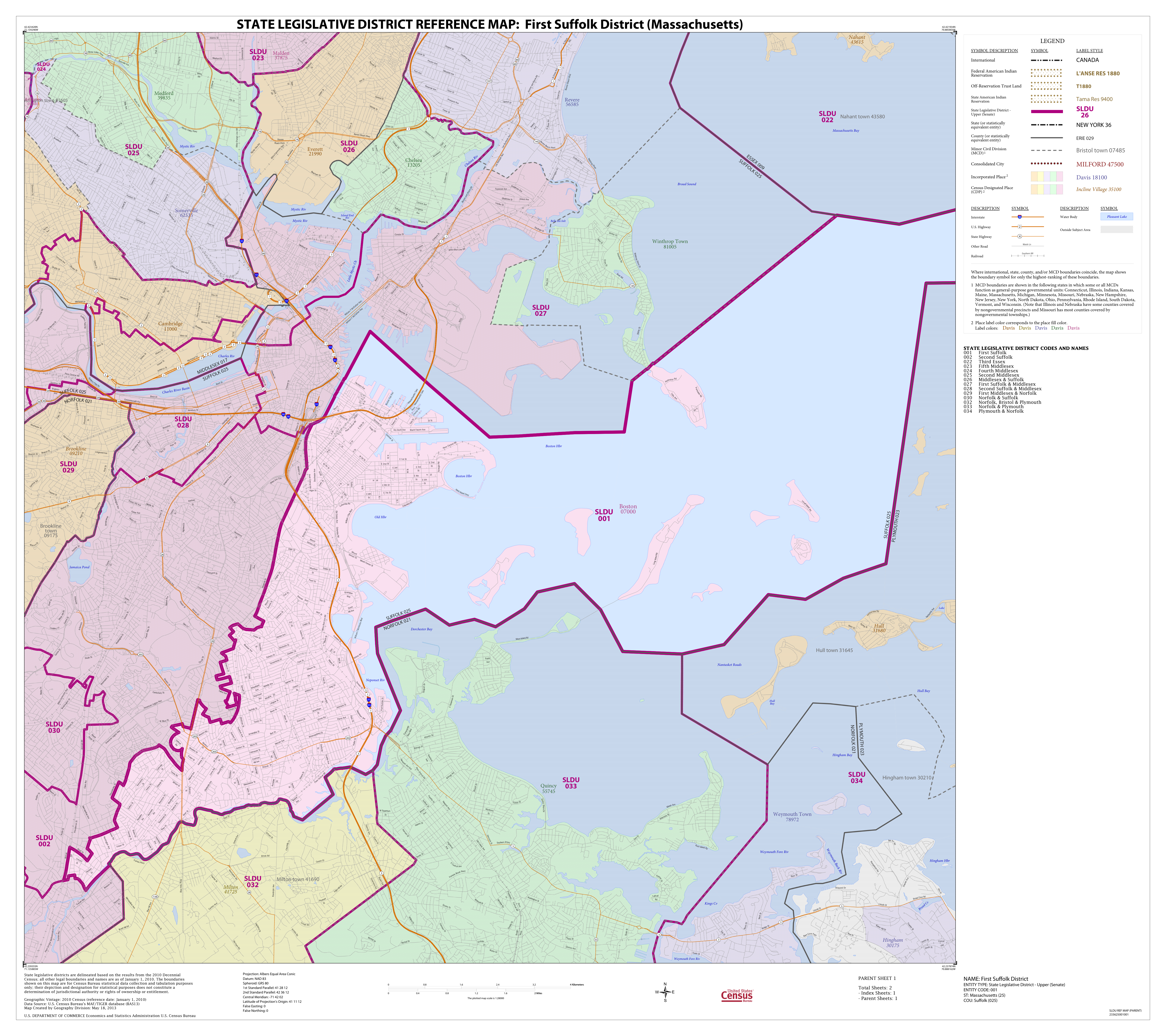
Map of Massachusetts Senate's 1st Suffolk district, based on the 2010 United States census.

Massachusetts Senate's 1st Suffolk district in the United States is one of 40 legislative districts of the Massachusetts Senate. It covers portions of Suffolk county. Democrat Nick Collins of South Boston has represented the district since 2018.

Until 2013, the district's seat had "long been regarded as the 'Southie Seat,'...held by a white, Irish-American, South Boston man."

== Locales represented ==
The district includes parts of the city of Boston.

=== Former locales ===
The district previously covered the following:

- Chelsea, circa 1860s
- North Chelsea, circa 1860s
- Winthrop, circa 1860s

== Senators ==
- Nehemiah Boynton, circa 1859
- Alfred Hall
- John Edward Beck
- Edward Cox
- John F. Donovan, circa 1935
- William R. Conley, circa 1945
- Andrew P. Quigley, 1951–1957
- Harold Wilson Canavan, circa 1957
- Joseph J. C. DiCarlo, circa 1969
- Bill Bulger, circa 1979–1993
- John A. Hart, Jr., circa 2002–2013
- Linda Dorcena Forry, circa 2013–2018
- Nick Collins, 2018–current

== Images ==
Portraits of legislators

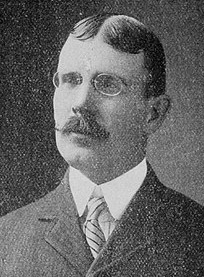
Alfred Hall

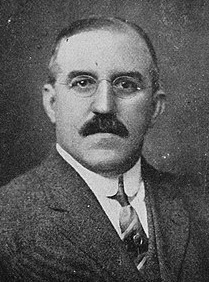
John Edward Beck

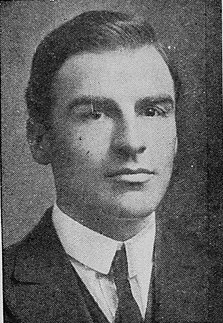
Edward Cox

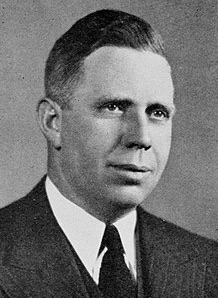
William Conley

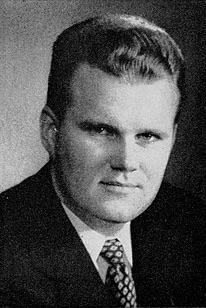
Andrew Patrick Quigley

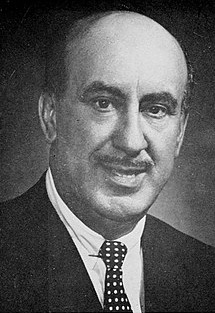
Harry Della Russo

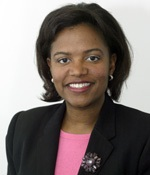
Linda Dorcena Forry

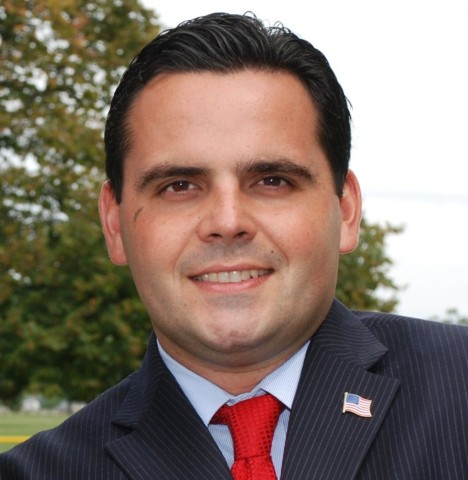
Nick Collins

== See also ==
- List of Massachusetts Senate elections
- List of Massachusetts General Courts
- List of former districts of the Massachusetts Senate
- Suffolk County districts of the Massachusetts House of Representatives: 1st, 2nd, 3rd, 4th, 5th, 6th, 7th, 8th, 9th, 10th, 11th, 12th, 13th, 14th, 15th, 16th, 17th, 18th, 19th
