= Jeremiah Joseph Sullivan =

Massachusetts politician (1905–2001)

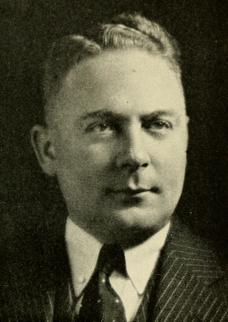

Member of the Massachusetts House of Representatives from the 4th Suffolk district
- In office 1939–1952

Personal details
- Born: March 5, 1905 Cambridge, Massachusetts, US
- Died: January 16, 2001 (aged 95) Cambridge, Massachusetts, US
- Education: Boston College (BA); Harvard Law School (LLB)

Jeremiah Joseph Sullivan (March 5, 1905 – January 16, 2001) was an American politician who was the member of the Massachusetts House of Representatives from the 4th Suffolk district.
