= Florence Cook =

Florence Cook may refer to:

- Florence Cook (Massachusetts politician), American politician
- Florence Cook (medium), English medium
