= Nick Collins (politician) =

American politician (born 1982)

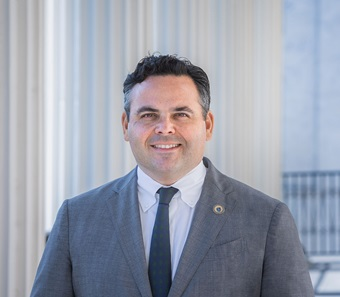
- official portrait, 2024

Member of the Massachusetts Senate from the 1st Suffolk district
- Incumbent
- Assumed office May 9, 2018
- Preceded by: Linda Dorcena Forry

Member of the Massachusetts House of Representatives from the 4th Suffolk district
- In office January 5, 2011 – May 9, 2018
- Preceded by: Brian Wallace
- Succeeded by: David Biele

Personal details
- Born: August 26, 1982 (age 44) South Boston, Massachusetts
- Party: Democratic
- Education: Babson College (BBA)

Nick Collins is an American politician who serves as a member of the Massachusetts Senate for the 1st Suffolk district. A member of the Democratic Party and a resident of Boston, Collins previously served four terms in the Massachusetts House of Representatives representing the 4th Suffolk district.

In May 2018, Collins won the election for the open Massachusetts Senate seat vacated by the resignation of Linda Dorcena Forry. He was sworn into the Massachusetts Senate on May 9, 2018 by Massachusetts Governor Charlie Baker. His district, which extends into the Dorchester and Mattapan neighborhoods of Boston, is one of three minority-majority state senate districts in Massachusetts.

As senator for the 1st Suffolk district, Collins has been the host of the annual Boston St. Patrick’s Day Breakfast since 2019, a televised political roast that has featured Presidents, Vice Presidents, United States Senators and Members of Congress throughout its history.

== Early life and education ==
Nick Collins was born and raised in South Boston with five siblings, including twin brother Andrew J. Collins He is a graduate of Boston Latin School and The Frederick Gunn School, where he played hockey. He went on to earn a bachelor's degree in business management from Babson College.

His father, James P. Collins, was a state representative from Charlestown who also worked in the administrations of Boston Mayor Kevin White and Massachusetts Governor Edward J. King. Collins’ began his career in public service as a legislative aide to Massachusetts Senator Jack Hart. He was also a regional field director for the Barack Obama 2008 presidential campaign.

== State representative ==
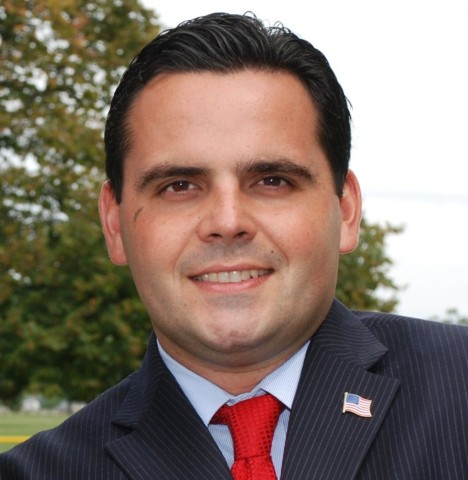
official portrait, 2011

Collins was first elected to the Massachusetts House of Representatives seat for the 4th Suffolk District in 2010. He has also served as chair of the Boston legislative delegation. Collins major legislative accomplishment in his first term was being a lead sponsor of the landmark Prescription Drug Monitoring bill signed into law by Deval Patrick on August 24, 2012.

In early 2013 incumbent State Senator Jack Hart resigned from his seat to take a job at a law firm and a special election was called in order to fill it. Three candidates entered the race: 4th Suffolk District State Rep Nick Collins; 12th Suffolk District State Rep Linda Dorcena-Forry; and 'Caught in Southie' publisher Maureen Dahill. Collins and Dahill are both white and lived in South Boston, while Dorcena-Forry is Haitian-American and lived in the Lower Mills section of Dorechster. Collins received support from a number of unions including the Greater Boston Labor Council, but not the most prominent union member in the state senate district, Savin Hill State Rep Marty Walsh, who stayed neutral in the race. Collins ultimately fell short in the April 30, 2013 Democratic Primary with the final count: Dorcena-Forry 10,220 votes, Collins 9,841 votes, and Dahill with 1,594 votes.

Later in 2013 Collins repaid Walsh's neutrality in his failed State Senate race by endorsing Walsh's opponent in the open seat race for Mayor of Boston. Collins endorsed West Roxbury resident and At-Large City Council John Connolly. While Connolly and Walsh were the top two vote getters and advanced to the general election, Connolly lost to Walsh in November 2013. Collins went on to joke about the endorsement at the Boston St. Patrick's Day Breakfast in 2014, saying that he was being sent to City Hall jail.

Collins was a founding board member of UP Academy of Dorchester and Boston and an advisory board member of Excel High School in South Boston. In March 2016, he served as chairman of the South Boston Citizens Association's Evacuation Day ceremonies. In May 2016, he was elected as a delegate for Hillary Clinton at the 2016 Democratic National Convention.

== State senator ==
In January 2018, 1st Suffolk District State Senator Linda Dorcena-Forry announced that she was resigning from office in order to take a position with Suffolk Construction, and causing another special election. Unlike the 2013 Special Election, this time Collins faced no opposition in his bid for State Senate, and he won the seat. Collins is at the 4th State Senator in a row to hold this seat who has first won it in a special election: Dorcena-Forry won the seat in a 2013 special election, Hart won the seat in a 2002 special election, and Lynch won the seat in a 1996 special. Previous State Senate President William Bulger is the last holder of the 1st Suffolk District State Senate seat to have won the election in a regularly scheduled election.

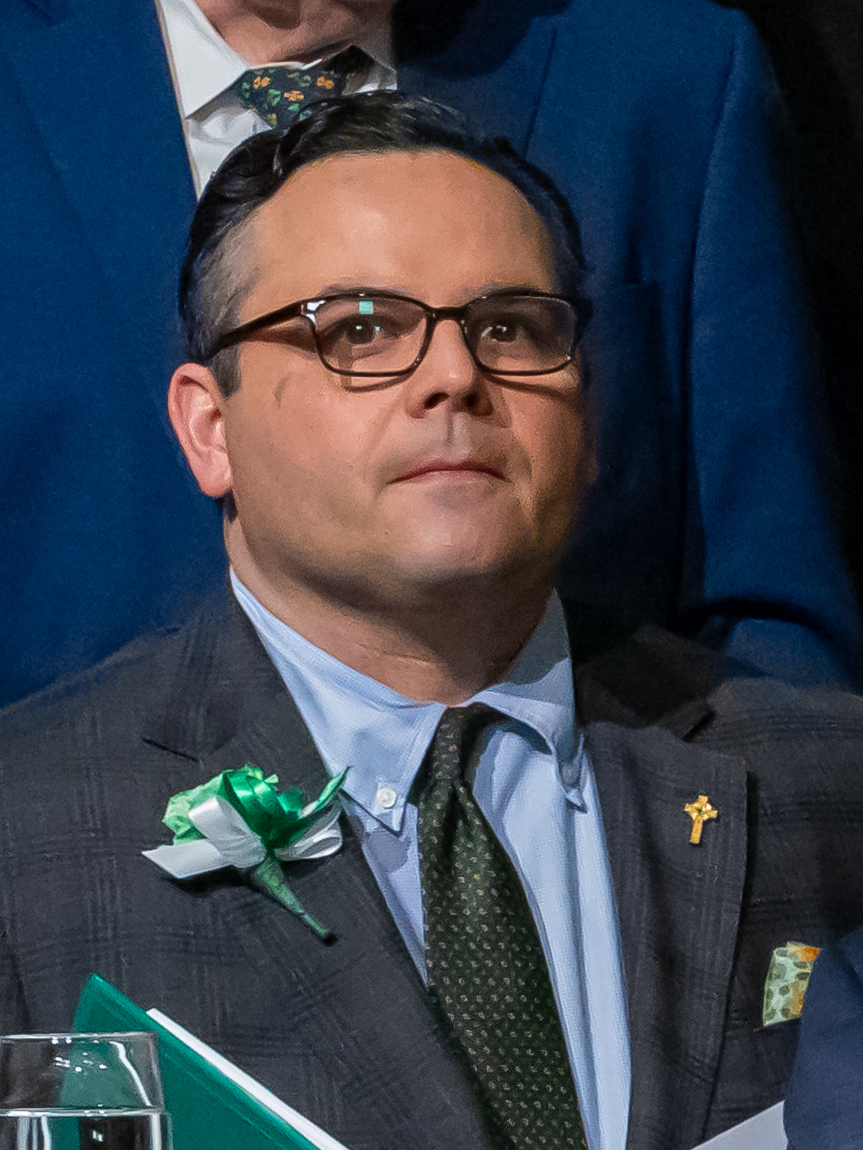
Collins during the 2024 Boston St. Patrick’s Day Breakfast

Upon assuming office in the Senate in 2018, Collins was named the host of the annual Boston St. Patrick’s Day Breakfast, hosting his first breakfast in 2019. He moved the breakfast in his first year of hosting to the Flynn Cruiseport Boston and created a theme for the event that focused on the contribution of the immigrant community to the South Boston Waterfront and the city of Boston. Vice-President Joe Biden sent a video message in to the event.

In the Massachusetts Senate, Collins serves on several committees, including chair of the Joint Committee on Export Development; vice-chair of the Senate Committee on Bonding, Capital Expenditures and State Assets; vice-chair of the Committee on Public Health; Senate Ways and Means; the Joint Committee on State Administration and Regulatory Oversight; the Joint Committee on Tourism, Arts and Cultural Development; the Joint Committee on Veterans Affairs; and the Joint Committee on Ways and Means.

In 2020, as the COVID-19 pandemic hit, Collins worked with community leaders and organized the donation of thousands of masks to COVID-19 hospitals, community health centers, senior living facilities and other locations. In the legislature he advanced several bills aimed at increasing racial and gender diversity in state contracting projects and addressing system injustice, partnering with 11th Hampden District State Rep Bud Williams of Springfield on an economic equity bill aimed at addressing systemic injustice and racial equity in government, business, public health and the courts. He also filed in another bill aimed to improve economic equality and reduce the racial wealth gap in Massachusetts by requiring diversity of race and gender on all development projects on state land. The bill was inspired by the success of the Omni Seaport Hotel, a $550 million development, which included diversity requirements not only for vendors, but also for ownership and financing. Dubbed the “Massport Model,” the legislation was included in a State Senate's economic development package, requires diversity in ownership, as well as construction, design, financing and management on state projects.

Collins was the subject of intense scrutiny when he became one of only a handful of Democrats and the only State Senator representing a minority-majority district to vote against the State Senate's version of a far-reaching police reform bill in 2020, joining 6 of his colleagues in a 30–7 vote. He called the bill’s most controversial element — a provision imposing new limits on the protection police officers enjoy from civil lawsuits — “problematic,” and cited that as the reason for his opposition to the bill. Collins ultimately voted for the compromise bill that became law later in 2020.

Collins considered running for Mayor when incumbent Boston Mayor Marty Walsh resigned in early 2021 to become the US Secretary of Labor under newly elected President Joseph R. Biden. Collins ultimately decided against it, releasing a short statement in late April 2021 that read:

“After much encouragement and consideration and discussions with family, I’ve decided I will not be a candidate for mayor. I remain dedicated to my job in the Massachusetts Senate and working with leadership and my colleagues on our shared priorities to help Boston and the Commonwealth grow and thrive. I look forward to working closely with City Hall to create a better Boston for all.”

In 2024, Senator Collins caused controversy when he blocked a City of Boston proposal intended to mitigate a spike in residential property tax increases that occurred as result of a post-pandemic decline in real estate values.

=== Committee assignments ===
- Chairperson, Joint Committee on State Administration and Regulatory Oversight
- Vice Chair, Senate Committee on Post Audit and Oversight
- Vice Chair, Joint Committee on Economic Development and Emerging Technologies
- Senate Committee on Bills in the Third Reading
- Senate Committee on Ways and Means
- Joint Committee on Community Development and Small Businesses
- Joint Committee on Mental Health, Substance Use and Recovery
- Joint Committee on Veterans and Federal Affairs
- Joint Committee on Ways and Means

== Personal life ==
Collins lives in South Boston with his wife Dr. Olivia J. Liff, a board-certified family physician. They have two daughters.

== See also ==
- 2019–2020 Massachusetts legislature
- 2021–2022 Massachusetts legislature
- 2023–2024 Massachusetts legislature
