= David Biele =

Massachusetts politician

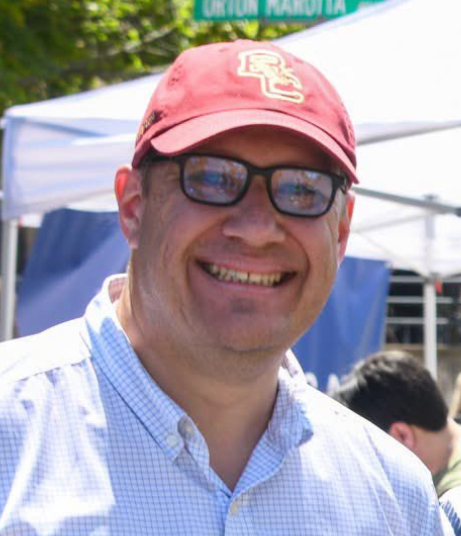

Member of the Massachusetts House of Representatives from the 4th Suffolk district
- Incumbent
- Assumed office January 2, 2019
- Preceded by: Nick Collins

Personal details
- Party: Democratic Party
- Education: Boston College Law School

David Biele is an American politician and attorney who serves as a member of the Massachusetts House of Representatives for the 4th Suffolk district. A Democrat, his district includes South Boston, part of Dorchester, and the Boston Harbor Islands.

== Political career ==
In 2018, Biele won the Democratic primary for the 4th Suffolk district after Representative Nick Collins, for whom he had served as an aide, was elected to the Massachusetts Senate in a special election. He ran with the endorsement of Collins and former State Senator Linda Dorcena Forry. Biele was unopposed in the 2018 general election and has been unopposed in all subsequent elections as of 2024.

=== Committee assignments ===
- Vice Chair, Joint Committee on Financial Services
- House Committee on Ways and Means
- Joint Committee on Aging and Independence
- Joint Committee on Emergency Preparedness and Management
- Joint Committee on Ways and Means

== See also ==
- 2019–2020 Massachusetts legislature
- 2021–2022 Massachusetts legislature
