= Carlo Basile =

American politician

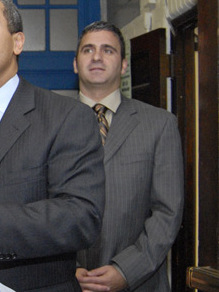
- Basile in 2007

Member of the Massachusetts House of Representatives from the 1st Suffolk district
- In office November 1, 2007 – January 7, 2015
- Preceded by: Anthony Petruccelli
- Succeeded by: Adrian Madaro

Personal details
- Born: Carlo P. Basile; June 29, 1971 (age 55) East Boston, Massachusetts, United States of America
- Party: Democratic
- Children: Carlo A. and Christian
- Education: Suffolk University

Carlo P. Basile (born June 29, 1971, in East Boston) is an American politician. Basile is currently a Consultant at the Boston-based law firm Smith, Costello, and Crawford.

== Career ==
A native of East Boston, Basile graduated from Savio Preparatory High School and then moved on to Suffolk University, where he earned a Bachelor of Science in Criminal Justice. He served in the Massachusetts House of Representatives from 2007 to 2015. In 2015, Basile was named Deputy Chief of Staff for the administration of Massachusetts Governor Charlie Baker.

Basile was described in 2013 by Andrew Ryan of The Boston Globe as, "an East Boston powerbroker with a potent political organization".

== See also ==
- 2007–2008 Massachusetts legislature
- 2009–2010 Massachusetts legislature
- 2011–2012 Massachusetts legislature
- 2013–2014 Massachusetts legislature
