= Anthony Petruccelli =

American politician

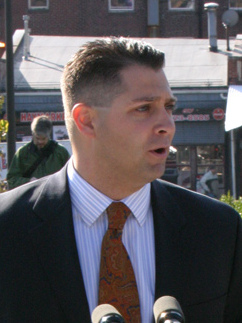
- Petruccelli in 2007

Member of the Massachusetts Senate from the 1st Suffolk and Middlesex district
- In office July 2007 – January 2016
- Preceded by: Robert Travaglini
- Succeeded by: Joseph Boncore

Member of the Massachusetts House of Representatives from the 1st Suffolk district
- In office June 1999 – July 2007
- Preceded by: Emanuel Gus Serra
- Succeeded by: Carlo Basile

Personal details
- Born: October 2, 1972 (age 54) East Boston, Massachusetts
- Party: Democratic
- Spouse: Alessandra (née Coppola)
- Children: Alexa and Anthony
- Education: University of Rochester
- Occupation: Legislator
- Website: Official site

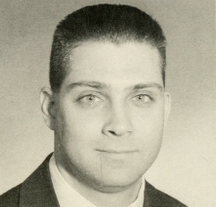
Early official portrait

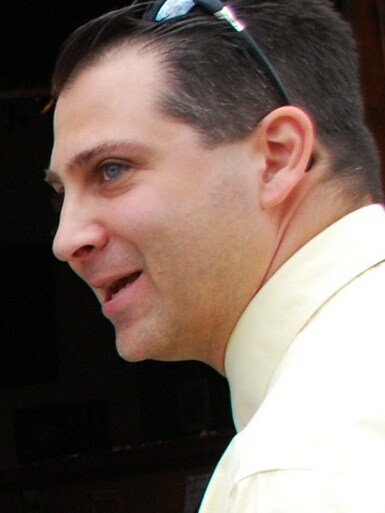
Petrucelli in 2010

Anthony W. Petruccelli (born October 2, 1972) is an American politician who served as a Massachusetts state senator for the First Suffolk and Middlesex district, which includes his neighborhood of East Boston and parts of Revere, Winthrop, and Cambridge. He is a Democrat who served from 2007 to 2016. In 2016, Petrucelli left the Senate to join a Boston lobbying firm. Prior to serving in the Senate, he was a state representative from 1999 to 2007. Petruccelli was born and raised in East Boston, parents are Richard and Dianne (Tanner) Petruccelli. He is one of four children, Richard, Debra and Diana. He attended East Boston Central Catholic School, Boston Latin, and Boston College High School, where he was a 3 sport varsity athlete. He attended and played football at the University of Rochester in Rochester, NY. Upon completing 4 years at the University of Rochester, he returned home where he served as a Community Liaison for the East Boston Neighborhood to Mayor Thomas Menino.

He is currently living in East Boston with his wife, Alessandra (Coppola), and his two children Alexa and Anthony.
