= Joseph Boncore =

American lawyer and member of the Massachusetts Senate

Joe Boncore
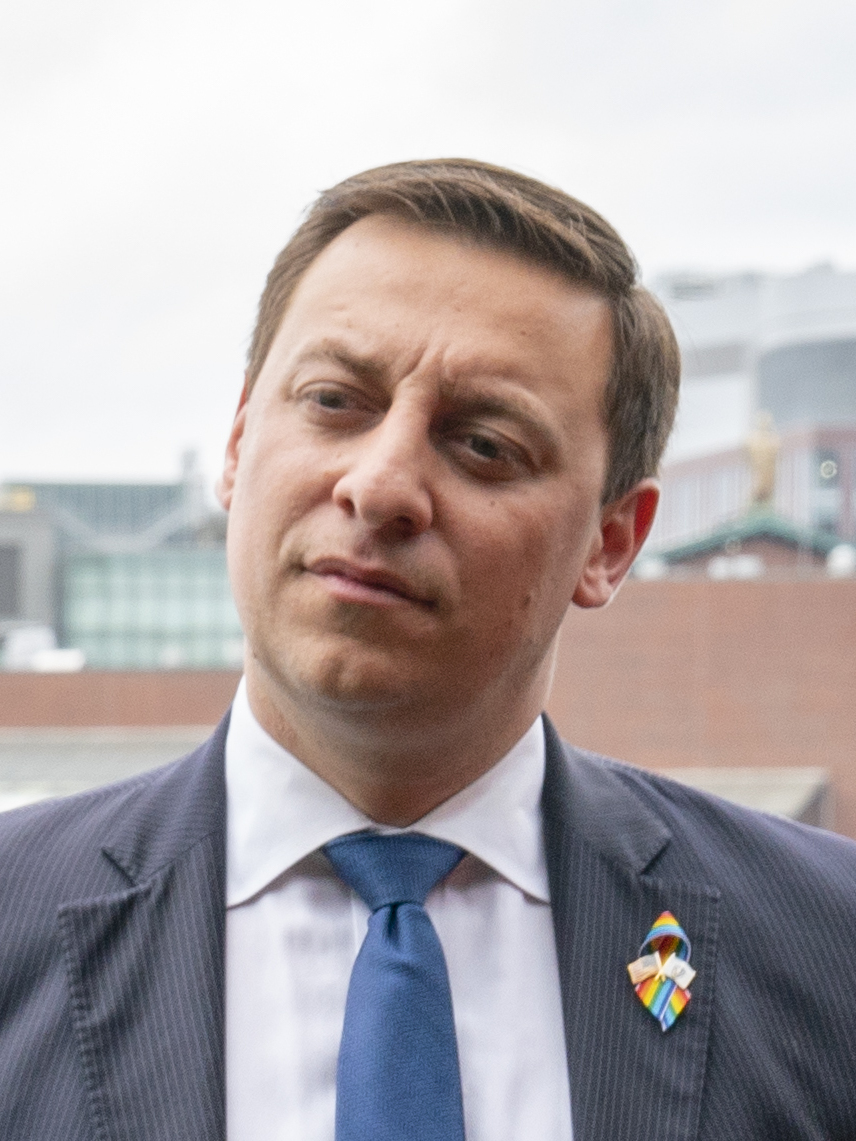
- Boncore in 2018

Member of the Massachusetts Senate from the 1st Suffolk and Middlesex district
- In office May 18, 2016 – September 9, 2021
- Preceded by: Anthony Petruccelli
- Succeeded by: Lydia Edwards

Personal details
- Born: June 27, 1982 (age 44) Cambridge, Massachusetts, U.S.
- Party: Democratic
- Education: Providence College Massachusetts School of Law

Joseph A. Boncore is an American lawyer from Winthrop, Massachusetts, who was elected to the Massachusetts Senate in 2016 from the First Suffolk and Middlesex District. He resigned in September 2021 to become CEO of the Massachusetts Biotechnology Council. He is a member of the Democratic Party.

== Education ==
Boncore attended high school at St. John's Preparatory School in Danvers, Massachusetts. He graduated from Providence College and from the Massachusetts School of Law.

== Early career ==
=== Law career ===
Since being admitted to the bar Boncore has worked in his family's legal firm, Boncore Law Practice, and for three years as a public defender with Suffolk Lawyers for Justice, serving indigent criminal defendants.

=== Winthrop Housing Authority ===
Boncore joined the Winthrop Housing Authority Board of Commissioners in 2009 and later became chairman of the board.

== Political career ==
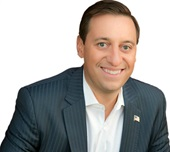
Official portrait

Following the resignation of Senator Anthony Petruccelli in 2016, Boncore declared his candidacy for the now open First Suffolk and Middlesex state Senate seat. He secured the Democratic nomination after beating seven other candidates and was unopposed in both the May 10th special election and the November 8th general election.

== See also ==
- 2019–2020 Massachusetts legislature
- 2021–2022 Massachusetts legislature
