= Dan Cullinane =

American politician

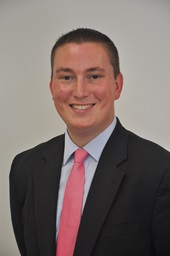

Member of the Massachusetts House of Representatives from the 12th Suffolk district
- In office September 25, 2013 – December 13, 2020
- Preceded by: Linda Dorcena Forry
- Succeeded by: Brandy Fluker Oakley

Personal details
- Born: Daniel R. Cullinane
- Party: Democratic

Daniel R. Cullinane is an American politician formerly serving in the Massachusetts House of Representatives from September 2013 to December 2020. He is a Boston resident from the neighborhood of Dorchester and a member of the Massachusetts Democratic Party. Cullinane resigned on December 13, 2020, to become a lobbyist at Kearney, Donovan & McGee.

== See also ==
- 2019–2020 Massachusetts legislature
