= Adrian Madaro =

Massachusetts politician

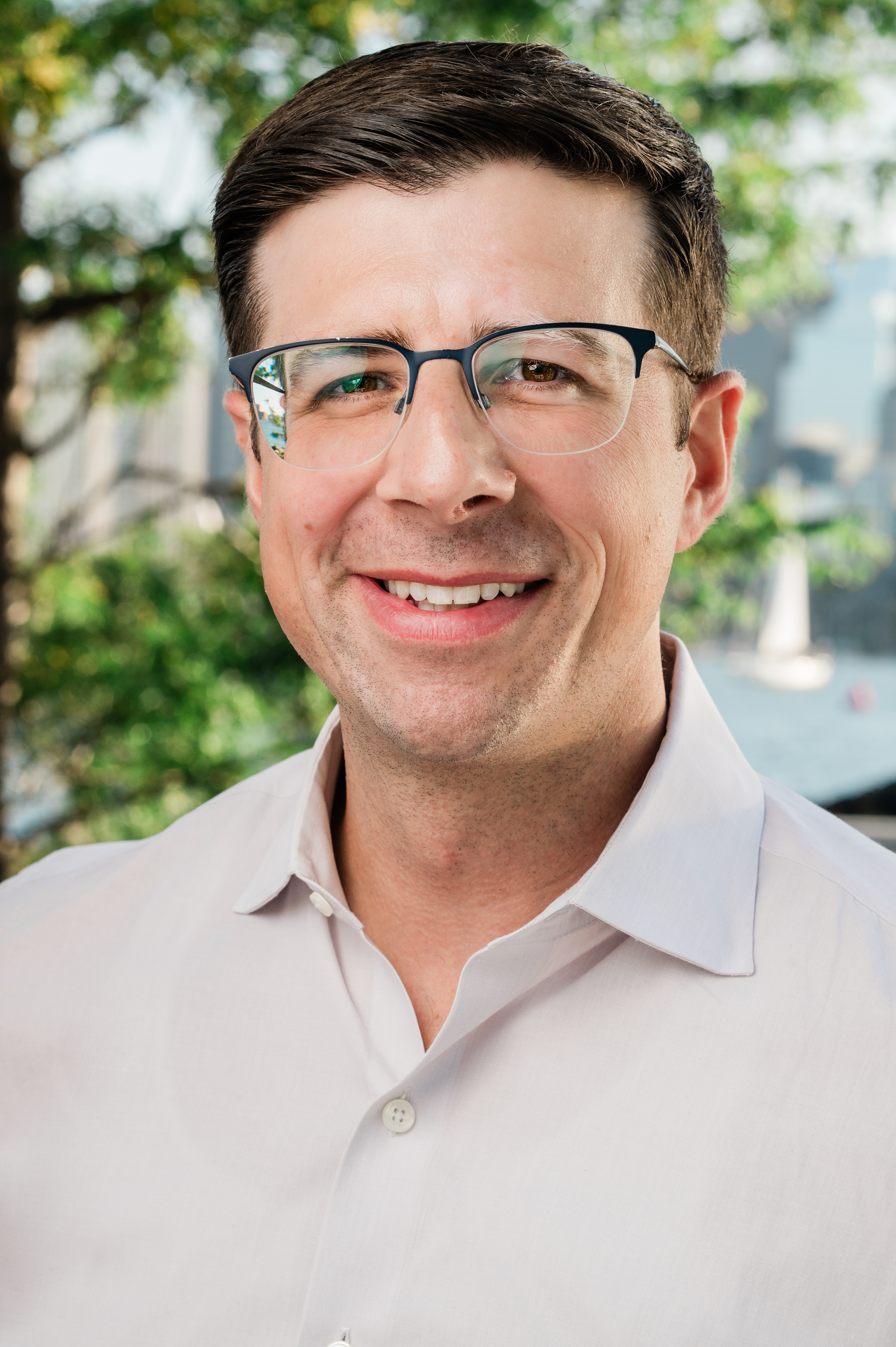
- Madaro in 2025

Member of the Massachusetts House of Representatives from the 1st Suffolk district
- Incumbent
- Assumed office April 8, 2015
- Preceded by: Carlo Basile

Personal details
- Born: November 2, 1988 (age 37) Boston, Massachusetts
- Party: Democratic
- Spouse: Ariel Glantz (m. 2017)
- Education: Tufts University (BA, MA); Suffolk University (JD)
- Website: https://www.adrianmadaro.com

Adrian C. Madaro (born November 2, 1988) is a State Representative who represents the 1st Suffolk District in the Massachusetts House of Representatives. He represents the East Boston neighborhood of the City of Boston.

== Biography ==
Madaro was born in Boston and graduated from Boston Latin School. He earned his bachelor's degree from Tufts University.

Upon graduation from college, he served as a legislative aide to Carlo Basile, whose seat Madaro would later be elected to himself. While serving as an aide, he obtained his Master of Arts degree, also from Tufts University, in urban and environmental policy and planning. In 2019, while serving as a Representative, he obtained his law degree from Suffolk University Law School.

== Political career ==
In 2015, Madaro ran in a special election for the 1st Suffolk seat, to replace Carlo Basile, who had resigned to serve in another government post. Madaro won a five-way Democratic primary with 42.1% of the vote, and went on to win the general election with just over 90% of the vote. Since then, he has run for re-election unopposed.

Madaro's committee assignments have varied. In the 194th Session, Madaro is serving as the House Chair for the Joint Committee on Revenue.

== See also ==
- 2019–2020 Massachusetts legislature
- 2021–2022 Massachusetts legislature
