= Jo Ann Sprague =

American politician (born 1931)

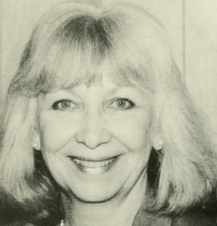

Member of the Massachusetts Senate
- In office 1999–2004
- Preceded by: William R. Keating
- Succeeded by: James E. Timilty
- Constituency: Norfolk, Bristol and Plymouth district (1999–2002); Bristol and Norfolk district (2003–2004)

Member of the Massachusetts House of Representatives from the 9th Norfolk district
- In office 1993–1999
- Preceded by: Francis H. Woodward
- Succeeded by: Scott Brown

Personal details
- Born: November 3, 1931 (age 94) Nashville, Tennessee
- Party: Republican
- Occupation: Legislator

Jo Ann Allen Sprague (born November 3, 1931) is a former Massachusetts State Representative (1993–1998) and State Senator (1999–2004) from Walpole. In the Massachusetts Senate she represented the Norfolk, Bristol, and Plymouth district, but moved in 2003 to the Bristol and Norfolk district. Previously she was a State Representative from the 9th Norfolk district. She is a member of the Republican Party.

== Biography ==
Sprague was born in Nashville, Tennessee as Jo Ann Allen. As a child, her family moved around the country, including Houston and Birmingham, Alabama. She graduated from Ramsey Technical High School in 1949.

In 1950, she enlisted in the Women's Army Corps. She met her husband, Warren, a young military policeman, while stationed at Second Army Headquarters in Fort Meade, Maryland, and married in 1952. Due to her husband's sales job, they moved frequently but ended up in Walpole, MA in 1962. She was elected to the town's Representative Town Meeting in 1970.

She graduated from the University of Massachusetts Boston in 1980 with a B.A. in classical studies. She served as a selectman in Walpole, Massachusetts from 1977 to 1980, a member of the Walpole Capital Budget committee from 1980 to 1992, a member of the Walpole Republican Town Committee. She was elected to the Massachusetts House of Representatives and served from 1993 to 1998, then served in the Massachusetts Senate from 1999 to 2004. She ran for the United States House of Representatives in 2001 to represent Massachusetts's 9th congressional district, but lost to Democratic opponent Stephen Lynch.

Massachusetts House of Representatives
Preceded by Francis H. Woodward	Member of the Massachusetts House of Representatives from the 9th Norfolk district 1993–1999	Succeeded by Scott Brown
Massachusetts Senate
Preceded by Bill Keating	Member of the Massachusetts Senate from the Norfolk, Bristol and Plymouth district 1999–2003	Succeeded by Brian A. Joyce
Preceded by Constituency established	Member of the Massachusetts Senate from the Bristol and Norfolk district 2003–2005	Succeeded by James E. Timilty
