= Brandy Fluker-Reid =

American politician

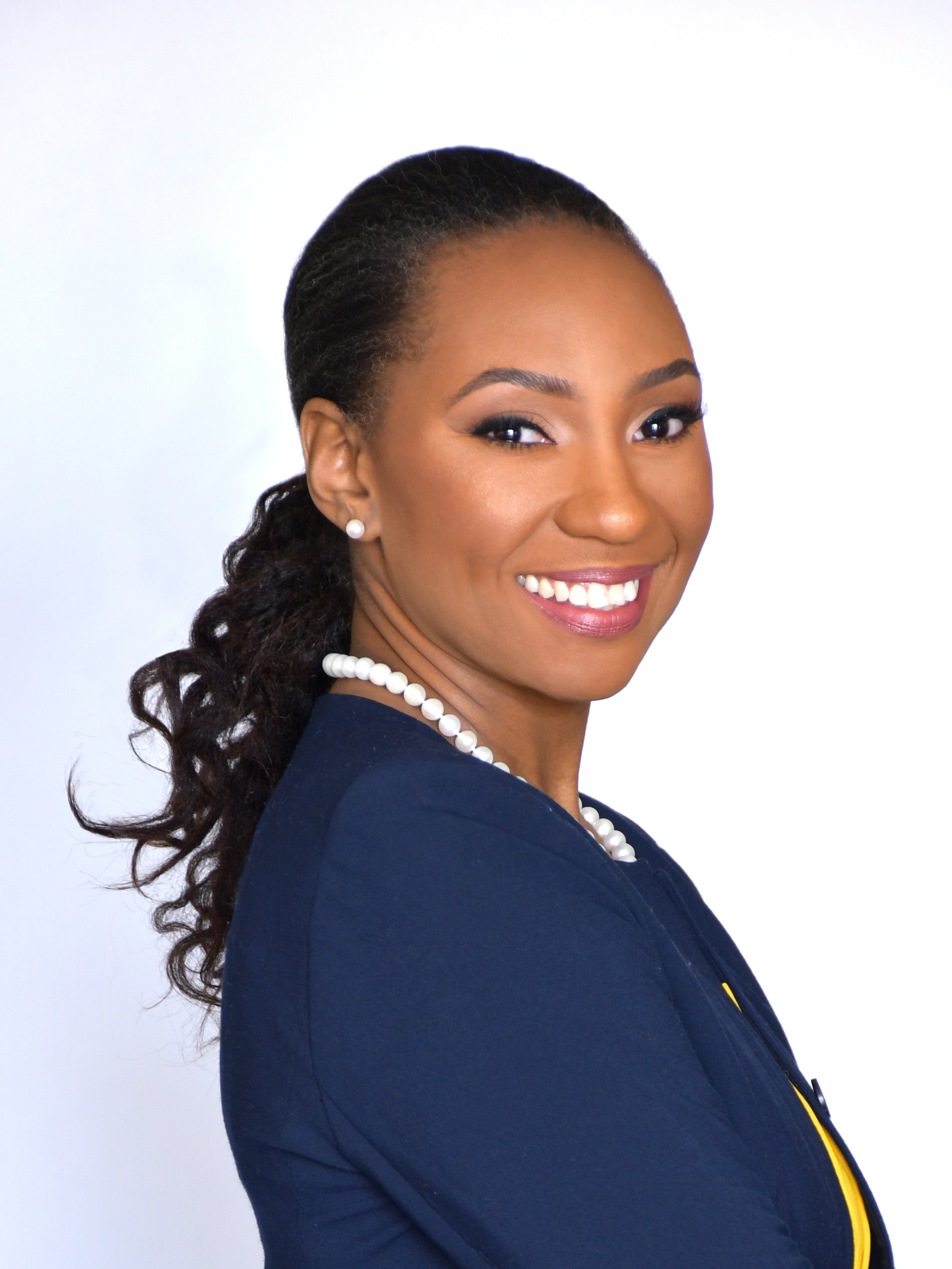
- Fluker-Reid in 2020

Member of the Massachusetts House of Representatives from the 12th Suffolk district
- Incumbent
- Assumed office January 6, 2021
- Preceded by: Dan Cullinane

Personal details
- Party: Democratic
- Education: Syracuse University (BA); Emory University (JD)

Brandy Fluker-Reid (née Fluker Oakley) is an American politician serving as the State Representative for Massachusetts' 12th Suffolk State House district since 2021. Her district includes part of Milton in Norfolk County, as well as the Boston neighborhoods of Dorchester, Hyde Park, Mattapan and Roslindale in Suffolk county. She is a member of the Democratic Party.

== Personal life ==
Fluker-Reid was born Brandy Fluker Oakley, the only child of Rev. Brenda A. Fluker, Esq. and the middle child of Joseph G. Oakley. She grew up in Boston, Massachusetts, and attended the Boston Latin School.

She later attended Syracuse University, where she obtained bachelor's degrees in both social work and policy studies. She taught-third grade as a member of the Baltimore Teachers’ Union before enrolling in law school at Emory University. Fluker-Reid became a public defender with the Committee for Public Counsel Services in the Boston Municipal and Chelsea District Courts.

On December 31, 2024, Fluker-Reid married real estate developer Omar Reid.

== Political career ==
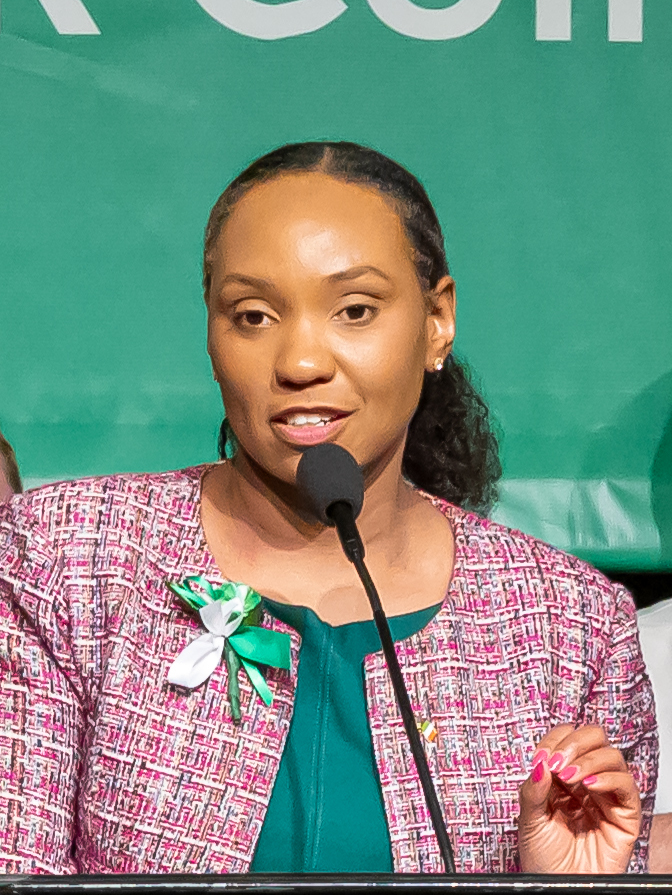
Fluker-Reid speaking at the South Boston St. Patrick's Day Breakfast in 2024

Fluker-Reid won the Democratic Party's primary election for Massachusetts House of Representatives 12th District on September 1, 2020. She ran unopposed in the general election on November 3, 2020. She replaced Democrat Dan Cullinane, who represented the 12th Suffolk district for seven years. She is a member of the women's caucus and the Massachusetts Black and Latino Legislative Caucus.

== Committee Assignments ==
For the 2025-26 Session, Fluker-Reid sits on the following committees in the House:

- Vice Chair, Joint Committee on the Judiciary
- House Committee on Operations, Facilities and Security
- Joint Committee on Cannabis Policy

== See also ==
- 2021–2022 Massachusetts legislature

== Sources ==
- https://www.electbrandy.com/meet-brandy
- https://malegislature.gov/Legislators/Profile/BFO1/Bills
- https://www.baystatebanner.com/2020/09/02/brandi-fluker-oakley-wins-12th-suffolk-primary/
- https://apps.bostonglobe.com/metro/graphics/2021/02/nr-apps-black-history-month/
- https://www.dotnews.com/2021/committee-assignments-allotted-dot-delegation
