= Massachusetts House of Representatives' 12th Suffolk district =

American legislative district

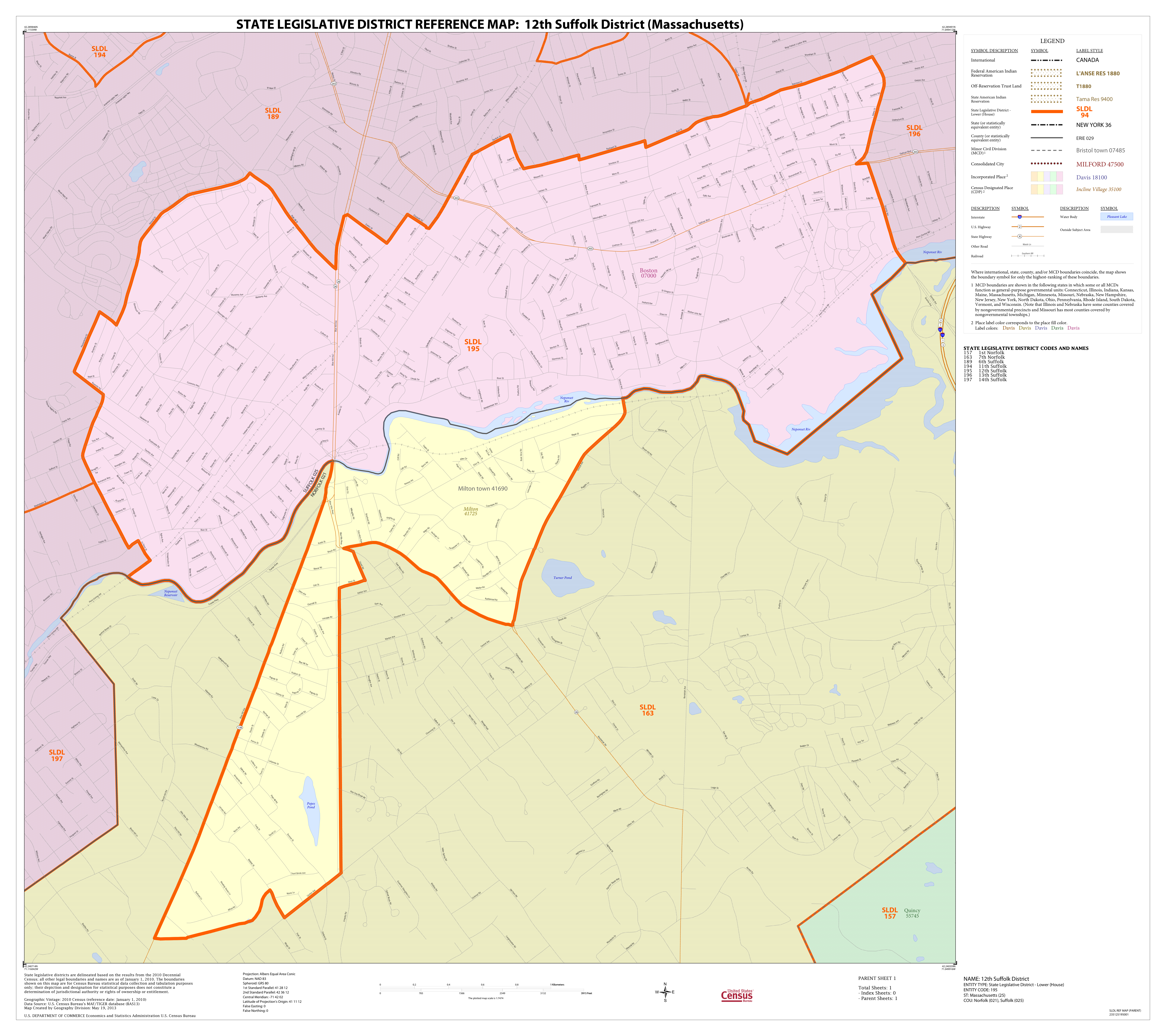
Map of Massachusetts House of Representatives' 12th Suffolk district, based on the 2010 United States census.

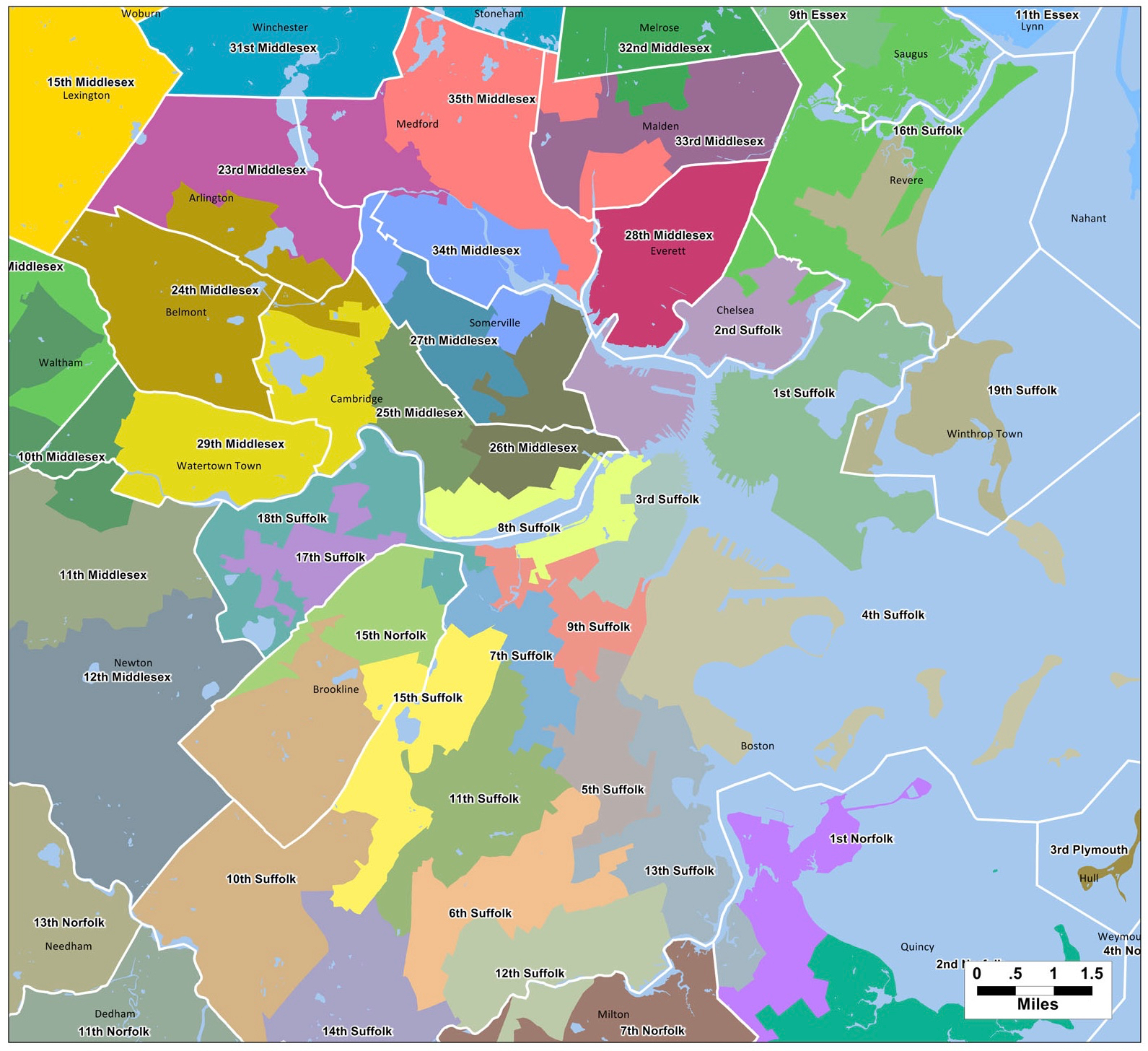
Map of Massachusetts House of Representatives districts for Suffolk County, apportioned in 2011

Massachusetts House of Representatives' 12th Suffolk district in the United States is one of 160 legislative districts included in the lower house of the Massachusetts General Court. It covers part of Milton in Norfolk County and part of Boston in Suffolk County. Democrat Brandy Fluker Oakley of Dorchester has represented the district since 2020.

The current district geographic boundary overlaps with those of the Massachusetts Senate's Norfolk, Bristol and Plymouth district, 1st Suffolk district, and 2nd Suffolk district.

== Representatives ==
- Thomas Leavitt, circa 1858
- Benjamin Lewis, circa 1858-1859
- Edward Young, circa 1858
- Daniel Hall, circa 1859
- Judah Sears, circa 1859
- Denis J. Quinn, circa 1888
- Philip Henry Quinn, circa 1888
- Daniel J. Gillen, circa 1920
- Florence Cook, 1943-1946
- Thomas Martin Joyce, circa 1920
- Philip Aloysius Chapman, circa 1951
- Thomas J. Hannon, 1955–1957
- Robert H. Quinn, 1957–1965
- John G. Kelleher, circa 1975
- Thomas Finneran, 1995–2004
- Linda Dorcena Forry, 2005 - June 14, 2013
- Dan Cullinane, 2013-2020
- Brandy Fluker Oakley, 2021–present

== See also ==
- List of Massachusetts House of Representatives elections
- Other Suffolk County districts of the Massachusetts House of Representatives: 1st, 2nd, 3rd, 4th, 5th, 6th, 7th, 8th, 9th, 10th, 11th, 13th, 14th, 15th, 16th, 17th, 18th, 19th
- List of Massachusetts General Courts
- List of former districts of the Massachusetts House of Representatives

== Images ==
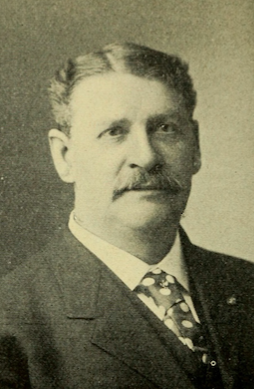
George Lovett

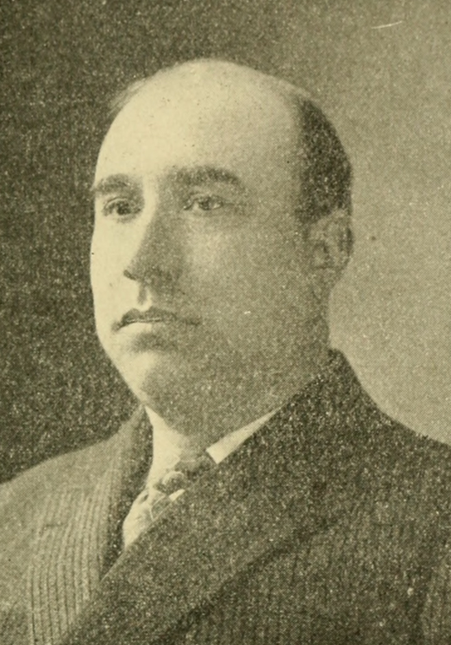
William Chester

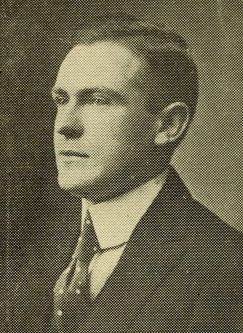
Daniel Gillen

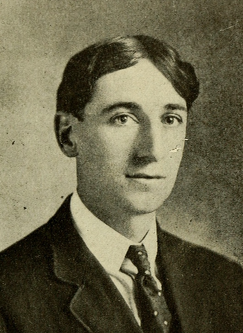
Thomas Joyce

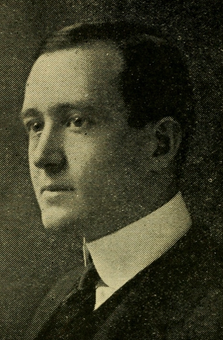
John Drew

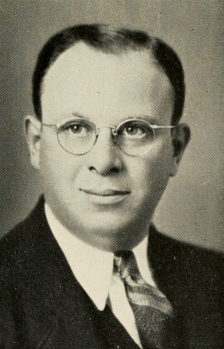
Abraham Zimon

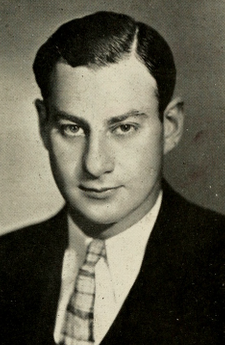
Samuel Cohen

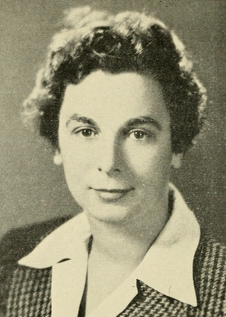
Florence Cook

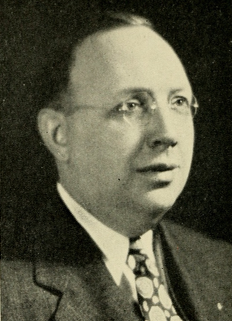
George Greene

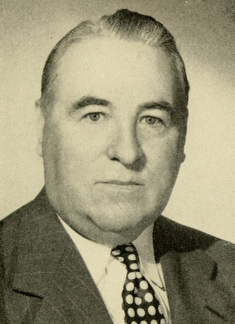
Philip Aloysius Chapman

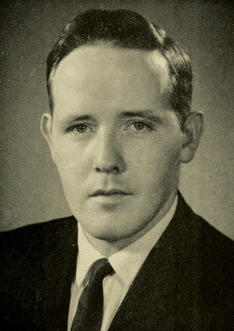
John Finnegan

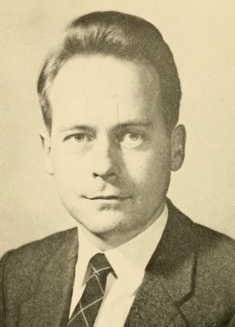
Paul Murphy

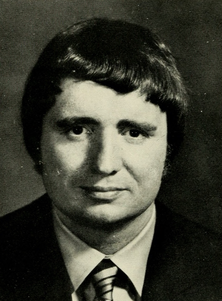
John Kelleher

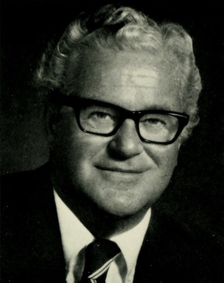
James Craven

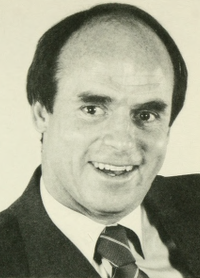
Thomas Finneran

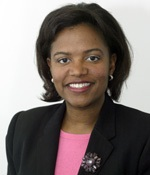
Linda Dorcena Forry

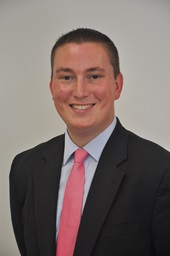
Dan Cullinane

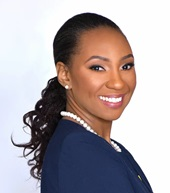
Brandy Fluker Oakley
