= Jack Hart (politician) =

American politician (born 1961)

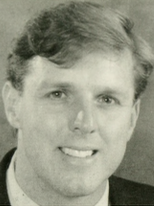
- Hart in 1999

Member of the Massachusetts Senate from the 1st Suffolk district
- In office 2002–2013
- Preceded by: Stephen Lynch
- Succeeded by: Linda Dorcena Forry

Personal details
- Party: Democratic
- Education: Tufts University
- Website: jackhart.org

John A. Hart., Jr. (born April 21, 1961) is an American lawyer and former state legislator who served as a Democratic member of the Massachusetts Senate from 2002 to 2013. He was educated at Boston College High School, Worcester Academy, Tufts University (B.A.), and Harvard Kennedy School at Harvard University (M.P.A.). Hart also graduated from New England Law - Boston (J.D.).

Hart was elected to the Massachusetts Senate in 2002 by a special election to fill the First Suffolk Senate Seat. Prior to his election to the State Senate, he served as a State Representative in the Massachusetts House of Representatives from 1996 to 2002. He resigned from the legislature in 2013 to join a private law firm.
