= Massachusetts House of Representatives' 1st Suffolk district =

American legislative district

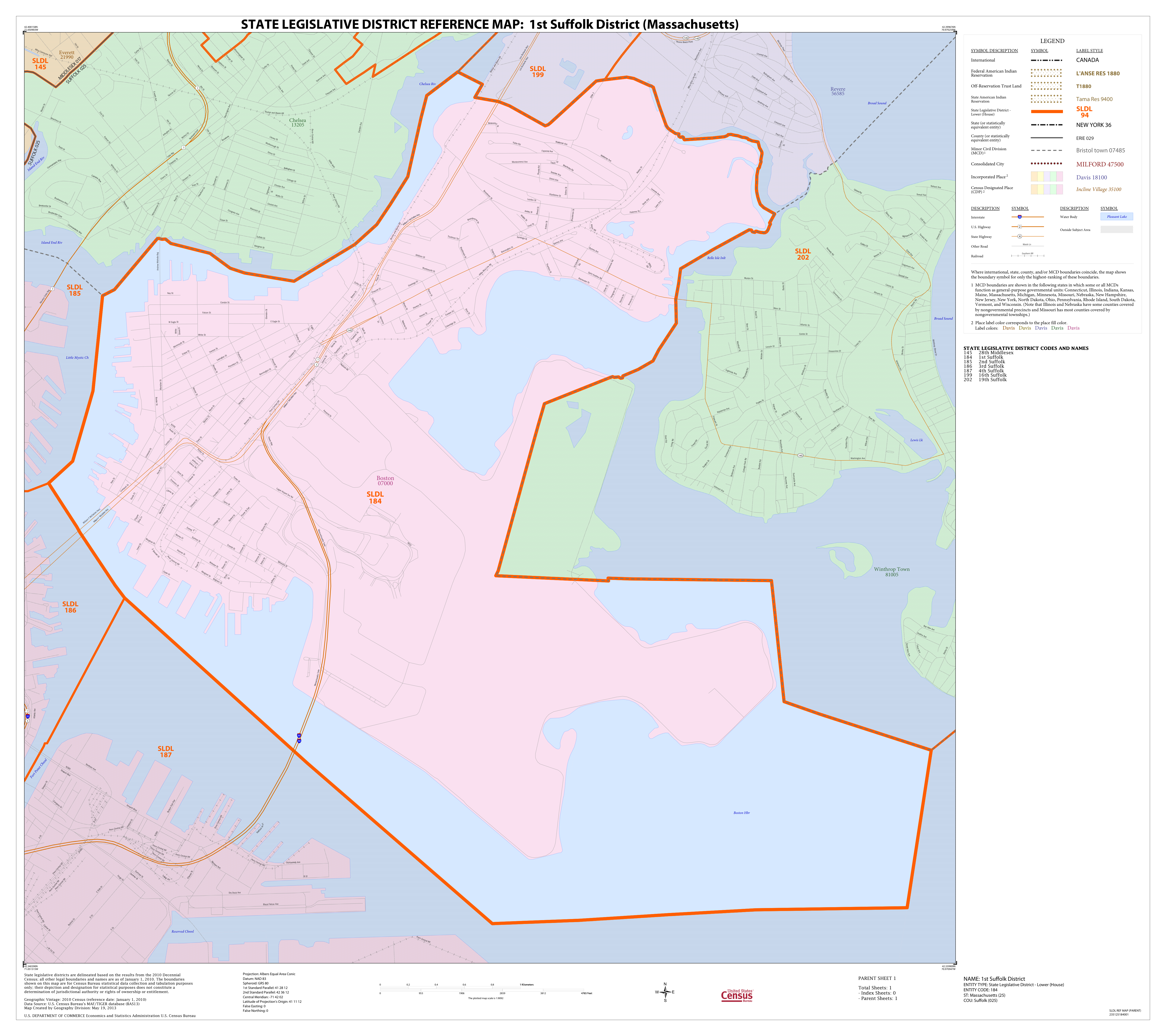
Map of Massachusetts House of Representatives' 1st Suffolk district, based on the 2010 United States census.

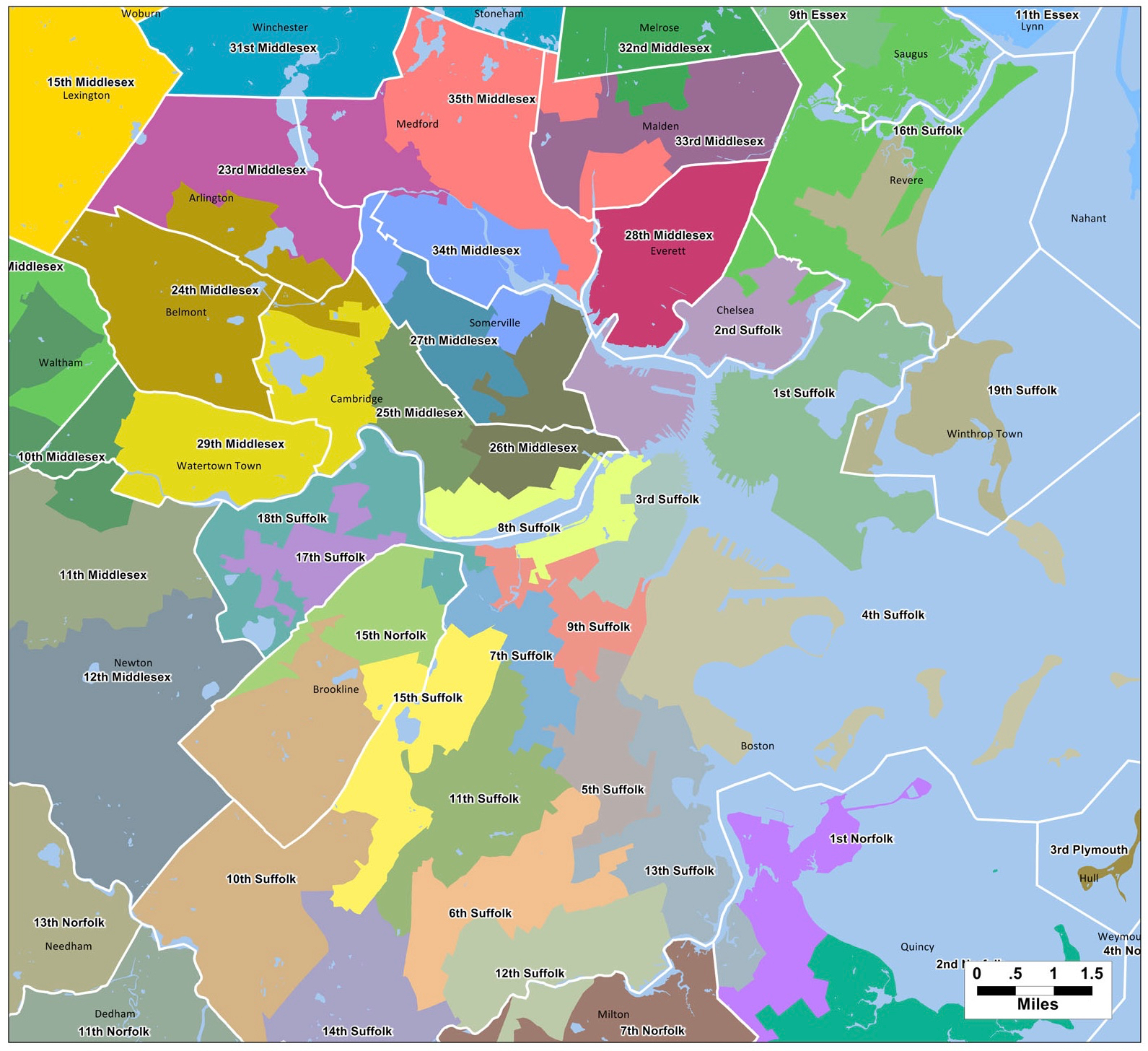
Map of Massachusetts House of Representatives districts for Suffolk County, apportioned in 2011

Massachusetts House of Representatives' 1st Suffolk district in the United States is one of 160 legislative districts included in the lower house of the Massachusetts General Court. It covers part of the city of Boston in Suffolk County. Democrat Adrian Madaro of East Boston has represented the district since 2015.

The current district geographic boundary overlaps with that of the Massachusetts Senate's 1st Suffolk and Middlesex district.

== Representatives ==
- Wm. Deblois, circa 1858
- Martin Griffin, circa 1859
- George W. Parmenter, circa 1858-1859
- Clarence P. Lovell, circa 1888
- Charles T. Witt, circa 1888
- Joseph Murley, circa 1908
- Lewis McKie, circa 1908
- Edward Cox, circa 1918
- Edward Kelley, circa 1918
- Ceorce F. Murphy, circa 1920
- Thomas A. Niland, circa 1920
- Robert Dinsmore, circa 1923
- Thomas Winston, circa 1923
- Francis Irwin, circa 1935
- Thomas E. Barry, circa 1935
- Tony Centracchio, circa 1935
- Enrico Cappucci, circa 1945
- Francis Matera, circa 1945
- Manassah E. Bradley, circa 1951
- Mario Umana, circa 1951
- Michael Porrazzo, circa 1953
- George DiLorenzo, circa 1967
- Michael D'Avolio, circa 1967
- Emanuel Gus Serra, circa 1975
- Tom Gallagher, 1980 – 1986
- Anthony Petruccelli, June 1999 – July 2007
- Carlo Basile, November 1, 2007 – January 7, 2015
- Adrian C. Madaro, April 8, 2015-current

== See also ==
- List of Massachusetts House of Representatives elections
- Other Suffolk County districts of the Massachusetts House of Representatives: 2nd, 3rd, 4th, 5th, 6th, 7th, 8th, 9th, 10th, 11th, 12th, 13th, 14th, 15th, 16th, 17th, 18th, 19th
- List of Massachusetts General Courts
- List of former districts of the Massachusetts House of Representatives

== Images ==
Portraits of legislators

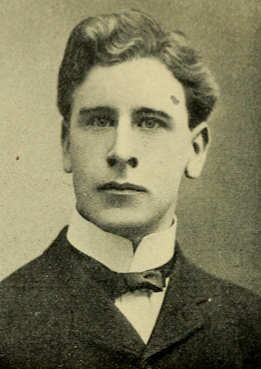
Joseph Murley

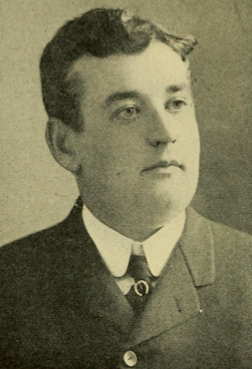
Lewis McKie

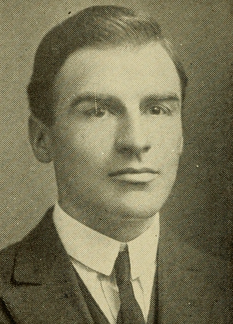
Edward Cox

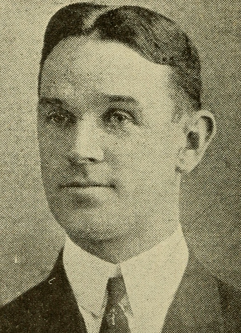
Edward Kelley

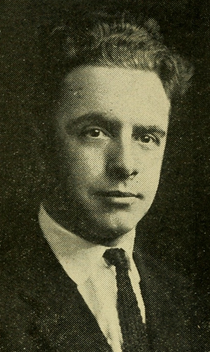
Robert Dinsmore

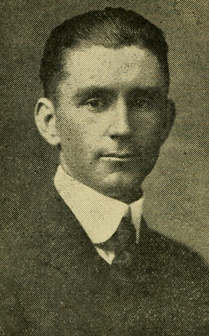
Thomas Winston

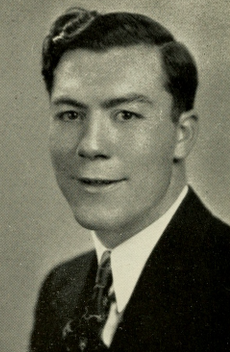
Francis Irwin

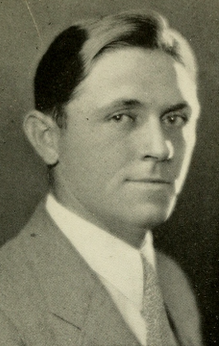
Thomas Barry

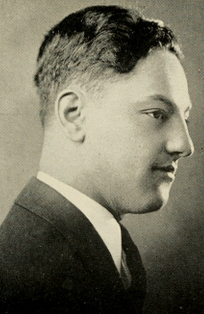
Tony Centracchio

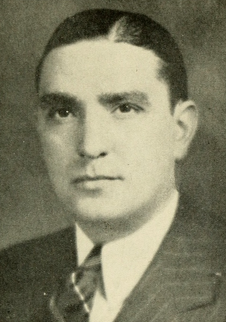
Enrico Cappucci

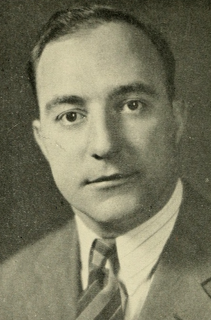
Francis Matera

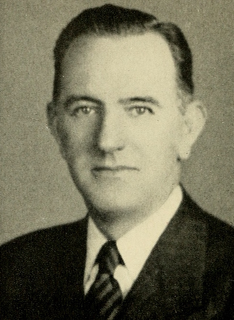
Manassah Bradley

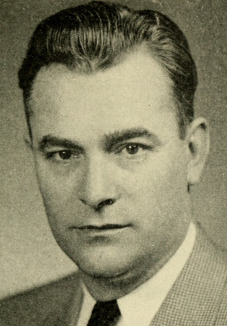
Michael Porrazzo

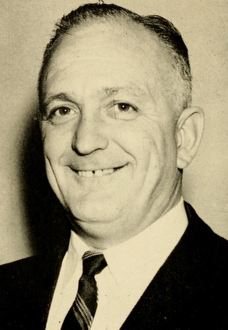
George DiLorenzo

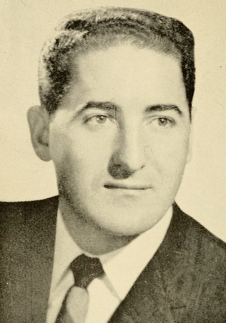
Michael D'Avolio

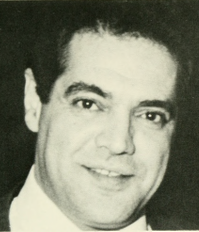
Emanuel Serra

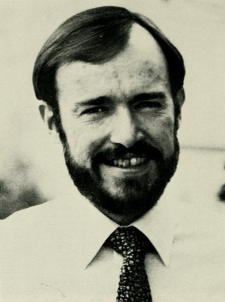
Thomas Gallagher

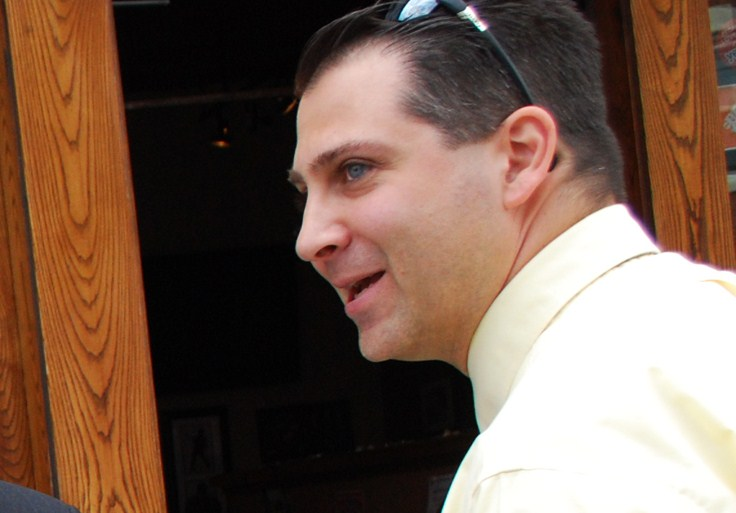
Anthony Petrucelli
