= Florence Cook (Massachusetts politician) =

American politician

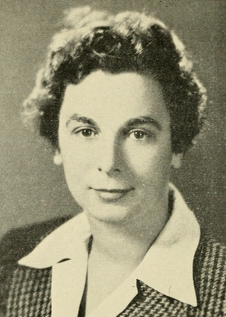

Member of the Massachusetts House of Representatives from the 12th Suffolk district
- In office 1943–1946

Florence Cook was an American Democratic politician from Roxbury, Massachusetts. She represented the 12th Suffolk district in the Massachusetts House of Representatives from 1943 to 1946.
