= Linda Dorcena Forry =

American politician (born 1973)

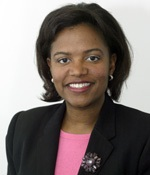

Member of the Massachusetts Senate from the 1st Suffolk district
- In office June 14, 2013 - January 25, 2018
- Preceded by: Jack Hart
- Succeeded by: Nick Collins

Member of the Massachusetts House of Representatives from the 12th Suffolk district
- In office 2005 - June 14, 2013
- Preceded by: Tom Finneran
- Succeeded by: Dan Cullinane

Personal details
- Born: 1973 (age 52–53) Boston, Massachusetts, U.S.
- Party: Democratic
- Spouse: Bill Forry
- Education: Boston College
- Profession: Business management

Linda Dorcena Forry (born 1973) is a former Democratic member of the Massachusetts Senate, who represented the 1st Suffolk district from June 2013 - January 2018. She previously represented the 12th Suffolk District in the Massachusetts House of Representatives after winning a special election in April 2005. Haitian-American, Dorcena Forry, is the former House Chair of the Joint Committee on Community Development and Small Business.

== Early life and education ==
Dorcena Forry was born in Boston and raised in the Dorchester neighborhood of Boston. She attended St. Kevin Grammar School and Monsignor Ryan Memorial High School in Dorchester and then Boston College. In 1997, she graduated from Boston College's Carroll School of Management in 1997. In 2014, she received a master's degree in public administration from Harvard Kennedy School at Harvard University. She was a Rappaport Fellow at Harvard.

== Career ==
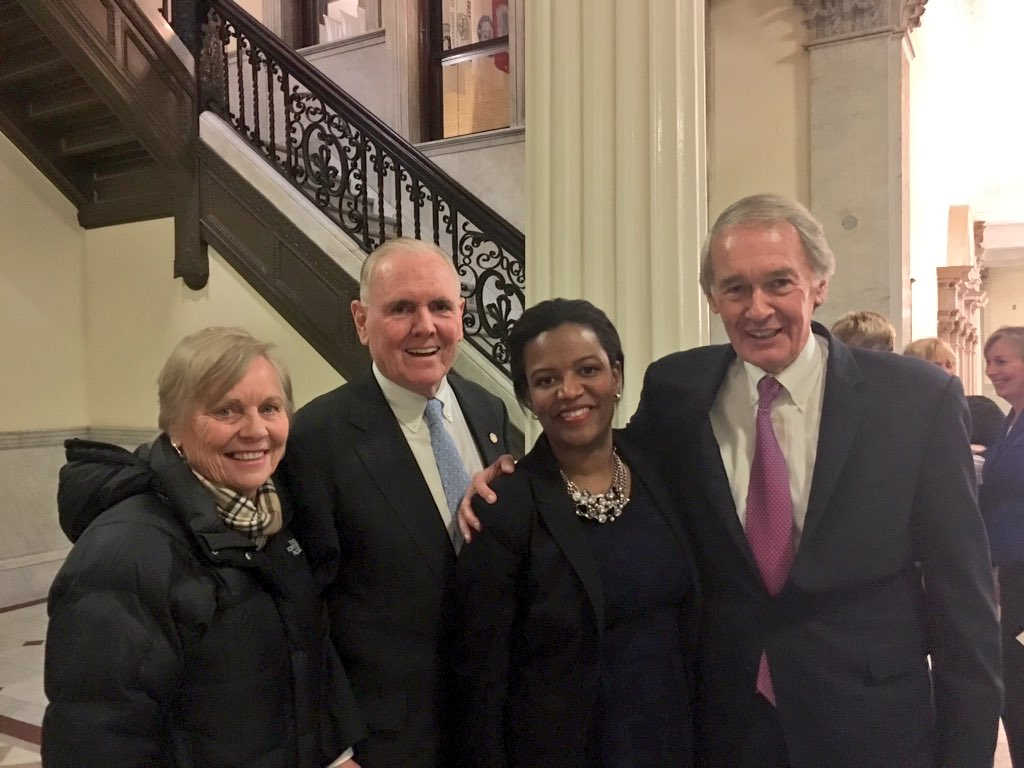
Left to right: Kathy Flynn, Raymond Flynn, Forry, and Ed Markey at the 2016 State of the Union Address

After graduating from Boston College, Dorcena Forry was a legislative assistant, working for then-State Representative Charlotte Golar Richie (Fifth Suffolk District serving Roxbury and Dorchester). When she left the State House in 1999 to work for the executive staff at the City of Boston's Department of Neighborhood Development, she had risen to the position of Acting Chief of Staff.

From 2005 to 2013, Dorcena Forry represented the Commonwealth's 12th Suffolk House district, a cross-section that includes parts of the town of Milton and the city of Boston, including Dorchester, Hyde Park and Mattapan. In 2009, Forry served as Chair of the Black and Latino Caucus. That same year, she was appointed Chairman of the Joint Committee on Community Development and Small Businesses.

Dorcena Forry won the Democratic nomination in the April 2013 special primary election to succeed state Senator Jack Hart in the First Suffolk Senate district, defeating Rep. Nick Collins. She defeated Republican Joseph A. Ureneck in the final election on May 28 and was sworn in on June 14, 2013. She stepped down on January 25, 2018, to become a vice president at Suffolk Construction.

Dorcena Forry serves as a trustee of Eversource Energy, New England's largest energy delivery company.

She is also the founder and principal of LDF Holdings, LLC, a consulting firm based in Boston which specializes in development and corporate relations.

In 2023, she assumed new duties as co-publisher of the Dorchester Reporter, which she co-owns with her husband Bill Forry.

Sen. Dorcena Forry serves on multiple boards, including the Edward M. Kennedy Institute for the United States Senate, the John F. Kennedy Library Foundation's board of advisors, the Winsor School, Boston College High School board of trustees, the Boys and Girls Clubs of Dorchester, and Make a Wish Massachusetts and Rhode Island.

Senator Dorcena Forry is also one of the original founders of the New Commonwealth Fund, founded in 2020 by a coalition of leaders dedicated to transforming philanthropy by advancing funding models that prioritize innovation, effectiveness, and inclusion. Since 2020, NCF has committed over $16.3 million to organizations implementing solutions that strengthen communities and expand access to resources. Sen. Forry serves on the organization's board of directors.

Senator Dorcena Forry is one of the founding members of the National Haitian American Elected Officials Network (NHAEON), which she formed in 2009 with several other prominent men and women of Haitian descent serving in elected office in the United States. Sen. Dorcena Forry is an active member of the organization and remains an outspoken advocate for Haitian people and for all immigrants to the US.

Senator Dorcena Forry served as a trustee of the Boston Public Library from 2016-2021.

Senator Forry's legislative career and personal connection to Ireland through her family's roots has made her a sought after voice on US-Ireland relations in recent years.

During her tenure as State Senator, Sen. Dorcena Forry hosted the annual South Boston St. Patrick's Day Breakfast, a regionally televised event that has been a Boston political tradition since the mid-20th century. Sen. Forry's historic role as the first Black person and first woman to host the roast/breakfast was a major news event in Massachusetts and Ireland in 2014. The Irish Times proclaimed Sen. Forry to be "the new star of Irish America."

In 2025, she was a featured speaker at the Kennedy Summer School conference in Ireland, held annually to explore development in business and diplomacy between Ireland and the US.

== Personal ==
Dorcena Forry is married to Bill Forry, editor and publisher of the Dorchester Reporter. The couple live in Lower Mills, Dorchester and have four children: John, Conor, Madeline and Norah. Three of her children were born during her tenure in the House of Representatives.

Senator Dorcena Forry's parents are Annie and Andre Dorcena, who immigrated to the United States from Haiti in the late 1960s. Together, they worked multiple jobs, bought a two-family home in Dorchester in the 1970s, and raised their family in St. Paul parish (later Holy Family), a Catholic parish in Dorchester, MA.

Her brother, Will Dorcena, ran unsuccessfully for an at-large seat on the Boston City Council in 2011. He also was a candidate in the 2013 Boston mayoral election, but was denied ballot access due to submitting an insufficient number of valid petition signatures.

== Awards ==
•Greater Boston Chamber of Commerce Outstanding Young Leader Award, 2013

• 2017 Legislator of the Year Award from Massachusetts Office for Victims Assistance

- 2011 MPAH Haiti Movie Awards Humanitarian Award Recipient
- UMass Chancellor's Award 2018 UMass Boston Chancellor's Award for Service
- Greater Boston PFLAG Cornerstone of Equality Award, 2020
- Mass Mentoring Partnership Champion Award, 2017
- Solas Award from RIAN, 2020
- Silver Key Award, Charitable Irish Society of Boston, 2018
