= Brian A. Joyce =

American politician

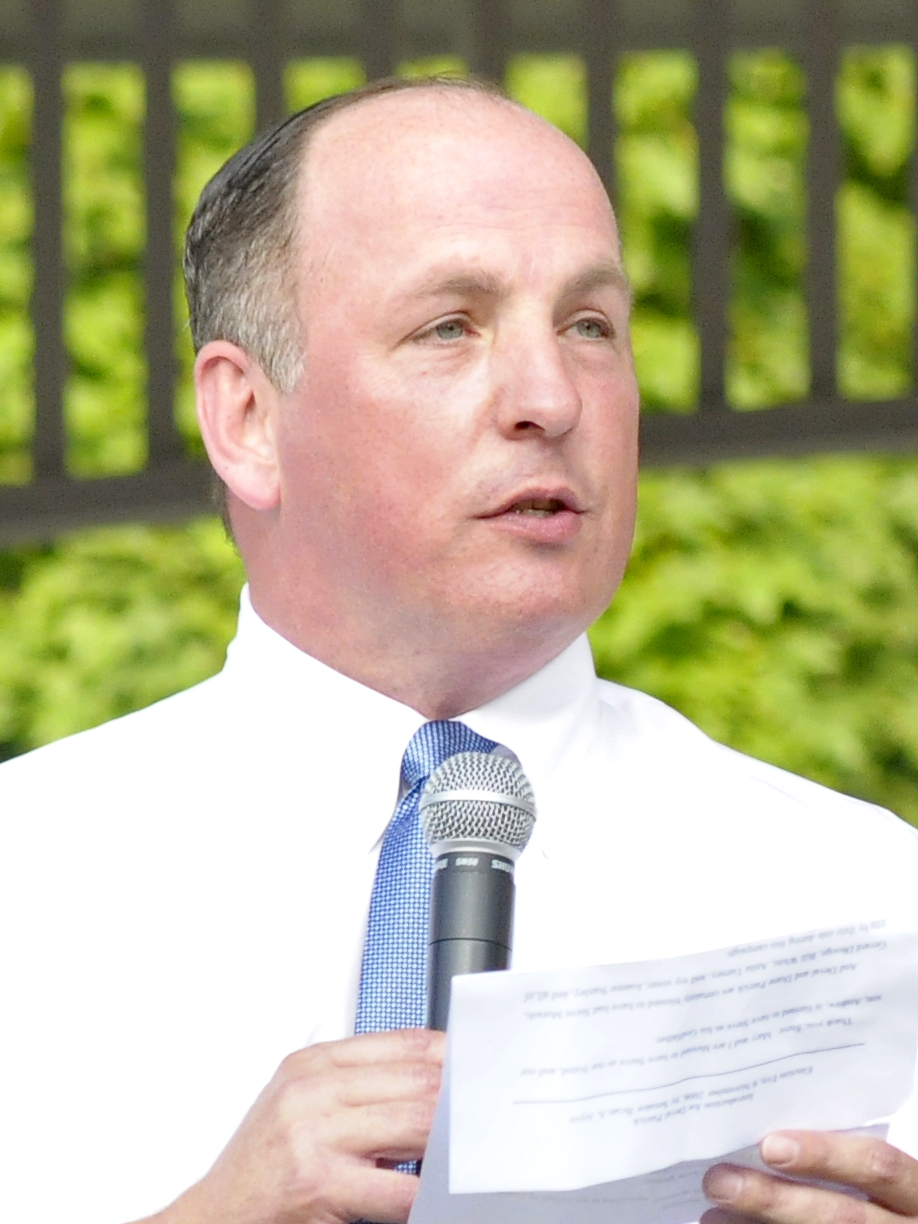
- Joyce in 2008

Member of the Massachusetts Senate from the Norfolk, Bristol and Plymouth district
- In office January 1998 – January 2017
- Succeeded by: Walter Timilty

Personal details
- Born: September 5, 1962 Winchester, Massachusetts, U.S.
- Died: September 27, 2018 (aged 56) Westport, Massachusetts, U.S.
- Party: Democratic
- Education: Boston College; Suffolk University
- Occupation: Politician, Lawyer

Brian Augustine Joyce (September 5, 1962 – September 27, 2018) was an American politician who was a Massachusetts State Senator for the Democratic Party. He served for nine terms, representing the Norfolk, Bristol and Plymouth district, which includes Avon, Braintree Precincts 1A, 1B, 2A & 2B, Canton, East Bridgewater Precinct 4, Easton Precincts 3–6, Milton, Randolph, Sharon Precincts 2 & 3, Stoughton, and West Bridgewater.

== Background and education ==
Joyce was born in Winchester, Massachusetts. He graduated from Milton High School in 1980. He received his bachelor's degree from Boston College School of Management in 1984, and he graduated magna cum laude from Suffolk University Law School in 1990. He practiced law in Milton, Massachusetts.

== Senate career ==
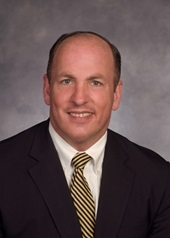
An official portrait of Joyce

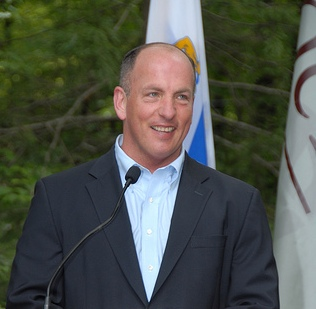
Joyce in 2014

During his tenure in the Senate, Joyce distinguished himself as a fierce advocate for the rights of disabled children and elderly citizens. He was credited with securing hundreds of millions of dollars for public schools in his district, and he was instrumental in the revitalization of the Neponset River and Blue Hills reservations.

In 2004, after Massachusetts became the first U.S. state to legalize same-sex marriage, Joyce preserved equal marriage rights by filibustering a bill that would have banned same-sex marriage. At the time, Joyce explained his decision by stating that "I believe in an America where no religious body seeks to impose its will, directly or indirectly. Tradition as a rationale for discrimination is not persuasive."

In May 2006, Joyce traveled to Pakistan in support of Bush Administration's efforts to court the allied nation in the war on terror, where he talked foreign policy on state-run PTV, joining then Republican Representative Mark Martin of Arkansas and New Mexico Attorney General Hector H. Balderas on a top Pakistani talk show.

Joyce strongly opposed the Judge Rotenberg Center during his tenure in office, and he tried repeatedly to ban the center's use of electric shock treatment on disabled children. The Judge Rotenberg Center has been condemned for torture by the United Nations special rapporteur on torture.

During his political career, Joyce was given the nickname "Multiple Choice Joyce" for his propensity of taking whatever side of an issue was considered politically expedient.

=== Committee memberships ===
During his final term in office, Joyce served in the following roles:

- Assistant Majority Leader
- Chair, Senate Committee on Bills in the Third Reading
- Chair, Special Senate Committee to Improve Government
- Vice Chair, Senate Committee on Redistricting
- Joint Committee on Health Care Financing

== Ethics probes and criminal investigations ==
On February 17, 2016, the FBI and IRS conducted a raid at Joyce's Washington Street law office. Joyce was under scrutiny for various ethical improprieties alleged by Boston Globe reporters, including having his campaign fund pay for his son's high school graduation party and accepting free or discounted services from a dry cleaner in Randolph, Massachusetts. According to the FBI, the raid was part of a federal investigation, though no charges have been filed at that time.

The nature of the raid has again raised recurring questions about the close relationship between the Boston Globe and the office of Boston's U.S. Attorney, Carmen Ortiz. The Boston's U.S. Attorney's Office has since come under increased scrutiny for abuses of power for political purposes. Many of the Globe's allegations were proven inaccurate by other journalists, who expressed concern that the Globe may have knowingly printed misleading stories about Joyce.

On February 23, 2016, Joyce announced that he would not seek re-election to the Massachusetts State Senate for the next term.

During the winter of 2016, The Boston Globe reported that the federal government has seated a grand jury to look into Joyce's conduct.

== Federal indictment ==
In December 2017, Joyce was indicted by a federal grand jury on charges he collected over $1 million in bribes and kickbacks that he laundered through his law office and another personal business. He was arrested by Federal agents on December 8, 2017, for the multiple felony counts of the indictment.

Legal experts have expressed doubt over the merit of the charges against Joyce, and many of the governments' allegations were later disproven. Prosecutors' attempt to disqualify Joyce's attorney was met with alarm by members of the Boston legal community, who viewed it as an unprecedented infringement on a defendant's Sixth Amendment rights. The ACLU, along with the Massachusetts Bar Association and dozens of individual Massachusetts attorneys, jointly filed an amici curiae brief defending Joyce's Constitutional right to counsel and rebuking the Government for its overreach. The conduct of federal prosecutors in the case has exacerbated ongoing concerns over the legal ethics of the Boston U.S. Attorney's Office.

Joyce pleaded not guilty in December 2017 to charges including racketeering, money laundering, mail fraud, conspiracy and scheming to defraud the Internal Revenue Service (IRS). Joyce was released on a $250,000 bond.

The 102-page indictment accuses Joyce of turning his law office into a criminal enterprise, going so far as to accept hundreds of pounds of free coffee from a local Dunkin' Donuts owner.

In January 2018, Joyce's former accountant, John Nardozzi, was indicted on federal charges that he helped prepare and file false tax returns for Joyce, misclassifying over $2 million of personal expenses as business expenses, in order to reduce Joyce's tax burden. In October 2019, Nardozzi was convicted by a jury of helping Joyce cheat the IRS out of approximately $600,000 in tax payments, and in January 2020, Nardozzi was sentenced to 18 months in federal prison.

On October 8, 2018, US Attorney Andrew Lelling announced that he had dismissed all criminal charges against Joyce, in light of his untimely death.

== Death ==
In the early morning hours of September 26, 2018, Joyce was involved in a single car crash when he reportedly swerved to avoid hitting a deer, crashing through a telephone pole, and finally stopping after hitting a fence.

On September 27, 2018, Joyce was found dead in his home in Westport, with no foul play suspected.

On December 4, 2018, Massachusetts state medical examiner's office reported Joyce's death was caused by an overdose of pentobarbital and ruled the manner of death was "acute pentobarbital intoxication" and remains undetermined, pending a “thorough death investigation.”

== Personal life ==
Joyce was a lifelong resident of Milton, Massachusetts, where he lived with his wife, Mary. They had five children.
