= Massachusetts House of Representatives' 4th Suffolk district =

American legislative district

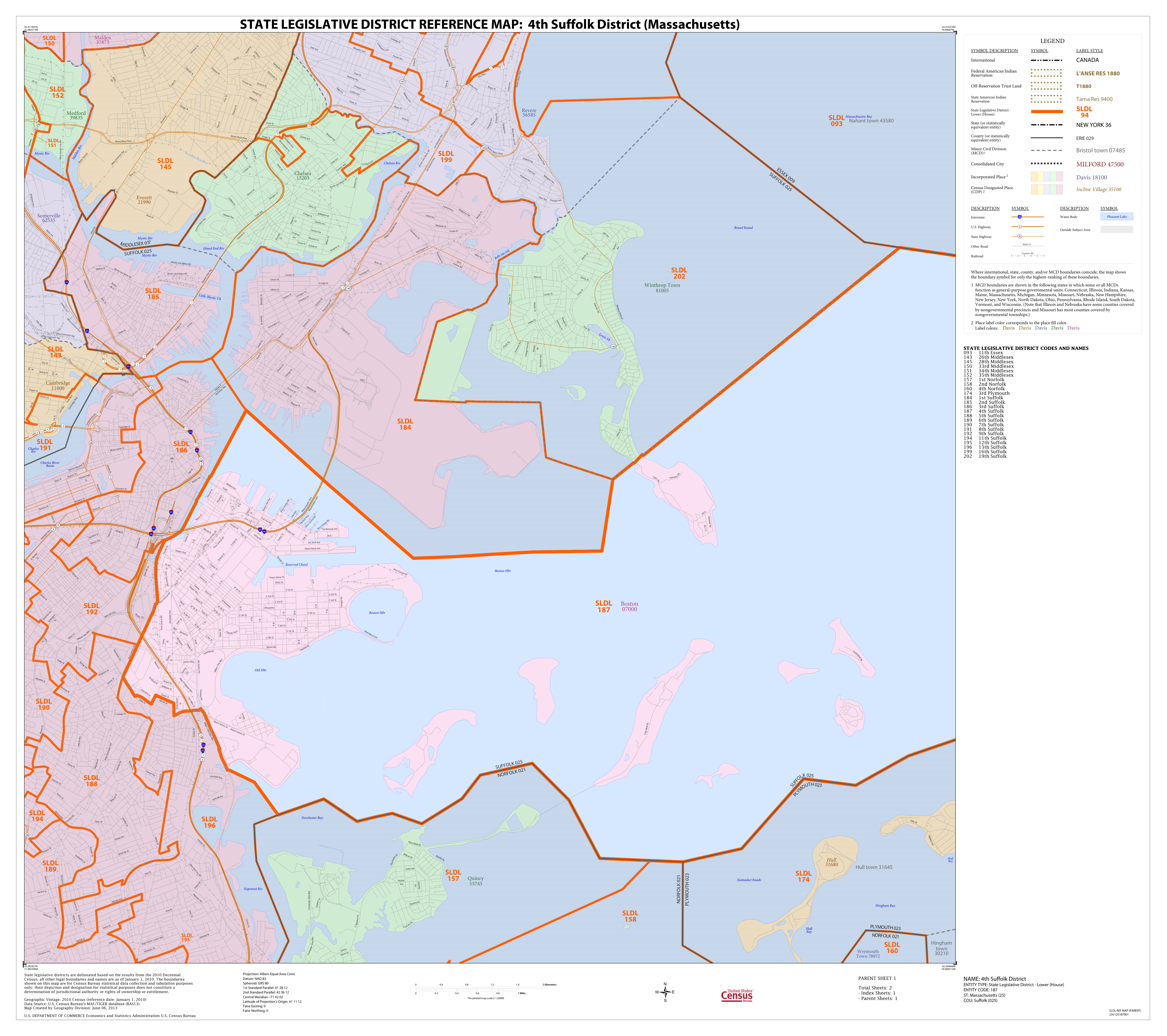
Map of Massachusetts House of Representatives' 4th Suffolk district, based on the 2010 United States census.

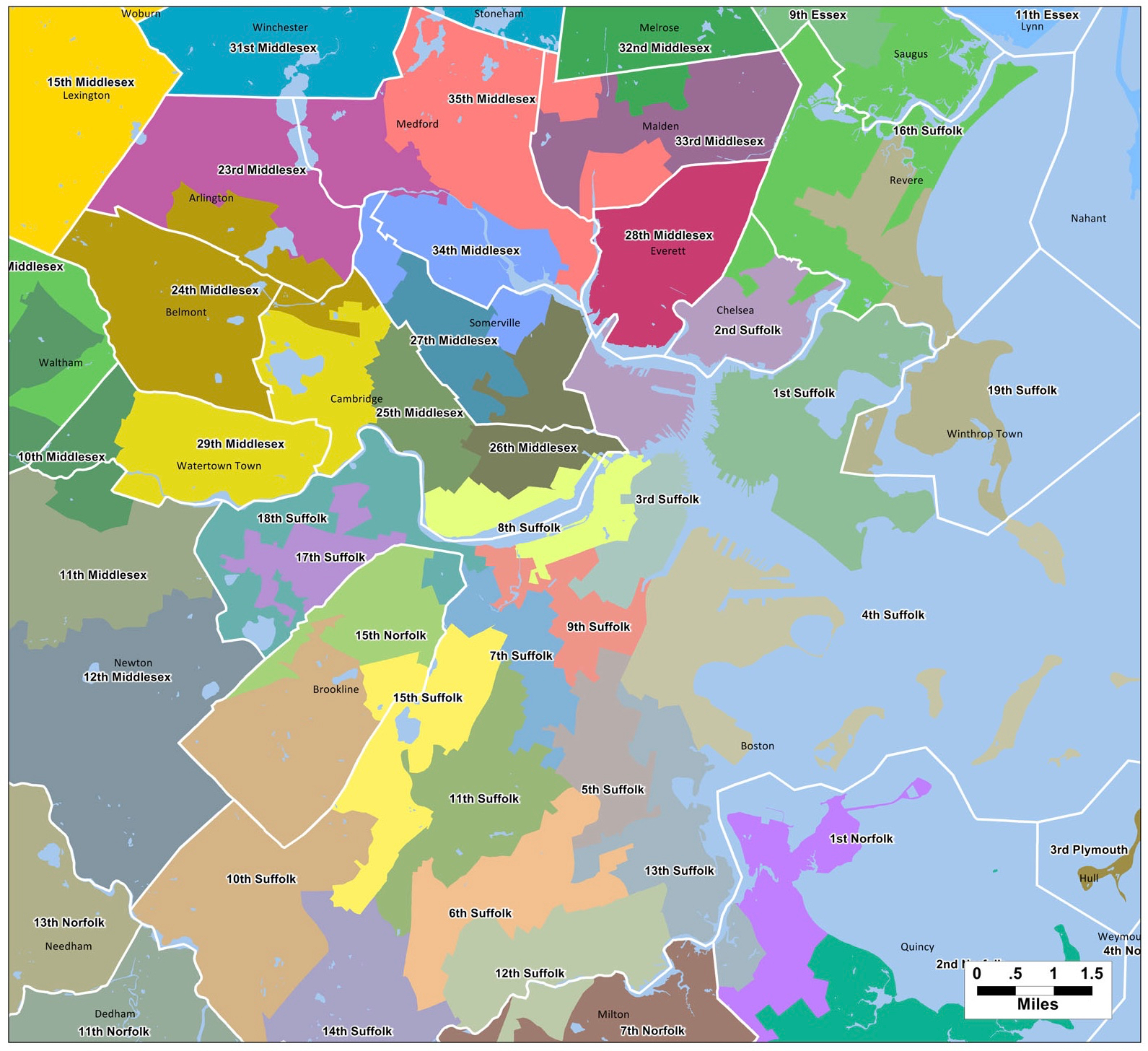
Map of Massachusetts House of Representatives districts for Suffolk County, apportioned in 2011

Massachusetts House of Representatives' 4th Suffolk district in the United States is one of 160 legislative districts included in the lower house of the Massachusetts General Court. It covers part of the city of Boston in Suffolk County. Democrat David Biele of South Boston has represented the district since 2019.

The current district geographic boundary overlaps with that of the Massachusetts Senate's 1st Suffolk district.

== Representatives ==
- Charles Hale, circa 1858-1859
- William B. Spooner, circa 1858
- John H. Wilkins, circa 1859
- Joseph H. Gleason, circa 1888
- William H. Prebble, circa 1888
- William J. Francis, circa 1920
- James J. Mellen, circa 1920
- Vincent Francis Cronin, circa 1951
- Thomas H. Spurr Jr., circa 1951
- Melvin H. King, circa 1975
- Brian Wallace
- Nick Collins
- David Biele, 2019-current

== See also ==
- List of Massachusetts House of Representatives elections
- Other Suffolk County districts of the Massachusetts House of Representatives: 1st, 2nd, 3rd, 5th, 6th, 7th, 8th, 9th, 10th, 11th, 12th, 13th, 14th, 15th, 16th, 17th, 18th, 19th
- List of Massachusetts General Courts
- List of former districts of the Massachusetts House of Representatives

== Images ==
Portraits of legislators

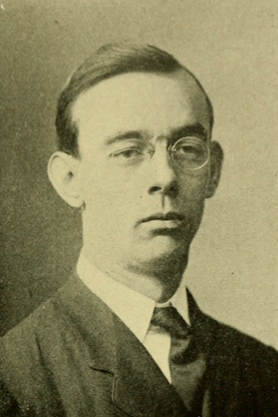
J. Frank O'Brien

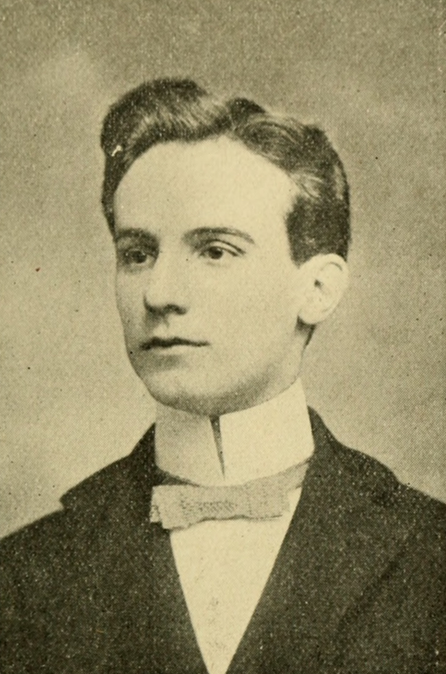
John Hayes

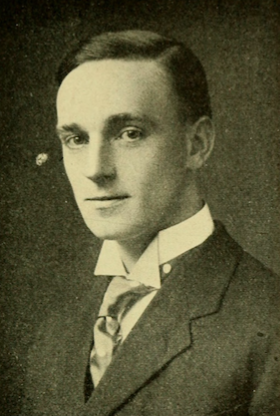
William F. Murray

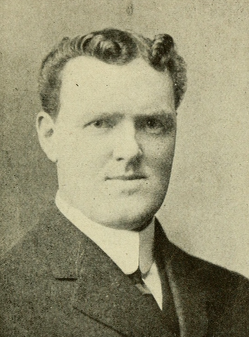
Henry McLaughlin

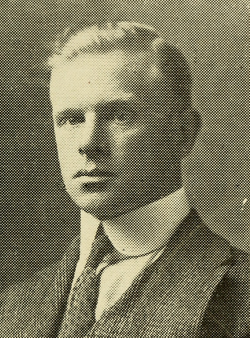
John Mahoney

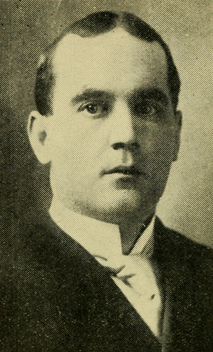
James Mellen

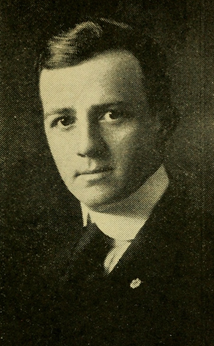
John McCarthy

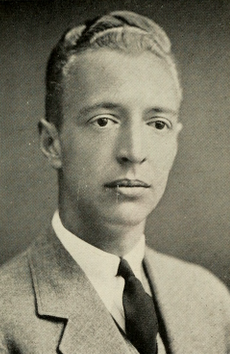
Charles Innes

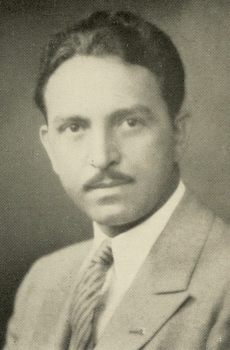
George Demeter

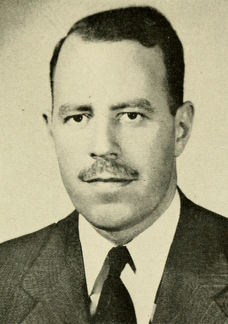
John Brown

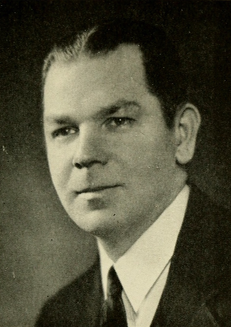
Perlie Chase

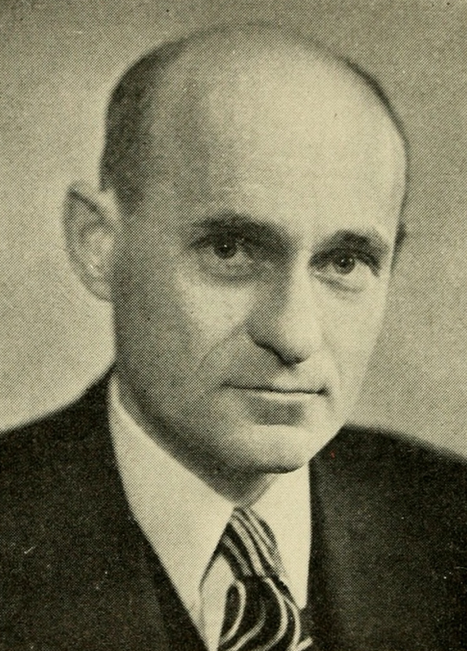
Gordon Dickson Boynton

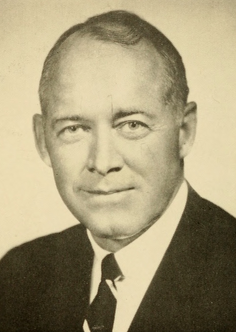
David O'Connor

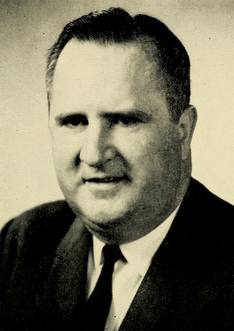
Joseph Loughman

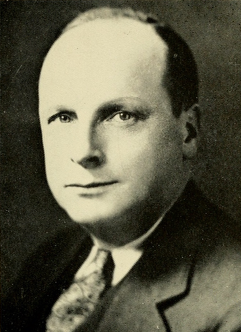
William Carey

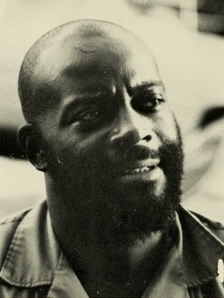
Melvin King

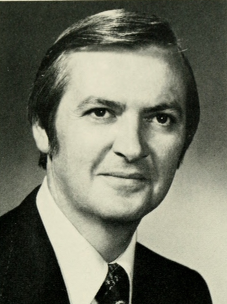
Michael F. Flaherty Sr.

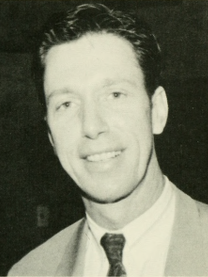
Stephen F. Lynch

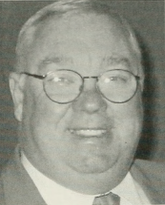
Brian Wallace

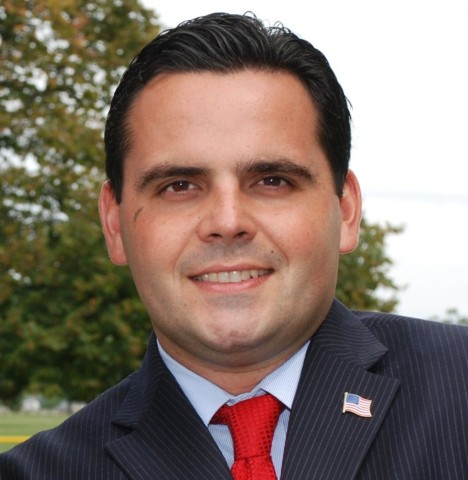
Nick Collins
