= 2025 Boston mayoral election =

Election in Massachusetts, United States

- November 4, 2025
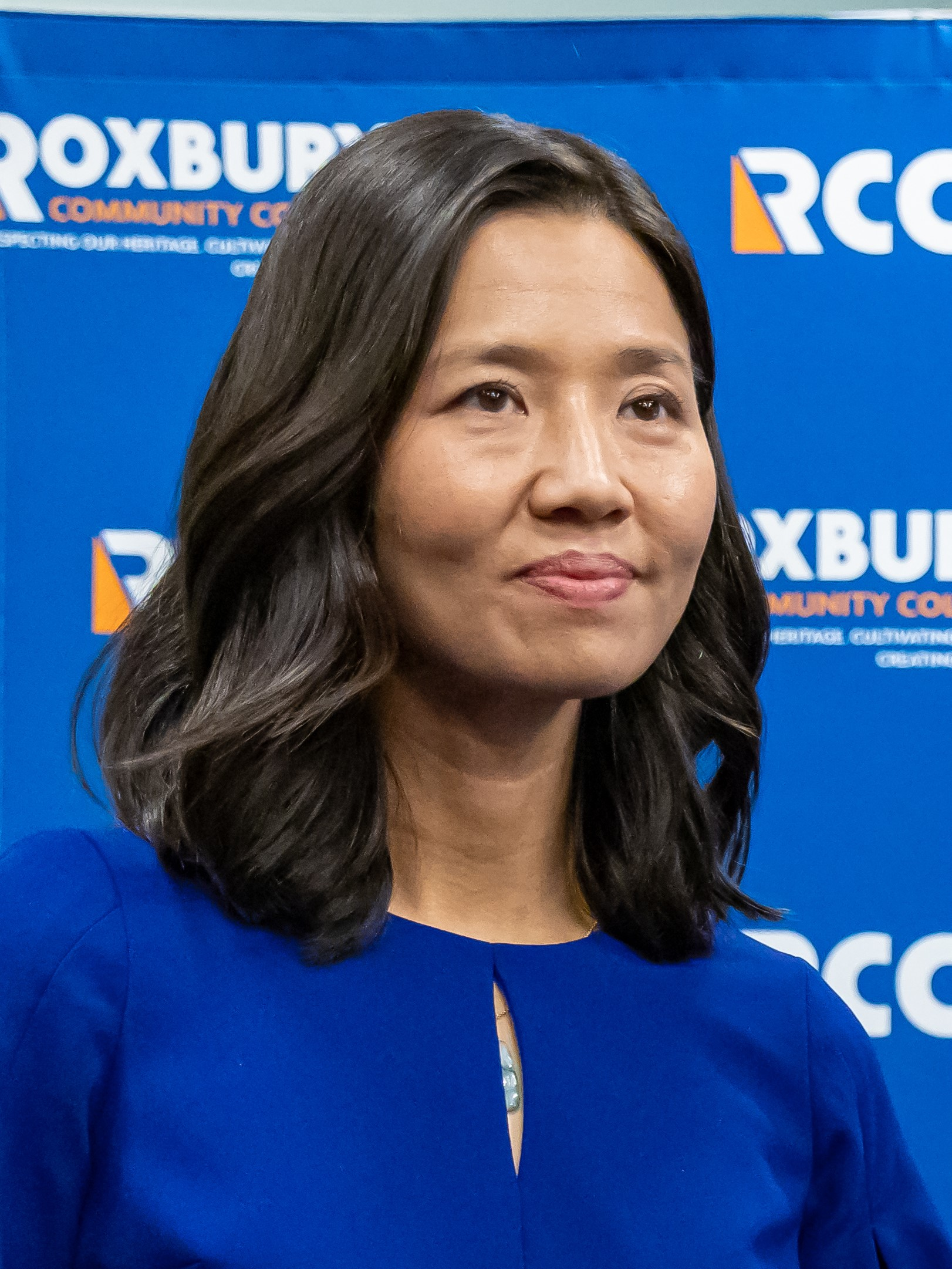

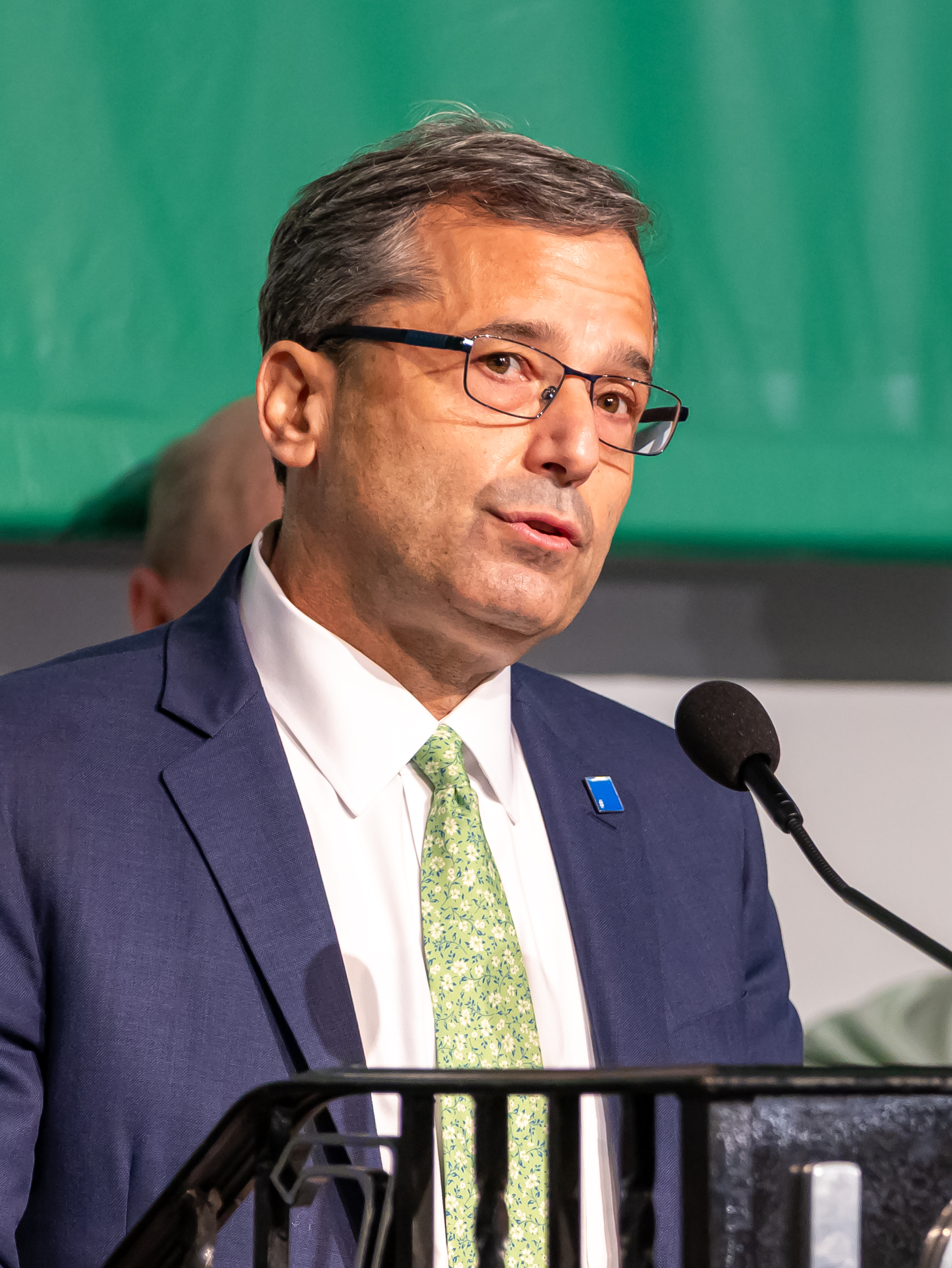
Candidate	Michelle Wu	Josh Kraft (withdrawn) (Note: Wu was unopposed on the general election ballot. She had faced Kraft and two other challengers in the preliminary election. She and Kraft advanced to the general election after, respectively, receiving 71.85% and 23.08% in the preliminary. Kraft, however, withdrew from the general election ballot. There were 5,725 write-in votes cast in the general election (6.76% of the vote), of which Kraft was counted as receiving the most)
Popular vote	78,997	1,128
Percentage	93.23%	1.33%
Mayor before election
Michelle Wu
Elected mayor
Michelle Wu

The 2025 Boston mayoral election was held on November 4, 2025, to elect the mayor of Boston. Because more than two candidates qualified for the ballot, a non-partisan primary election, known in Boston as a preliminary election, was held on September 9, 2025. The election was held concurrently with the 2025 Boston City Council election. Incumbent mayor Michelle Wu successfully ran for re-election to a second term.

Wu and nonprofit executive Josh Kraft advanced to the general election after being the top-two finishers in a preliminary election (nonpartisan primary) held on September 9, with Wu receiving approximately 72% of the vote and Kraft receiving approximately 23%. However, on September 11 (two days after the preliminary election) Kraft announced he was ending his campaign and formally withdrew his name from the ballot on September 12. Kraft's requested withdrawal from the ballot was officially confirmed by the Secretary of the Commonwealth's office on September 15. The withdrawal of a candidate from the general election ballot had been unprecedented in Boston since the city began using its current format for mayoral elections in 1951. Kraft's withdrawal left Wu as the only candidate on the general election ballot, making her the city's first mayor to be unopposed for re-election in a general election since Thomas Menino in 1997. Wu's general election vote share of more than 93% is the greatest received by any Boston mayoral candidate since 1874. The 78,997 votes Wu received in the general election are the second-most received by a Boston mayoral candidate since 1983. The vote share (percentage) Wu received in the nonpartisan preliminary was the highest received by any candidate since Boston began holding nonpartisan primaries, and the total number of votes she received in the preliminary was the third-most (surpassed only by John Hynes and James Michael Curley, both in 1951).

== Candidates ==
=== Advanced to general election ===
Two candidates advanced to the general election after winning the two highest vote totals in the non-partisan preliminary election.

- Michelle Wu, incumbent mayor since 2021 (Democratic)

==== Withdrew after qualifying for general election ====
- Josh Kraft, former chief executive of the Boys & Girls Club of Boston and son of New England Patriots owner Robert Kraft (Democratic)

=== Eliminated in preliminary election ===
Four candidates qualified for the primary ballot, with two advancing to the general election. The following candidates qualified for inclusion on the preliminary election ballot and did not advance to the general election.

- Robert Cappucci, former member of the Boston School Committee (1987–1991); (Note: This was an elected position until 1991, when the seats became mayorally-appointed.) retired Boston Police officer perennial candidate (Note: Capucci had previously run for public office 13 times (including two successful campaigns for Boston School Committee); candidate for mayor in 2013, 2017, and 2021; candidate for Boston City Council in 1983, 1991, 1993; candidate for the United States House of Representatives in Massachusetts's 8th congressional district in 1982, 1984, and 1986; candidate for Massachusetts Senate in the 1st Suffolk District in 1978 and 1980) (Democratic)
- Domingos DaRosa, community activist and perennial candidate (Note: DaRosa had previously run in the 2017, 2019, and 2021 Boston City Council elections) (Independent)

=== Did not qualify for ballot ===
- Alex Alex, restaurant worker (Independent)
- Kerry Augustin, (Note: Augustin withdrew a week before the petition deadline and did not file a nominating petition.) member of the Boston City Strong Commission (Democratic)
- Berry Homer Adams, HVAC technician (Independent)
- John Houton, attorney and former assistant corporation counsel of the Boston Treasury department (2011–2025) (Democratic)
- Jorge Mendoza-Iturralde, restaurateur (Independent)
- Alex Winston, cryotherapy business owner (Independent)

=== Declined ===
- Ed Flynn, city councilor from the 2nd district, former president of the Boston City Council, and son of former mayor Raymond Flynn (Democratic) (ran for re-election)
- Thomas O'Brien, former Boston chief of planning and brother of Boston College Eagles head coach Bill O'Brien (Democratic)

== Primary election ==
=== Endorsements ===
Josh Kraft

Federal branch officials

- Rachael Rollins, former U.S. attorney for the District of Massachusetts (2022–2023)

State legislators

- Dianne Wilkerson, former state senator from the 2nd Suffolk district (1993–2008)

Local officials

- Annissa Essaibi George, former Boston city councilor (2016–2022) and runner-up for mayor in 2021
- William Gross, former commissioner of the Boston Police Department (2018–2021)

Individuals

- Robert Kraft, CEO of the Kraft Group (candidate's father)
- Meek Mill, rapper

Labor unions

- International Association of Bridge, Structural, Ornamental and Reinforcing Iron Workers Local 7
- International Longshoremen's Association and New England Dock and Marine Council
- Laborers' International Union of North America Local 22
Michelle Wu

U.S. senators

- Ed Markey, U.S. senator from Massachusetts (2013–present)
- Elizabeth Warren, U.S. senator from Massachusetts (2013–present)

U.S. representatives

- Ayanna Pressley, MA-7 (2019–present)

State senators

- Julian Cyr, Cape and Islands district (2017–present)
- Sal DiDomenico, Middlesex and Suffolk district (2010–present)
- Lydia Edwards, 1st Suffolk and Middlesex district (2022–present)
- Mike Rush, Norfolk and Suffolk district (2011–present)

State representatives

- Robert Consalvo, 14th Suffolk district (2021–present) and 2013 mayoral candidate
- Russell Holmes, 6th Suffolk district (2011–present)
- Kevin Honan, 17th Suffolk district (1987–present)
- Jay Livingstone, 8th Suffolk district (2013–present)
- Bill MacGregor, 10th Suffolk district (2023–present)
- Adrian Madaro, 1st Suffolk district (2015–present)
- Aaron Michlewitz, 3rd Suffolk district (2009–present)
- Sam Montaño, 15th Suffolk district (2023–present)
- John Moran, 9th Suffolk district (2023–present)
- Michael Moran, majority leader (2023–present) from the 18th Suffolk district (2005–present)
- Dan Ryan, 2nd Suffolk district (2014–present)
- Christopher Worrell, 5th Suffolk district (2023–present)

Boston city councilors

- Liz Breadon, 9th district (2020–present)
- Gabriela Coletta Zapata, 1st district (2022–present)
- Sharon Durkan, 8th district (2023–present)
- Ruthzee Louijeune, at-large (2022–present) president of the Boston City Council (2024–present)
- Matt O'Malley, former president of the Boston City Council (2021) from the 6th district (2010–2022)
- Enrique Pepén, 5th district (2024–present)
- Henry Santana, at-large (2024–present)
- Benjamin Weber, 6th district (2024–present)
- Brian Worrell, 4th district (2022–present)

Other municipal officials

- Kevin Hayden, Suffolk County district attorney (2022–present)

Individuals

- Jorge Arce, band member of Haciendo Punto en Otro Son
- Dallas Ducar, entrepreneur and founder of Transhealth
- Angela Menino, widow of former Mayor Thomas Menino (1993–2014)
- Andrea Olmstead, musicologist and historian
- David Ortiz, former MLB player

Boston party chapters

- Ward 3 Democratic Committee
- Ward 4 Democratic Committee
- Ward 5 Democratic Committee (Note: This ward committee is led by Bob Binney, who is a campaign treasurer for Wu's campaign.)
- Ward 15 Democratic Committee
- Ward 19 Democratic Committee

Labor unions

- AFSCME Council 93 and Massachusetts Retirees chapter
- AFT Local 66
- ATU Local 589
- BPPA and BPPA EMS Division
- Greater Boston AFL-CIO
- IBEW Local 103
- IUPAT District Council 35 and Local 1952
- LIUNA Local 223
- Massachusetts Nurses Association
- North Atlantic States Regional Council of Carpenters
- SEIU Locals 888 and 509, SEIU Massachusetts State Council, SEIU 32BJ, 1199SEIU United Healthcare Workers East, SEIU 1957 CIR, and SEIU App Drivers Union
- Teamsters Local 25
- UFCW Local 1445
- UNITE HERE Local 26
- United Auto Workers Region 9A

Organizations

- EMILY's List
- League of Conservation Voters of Massachusetts Action Fund
- Massachusetts Sierra Club
- Massachusetts Women's Political Caucus
- New American Leaders Action Fund
- Planned Parenthood Advocacy Fund of Massachusetts
- Suffolk University College Democrats
Declined to endorse

Statewide officials

- Maura Healey, governor of Massachusetts (2023–present)

Local officials

- Erin Murphy, at-large Boston city councillor (2021–present)

=== Debates and forums ===
A forum hosted by political reporter Saraya Wintersmith of GBH News was held with Michelle Wu, Josh Kraft, Domingos ReRosa, and Alex Alex on May 15th. On September 3rd, a forum with Michelle Wu and Josh Kraft was held.

2025 Boston mayoral election primary debates and forums
No.	Date & time	Host	Moderator	Link	Participants				
Key: P Participant A Absent N Non-invitee Out Out of race									
Key: P Participant A Absent N Non-invitee Out Out of race					Michelle Wu	Josh Kraft	Domingos DeRosa	Robert Cappucci	Alex Alex
1	May 15, 2025	Boston Democratic Ward Coalition	Saraya Wintersmith	YouTube	P	P	P	A	P
2	September 3, 2025	Embrace Boston; Black Economic Council of Massachusetts; NBC10 Boston	Latoyia Edwards	YouTube	P	P	N	N	Out

=== Polling ===
Poll source	Date(s) administered	Sample size (Note: Key: A – all adults RV – registered voters LV – likely voters V – unclear)	Margin of error	Kerry Augustin	Robert Cappucci	Domingos DaRosa	Jorge Mendoza- Ituralde	Josh Kraft	Michelle Wu	Other	Undecided
Emerson College	September 2–3, 2025	555 (LV)	± 4.1%	–	1%	2%	–	22%	72%	1%	2%
Suffolk University	July 13–16, 2025	500 (LV)	± 4.4%	–	–	2.8%	–	29.6%	59.8%	1.2%	6.6%
Saint Anselm College	April 23–25, 2025	564 (LV)	± 4.1%	0.5%	–	2.3%	–	21.1%	53.4%	3.2%	19.5%
Emerson College	February 24–26, 2025	617 (LV)	± 3.9%	–	–	–	2%	29%	43%	2%	24%

=== Campaign finances ===
Wu raised $1.8 million for her campaign committee. Kraft's committee raised $6.8 million, a record for a Boston mayoral preliminary campaign. However, $5.5 million of what Kraft raised came from his own personal wealth and only $1.3 came from sources and contributors other than Kraft himself (primarily wealthy donors, including Boston business leaders).

Kraft's committee spent more than $5.6 million before the primary, while Wu's campaign committee spent more than $1.1 million. The Super PAC Your City, Your Future, supporting Kraft's campaign, spent more than $3.1 million before the primary. Its chief contributors Jim Davis (chairman of the company New Balance) and Michael Rubin (founder of the sports merchandise company Fanatics), who each gave the PAC $1 million. Bold Boston, a Super PAC supporting Wu, spent more than $850,000.

=== Campaign and major issues ===
Kraft has campaigned as being more moderate than the incumbent Wu, who is regarded to be a progressive. Kraft entered the election considered a potentially strong challenger to Wu due to his lengthy philanthropic resume, his lack of political record for her to litigate, as well as his vast personal wealth and connections to wealthy prospective donors from which he could fund his campaign.

Ahead of the preliminary vote, Wu criticized the amount of his own personal wealth that Kraft used to fund his campaign, the vast amount of money Kraft spent on the preliminary, as well as Kraft's lack of full public transparency about the sources from which he derives his $6.3 million annual income. Kraft pledged in February 2025 that, if elected mayor, he would recuse himself "anything that my family's business had in front of the city of Boston".

Ahead of the preliminary, Wu received a broad amount backing from incumbent members of the Boston City Council and local Democratic Party leaders. She also benefited from holding a high popularity rating in Boston. Ahead of the preliminary vote, she had success in tying Kraft to President Donald Trump, who is highly unpopular in Boston. This tactic was regarded to have resonated, in part, due to Kraft's father having had ties (Note: Robert Kraft (father of Josh Kraft) had a longtime friendship with Trump dating back to the 1990s, and made a sizable donation to fund the Trump's first inauguration. While he was reported to have initially distanced himself from Trump in the years following the January 6, 2021 attack, reports emerged in early 2025 that the two had resumed communication, and they were once again being described by media as being allies. In February 2025, Trump named Robert Kraft's wife (Josh Kraft's step-mother) Dana Blumberg to the board of the Kennedy Center for the Performing Arts as part of a greater effort by Trump during his second term to purge members of the board and exert control over the venue.) to Trump. Wu is regarded to have benefited from having attained newfound prominence nationally as a perceived foil to the Trump administration, defending the city against attacks by the Trump administration. The week prior to the election, the Trump administration's Department of Justice filed a lawsuit against Boston over its "sanctuary city" policy. On the day of voting for the primary election, the Trump administration's Department of Homeland Security put out a statement announcing a further immigration crackdown in Massachusetts. The Trump administration also levied the threat of deploying the National Guard into the city. Tufts University political scientist Jeffrey M. Berry characterized Wu as having established herself during the Second Trump Administration" as a, "symbol of democratic resistance to the president", which he opined was to the benefit of her mayoral re-election prospects. Kraft has argued Wu's emphasis on Trump is an effort to distract from her own effort.

One of Kraft's main criticisms of Wu was the installation of bike lanes during Wu's mayoralty, with Kraft accusing her administration of having installing too many bike lanes and having done so with an insufficient amount of prior planning. Another of Kraft's top criticisms of Wu was the renovation of White Stadium which Wu has championed, with Kraft characterizing it as expensive as well as unpopular with and detrimental to communities living near the stadium. Wu has countered this by refuting Kraft's allegations of rising costs for the project, and by alleging that Kraft had a conflict of interest against the stadium due to his family's company, the Kraft Group, planning to build a privately-owned soccer stadium in the neighboring city of Everett for their New England Revolution men's team (a renovated White Stadium could compete with the Krafts' planned soccer stadium for event-bookings). Kraft also characterized Wu as having insufficiently addressed the city's housing needs in her term as mayor. Overall, Kraft's campaign was characterized as struggling to find a resonant message against Wu, and a week prior to the primary he parted ways with two of his top campaign advisors.

=== Results ===
Results by ward Wu—80–90% Wu—70–80% Wu—60–70% Wu—50–60% Wu—40–50%

Wu and Kraft's leads over Cappucci and DaRosa was pronounced enough that the Associated Press projected Wu and Kraft's first and second place finishes in the preliminary within eighteen minutes after the election's poll-closing time.

Wu led the vote in all of the city's 22 wards by comfortable margins. Of Boston's 272 precincts, Kraft only led Wu in 9. Some of the precincts where Kraft outperformed her were in Ward 16, regarded to be one of the city's more conservative areas. However, Wu still won a number of precincts in Ward 16, and carried the overall vote in the ward.

Preliminary election results
Candidate	Votes	%
Michelle Wu (incumbent)	66,859	71.85
Josh Kraft	21,481	23.08
Domingos DaRosa	2,428	2.61
Robert Cappucci	2,091	2.25
Write-in	201	0.22
Total votes	93,060	100

=== Analysis ===
Wu's 49–point lead over Kraft in the preliminary was described by GBH as a "landslide", The Boston Globe as "staggering" the Dorchester Reporter as a "blowout", and analyst Jon Keller as a "drubbing [for Kraft]". Wu is the first candidate to receive more than 70% of the vote in either round of a Boston mayoral election since the 2001 election.

Jon Keller, writing for WBUR, noted that Wu had carried the vote in Ward 16 precinct 2 by a preliminary-count of 84 to Kraft's 37. Keller described that precinct as being "one of the last remaining pockets of 'old Boston' voters in South Dorchester," and described Wu's strong performance there as, "a warning sign that moderate-to-conservative voters are by no means reflexively anti-Wu."

Numerous political analysts characterized Kraft as having failed to provide voters with a cogent rationale for his candidacy. Numerous analysts also characterized Kraft as having been a poor campaigner, despite the vast financial resources available to his campaign. The Boston Globe journalist Adrian Walker opined that Kraft had run "the most unlikable campaign for mayor in Boston history". Walker characterized Wu, contrarily, as having run a strong campaign and having benefited from positioning herself as a foil against the Trump administration, writing on the eve of the preliminary election,

Kraft — for all of his negative campaigning — has been so inept at articulating, well, anything. Wu has run a terrific campaign and props to her for that. This is truly the best version of her Boston has seen.

In a later piece published by The Boston Globe, business leader David D'Alessandro opined that the weak performance of Kraft was less due to any flaws he had as a candidate, and more due to Wu being a strong incumbent,

Kraft was a fine candidate. He has faithfully contributed to the community for decades and has a strong philanthropic record and well-known family heritage. Against most candidates, he would have had a much better showing. He unfortunately ran against an emerging phenomenon who is becoming a national political star by building a Tom Menino-like neighborhood base, standing up to the MAGA crowd, lowering the crime rate, and most importantly convincing the vast majority of voting Bostonians that she is on their side and fighting for them every day.

== General election ==
On September 11 (two days after the preliminary), Kraft announced he was ending his campaign. The following day, he filed a request with the elections office to have his name removed (Note: State law gives candidates up to six days after the preliminary election to request to have their name removed from the ballot. After this deadline, they are not permitted to make such a request.) from the general election ballot. On September 15, the Secretary of the Commonwealth's office confirmed Kraft properly filed the paperwork by the deadline to remove his name from the ballot. As a result, his name was not listed on the general election ballot. This is the first instance under Boston's current election format (Note: 1951 was the first election in which Boston used its current format of nonpartisan preliminaries preceding its mayoral general elections) that a candidate has withdrawn after advancing to the mayoral election ballot.

DaRosa (as the next-highest candidate in the preliminary) would have been eligible to replace Kraft as the general election opponent to Wu if the final tally of the preliminary saw him receive at least 3,000 votes. DaRosa announced he would seek a recount of the preliminary in the longshot hope that there had been a several hundred vote undercount of his support in the preliminary that would be sufficient for a recount to potentially increase his vote share to the 3,000 needed for him to be eligible to replace Kraft on the general election ballot, and he began circulating recount petitions. On September 22, after recounts were completed in several wards, it was confirmed that Wu would be unopposed in the general election. Wu is the first candidate unopposed on a mayoral general election ballot since Tom Menino in 1997.

=== Candidates ===
- Michelle Wu, incumbent mayor since 2021

Withdrew from ballot

- Josh Kraft, former chief executive of the Boys & Girls Club of Boston and son of New England Patriots owner Robert Kraft

=== Polling ===
Poll source	Date(s) administered	Sample size	Margin of error	Michelle Wu	Josh Kraft	Undecided
Emerson College	September 2–3, 2025	555 (LV)	± 4.1%	73%	22%	5%

=== Results ===
General election results
Candidate	Votes	%
Michelle Wu (incumbent)	78,997	93.24
Josh Kraft write-in votes; withdrawn candidate	1,128	1.33
Domingos DaRosa write-in votes	114	0.13
Robert Cappuci write-in votes	57	0.07
other write-ins/scattering	4,426	5.22
Total votes	84,722	100.00
