= Senator Hennigan =

Senator Hennigan may refer to:

- Gilbert Franklin Hennigan (1883–1960), Louisiana State Senate
- James W. Hennigan Jr. (1927–2020), Massachusetts State Senate
- James W. Hennigan Sr. (1890–1969), Massachusetts State Senate
