= James Hennigan =

James Hennigan may refer to:

- James W. Hennigan Jr. (1927–2020), American politician
- James W. Hennigan Sr. (1890–1969), his father, American businessman and politician
