= Loretta Lees =

Professor at Boston University

Loretta Lees MAE, FAcSS, FHEA
- Born: Manchester, UK

Academic background
- Education: University of Edinburgh (PhD); Queen's University of Belfast (BA Hons)

Academic work
- Discipline: Geography
- Institutions: Boston University; Initiative on Cities; London Housing Panel; University of Leicester; King's College London
- Main interests: Urban Geography; Gentrification; Urban Sociology; Urban Studies; Human Geography

Loretta Lees is a university professor, urbanist, author, and scholar-activist. She is the Director of the Initiative on Cities and professor of sociology at Boston University. Prior to moving to Boston, she was Professor of Human Geography at the University of Leicester in the UK and served as Chair of the London Housing Panel working with the Mayor of London and Trust for London. Since 2009, she has co-organised The Urban Salon, a London forum and seminar series for architecture, cities, and international urbanism, which examines urban experiences using an international and comparative frame. Lees’ scholarship focuses on gentrification, Urban Regeneration, global urbanism, urban policy, urban public space, architecture, and urban social theory. She was identified as the only woman in the top 20 most referenced authors in urban geography worldwide and the top author on gentrification globally. She was awarded the 2022 Marilyn J. Gittell Activist Scholar Award from the Urban Affairs Association. Other accolades of Lees include her election as a fellow of Academia Europaea (MAE) in 2022, and Academy of Social Sciences (FAcSS) in 2013. She has published 16 books and over 100 journal articles and book chapters. Her research has been featured extensively in documentaries, newspapers, and in podcasts.

She received a PhD from the University of Edinburgh and a BA (Hons) in Geography from Queen's University of Belfast. Lees was born in Manchester, England, to a Northern Irish mother and Mancunian father. The Lees side of her family originated in Salford; her first cousin Mike Holden held the British heavyweight boxing title in 2000. She currently resides in both Boston and London.

== Academic career ==
In 2013 she joined the University of Leicester as Professor of Human Geography and Director of Research, where she worked until 2022. She was Professor of Human Geography and Chair of the Cities Research Group at King's College London from 1997 to 2013. From 1995 to 1997, she was a Post-Doctoral Research Fellow in geography at the University of British Columbia in Canada and a visiting lecturer in geography at the University of Waikato in New Zealand in 1994.

Professor Lees became Director of the Initiative on Cities at Boston University in September 2022, where she is also a tenured professor of sociology.

== Research ==
Lees has been at the forefront of authorship on gentrification globally, coining the term "super-gentrification" in relation to the resurgence of a new form of gentrification in Brooklyn Heights, New York City at the beginning of the 21st century and used it in reference to Barnsbury in London. Her 2008 book Gentrification focused on the development of theories and concepts in gentrification studies, and looked at how gentrification as a process had mutated over time, particularly in Anglo-America. Her 2016 Planetary Gentrification took the lens global and informed by comparative urbanism looked at ideologies and practices of gentrification in different parts of the world. Lees has also been at the forefront of researching state-led gentrification in London: she undertook Antipode Foundation and ESRC funded research on the demolition and redevelopment of council estates in London and presented evidence in three public inquiries. Working with Just Space and the London Tenants Federation, she co-produced Staying Put: An Anti-gentrification Handbook for Council Estates in London and a website estatewatch.london. With the late Italian urbanist Sandra Annunziata, she also produced an anti-gentrification toolkit for Southern European cities. Her work has been cited over 23,750 times and she has a h-index of 56.

== Books ==
Lees has published 16 books in geography and urban studies.

1. Lees, L. and Demeritt, D. (eds) (2023) Concise Encyclopedia of Human Geography, Edward Elgar.
2. Lees, L., Slater, T. and Wyly, E. (2023) The Planetary Gentrification Reader, Routledge: New York.
3. Lees, L. and Warwick, E. (2022) Defensible Space on the Move: Mobilisation in English Housing Policy and Practice, RGS-IBG Book Series, Wiley.
4. Annunziata, S. and Lees, L. (2020) Staying Put: An Anti-gentrification Handbook for Southern European cities
5. Lees, L. with Phillips, M. (eds) (2018) Handbook of Gentrification Studies, Edward Elgar.
6. Lees, L., Shin, H. and Lopez-Morales, E. (2016) Planetary Gentrification Polity Press: Cambridge.
7. Lees, L., Shin, H. and Lopez-Morales, E. (eds) (2015) Global Gentrifications: uneven development and displacement, Policy Press: Bristol.
8. Imrie, R. and Lees, L. (eds) (2014) Sustainable London? The Future of a Global City, Policy Press: Bristol.
9. The London Tenants Federation, Lees, L., Just Space and SNAG (2014) Staying Put: An Anti-Gentrification Handbook for Council Estates in London.
10. Bridge, G., Butler, T., and Lees, L. (eds) (2011) Mixed Communities: Gentrification by Stealth?, Policy Press: Bristol.
11. Lees, L., Slater, T. and Wyly, E. (2010) The Gentrification Reader, Routledge: London.
12. Imrie, R., Lees, L. and Raco, M. (eds) (2009) Regenerating London: Governance, Sustainability and Community in a Global City, Routledge: London.
13. Kitchen, R. and Thrift, N. (eds in chief) with Anderson, K., Castree, N., Cloke, P., Crampton, J., Crang, M., Domosh, M., Graham, B., Hadjimichalis, C., Hubbard, P., Kearns, R., Kwan, M-P., Lees, L., McLafferty, S., Paasi, A., Philo, C., Sidaway, J., Willis, K., Yeung, H. (eds) (2009) The International Encyclopedia of Human Geography, Elsevier.
14. Lees, L., Slater, T. and Wyly, E. (2008) Gentrification, Routledge: New York.
15. Lees, L. (ed) (2004) The Emancipatory City: Paradoxes and Possibilities?, Sage: London.
16. Hoggart, K., Lees, L. and Davies, A. (2002) Researching Human Geography, Arnold, Oxford University Press, USA.

== Editorial work ==
Lees has served on numerous editorial boards, including the Journal of Urban Affairs, Urban Geography, Transactions of the Institute of British Geographers, Environment and Planning A, City and Society, Urban Planning, Dialogues in Human Geography, The Canadian Geographer, ACME.

She currently sits on the editorial boards of Dialogues in Urban Research, Sustainability, Art and the Public Sphere, Geography Compass – Urban Geography.

== Selected honours and awards ==
- Academia Europaea – Elected Fellow (2022)
- Urban Affairs Association – Marilyn J. Gittell Activist Scholar Award (2022)
- University of Leicester Citizen's Award – Shortlisted for Best PhD Supervisor (2022)
- ESRC Impact Prize – Outstanding impact on society – Shortlisted (2019)
- University of Leicester Discovering Excellence Award – Shortlisted for impact (2018)
- Higher Education Academy – Elected Fellow (2018)
- Academy of Social Science – Elected Fellow (2013)
- Royal Society for the Arts – Elected Fellow (2012)
