= John Hancock Financial =

American insurance company

John Hancock Life Insurance Company, U.S.A.
- Type: Subsidiary
- Traded as: NYSE: JHF (2000-2004)
- Genre: Insurance and financial services
- Founded: 1862; 164 years ago
- Headquarters: 200 Berkeley Street; Boston, Massachusetts, U.S.
- Key people: Brooks Tingle (president and CEO)
- Products: Life insurance, mutual funds, Long term care insurance, Retirement plan services, College savings plans
- Number of employees: 6,700
- Parent: Manulife Financial
- Website: johnhancock.com

John Hancock Life Insurance Company, U.S.A. is an American insurance company based in Boston. Established April 21, 1862, it was named in honor of John Hancock, a prominent American Patriot.

In 2004, Canadian multinational life insurance company Manulife Financial acquired John Hancock and operates it as an independent subsidiary. The company and the majority of Manulife's U.S. assets continue to operate under the John Hancock name.

== History ==
On April 21, 1862, the charter of the John Hancock Mutual Life Insurance Company was approved by John A. Andrew, governor of Massachusetts.

There was not always a standardization for how the company name has been referenced. For example, a John Hancock advertisement from 1912 refers to the company as "John Hancock Mutual Life Insurance Company," but some John Hancock advertisements and newspaper articles from the 1930s refer to it as the "John Hancock Life Insurance Company." However, 1940s sources again refer to the company as the "John Hancock Mutual Life Insurance Company."

In 1964, the company financed the construction of the John Hancock Center (now known as 875 Michigan Avenue) in Chicago, which was the second tallest building in the world upon completion in 1969. The company sold the naming rights in 2018.

In 1972, Dr. Mary Ella Robertson was named as the first black woman and first female to serve on the John Hancock Board.

In 2000, led by David D'Alessandro, the company "demutualized," meaning that "John Hancock Mutual Life Insurance Company" formally ceased to exist, and a new company named "John Hancock Financial Services, Inc." came into existence. Policyholders received shares in the new company in exchange for giving up ownership in the old. Life insurance continued to be sold by an entity known as the "John Hancock Variable Life Insurance Company", a subsidiary of John Hancock Financial Services Inc. On January 27, 2000, shares of Hancock stock started to trade on the New York Stock Exchange under the symbol JHF.

On September 29, 2003, Manulife Financial of Canada announced its intent to acquire John Hancock for $10.4 billion. The merged entity would be led by D'Alessandro, but he would step down in June 2004. The sale also included a Canadian subsidiary of John Hancock, Maritime Life; it was integrated into Manulife's Canadian operations.

== Headquarters ==
The headquarters and its 1,100 employees are based in 200 Berkeley Street, sometimes known as the "Old John Hancock Building" and 197 Clarendon Street. John Hancock no longer has a presence in the Back Bay tower at 200 Clarendon Street, still known by many Bostonians as the Hancock Tower. The company was headquartered at 601 Congress Street in the Seaport District from 2005 to 2018, when it consolidated with offices it had retained in the Back Bay.

== Investor Sentiment Index ==
John Hancock created an index called the "John Hancock Investor Sentiment Index" in 2011. The company describes the index as a "quarterly measure of investors' views on a range of investment choices, life goals and economic outlook."

== Leadership ==
In October 2017, Marianne Harrison became the first female president and chief executive officer of John Hancock. She earned a reported $4.4 million in compensation in 2017.

On March 3, 2023, Brooks Tingle was named the new President and CEO, effective April 1, 2023, with Marianne Harrison retiring after 20 years with the company. Mr. Tingle announced his leadership plans for the company to enhance human longevity and health in Boston as a longevity hub.

== See also ==
- John Hancock Bowl, a college football bowl game the company previously sponsored in El Paso, Texas
- USS Hancock (CV-19), a WW2 Aircraft carrier named after the company raised enough war bonds
