= Initiative on Cities =

Urban research center at Boston University

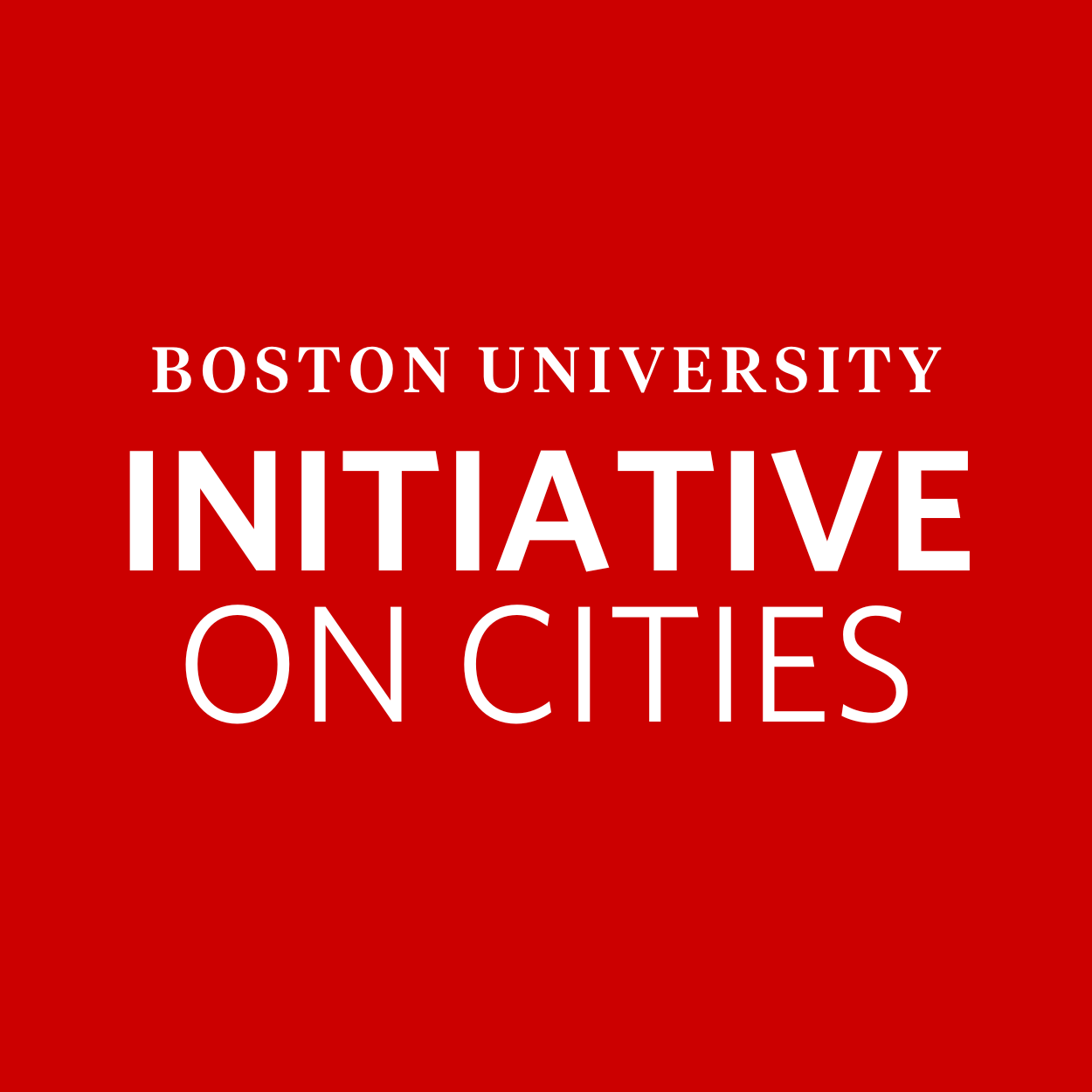
- Established: 2014
- Founders: Thomas Menino, Graham Wilson
- Headquarters: 75 Bay State Road, Boston, MA, 02215
- Fields: Urban Studies; Research; Public Policy
- Director: Loretta Lees
- Executive Director: Stacy Fox
- Affiliations: Boston University
- Website: http://www.bu.edu/ioc/

The Initiative on Cities (IOC or IoC) is an interdisciplinary center at Boston University. It serves as a hub for urban research and experiential learning, and engages with urban leaders, policymakers, academics, communities, and students worldwide to work toward sustainable, just, and inclusive urban transformation.

The Initiative is located at 75 Bay State Road in a historic brownstone on the Charles River Campus of Boston University.

== Leadership ==
The Initiative was founded in 2014 by Boston's longest-serving Mayor, Thomas Menino, who stepped down after twenty years in office, and Boston University Professor and Chair of Political Science Graham Wilson. Katharine Lusk joined as executive director from the Menino Administration, where she had led efforts to make Boston “the premier city for working women.” She created the Boston Women's Workforce Council. Lusk was named co-director in 2019.

In 2022, Loretta Lees joined as the new Director and Professor of Sociology, following Professor Wilson's retirement. Lees, a British urban geographer, previously worked at the University of Leicester and King's College London. From 2020 to 2022, Lees served as Chair of the London Housing Panel, a partnership between the Mayor of London and Trust for London that engages the community and voluntary sectors as advisors on housing policy. Stacy Fox, a Boston University alum and city planner, was named Executive Director in May 2023.

== Research ==
The Initiative on Cities leads and catalyzes major urban research efforts at Boston University. It is a member of the Global Urban Network, a university-based collective of urban institutes across five continents.

=== Menino Survey of Mayors ===
The annual Menino Survey of Mayors, named in honor of the late IOC Co-founder and Boston Mayor Tom Menino, was created by the Initiative on Cities in 2014. It is the only systematic, nationally representative survey of U.S. mayoral priorities and concerns. The Menino Survey covers timely issues affecting cities, including housing affordability, poverty, the racial wealth gap, public health, infrastructure, policing, parks and public space, homelessness, and the impacts of the COVID-19 pandemic. Survey collaborators and funders have included Citi, The Rockefeller Foundation, the National League of Cities (NLC), Trust for Public Land, and Community Solutions. In addition to elevating mayoral priorities via widespread media coverage, the research team has deepened the academic literature on U.S. mayoral leadership and decision making.

The Menino Survey team includes Boston University Associate Professors of Political Science, Katherine Levine Einstein, David Glick and Maxwell Palmer, IOC staff Stacy Fox and Katharine Lusk, and others. The project has inspired multiple international survey efforts, with the support of the Boston University team, including the “Urban Voices: UK City Leaders Survey” led by Centre for Cities and Arup, the “Canadian Municipal Barometer,” and the Global Survey of City Leaders led by Cornell University.

=== Federally Funded Research and Programs ===
The Initiative on Cities has supported federally funded research programs led by faculty across multiple academic departments.

==== Environment ====
The Initiative was part of the CO_{2} Urban Synthesis and Analysis Network (CO_{2} USA), a multi-year project funded by the National Oceanic and Atmospheric Administration, which brought together scientific researchers and local stakeholders to standardize greenhouse gas emissions measures (CO_{2} and CH_{4}) at spatial and temporal scales that would have utility for cities. It also helps to convene workshops and conferences funded by the National Science Foundation, including Sustainable Urban Systems and the Street of the Future.

==== Civic Technology ====
The Initiative convened a series of workshops on effective practices in city/university/industry “smart cities” collaboration, with support from the National Science Foundation. It has also led research in the field of public interest technology, with support from the Public Interest Technology University Network, of which Boston University is a member.

=== Boston Research ===
As a major urban university with a longstanding commitment to its home city, research in, on and with the City of Boston and Bostonians is a key priority. The Initiative has supported and led research on various issues concerning Boston residents, including the region's high housing costs, racial inequality, the changing climate, and youth engagement practices.

== Education ==
=== Experiential Learning ===
The Initiative runs place-based experiential learning programs for hundreds of Boston University undergraduate and graduate students, via its MetroBridge program and summer internships. MetroBridge, launched in 2018, sources projects from cities for students to undertake as class projects across various academic departments. By 2022, MetroBridge had served more than 1,000 students at Boston University.

The Initiative's paid summer internship & fellowship program matches students with roles in local governments to work on issues such as racial equity, housing, sustainability, and innovation. Host cities have included Boston MA, Chelsea MA, Providence RI, Sydney, Australia and Manchester, UK.

The Initiative also runs the year-long National League of Cities (NLC) Menino Fellowship program. The National League of Cities created it to honor Menino, who had helped to found the NLC Institute for Youth, Education and Families in 2000 and includes a paid semester-long internship for a Boston University undergraduate student with the NLC in Washington, DC.

=== Urban Studies Minor ===
The Initiative created Boston University's Urban Studies minor, which the Boston University Department of Political Science administers. The Initiative on Cities awards a student prize to a graduating senior minoring in Urban Studies each year.

=== Doctoral Programs ===
The Initiative supports doctoral students across Boston University, leading original research on cities and urban populations by providing research stipends and supporting peer learning opportunities. It is also part of BU URBAN, an interdisciplinary PhD program which prepares students in Biogeoscience, Environmental Health, and Statistics to tackle urban environmental challenges.

== Global Engagement ==
The Initiative on Cities engages with urban academic institutes, think tanks and mayors worldwide. In 2017, it partnered with the UK-based Centre for Cities to host the UK-International Metro Mayors Summit, which brought a cohort of US mayors to London for a three-day convening with the first directly elected mayors of metropolitan regions in the UK. In 2019, the Initiative worked with a coalition of big city housing commissioners and Enterprise Community Partners to host the Global Innovations in Urban Housing conference. From 2017 to 2020, it ran an executive education program on cities for the global design firm, Arup, with in-depth site work in Boston, Hangzhou, and Singapore.
