= Marianne Harrison =

Financial services executive

Marianne Harrison is a Canadian-born financial services executive. She earned her bachelor's degree from the University of Western Ontario and a diploma in accounting from Wilfrid Laurier University. She is a Chartered Professional Accountant and a Fellow of Chartered Professional Accountants (FCPA). In 2017, she was appointed as president and CEO of John Hancock Financial after having served as president of Manulife Canada since 2012.

== Education and career ==
Harrison began working for an accounting firm and held several roles with the Toronto Dominion Bank before earning the role of chief financial officer for TD's Wealth Management Group, a position she held for five years before joining Manulife Financial.

In 2016, she was made a Fellow of Chartered Professional Accountants which is the highest honor of the association.

== Manulife and John Hancock ==
Harrison left TD to become Manulife's executive vice-president and corporate controller in 2003. In 2007 she was recognized by the Globe and Mail as one of the 100 Most Powerful Women in Canada. She moved to the US in 2012 to take on the role of president and general manager, John Hancock Insurance Long Term Care.

In 2012 it was announced that Paul Rooney, then president of Manulife Canada, would assume the role of Manulife's global COO. Harrison was moved into the role of president and CEO of Manulife Canada, where she was responsible for all aspects of the diversified and balanced insurance and investment business provided by Manulife’s Canadian Division.

Harrison was made president and CEO of John Hancock Financial in 2017. The role had been previously held by Michael Doughty on an interim basis until Harrison's successful bid for the role.

She was the first female to lead Manulife Canada and John Hancock Financial.

Harrison serves as president and chairman of the boards for John Hancock Life Insurance Company (U.S.A.) and John Hancock Life Insurance Company of New York.

== Awards and recognition ==
- Globe and Mail Top 100 most powerful women in Canada - 2007
- Boston Business Journal Power 50 - 2019
- American Business Awards - Woman of the Year – Business Services Industries - 2020
- The New England Council - New Englanders of the Year - 2020
- Atlanta Business Chronicle Women Who Mean Business - 2020

== Personal life ==
Harrison is the mother of four children.
