= 2005 Boston mayoral election =

Election in Massachusetts, United States

- November 8, 2005
- Turnout: 36% (registered voters)
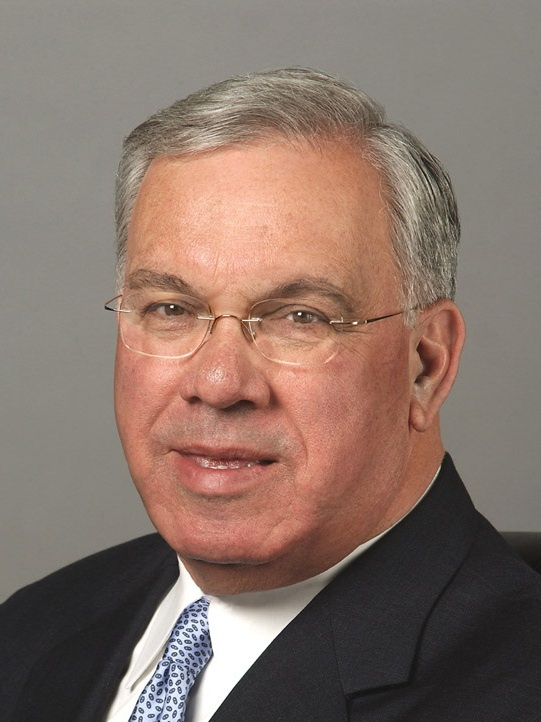

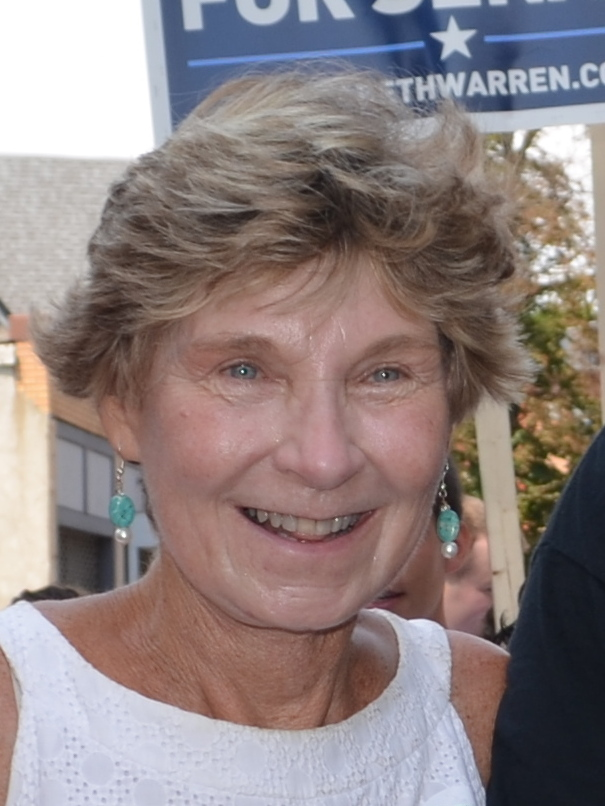
Candidate	Thomas Menino	Maura Hennigan
Party	Nonpartisan	Nonpartisan
Popular vote	64,001	30,468
Percentage	67.52%	32.14%
- Menino: 40–50% 50–60% 60–70% 70–80% 80–90% 90–100% Hennigan: 50–60% 60–70% Tie: 40–50%
Mayor before election
Thomas Menino
Elected mayor
Thomas Menino

The 2005 Boston mayoral election occurred on Tuesday, November 8, 2005, between incumbent mayor Thomas Menino and City Councilor Maura Hennigan. Menino was re-elected to a fourth term.

As Menino and Hennigan were the only two candidates, no preliminary election was held. 36% of registered voters turned out to vote in the election.

== Candidates ==
- Maura Hennigan, Boston City Councilor since 1982
- Thomas Menino, Mayor of Boston since 1993

== Endorsements ==
Maura Hennigan

Organizations

- Democracy for America

Newspapers

- The Daily Free Press
Tom Menino

Labor unions

- United Association Local 537

== Results ==
Candidates	General Election	
Candidates	Votes	%
Thomas Menino (incumbent)	64,001	67.52
Maura Hennigan	30,468	32.14

== See also ==
- List of mayors of Boston, Massachusetts
