= Transhealth =

Health center

- Established: 2021; 5 years ago
- Founded at: Western Massachusetts
- Legal status: 501(c)(3)
- Region served: Western-Mass, The Berkshires, New England, Vermont, New Hampshire, New York, and National
- Methods: Gender-Affirming Healthcare, Research, Advocacy, Education, Community
- CEO: Joan Erwin
- Website: https://transhealth.org

Transhealth, Inc. is an American independent and comprehensive trans healthcare center that services trans and gender-diverse individuals and families. Transhealth was founded in Western Massachusetts in 2021 to provide clinical care, research, advocacy, and education related to gender-affirming healthcare.

== History ==
=== Needs assessment ===
The PATH Project (Plan and Act for Transgender Health), a needs assessment conducted as a partnership between local gender-diverse community members and staff from The Fenway Institute, Cooley Dickinson Health Care, and Harvard Medical School, was designed to inform the creation of Transhealth.

=== Founding ===
Transhealth was incorporated in Massachusetts on October 16, 2020. Its founding president and chief executive officer was Dallas Ducar, who led the organization until 2024, when Joan Erwin was named interim CEO.

Transhealth opened on May 4, 2021.The healthcare center began by providing care for trans and gender-diverse people of all ages in Western Massachusetts clinical services including: primary adult care, pediatric care, gender-affirming hormonal care, and mental healthcare. A range of non-clinical services were also in the vision to support the community, research, education, and advocacy. These pillars of clinical care, research, education, and advocacy were advanced through local partnerships, educating students, collaboration with policy advocates, and expanding patient care.

=== Clinical care ===
Transhealth is attempting to serve the needs of the estimated 20,000 trans and gender-diverse individuals across different parts of New England. Transhealth currently serves 2500 patients and thousands of additional community members. Now, Transhealth is a member of the New England Gender C.A.R.E Consortium.

=== Advocacy ===
Transhealth advanced policy change by commenting on moves by the federal and state government. Transhealth advocates for the need for increased healthcare access through telehealth and interstate licensure, and expanding reimbursement and incentives for gender-affirming care. Transhealth is a member of the National LGBTQI Health Roundtable.

=== Education ===
Transhealth is involved in educational initiatives across Western Massachusetts and nationally and provides clinical training for medical students and other allied health professionals.

=== Research ===
Transhealth has assisted in the development of the Endocrine Nurses Society Position Statement on Transgender and Gender Diverse Care. Transhealth plans to continue community-based participatory research once the organization has developed an Institutional Review Board.
