= James W. Hennigan Jr. =

American politician (1927–2020)

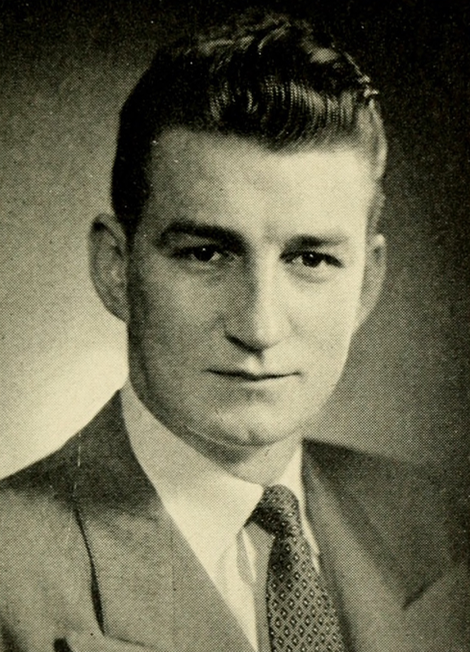

Suffolk County Register of Probate
- In office 1973–1979
- Preceded by: Louis F. Musco
- Succeeded by: James Michael Connolly

Chairman of the Boston School Committee
- In office 1972–1972
- Preceded by: Paul R. Tierney
- Succeeded by: Paul R. Tierney

Member of the Massachusetts Senate from the 5th Suffolk district
- In office 1955–1965
- Preceded by: John F. Collins
- Succeeded by: Stephen Davenport

Member of the Massachusetts House of Representatives from the 18th Suffolk district
- In office 1953–1955

Personal details
- Born: James William Hennigan Jr. March 17, 1927 Boston, Massachusetts, US
- Died: January 3, 2020 (aged 92) Boston, Massachusetts, US
- Party: Democratic Party
- Education: Babson Institute; Suffolk University Law School
- Occupation: Lawyer; Insurance broker

James William Hennigan Jr. (March 17, 1927 – January 3, 2020) was an American politician who served in the Massachusetts House of Representatives from 1953 to 1955 and in the Massachusetts Senate from 1955 to 1965.

Hennigan graduated from Babson Institute Suffolk University Law School. He served as a member of the Massachusetts House of Representatives from 1953 to 1955, the Massachusetts Senate from 1955 to 1965 and a member of the Boston School Committee from 1970 to 1974.

Hennigan ran for mayor of Boston in 1959, but lost that election. He was also the Democratic nominee for Massachusetts Attorney General in 1964, but lost to Edward Brooke. His father James W. Hennigan Sr. also served in the Massachusetts General Court.

Hennigan is the titular hennigan of the Morgan v. Hennigan decision, since he was head of the Boston School Committee at the time. However, Hennigan had been the leading advocate of trying to implement integration on the School Committee.

In 1972, Hennigan was elected to a six-year term as the Suffolk County Register of Probate.

Hennigan's daughter Maura Hennigan was a member of the Boston City Council from 1982 through 2005. He was a driving force behind his daughter's unsuccessful 2005 campaign for mayor of Boston.

Hennigan died on January 3, 2020, in Boston, Massachusetts, at age 92.

== See also ==
- 1953–1954 Massachusetts legislature
- 1955–1956 Massachusetts legislature

== Sources ==
- summary with oral history interview
- Boston Globe July 12, 2010

Party political offices
Preceded by Francis E. Kelly	Democratic nominee for Attorney General of Massachusetts; 1964	Succeeded by Francis Bellotti
