= Thomas Menino =

Mayor of Boston from 1993 to 2014

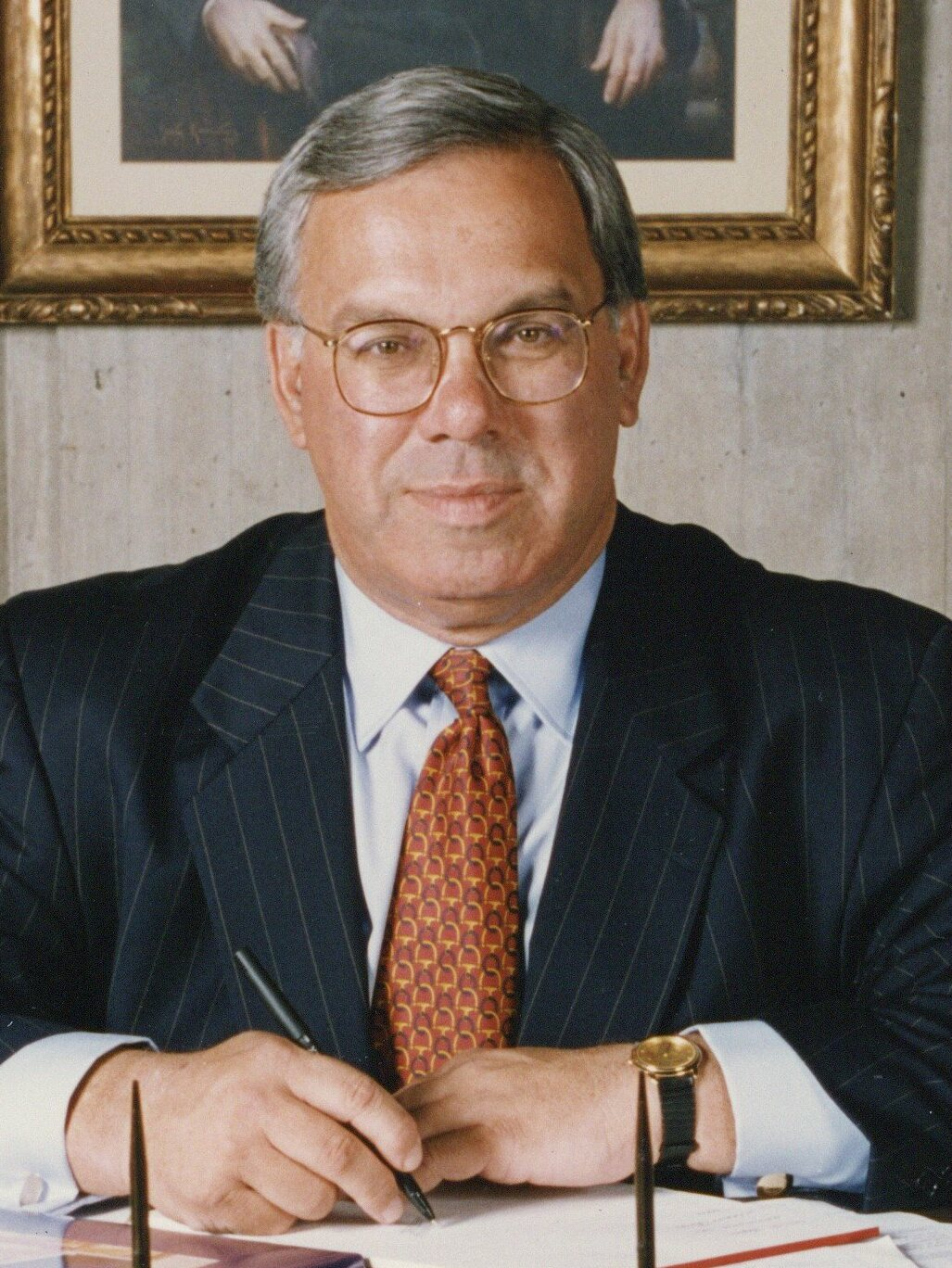
- Menino in his office, c. 1995–1998

Mayor of Boston
- In office November 16, 1993 – January 6, 2014
- Succeeded by: Marty Walsh
- Acting; July 12, 1993 – November 16, 1993
- Preceded by: Raymond Flynn

60th President of the United States Conference of Mayors
- In office 2002–2003
- Preceded by: Marc Morial
- Succeeded by: James Garner

President of the Boston City Council
- In office January 1993 – March 1993
- Preceded by: Dapper O'Neil
- Succeeded by: James Kelly

Member of the Boston City Council for the 5th district
- In office 1984–1993
- Preceded by: Constituency established
- Succeeded by: Daniel F. Conley

Personal details
- Born: Thomas Michael Menino; December 27, 1942 Boston, Massachusetts, U.S.
- Died: October 30, 2014 (aged 71) Boston, Massachusetts, U.S.
- Resting place: Fairview Cemetery
- Party: Democratic
- Spouse: Angela Faletra (m. 1966)
- Children: 2
- Education: Mount Ida College (AA); University of Massachusetts Boston (BA)
- Thomas Menino's voice Thomas Menino discusses Initiative on Cities; Recorded March 2014

Thomas Michael Menino (December 27, 1942 – October 30, 2014) was an American politician who served as the mayor of Boston, from 1993 to 2014. He was the city's longest-serving mayor. He was elected mayor in 1993 after first serving three months as acting mayor following the resignation of his predecessor Raymond Flynn. Before serving as mayor, Menino was a member of the Boston City Council and had been elected president of the City Council in 1993.

Dubbed an "urban mechanic", Menino had a reputation for focusing on "nuts and bolts" issues and enjoyed very high public approval ratings as mayor. During his tenure, Boston saw a significant amount of new development, including the Seaport District, the redevelopment of Dudley Square (today known as "Nubian Square"), and the redevelopment of the area surrounding Fenway Park. However, during his mayoralty, gentrification priced some longtime residents out of neighborhoods, and allegations were made of favoritism by Menino towards certain developers. During Menino's tenure as mayor, crime in Boston fell to unprecedented lows, and the city came to rank among the safest large cities in the United States. Menino also undertook a number of environmentally-focused actions. In the last year of Menino's tenure, the city faced the Boston Marathon bombing, an incident of domestic terrorism.

Menino was a liberal member of the Democratic Party. He led a powerful political machine in Boston and also played roles in national politics, such as serving as president of the United States Conference of Mayors from 2002 to 2003, bringing the 2004 Democratic National Convention to Boston, and co-founding the group Mayors Against Illegal Guns with New York City Mayor Michael Bloomberg. After the end of his mayoralty, he was appointed professor of political science at Boston University. He also served as co-founder and co-director of the Initiative on Cities, an urban leadership research center based at Boston University. Menino's post-mayoralty life was unexpectedly cut short as he was diagnosed with an advanced form of cancer of unknown primary origin in March 2014 and died from the disease seven months later.

== Early life and education ==
Menino was born on December 27, 1942, in Readville, a part of Boston's Hyde Park neighborhood. He was the son of Susan and Carl Menino, both of Italian descent. Readville was a largely Italian-American community. Menino's father was a factory foreman at Westinghouse Electric, and his grandparents lived on the first floor of his parents' Hyde Park home. In his youth, the Italian-American Menino was exposed to anti-Italian prejudice.

After graduating from St. Thomas Aquinas High School in Jamaica Plain in 1960. Menino enrolled in three night classes at Boston College before abandoning his college education. Menino had decided that college was not for him much to his father's dismay. Carl Menino once recalled his son's reasons for opting out of higher education: "Truman didn't go to college," the younger Menino would tell his father (President Harry S. Truman was Menino's favorite president and was his personal hero). Menino eventually received an associate degree in Business Management in 1963 at the now-defunct Mount Ida College, which was then known as Chamberlayne Junior College. During his tenure as a Boston city councilor in 1984, Menino enrolled as an undergrad at the University of Massachusetts Boston. He graduated with a Bachelor of Arts in community planning in January 1988.

== Early career ==
Prior to running for office, Menino worked as a housing relocation specialist for the Boston Redevelopment Authority, was a research assistant for the state legislative committee on housing and urban development, and served as an aide to state senator Joseph F. Timilty.

Menino met at the age of nineteen Joseph F. Timilty, who became a political mentor to him, in 1961.

Menino began working in sales at Metropolitan Life Insurance in 1963. He left the insurance industry in 1968 after Timilty got him an entry-level position at the Boston Redevelopment Authority.

Menino worked on Timilty's 1971 and 1975 mayoral campaigns. In retribution for Menino working on Timilty's effort to unseat him, Mayor Kevin White fired Menino from the Boston Redevelopment Authority. Menino again worked on Timilty's campaign in the 1979 Boston mayoral election.

== City Council career ==
Menino with Mayor Raymond Flynn during Menino's tenure as a City Councilor

Menino was elected Boston city councilor for the newly created District 5 in November 1983, capturing 75 percent of the vote against Richard E. Kenney. Timilty would later claim that District 5's boundaries had been effectively designed with the goal of designing a district that would be guaranteed to elect his protégé Menino to the Boston City Council. Menino's overall vote total of 17,561 would not be surpassed by any district council candidate until Matt O'Malley received 18,204 votes in 2013. The 1983 Boston mayoral election coincided with the City Council election, and Menino endorsed Raymond Flynn for mayor over Mel King. Menino represented District 5 for nine years. He ran unopposed for re-election in November 1985. He was again re-elected in November 1989 (running unopposed) and November 1991 (capturing 82 percent of the vote).

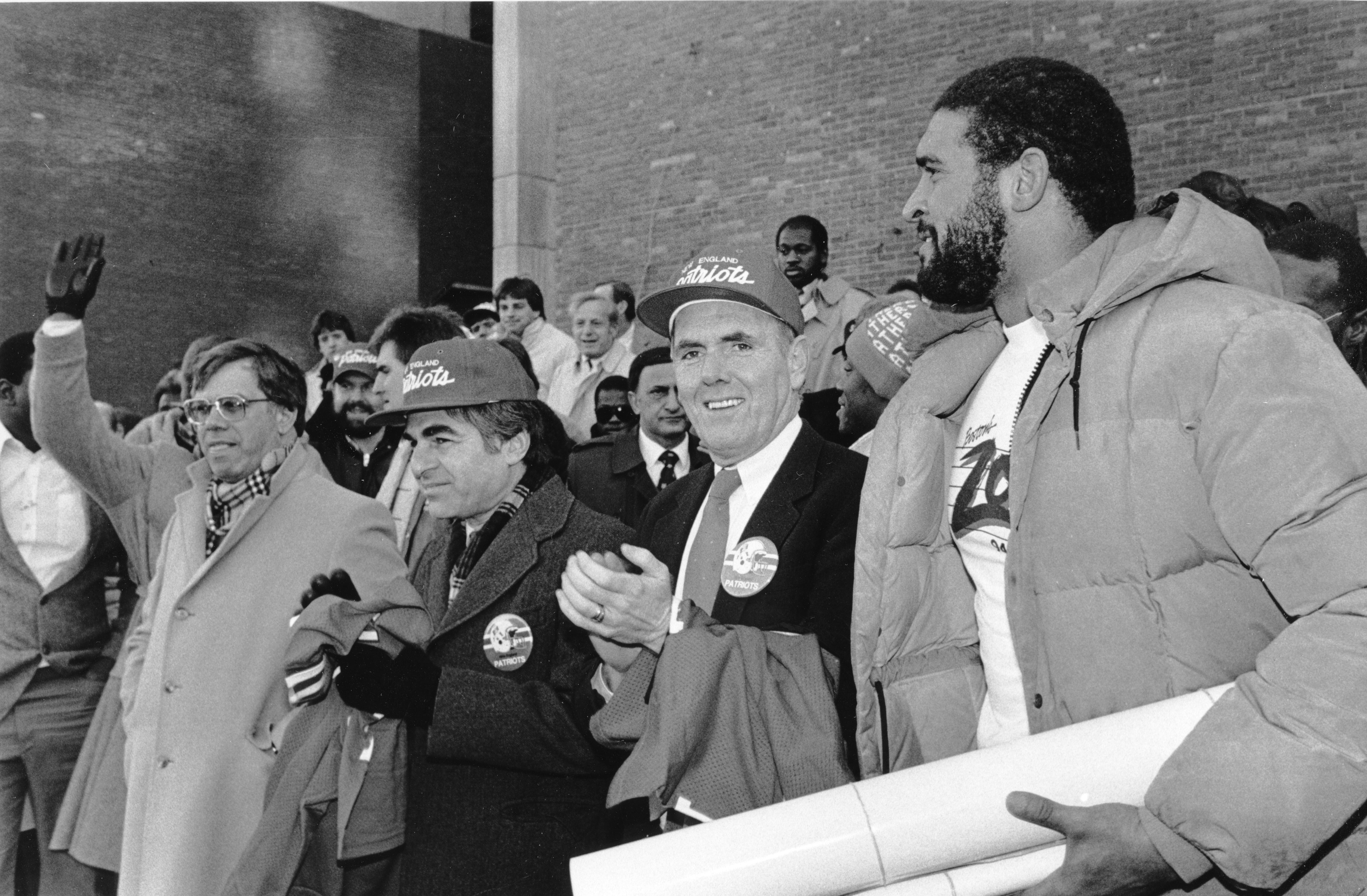
Menino (far left) at a 1985 New England Patriots rally, alongside Governor Michael Dukakis, Mayor Raymond Flynn, and player Brian Holloway

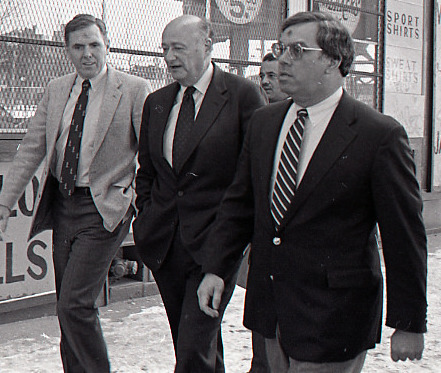
Menino walking in the Roslindale neighborhood with Mayor Flynn and New York City Mayor Ed Koch in 1986

In 1984, Menino was named chairman of the council's Planning and Development Committee. In 1988, he became chairman of the City Council's Finance Committee. This committee was renamed the City Council Ways and Means Committee in 1990, a name that it continues to hold today. He remained chairman of this committee for the remainder of his tenure as City Councilor. He earned a reputation for having a strong understanding of the city budget of how to allocate funds to assist residents. He was known to be a "vigilant watchdog of the city budget," as hailed by The Boston Globe. He was a founding member of the City Council's Tourists and Tourism Committee which was created in 1991. Menino received praise for what The Boston Globe's Adrian Walker called "aptitude for details of city government", and some criticism for his closeness to Mayor Flynn. Walker also wrote that Menino had received a reputation as a councilor, "for diligence and attention to detail." In 1993, Menino was voted by his fellow councilors to serve as president of the Boston City Council over Maura Hennigan. This had been somewhat an upset victory.

In 1986, Mayor Flynn offered Menino the position of Parks and Recreation Commissioner. In response to Flynn's proposal, Menino said it "surprised" him, but that he does "think about all opportunities that come before [him]." Menino did not assume the position but was re-elected in November 1987, with 87 percent of the vote. He also announced a candidacy for Suffolk County sheriff in 1986, but abandoned his candidacy afterward. In 1992, he planned to run for the United States Congress seat that Rep. Brian J. Donnelly (D-Dorchester) was vacating. This 11th district seat stretched from the Boston neighborhood of Dorchester through communities on the South Shore and into Plymouth County. After United States congressional apportionment left Massachusetts only 10 congressional seats, Donnelly's district disappeared, and Menino chose not to challenge Representatives from the other districts.

Menino opposed several domestic ordinances that would have expanded rights to same-sex couples in domestic partnerships, including the 1991 Family Protection Act (which would have extended benefits to any household registering itself as a family). During his 1993 mayoral campaign, his spokesperson credited this opposition to Menino believing that these ordinances too broadly defined "family" and not outright opposition to similar legislation that would more narrowly define domestic partnerships.

Menino supported proposals for clean needle distribution and condom distribution as a city councilor, both of which were aimed at preventing the transmission of HIV/AIDS. Menino's support for condom distribution included supporting distribution in schools. In his role as Ways and Means Committee chairman, Menino advocated for increasing the funding of AIDS programs. In 1988, Menino authored a 5-point plan outlining steps to stop the spread of AIDS among users of intravenous drugs, including use of needle exchanges, community health vans, street outreach workers, and increased drug rehabilitation facilities.

Menino sponsored a study by municipal government of homelessness. He also advocated as for the Boston City Hospital to be reorganized.

=== Acting mayoralty ===
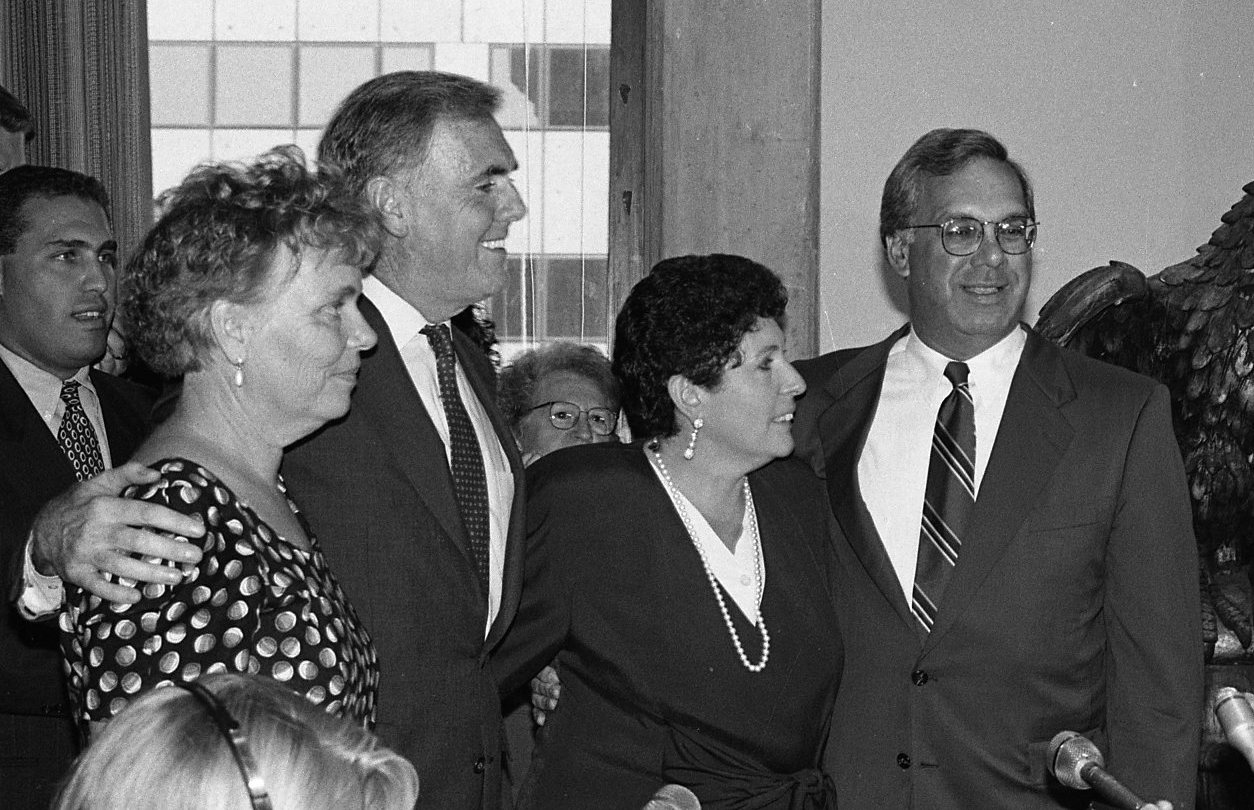
Outgoing mayor Flynn with Menino at Menino's swearing-in as acting mayor

In January 1993, Menino was elected president of the Boston City Council by a vote of its members. Councilor Anthony Crayton had cast the decisive swing vote for Menino. At the time of the vote, it was broadly recognized that Mayor Flynn was slated for a nomination to serve in the coming administration of Bill Clinton (at the time, the president-elect), and could be expected to depart the mayoralty before the expiration of his term. This positioned the individual elected to serve as city council president to also serve a stint as the acting mayor. In March 1993, Clinton formally nominated Mayor Flynn to be the United States Ambassador to the Holy See. Mayor Flynn accepted the nomination, effectively making Menino the presumptive future acting mayor.

Menino had had a longtime friendship with outgoing mayor Flynn. However, their relationship was noted to have become somewhat terser during the period in which Flynn was preparing to hand over the office to Menino. One cause for their rift was that, after Menino had promised he would appoint 100 new police officers when he took office, Flynn beat him to the chase and did so himself, which angered Menino.

Upon Flynn's resignation on July 12, 1993, Menino became acting Mayor of Boston until the upcoming November 1993 election. He was the first Italian American to lead the city. Some initially saw Menino as likely to be a sort of "caretaker" of the office, with Brian McGrory of The Boston Globe writing at the start of Menino's acting mayoralty, that to some, "Menino is believed to be a caretaker, a known quantity, a moderate compromise builder who is unlikely to bring great change or wreak serious harm on the city." McGregory also reported that some of Menino's City Council colleagues believed that Menino had an undistinguished legislative record as a city councilor.

During his acting mayoralty, Menino temporarily appointed Alfreda Harristo to fill a vacancy on the Boston School Committee. After Harristo cast the decisive vote in the Boston School Committee's rejecting of a teacher contract proposal, the Boston Teachers Union sued, questioning Menino's powers as acting mayor to make such an appointment. A judge dismissed the lawsuit for lack of standing.

In early August 1993, Menino signed a grant agreement with the state which advanced $3.7 million in state funds to be allotted for the construction of a materials recycling facility in the city.

Menino put a freeze on water utility rates in place in the city, which were at rising due to the need to pay off the expenses of a court-ordered cleanup of Boston Harbor. Menino's freeze was popular with the city's residents, though there were questions as to whether an acting mayor actually held the authority to take such action.

==== 1993 mayoral campaign ====
Menino would win the 1993 Boston mayoral election, becoming mayor. This made him the city's first non-Irish American mayor since the Great Depression.

Menino initially ran a low-profile campaign, having informally indicated his intentions ahead of taking office as acting mayor for months. After taking office as acting mayor, Menino ran a sort of "Rose Garden campaign" that played up his acting incumbency and leveraged the perks of the office. He formally declared himself as a candidate for mayor on August 16, 1993, after many other candidates had already formally entered the race. A number of actions that he took immediately after taking office were characterized by analysts as shoring up his image for a mayoral run.

When running for mayor, Menino pledged to serve "only two terms, and that's it for me." However, his tenure ultimately exceeded this in length. Menino ran for a third term in 2001 and clarified that "I promised I'd serve two terms–in every century." Menino was ultimately elected to a fifth term in 2009.

== Mayoralty ==
Menino served an unprecedented and unsurpassed five terms as mayor of Boston. On March 28, 2013, Menino announced that he would not seek a sixth term.

After Menino's death, Katherine Q. Seelye of The New York Times wrote that Menino "presided over one of the most successful urban renaissances in modern American history" as mayor.

=== Politics ===
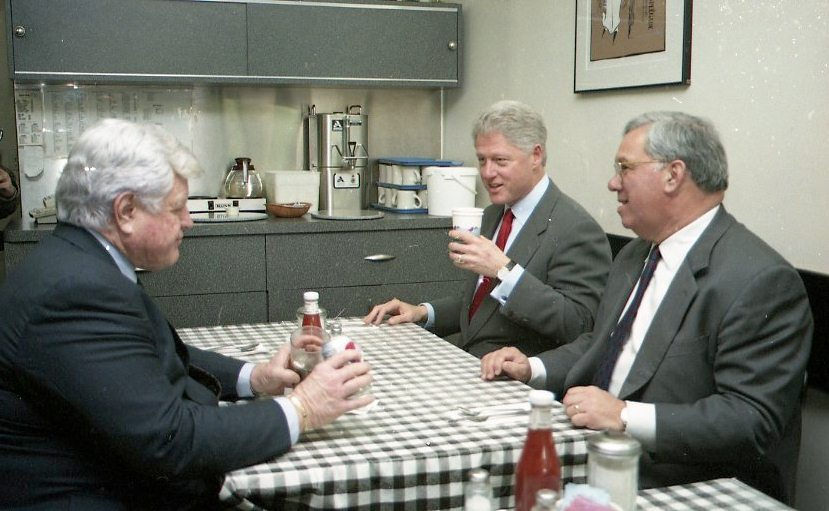
Menino with Senator Ted Kennedy and President Bill Clinton at Mike's City Diner in Boston on January 18, 2001

Menino was a liberal and a Democrat.

Menino led a powerful political machine in Boston. In 2009, the Boston Globe wrote that "Menino has assembled the most extensive political operation in modern Boston history over his 16 years in office, rivaling that of legendary mayor James Michael Curley. He's done it the old-fashioned way, by blurring the lines between politics and policy, between city work and campaign work, delivering services to everyday residents and warnings to his rare foes—many of them intended to strengthen his electoral standing."

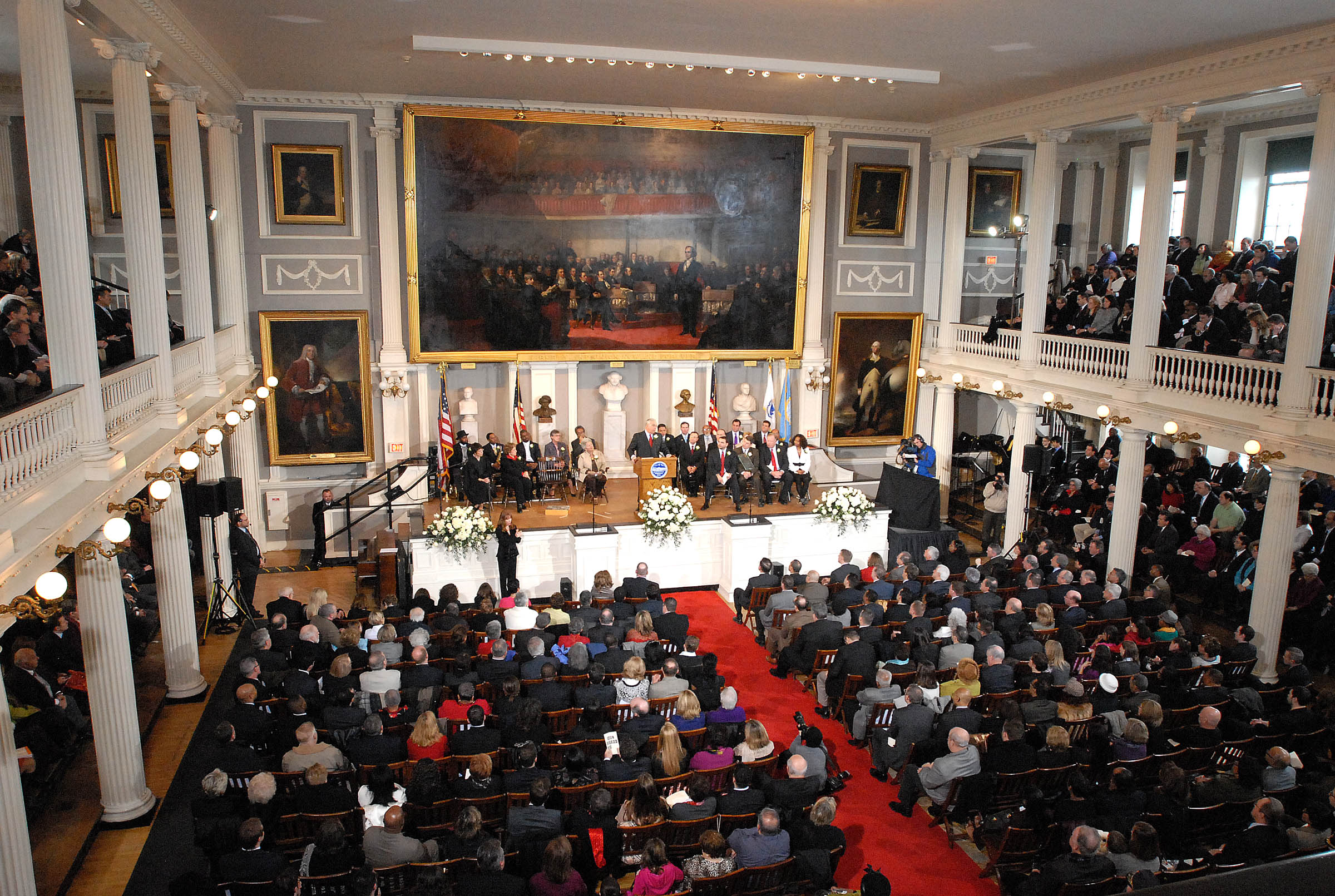
Menino's fifth mayoral inauguration, held on January 4, 2010, at Faneuil Hall

==== Reelection campaigns ====
In 1997, Menino was re-elected, running formally unopposed after no challenger managed to collect enough valid signatures to qualify for the ballot.

In the 2001 mayoral general election, Menino faced Peggy Davis-Mullen, with a third opponent, Althea Garrison, having been eliminated in the nonpartisan primary. Menino was heavily favored to win, with an approval rating near 85%. Davis-Mullen lacked in name recognition and additionally faced a slew of stories in The Boston Globe and The Boston Herald during her campaign with negative allegations that hurt her public image. Menino won 73.37% of the vote in the primary election and 76.06% of the vote in the general election.

In 2005, Menino won 67.52% of the vote against Maura Hennigan. Menino faced a negative campaign from Henigan, who blamed Menino for the city's high cost of living and a recent rise in its crime rate. However, Menino had stayed above the fray, largely not responding to her attacks.

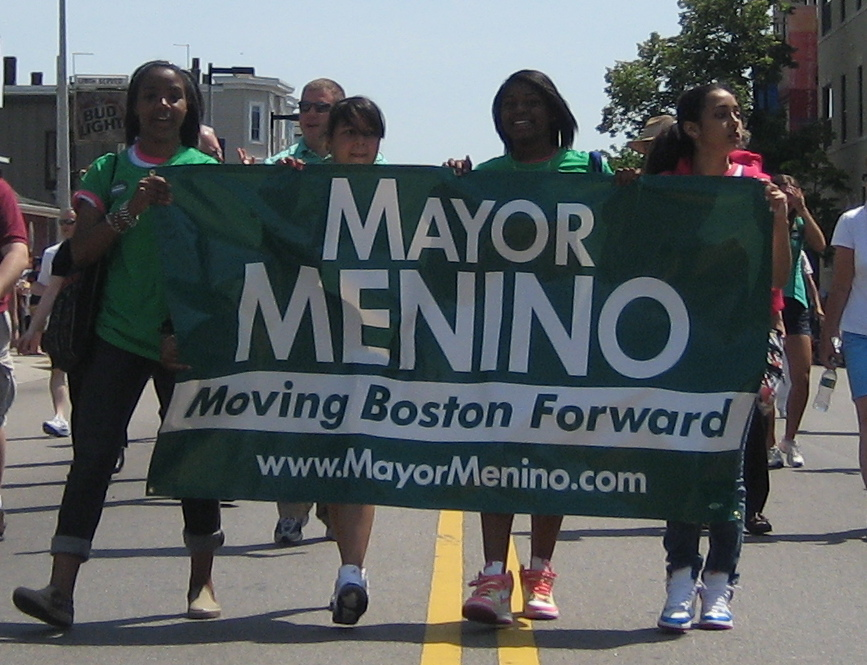
Supporters of Menino's 2009 reelection campaign marching in the 2009 Dorchester Day Parade

In the 2009 general election, Menino faced Michael F. Flaherty after Sam Yoon and Kevin McCrea were eliminated in the nonpartisan primary. Menino won 50.52% of the vote in the primary and 57.27% of the vote in the general election.

==== National politics ====
In May 2002, Menino was elected president of the United States Conference of Mayors. He held this role for thirteen months.

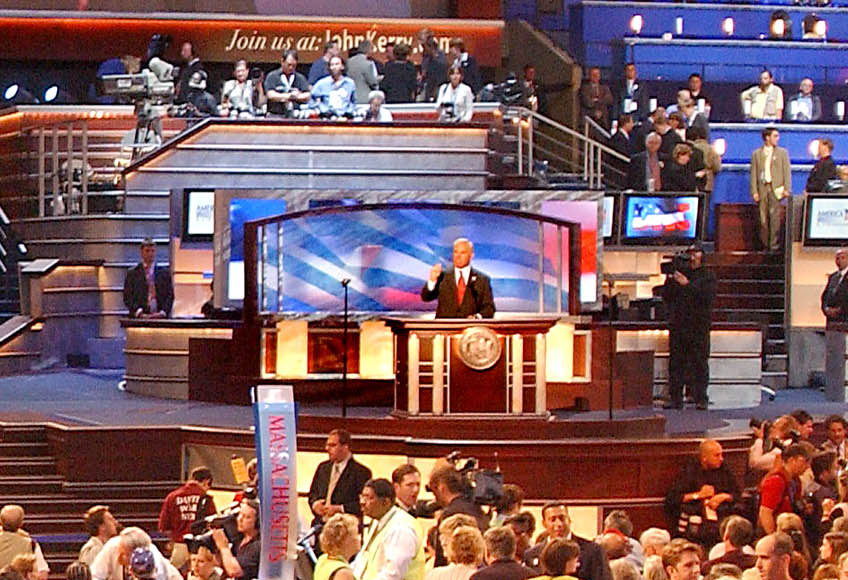
Menino welcomes delegates to the 2004 DNC

Menino brought the Democratic National Convention to Boston in 2004. The convention was controversial due to fundraising difficulties, security concerns, protests by unions, and inconvenience to residents. But Menino estimated that the convention generated $150 million in business for the city; meanwhile, other estimates suggest that the convention generated $14.8 million for the city.

On April 25, 2006, Menino and New York City Mayor Michael Bloomberg hosted a summit at Gracie Mansion in New York City, during which the Mayors Against Illegal Guns Coalition was formed. The coalition stated its goal of "making the public safer by getting illegal guns off the streets"—Menino remained co-chair there until he left the office. The initial group consisted of 15 mayors; the 15 drafted and signed a statement of principles and set a goal to expand their membership to 50 mayors by the end of 2006. That goal was met six months ahead of schedule and led to its current membership of more than 900 mayors, with members from both major political parties and 40 states.

Menino supported the 2008 presidential campaign of Hillary Clinton, sending his own campaign workers to New Hampshire to work for her candidacy ahead of the 2008 New Hampshire Democratic presidential primary.

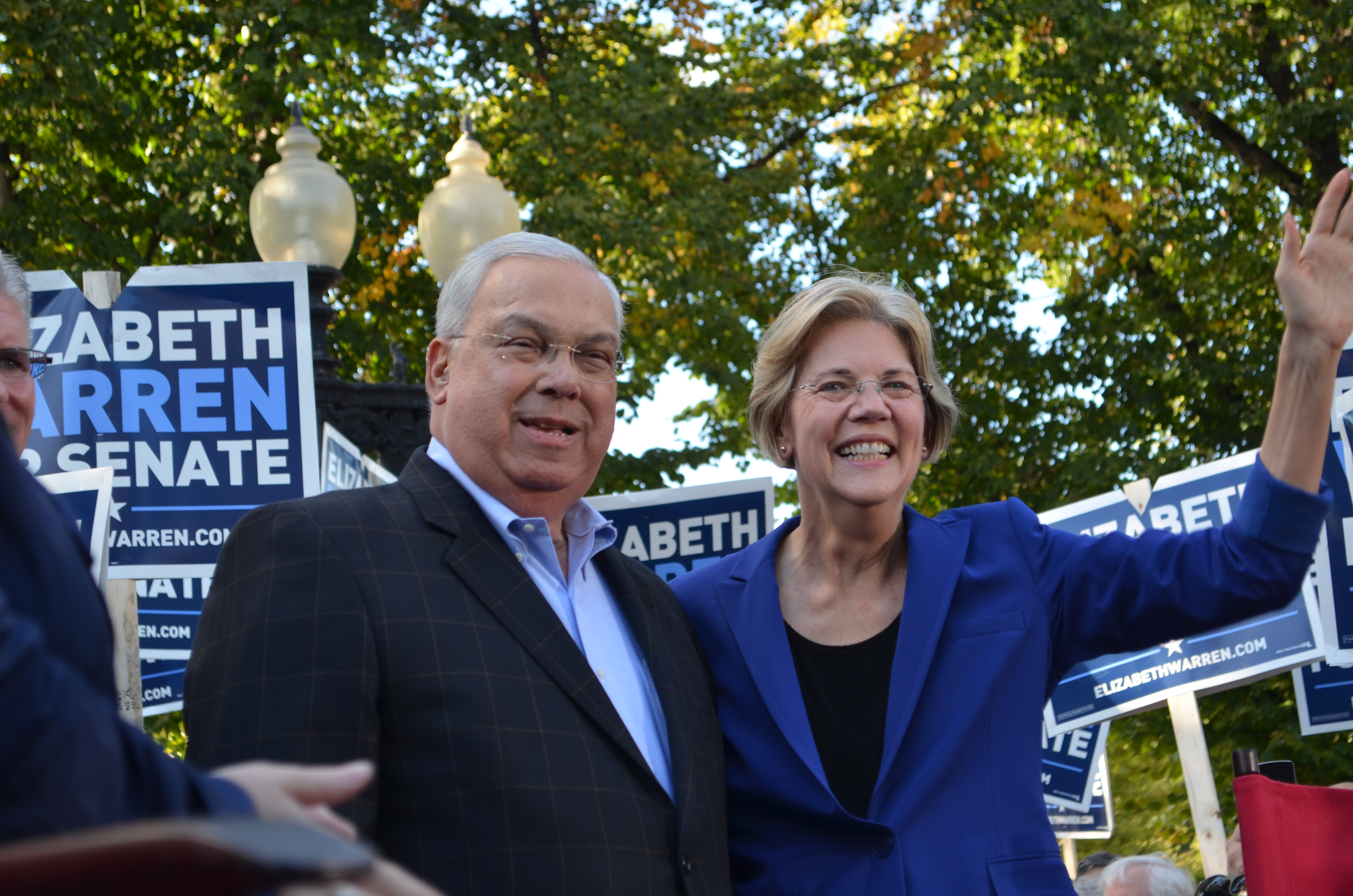
Menino with Elizabeth Warren at the event where he endorsed her for U.S. Senate

Menino spoke at the 2012 Democratic National Convention. In September 2012, he endorsed Democratic nominee Elizabeth Warren in the 2012 United States Senate election in Massachusetts.

=== Fiscal matters ===
Throughout Menino's tenure, the city of Boston had an operating surplus. This led Moody's Investors Service and Standard & Poor's to boost the city's bond rating a combined nine times over the course of Menino's mayoralty.

=== Social issues ===
Menino was a cofounder of Mayors Against Illegal Guns.

Menino supported abortion rights. He also supported public funding of abortions.

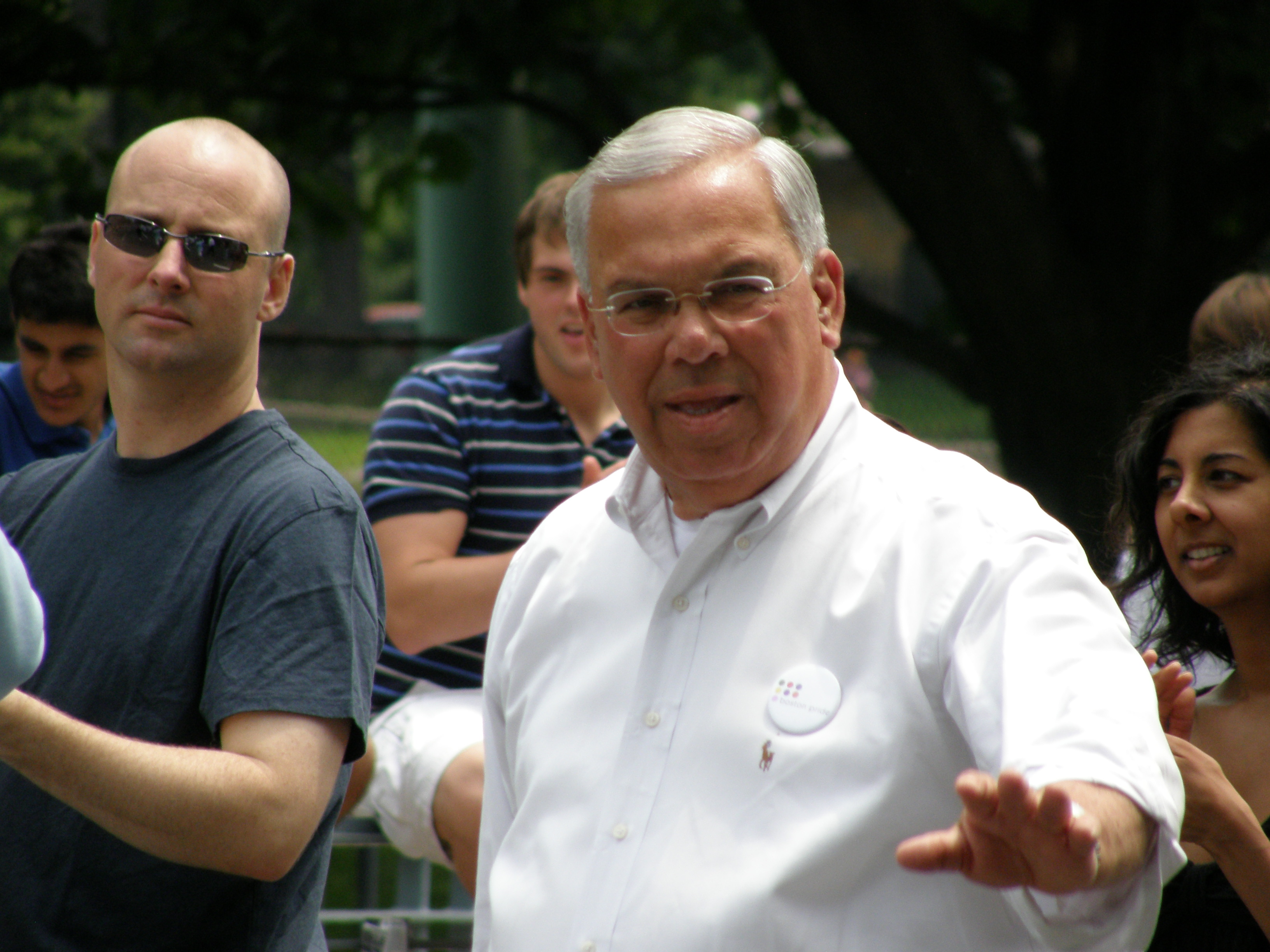
Mayor Menino at the city's 2008 pride parade

Menino was a supporter of gay rights. By the time he was elected mayor in 1993, Menino had already taken the public position of supporting that gay and lesbian couples be allowed to act as foster parents. At the time of his 1993 mayoral campaign, Menino took a position supporting an existing municipal executive order which allowed city employees sick leave or bereavement time in instances in which a domestic partner or other household member has taken ill or died. In 1998, Menino signed an executive order allowing domestic partners and dependents of gay, lesbian, and unmarried municipal employees to receive health benefits from the city. He was among the first mayors in the United States to extend such benefits to same-sex partners of municipal employees. Menino came out in support of same-sex marriage in 2003. At one point, Menino refused to partake in the South Boston St. Patrick's Day parade due to their exclusion of gays. In 2012, Menino headed the Mayors for Freedom to Marry effort. In 2012, Menino came out against having Chick-fil-A open restaurants in Boston, citing their opposition to same-sex marriage and what he called Boston's status as "a leader when it comes to social justice and opportunities for all." Menino would state that he knew there was little he could do as mayor to prevent the company from opening restaurants in the city, but maintained that they were not welcome in the city.

=== Urban development ===
During Menino's tenure, the city's total square footage of office and residential space increased by 11%, and 80 million square feet of development was constructed.

Menino often faced criticism accusing him of playing "favorites" with developers.

Between 2000 and 2010, Boston saw 20,500 new units of housing constructed, including 5,500 units of affordable housing. The influx of millions of dollars of new high-priced housing during Menino's tenure contributed to gentrification, which had the negative impact of pricing longtime residents out of neighborhoods. More than 12,000 new college dormitory rooms were constructed in Boston during Menino's tenure.

In 2010, legislation was passed creating a downtown business improvement district, something Menino had been pushing for since the 1990s.

Menino also known for focusing on neighborhood development in Boston, organizing services by neighborhood, and appointing neighborhood coordinators who serve as ambassadors from the city in their areas, believing that development should happen in every neighborhood. In 2001, Governing magazine named Mayor Menino Public "Official of the Year" for effective neighborhood development in Boston. This model has spread to other cities as a result of its effectiveness. Menino oversaw the development of the Seaport District in South Boston, also known as the "Innovation District". Menino also gave priority to the redevelopment of Dudley Square (today known as "Nubian Square"). Over his tenure, there was roughly $330 million of private development there.

Menino was involved with negotiating with Boston Red Sox ownership and the state of Massachusetts a deal to provide public funds to build a new baseball stadium near the existing Fenway Park. However, the Boston City Council rejected the deal, and the existing Fenway Park was instead renovated. After new ownership abandoned the idea of replacing Fenway Park, Menino supported their efforts to renovate the stadium, and also launched a review of the potential new development in the surrounding neighborhood. Following a 2004 rezoning effort of the neighborhood surrounding Fenway Park, the area began to see major new developments.

At the end of Menino's tenure, the city was undergoing a construction boom, with Moody's Investor Service having credited the city in 2012, having "the strongest commercial real estate market in the country since the 2008 recession".

=== Education ===
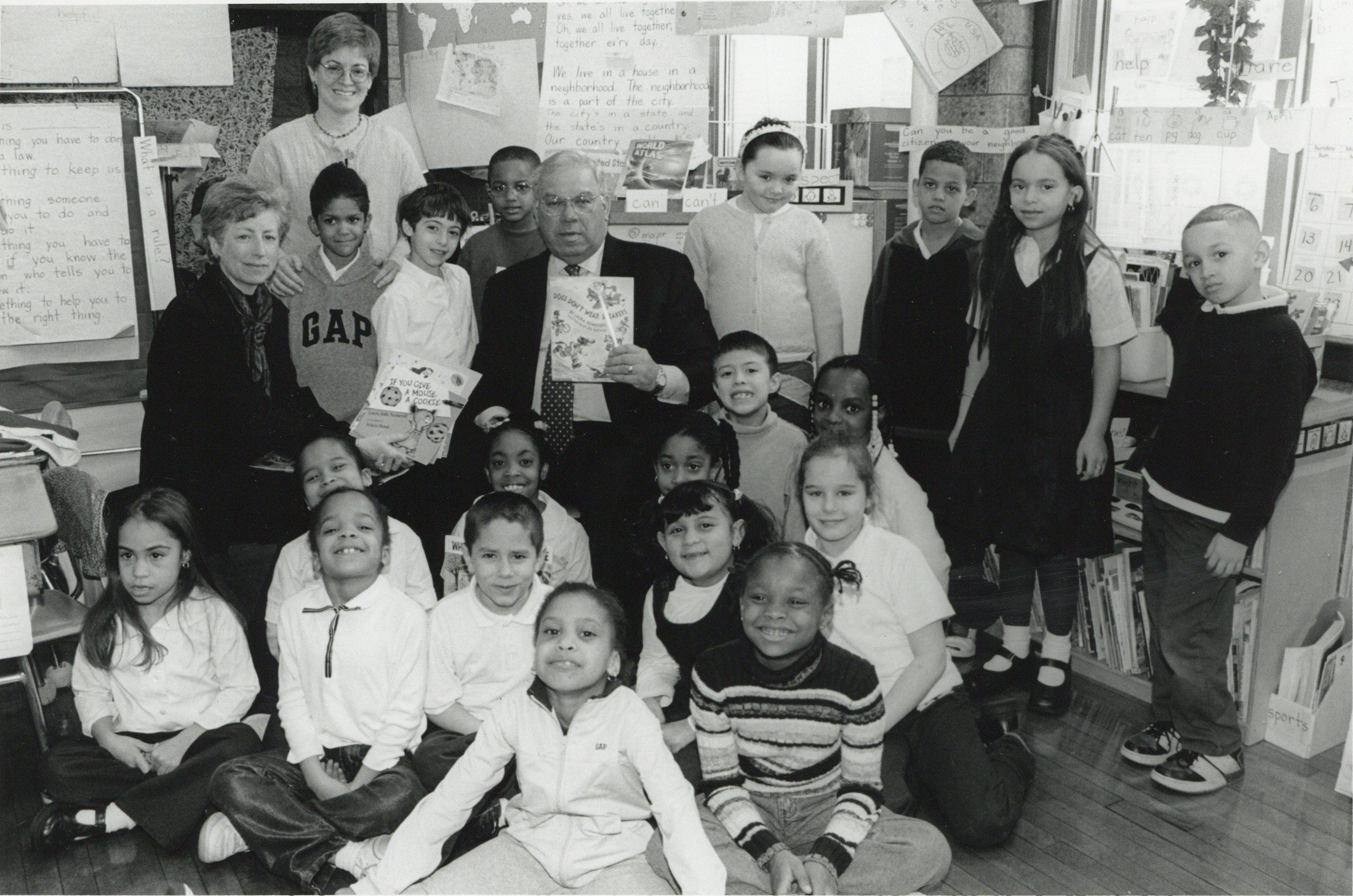
Menino with school children

Student performance in Boston Public Schools made improvements during Menino's tenure in regards to test scores. However, Menino was resistant to many school reforms, despite having promised to overhaul the schools.

Menino long opposed publicly funded tuition vouchers. In June 2009, Menino voiced support for performance pay in Boston public schools.

Menino failed in his effort to lengthen school days, meeting resistance from the Boston Teachers Union.

For years, Menino's position on charter schools was one of opposition. However, in 2009, Menino came out in support of charter schools, praising what he proclaimed to be charter schools' ability to attract quality teachers, arrange lessons to fit students' needs, and establish flexibile workplace rules.

=== Public safety and law enforcement ===
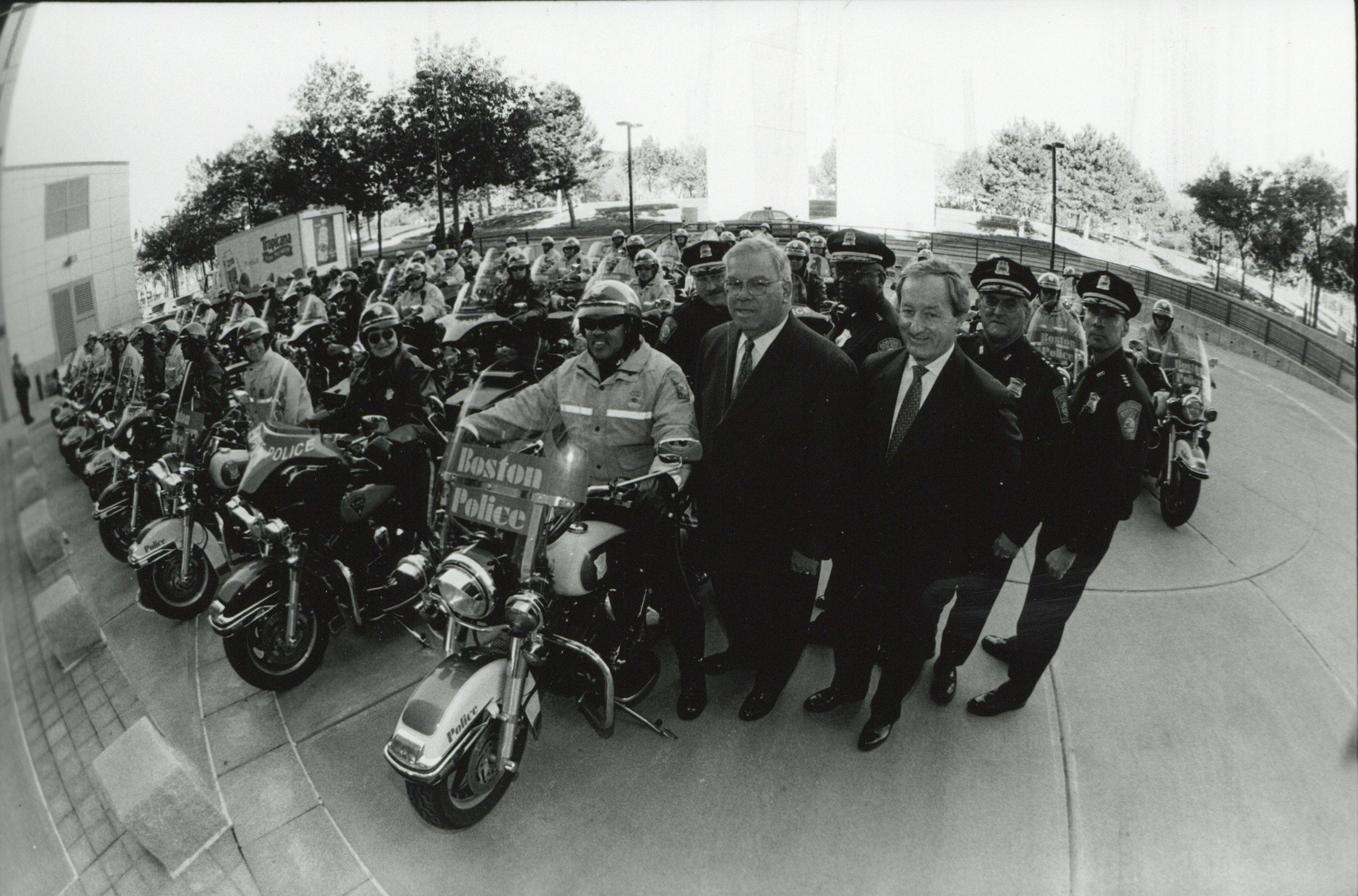
Menino with members of the Boston Police Department

During Menino's tenure, crime in Boston fell to record lows, and the city came to rank among the United States' safest large cities. Boston's violent crime rate fell from 1,957.7 in 1993, to 845.2 in 2011.

Menino took office amid the "Boston Miracle", a successful joint effort by police, churches, and neighborhood groups which worked to decrease youth-on-youth violence. At the start of his tenure, Boston was experiencing a 29-month long period in which no teenagers were murdered in the city. This ended on December 11, 1997, when a sixteen year old was murdered in Dorcester. Menino supported Operation Ceasefire, which is credited with decreasing homicide rate in the city. In 2003, the Operation Ceasefire program received the United States Department of Justice's "Outstanding Comprehensive Strategic Plan Award".

In his last year in office, the Boston Marathon bombing took place. Menino, who had been recovering in the hospital from a leg fracture at the time of the attacks (confining him to a wheelchair), checked out of the hospital in order to be present in the aftermath of the attacks.

=== Public health ===
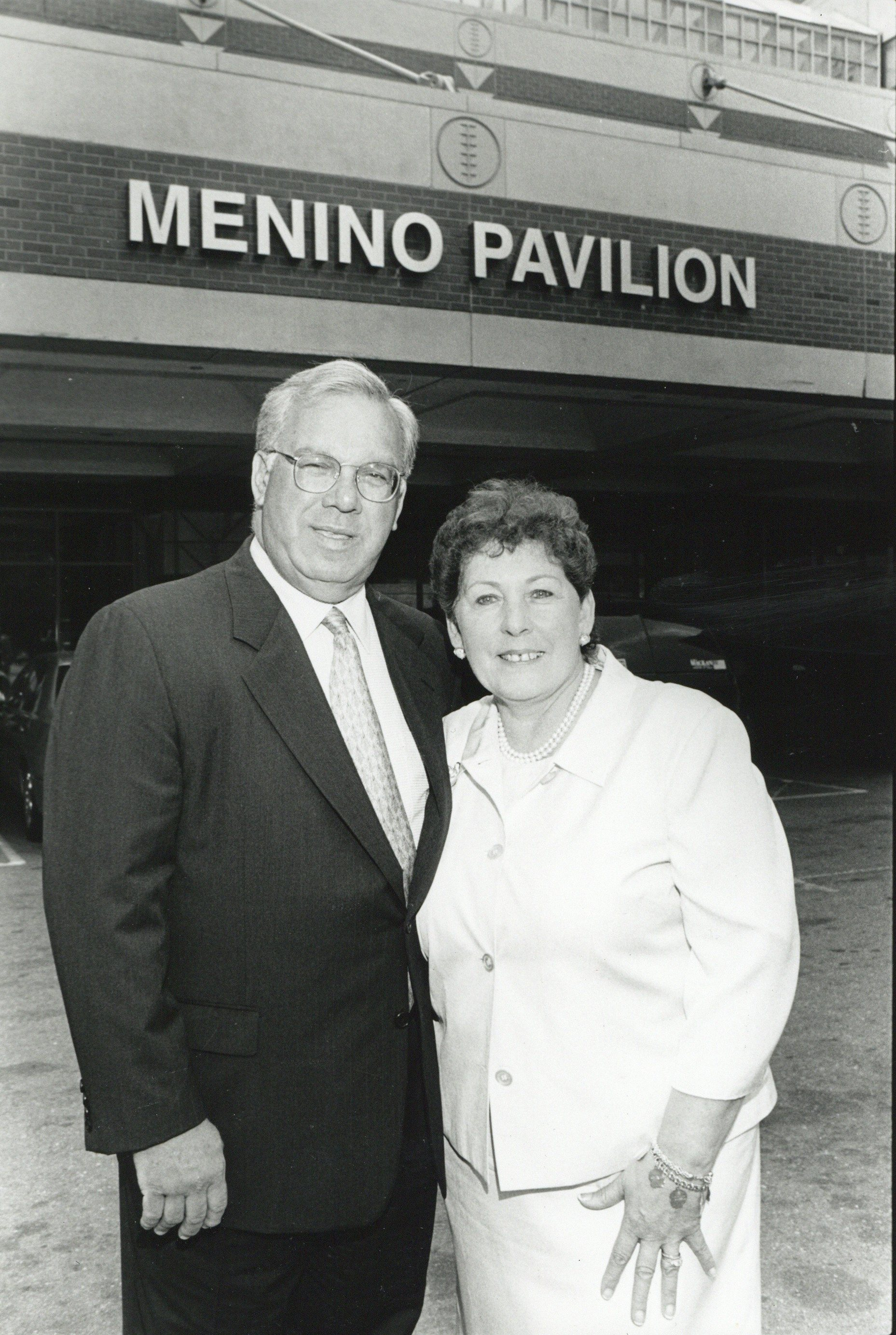
Menino and his wife, Angela, pose outside of the Menino Pavilion (named for him) at the Boston Medical Center in 2002

Menino oversaw negotiations that led to the January 1996 merger of the Boston City Hospital (which had been declining, and was in financial trouble) with the BU Medical Center. This merger had been arranged with the aim of improving healthcare for the city's more impoverished residents. This merger resulted in the establishment of the privatized Boston Medical Center. Menino had, as a city councilor, previously given support to the idea of reorganizing the Boston City Hospital. The Menino Pavilion at the Boston Medical Center would later be named for him, crediting his efforts on public health.

In the early 2000s, Menino was an early supporter of efforts to pass a statewide ban in Massachusetts on smoking in indoor workplaces. In 2012, Boston became Massachusetts' first large city, as well as the largest city in the United States, to ban smoking in public housing.

As he had during his tenure on the Boston City Council, Menino supported needle exchange programs as mayor.

In 2004, in an effort to fight childhood obesity, Menino banned sodas from Boston Public Schools. In April 2011, in a similar effort to fight obesity, Menino banned advertisements and sales of sugar-heavy drinks in municipal buildings and at city-sponsored events.

=== Environmental issues ===
In 2008, Boston was ranked as the third-greenest city in the United States by Popular Science. In the previous decade, there had been new initiatives around planting more trees in the city, single-stream recycling, increasing the solar power capacity of the city, investing in alternative energy, and biking. One of the most innovative ideas has been green building zoning, which requires large-scale private construction to be "green" by LEED standards. Boston is the first city to revise its building code to ensure green construction.

Menino was a founding members of the US Mayors' Alliance for Green Schools.

Under Menino, Boston became the first major city in the United States to incorporate green building standards in its zoning codes. Boston changed its zoning codes to require private construction larger than 50,000 square feet to adhere to the U.S. Green Building Council's LEED standards.

Under Menino, Boston partnered with other government agencies and local businesses to accomplish its goals of reducing greenhouse gas emissions by 7% below 1990 levels by 2012, and to 80% below 1990 levels by 2050.

Menino released an updated Climate Action Plan for the City of Boston on Earth Day 2011. The major goals of the climate plan included reducing community greenhouse emissions 25% by 2020 and 80% by 2050, including projected climate change into all formal planning and project review processes, encouraging community climate action and leadership, and creating green jobs.

=== Public image ===
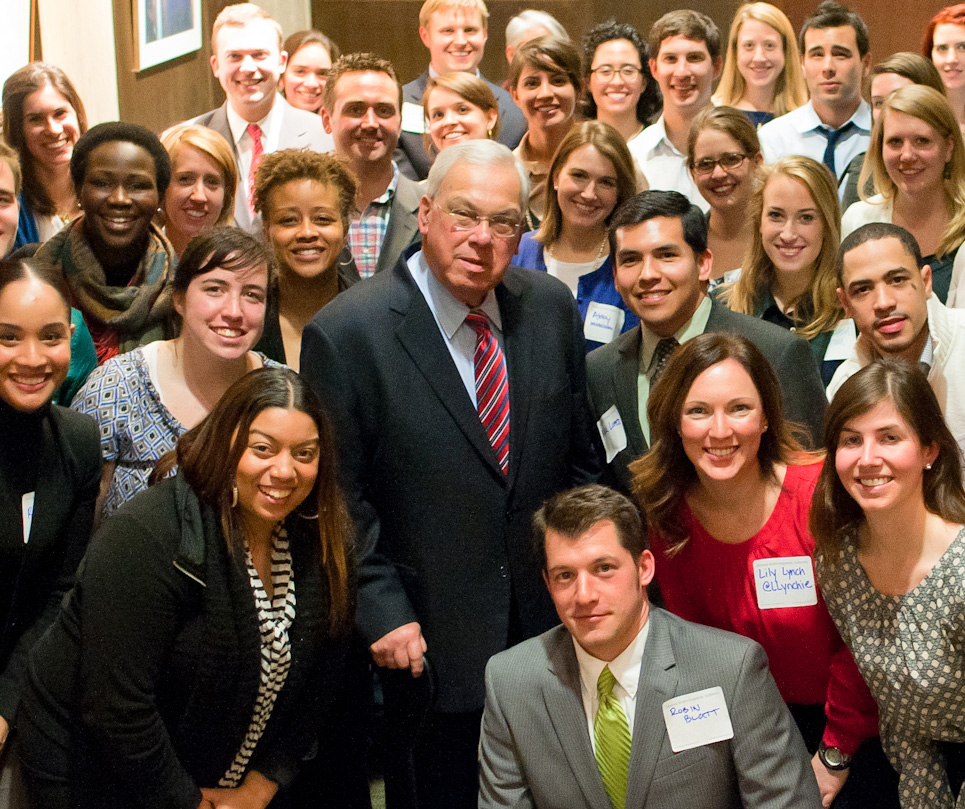
Menino in 2013

Menino enjoyed strong popularity. Menino's perennial popularity garnered him the tongue-in-cheek epithet "Mayor for Life." In July 2012, it was reported that Menino had an 82% approval rating.

Menino made appearances at community events, such as parades and community meetings. Surveys, such ones conducted in April 2008, in May 2009, and March 2013 for The Boston Globe by the University of New Hampshire Survey Center, showed that more than half of the city's residents had reported having at one point personally met Menino, an immense share of residents for a big city mayor.

Menino, who famously was dubbed, and even styled himself, as an "urban mechanic", had a reputation for focusing strongly on "nuts and bolts" issues. The "urban mechanic" nickname had both positive and negative connotations to it. He had been given this nickname in late 1994.

== Post-mayoralty ==
After leaving office as mayor in January 2014, Mayor Menino was appointed as Professor of the Practice in the Department of Political Science at Boston University; and he co-founded the Initiative on Cities (IOC), an urban leadership research center based at the university, alongside Professor of Political Science Graham Wilson. As a co-founder and co-director of the IOC, Mayor Menino helped develop the office's mission to bridge the gap between the academic study of cities and the real-world practice of urban governance. This was accomplished by hosting conferences, seminars, and a speaker series; by providing research funding to BU faculty and students; and by providing fellowship opportunities for students interested in local government.

Under Mayor Menino, the IOC also created its flagship research project, the recently rededicated Menino Survey of Mayors, the only nationally representative survey of American mayors. The Survey stands as an annual examination of the most pressing challenges and opportunities facing America's urban leaders.

== Speech errors ==
Mayor Menino was known for his distinctive voice, thick Boston accent, and speech errors, some of which are malapropisms. The examples here also include substitution; deletion; and addition, or epenthesis—which mean that, respectively, whole words are used in place of the intended word; portions of a word are eliminated; and portions of a word are added into the intended word. As a result of these various errors, some commentators (such as conservative radio show host and author Howie Carr) refer to the mayor as "Mumbles Menino" or "Mayor Mumbles." A typical example of one of his speech errors involves a reference to Boston's parking shortage as "an Alcatraz around my neck" (meaning, instead, an albatross around his neck), which is a substitution error.

An example of Menino causing controversy with his choice of words occurred in an interview for the August 28, 2013, issue of the New York Times Magazine. Menino was quoted as saying that he would blow up Detroit and start all over, in reference to the inaction of the city's leaders. In response, Detroit mayor (and one-time member of the Boston Celtics) Dave Bing questioned his choice of words: "I would think the mayor of a city that recently experienced a deadly bombing attack would be more sensitive and not use the phrase 'blow up.'" The comments came just over four months after the Boston Marathon bombing. Menino apologized on September 4.

== Personal life ==
Menino met Angela Faletra in 1963 when the two were playing tennis in Roslindale on adjacent courts. The two were married three years later and moved to Hyde Park, where they resided until his death. They had two children, Susan and Thomas Jr., and six grandchildren.

Menino was hospitalized several times while mayor. He was admitted for abdominal pain and intestinal inflammation and was treated for kidney stones in 1995 and 1997. In 2003, Menino underwent surgery at Brigham and Women's Hospital to remove a rare sarcoma (DFSP) on his back. The tumor had not spread, and the mayor was able to return to work several days later. In 2004, he was diagnosed with Crohn's disease, helping to explain his recurring intestinal problems. The condition required lifelong treatment with anti-inflammatory medication and careful monitoring of his diet.

=== Illness and death ===
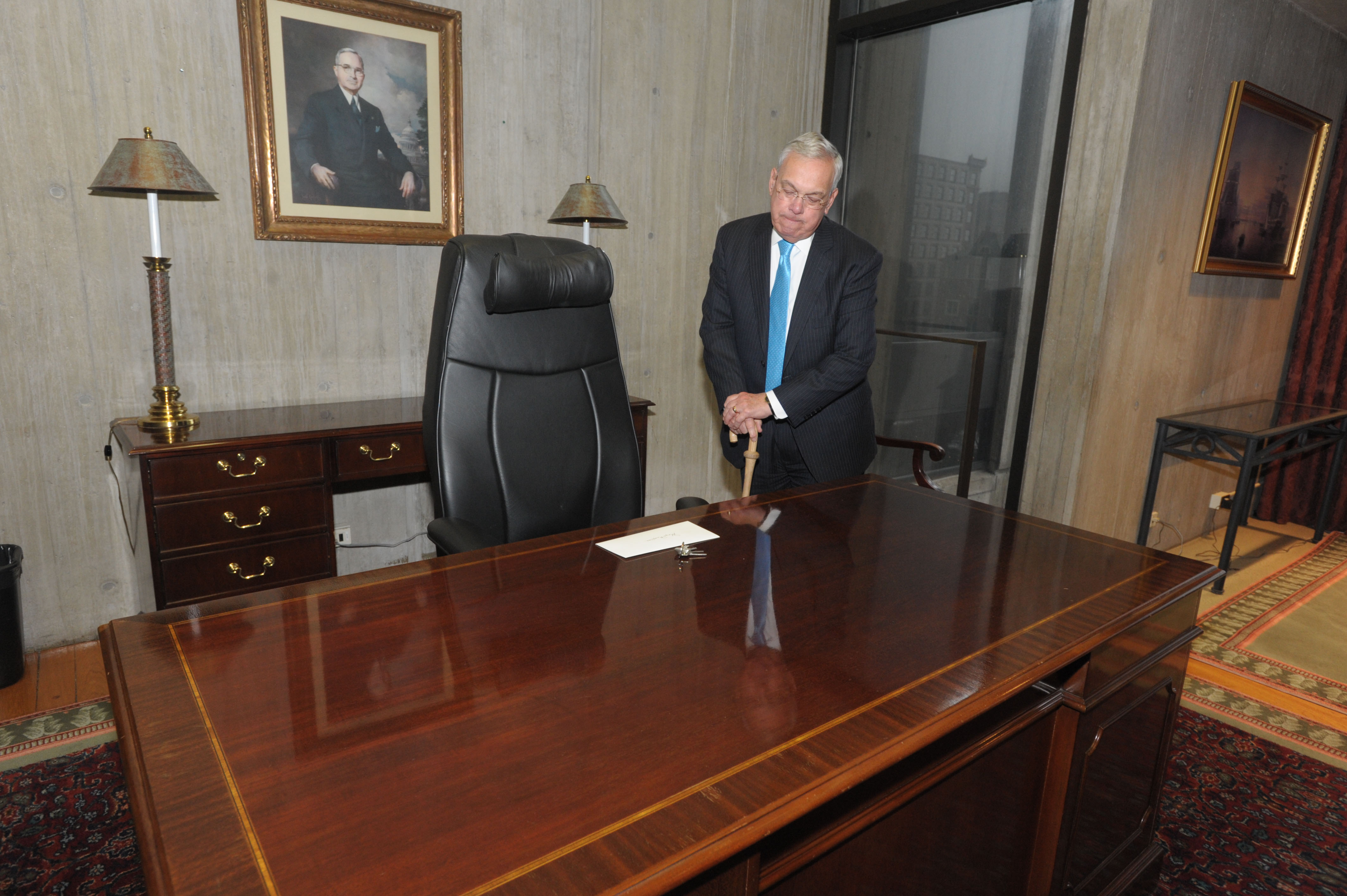
Menino on his last day in office, leaving a letter and keys for incoming mayor Marty Walsh

In March 2014, Menino announced that he had been diagnosed with an advanced form of cancer of unknown primary origin that had spread to his liver and lymph nodes and that he was beginning intensive chemotherapy treatment at Dana–Farber Cancer Institute in Boston. On October 23, 2014, he made the announcement that he would be halting cancer treatments, as well as his book tour, to spend more time with family. He died in Boston at the age of 71 one week later on October 30 at approximately 9 a.m. Eastern Standard Time. Menino was receiving hospice care at Brigham and Women's Hospital.

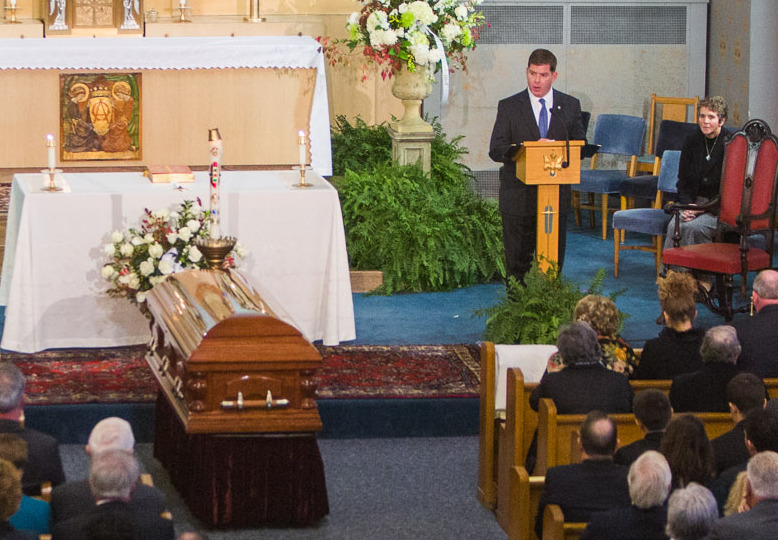
Menino's successor, Marty Walsh, speaking at Menino's funeral mass

Menino's body lay in state at Faneuil Hall in Boston on November 2, and his funeral was held at the Most Precious Blood Parish in Hyde Park the following day. The funeral services were pre-planned by Menino himself, including the list of invitees for the private funeral mass. His funeral services were presided over by Cardinal Seán Patrick O'Malley, the Archbishop of Boston; attendees included Menino's successor, Marty Walsh; Governor Deval Patrick; former Governor William Weld; Vice President (and later President) Joe Biden; former President Bill Clinton; Secretary of State and former U.S. Senator from Massachusetts John Kerry; House Minority Leader Nancy Pelosi; Boston Celtics legend Bill Russell; and David Ortiz and Pedro Martínez of the Boston Red Sox. He was buried at Fairview Cemetery in Hyde Park, around the corner from his home.

== Honors and legacy ==
In 2013, Harvard University awarded Menino an honorary degree.

Various facilities in Boston have been named after Menino, including:

- Mayor Thomas M. Menino Park, in Charlestown
- Menino Arts Center, in Hyde Park
- Menino Pavilion, at the Boston Medical Center
- Thomas M. Menino Community Center, in Roslindale
- Thomas M. Menino Fields at Millennium Park, in West Roxbury
- Thomas M. Menino Convention & Exhibition Center in South Boston

== Electoral history ==
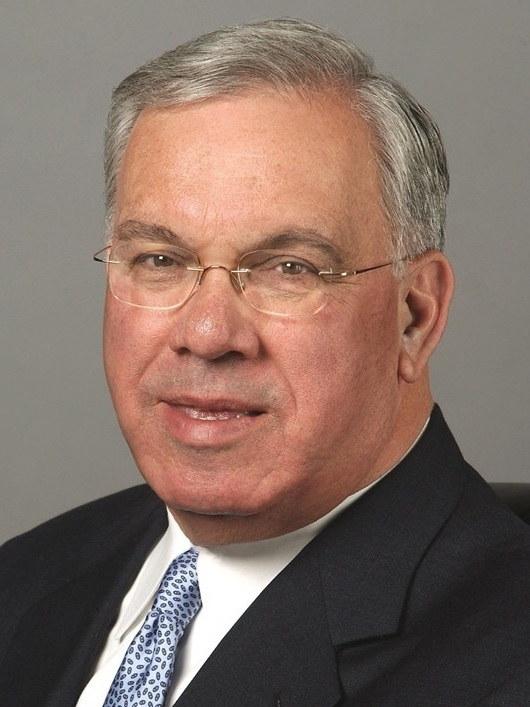
Menino's mayoral portrait, taken in 2004

=== City Council ===
1983 Boston City Council district 5 election
Candidates	Preliminary election		General election	
Candidates	Votes	%	Votes	%
Thomas Menino	11,375	57.8%	17,554	74.7%
Richard E. Kenney	3,126	15.9%	5945	25.3%
William G. Broderick	3123	15.9%		
Robert MacGregor	1124	5.7%		
Constance L. Brown	467	2.4%		
George L. Richmond	461	2.3%		

1985 Boston City Council district 5 election
Candidates	General election	
Candidates	Votes	%
Thomas Menino (incumbent)	5,745	100

1987 Boston City Council district 5 election
Candidates	General election	
Candidates	Votes	%
Thomas Menino (incumbent)	10,437	87.0%
Gerald Bagley	1,556	13.0%

1989 Boston City Council district 5 election
Candidates	General election	
Candidates	Votes	%
Thomas Menino (incumbent)		100

1991 Boston City Council district 5 election
Candidates	Preliminary election		General election	
Candidates	Votes	%	Votes	%
Thomas Menino (incumbent)	6,784	79.5%	9,678	81.6%
Peter D. Stone	913	10.7%	2181	18.4%
Edmund T. Burke	632	7.4%		
Gerald Bagley	203	2.4%		

=== Mayor ===
1993 Boston mayoral election
Candidates	Preliminary election		General election	
Candidates	Votes	%	Votes	%
Thomas Menino (acting incumbent)	30,060	26.89	74,448	64.45
James T. Brett	25,052	22.41	41,052	35.54
Robert Rufo	22,517	20.14		
Rosaria Salerno	19,605	17.54		
Bruce Bolling	6,564	5.87		
Christopher Lydon	3,630	3.25		
Francis Roache	3,362	3.01		
Diane Moriarty	991	0.89		

1997 Boston mayoral election
Candidates	General election	
Candidates	Votes	%
Thomas Menino (incumbent)		71
all others		29

2001 Boston mayoral election
Candidates	Preliminary election		General election	
Candidates	Votes	%	Votes	%
Thomas Menino (incumbent)	31,715	73.37	68,011	76.06
Peggy Davis-Mullen	9,958	23.04	21,393	23.93
Althea Garrison	1,552	3.59		

2005 Boston mayoral election
Candidates	General election	
Candidates	Votes	%
Thomas Menino (incumbent)	64,001	67.52
Maura Hennigan	30,468	32.14

2009 Boston mayoral election
Candidates	Preliminary election		General election	
Candidates	Votes	%	Votes	%
Tom Menino (incumbent)	41,026	50.52	63,123	57.27
Michael Flaherty	19,459	23.96	46,768	42.43
Sam Yoon	17,179	21.16		
Kevin McCrea	3,340	4.11		

== Published works ==
- Menino, Thomas; Beatty, Jack (2014). Mayor for a New America. Houghton Mifflin Harcourt. ISBN 978-0544302495.

== See also ==
- Timeline of Boston, 1990s–2010s

Political offices
Preceded by Raymond L. Flynn	Mayor of Boston, Massachusetts; July 12, 1993 – January 6, 2014	Succeeded by Marty Walsh
Preceded by Dapper O'Neil	President of the Boston City Council; 1993	Succeeded by James M. Kelly
