= Dallas Ducar =

American healthcare executive and nurse practitioner

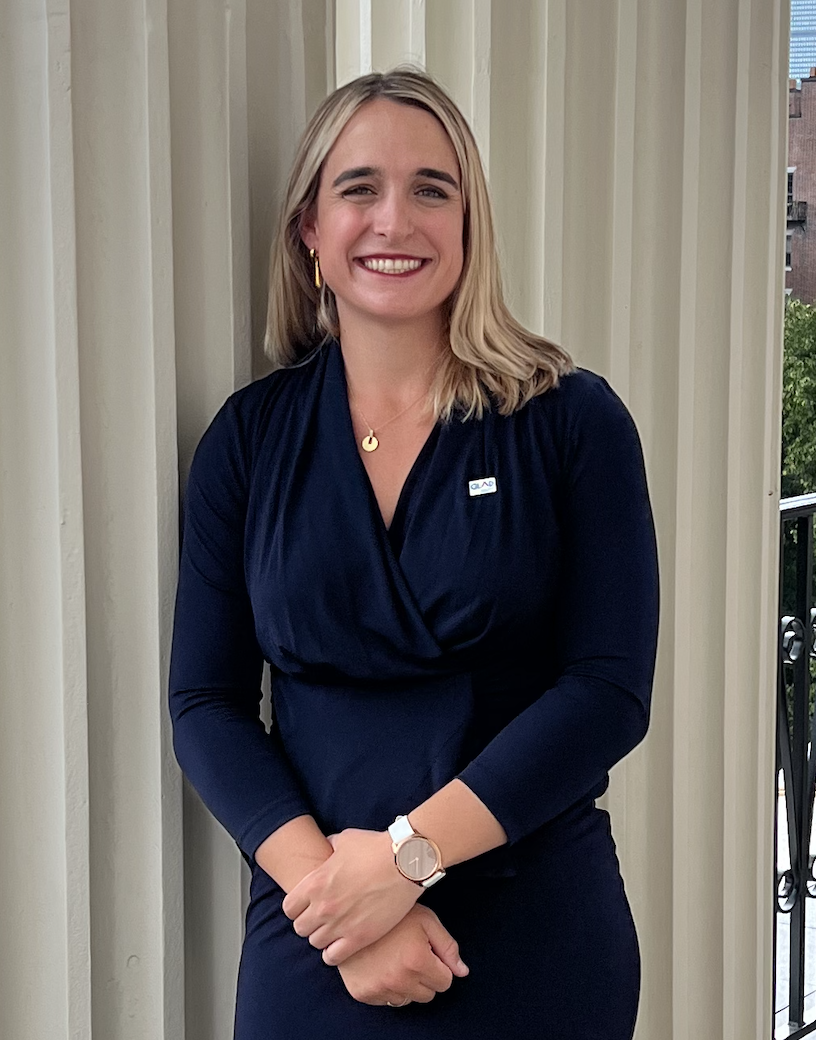
- Education: University of Virginia
- Occupations: Healthcare executive, nurse practitioner
- Employer: Fenway Health
- Known for: Founding Transhealth

Dallas Ducar is an American healthcare executive and nurse practitioner. She is the chief strategy officer at Fenway Health. She was previously the founding president and chief executive officer of Transhealth, which opened in 2021 and which MassLive described as the first "independent, comprehensive" transgender health center. She is a Fellow of the American Academy of Nursing. She is vice president of the board of GLAD Law and co-chair of the National LGBTQ+ Healthcare Alliance.

== Early life and education ==
Ducar is from Phoenix, Arizona. She studied at the University of Virginia, where she majored in philosophy and cognitive science with a focus on neuroscience, and minored in bioethics. She then earned a master's degree through the university's Clinical Nurse Leader program and completed further graduate study to become a psychiatric-mental health nurse practitioner. She volunteered on the Charlottesville-Albemarle Rescue Squad, and was an emergency nurse, psychiatric nurse, and psychiatric nurse practitioner. She also holds a certificate in Public Leadership from the Harvard John F. Kennedy School of Government.

== Career ==
Ducar founded Transhealth and led it as president and CEO until 2024. Transhealth opened in Northampton, Massachusetts, in May 2021 to provide clinical care, research, advocacy, and education related to gender-affirming healthcare. Under Ducar, Transhealth expanded its telehealth services and began seeing patients from other states, including Connecticut, New Hampshire, New York and Vermont. By August 2023, Transhealth provided primary care and mental health services to roughly 2,000 patients across New England, according to Healthcare Brew.

Ducar left Transhealth in 2024 and joined Fenway Health in Boston as executive vice president for donor engagement and external relations, overseeing policy, communications, and development. In 2026, she was promoted to chief strategy officer, responsible for the organization's long-term growth strategy and a new business development and project management office.

She has held faculty positions at the University of Virginia School of Nursing, Columbia University, and the MGH Institute of Health Professions. She previously worked at the UVA Medical Center and was clinical lead for mental health services in the Massachusetts General Hospital Transgender Health Program.

== Writing and media ==
Ducar's opinion writing has appeared in The Boston Globe, The Hill, Newsweek, Scientific American, and Stat, among other outlets. She has been covered by The New York Times, NBC News, Science Friday, the Thomson Reuters Foundation, and WBUR's Radio Boston.

== Civic and board service ==
Ducar is a member of the Massachusetts Democratic State Committee. Ducar is vice president of the board of directors of GLBTQ Legal Advocates and Defenders (GLAD Law), and serves on the boards of the Healing Our Community Collaborative (HOCC) and Mass NOW. She is co-chair of the National LGBTQ+ Healthcare Alliance. Ducar served on the Northampton Board of Health and on the health care and fair competition team of Attorney General-elect Andrea Campbell's 2022 transition. She contributed to the 2025 revision of the American Nurses Association's Code of Ethics for Nurses.

In 2024, MassLive profiled her among LGBTQ+ leaders in Massachusetts. Her recognition includes the Extraordinary Women Advancing Healthcare Award from The Women's Edge, the Ellen Paradise Fisher Award for Activism from Reproductive Equity Now, and the AACN Pioneering Spirit Award by the American Association of Critical-Care Nurses. In 2022, she was recognized as a Fellow of the American Academy of Nursing, received the Tim Porter-O'Grady Leadership Award from the American Nurses Foundation, and was honored in the Nurses Leading Innovation by Johnson & Johnson.
