= 1997 Boston mayoral election =

Election in Massachusetts, United States

- November 4, 1997
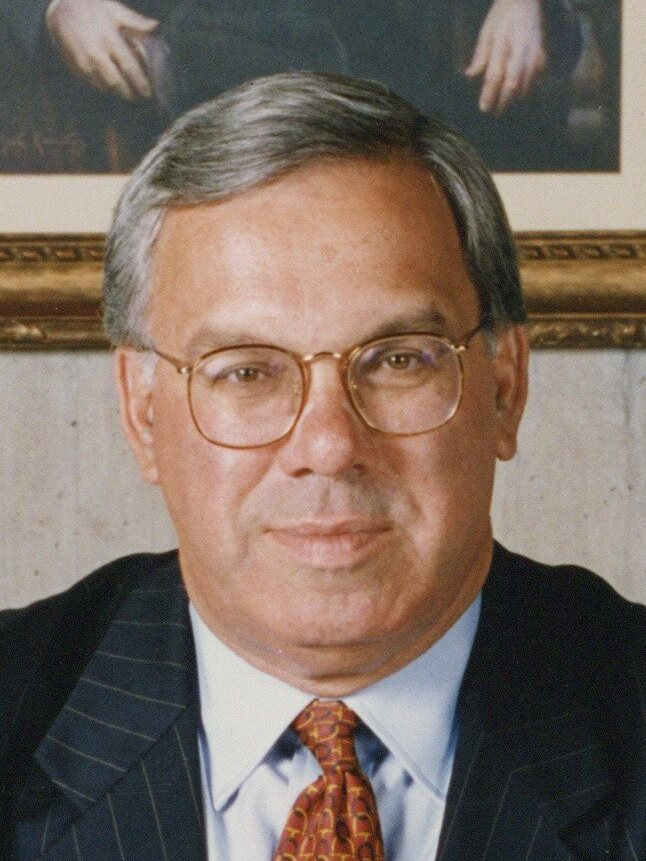
Candidate	Thomas Menino
Party	Nonpartisan
Popular vote	48,323
Percentage	71% unopposed
Mayor before election
Thomas Menino
Elected mayor
Thomas Menino

The Boston mayoral election of 1997 occurred on Tuesday, November 4, 1997. Incumbent Thomas Menino ran unopposed, and was re-elected to his second term; he received 71 percent of the vote. Menino only faced write-in opposition. This was the first time an incumbent mayor of Boston faced no opposition on the ballot in a general election since 1834.

Ahead of the election, four little-known individuals had declared their candidacy for mayor. None managed to collect the 3,000 valid signatures needed to qualify for the ballot, leaving Menino without an opponent on the ballot. Reasons dissuading more substantial opponents might have been the large campaign funding reserves Menino had and his great popularity, with a 1997 approval poll giving him a 74% approval rating.

== Candidates ==
- Thomas Menino, Mayor of Boston since July 12, 1993, Boston City Councilor from 1984 to 1993, and Council President in 1993.

== See also ==
- List of mayors of Boston, Massachusetts
