= Urban Geography (journal) =

- Discipline: Geography
- Language: English
- Edited by: Kevin Ward (geographer)

Publication details
- History: 1980-present
- Publisher: Taylor & Francis
- Frequency: 10/year
- Open access: Hybrid Open Access
- Impact factor: 3.1 (2025)

Standard abbreviations
- ISO 4: Urban Geogr.

Indexing
- ISSN: 0272-3638 (print); 1938-2847 (web)

Links
- Journal homepage

Urban Geography (ISSN 0272-3638) is a peer-reviewed academic journal that was first published in 1980. It appears ten times per year and covers topics concerning urban policy and planning, race, poverty, ethnicity in urban areas, housing, and provision of services and urban economic activity.

Urban Geography was published by Bellwether Publishing Ltd. until 2013, when it was acquired by Taylor & Francis Group. It is available online and in print. The Journal has an Impact Factor of 3.1 (2025) and CiteScore of 7.4 (2025).
