= David D'Alessandro =

American businessman

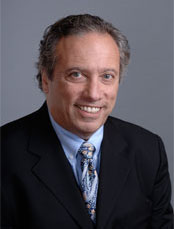
David D'Alessandro in 2012

David Francis D’Alessandro (born January 6, 1951) is an American businessman, marketing executive, and author. He was formerly chairman and CEO of John Hancock Financial Services, a Fortune 200 company. In 2025, D'Alessandro was named chairman for Servpro Industries, LLC, franchisor for more than 2,000 cleaning, restoration, and construction franchises across the U.S. and Canada.

== Early life and education ==
David D’Alessandro was born January 6, 1951, in East Utica, New York. D’Alessandro graduated from Utica College of Syracuse University in 1972 with a degree in journalism and public relations.

== Career ==
D'Alessandro worked for John Hancock from 1984 to 2004, hired initially as a marketing executive and later PR chief. He was named president and COO in 1998 and chairman and CEO in 2000. He oversaw the transition of the firm to a public company traded on the New York Stock Exchange. Under his leadership, John Hancock became a sponsor of the Boston Marathon, the New York City Marathon, and the Olympic Games. He led a merger between John Hancock and Manulife of Canada in 2004, after which he would become president and COO of Manulife. He retired shortly thereafter.

He is a former partner in the Boston Red Sox ownership group and was appointed by Major League Baseball to the Commissioner's Special Task Force on Baseball in the 21st Century.

D'Alessandro was chairman and CEO of SeaWorld Parks & Entertainment. He has commented publicly about ethics in business practices and is the author of three best-selling books about business: Brand Warfare, Career Warfare, and Executive Warfare.

He owns the restaurant Toscano, in Boston's Beacon Hill neighborhood and Harvard Square in Cambridge.

== Honors ==
- in 2001, he was named by Sporting News as one of the 100 "Most Powerful People in Sports"
- Ellis Island Medal of Honor (2009) from the National Ethnic Coalition of Organizers
