= James W. Hennigan Sr. =

American businessman and politician

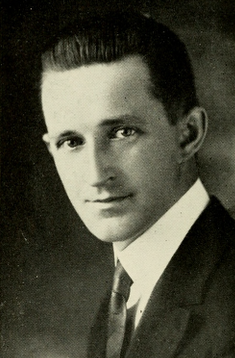
Photo of James William Hennigan

James William Hennigan Sr. (November 24, 1890 – September 30, 1969) was an American businessman and politician.

Hennigan was born in Boston, Massachusetts. Hennigan was involved in the insurance and real estate businesses. Hennigan served in the Massachusetts House of Representatives from 1931 to 1936 and in the Massachusetts Senate in 1937 and 1938. He was a Democrat. Hennigan also served the Massachusetts tax collector until 1960. He died at his home in Jamaica Plain, in Boston, Massachusetts. Hennigan's son was James W. Hennigan Jr. and his granddaughter was Maura Hennigan; they were also involved in politics.

== See also ==
- Massachusetts legislature: 1931–1932, 1933–1934, 1935–1936, 1937–1938
