= 2013 Boston mayoral election =

Election in Massachusetts, United States

- November 5, 2013
- Turnout: 37.85%▲
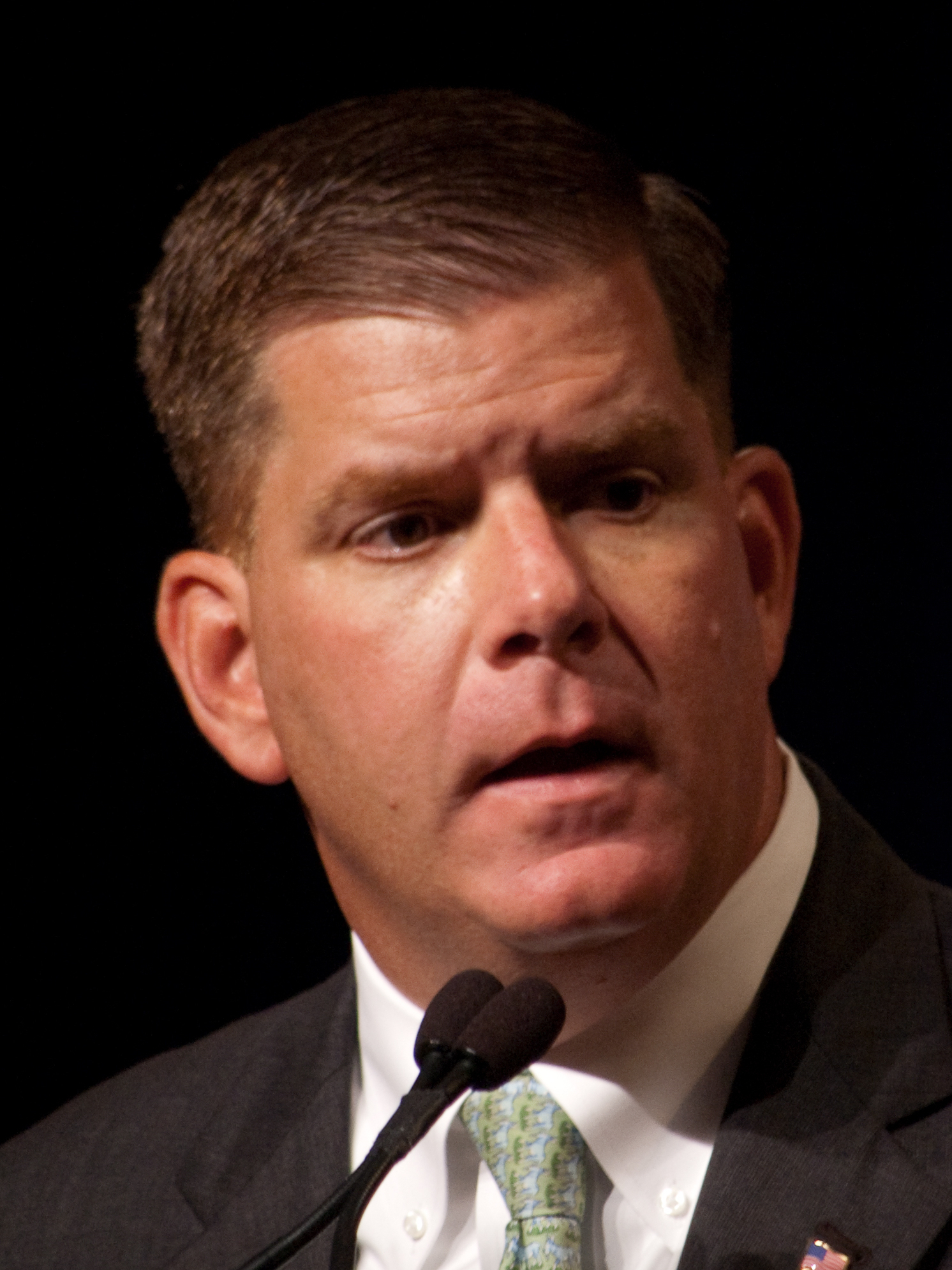

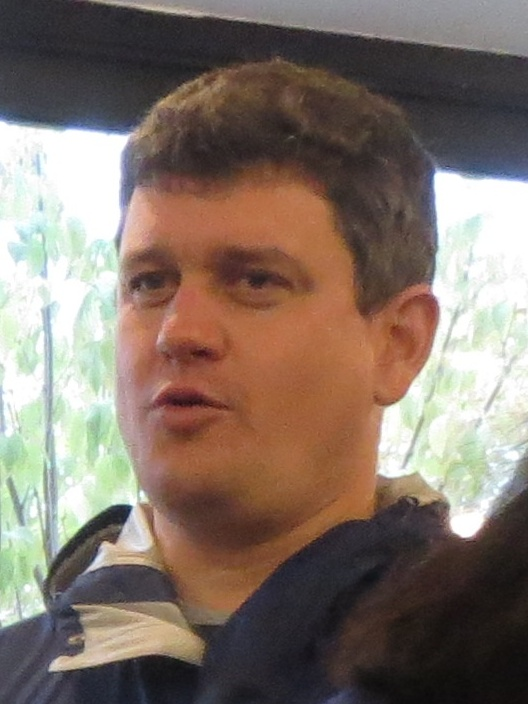
Candidate	Marty Walsh	John R. Connolly
Party	Nonpartisan	Nonpartisan
Popular vote	72,514	67,606
Percentage	51.55%	48.06%
- Walsh: 40–50% 50–60% 60–70% 70–80% 80–90% Connolly: 40–50% 50–60% 60–70% 70–80% 80–90% Tie: 40–50%
Mayor before election
Thomas Menino
Elected mayor
Marty Walsh

The 2013 Boston mayoral election occurred on Tuesday, November 5, 2013. Incumbent mayor Thomas Menino had declined to run for re-election to a sixth term. A non-partisan preliminary election was held on Tuesday, September 24, 2013. 12 candidates made the ballot to replace Menino, with state representative Marty Walsh and at-large city councilor John R. Connolly advancing to the general election. Walsh was elected to his first term, defeating Connolly by 3% of the vote, and was inaugurated on Monday, January 6, 2014.

Walsh and Connolly advanced to the general election after outperforming a crowded field in the nonpartisan primary. Other candidates in the primary included Charlotte Golar Richie (former state representative and former city chief of housing & neighborhood development), Daniel F. Conley (Suffolk County district attorney and former district city councilor), Felix G. Arroyo (at-large city councilor), John Barros (civic organizer and former Boston School Committee member), Robert Consalvo (state representative), Michael P. Ross (district city councilor), Bill Walczak (community activist), and Charles Yancey (district city councilor).

== Background ==
Incumbent mayor Thomas Menino had held office ever since ascending to the mayoralty following the resignation of Raymond Flynn in 1993. In 2013, Menino opted against seeking what would have been his sixth elected term as mayor. He announced his decision not to seek reelection on March 27, 2013.

Without an incumbent seeking reelection, this made the 2013 election the first open election since 1984, thirty years earlier. Menino did not endorse a candidate.

== Candidates ==
=== Candidates who advanced to general election ===
Candidate	Experience	Announced	Ref
The following candidates advanced to the general election held on November 5.			
John Connolly	Boston city councilor at-large (2008–2014)	February 26, 2013	
Marty Walsh	Massachusetts state representative from the 13th Suffolk district (1997–2014)	May 4, 2013	

=== Candidates eliminated in the primary ===
Candidate	Experience	Announced	Ref
The following candidates were eliminated in the primary election and did not advance to the general election.			
Felix G. Arroyo	Boston city councilor at-large (2010–2014)	June 15, 2013	
John Barros	Former Boston School Committee member (2010–2013); Former executive director of the Dudley Street Neighborhood Initiative	April 25, 2013	
Charles Clemons	Co-owner of TOUCH 106.1FM; Former police officer	August 21, 2011	
Daniel F. Conley	Suffolk County district attorney (2002–2018)	April 3, 2013	
Robert Consalvo	Boston city councilor from District 5 (2002–2014)	April 4, 2013	
Charlotte Golar Richie	Former Massachusetts state representative from the 5th Suffolk district (1995–1999)	May 1, 2013	
Michael P. Ross	Boston city councilor from District 8 (2000–2013); Former president of the Boston City Council (2009–2010)	April 11, 2013	
Bill Walczak	Co-founder of the Codman Square Health Center; Community organizer	April 6, 2013	
David James Wyatt	Candidate for Boston City Council in 2007		
Charles Yancey	Boston city councilor from District 4 (1984–2015)	July 1, 2013	

=== Withdrew/disqualified ===
- Frank John Addivinola, Jr., candidate for state senate in 2010 and U.S. House of Representatives in 2012 (ran for councilor-at-large)
- Lee Buckley
- Robert Cappucci, former Boston School Committee member and retired Boston Police officer (failed to get enough signatures)
- Miniard Culpepper, reverend
- Will Dorcena, activist and at-large candidate for city council in 2011, brother of State Senator Linda Dorcena Forry (failed to get enough signatures)
- Althea Garrison, former state representative (ran for councilor-at-large)
- John Laing, businessman (failed to get enough signatures)
- Divo Rodrigues Monteiro, educator and poet (ran for city council in District 4)
- Dave Portnoy, founder of Barstool Sports (failed to get enough signatures)
- Gareth R. Saunders, former city councilor (ran for councilor-at-large)
- Hassan A. Williams, candidate for state senate in 2010
- Christopher G. Womack

=== Declined ===
- Andrea Cabral, Massachusetts secretary of Public Safety and Security and former Suffolk County sheriff
- Sonia Chang-Díaz, state senator
- Richard A. Davey, Massachusetts secretary of Transportation
- John Fish, CEO of Suffolk Construction Company
- Michael F. Flaherty, former city councillor (ran for city council at-large)
- Paul Grogan, president of The Boston Foundation
- Maura Hennigan, Suffolk County criminal courts clerk
- Russell Holmes, state representative
- Tito Jackson, city councillor (ran for reelection)
- Bill Linehan, city councillor (ran for reelection)
- Stephen Lynch, U.S. representative
- Ralph Martin, former Suffolk County district attorney
- Thomas Menino, incumbent mayor of Boston
- Stephen J. Murphy, president of the Boston City Council (ran for reelection)
- Matt O'Malley, city councillor (ran for reelection)
- Ayanna Pressley, city councillor (ran for reelection)
- James Rooney, executive director of the Massachusetts Convention Center Authority
- Marie St. Fleur, former state representative
- John M. Tobin, Jr., former city councillor

== Primary ==
=== Campaign ===
Incumbent mayor Tom Menino had served since being elected to the position in 1993, making him the longest-serving mayor in Boston's history. The first candidate to announce a campaign for mayor was at-Large Boston City Councillor John R. Connolly in February 2013, who announced an intent to base his campaign on reforming public education and opposing the influence of the Boston Teachers Union. Connolly's campaign was considered to have little chance of succeeding if Menino decided to run for re-election, as the incumbent was highly popular in the city. On March 28, Menino announced that he would not be seeking re-election, stating that health issues were preventing him from carrying out his tasks as mayor to a satisfactory standard.

Soon after Menino's announcement, a field of candidates began to amass. On April 3, Suffolk County District Attorney Dan Conley became the second candidate to join the field (after Connolly). The next day, district city councillor Rob Consalvo (a resident of the Hyde Park neighborhood) announced his candidacy. On April 7, activist Bill Walczak (a resident of the Dorchester neighborhood) entered the field. On April 10, state representative Marty Walsh and at-large city councillor Felix G. Arroyo both announced their candidacies. Several other candidates, including City Councillors Michael P. Ross and Charles Yancey, former state representative Charlotte Golar Richie, and Boston School Committee member John Barros announced campaigns over the following weeks. In total, twelve candidates made the ballot for the preliminary election.

Connolly’s status as the only mayoral candidate to have announced a campaign before Menino declared that he would not run for re-election gave him an advantage in that it had given him more time to build a campaign apparatus and political platform.

Upon his entry into the race Walsh had demonstrated organizational strength by gathering the required signatures to get on the ballot in a single day, which impressed political insiders and showcased the influence of the labor unions who were supporting his candidacy. The advantages enjoyed by the two men led to them being considered the frontrunners for the two spots in the general election in the campaign's early stages.

By mid-September, it was suggested by radio station WBUR-FM that a clear top tier of candidates had arisen in the race, consisting of Connolly, Walsh, Golar Richie, Arroyo and Conley. Golar Richie's campaign was viewed as having gained significant momentum by this stage on the race, helped by her status as the most prominent black and only female candidate in the race.

=== Debates ===
2013 Boston mayoral election primary debates
No.	Date & time	Host	Moderator	Link	Participants											
Key: P Participant A Absent N Non-invitee																
Key: P Participant A Absent N Non-invitee					Felix G. Arroyo	John Barros	Charles Clemons	Daniel F. Conley	John R. Connolly	Robert Consalvo	Charlotte Golar Richie	Michael P. Ross	Bill Walczak	Marty Walsh	David Wyatt	Charles Yancey
1	August 7, 2013	Boston.com	Matt Lauzon; Dante Ramos		A	A	A	A	A	P	A	P	A	P	A	A
2	September 9, 2013		Joe Battenfield		P	P	P	P	P	P	P	P	P	P	P	P
3	September 12, 2013	BUSED	Dean Hardin Coleman; Alyssa Sarkis		P	P	P	P	P	A	A	A	A	A	A	P

=== Endorsements ===
Felix Arroyo

State officials

- Byron Rushing, state representative

Labor unions

- Boston Teachers Union (co-endorsement with Consalvo)
John Barros

State officials

- Carlos Henriquez, state representative

Newspapers and publications

- The Boston Globe (co-endorsement with Connolly)

Individuals

- Danny Glover, actor
- Kim Janey, community leader
Daniel F. Conley

State officials

- ~~Carlo Basile, state representative~~ (switched endorsement to Connolly)

Newspapers and publications

- Boston Herald (co-endorsement with Connolly)
John R. Connolly

State officials

- Carlo Basile, state representative (switched endorsement from Conley)
- Nick Collins, state representative
- Edward F. Coppinger, state representative
- Jay Livingstone, state representative

Local officials

- Matt O'Malley, Boston city councillor

Organizations

- Democrats for Education Reform

Newspapers and publications

- The Boston Globe (co-endorsement with Barros)
- Boston Herald (co-endorsement with Conley)
Rob Consalvo

State officials

- Kevin Honan, state representative
- Anthony Petruccelli, state senator
- Angelo Scaccia, state representative

Labor unions

- Boston Teachers Union (co-endorsement with Arroyo)
Charlotte Golar Richie

Federal officials

- Barbara Lee, U.S. representative from CA-13

State officials

- Sonia Chang-Díaz, state senator
- Gloria Fox, state representative
- Russell Holmes, state representative
- Aaron Michlewitz, state representative
- Michael Moran, state representative

Individuals

- Louis Gossett Jr., actor
- Gloria Steinem, journalist and activist

Organizations

- EMILY's List
Mike Ross

Newspapers and publications

- Bay Windows
Marty Walsh

State officials

- Liz Malia, state representative
- Eugene O'Flaherty, state representative

Labor unions

- International Association of Fire Fighters Local 718
- International Brotherhood of Teamsters
- International Union of Painters and Allied Trades
- United Association
- United Steelworkers

=== Polling ===
Graphical summary

View source data.

Poll source	Date(s) administered	Sample size	Margin of error	Felix Arroyo	John Barros	Daniel Conley	John Connolly	Robert Consalvo	Charlotte Golar Richie	Michael Ross	Bill Walczak	Marty Walsh	Charles Yancey	Other/ Undecided
Suffolk University/Boston Herald	September 12–17, 2013	600	± 4%	6%	3%	12%	16%	8%	10%	5%	6%	12%	1%	22% (Note: Clemons with 1%, Wyatt with 0%)
Mass Inc	September 14–16, 2013	487	± 4.4%	8%	3%	8%	15%	5%	10%	6%	4%	12%	1%	27% (Note: Clemons with <1%, Wyatt with <1%)
UNH	September 5–12, 2013	411	± 4.8%	6%	6%	10%	15%	6%	10%	5%	4%	10%	3%	27% (Note: Clemons with 2%, Wyatt with 0%)
Suffolk University/Boston Herald	July 10–15, 2013	600	± 4%	4%	1%	9%	12%	8%	5%	5%	2%	11%	3%	40% (Note: Clemons with 1%, Wyatt with 1%)

=== Results ===
2013 Boston mayoral election
Primary election
Party	Candidate	Votes	%
Nonpartisan	Marty Walsh	20,854	18.47
Nonpartisan	John R. Connolly	19,435	17.21
Nonpartisan	Charlotte Golar Richie	15,546	13.77
Nonpartisan	Daniel F. Conley	12,775	11.32
Nonpartisan	Felix Arroyo	9,895	8.76
Nonpartisan	John Barros	9,148	8.10
Nonpartisan	Robert Consalvo	8,603	7.62
Nonpartisan	Michael Ross	8,164	7.23
Nonpartisan	Bill Walczak	3,825	3.39
Nonpartisan	Charles Yancey	2,389	2.12
Nonpartisan	Charles Clemons	1,800	1.59
Nonpartisan	David Wyatt	334	0.30
Write-in		130	0.12
Total votes		112,898	100

== General election ==
=== Campaign ===
Both Connolly and Walsh were regarded as liberal Democrats, with Connolly being perceived as being focused on education and Walsh having the reputation of being the candidate of organised labor. Connolly was considered the frontrunner as the campaign began, as he was more well-known and was considered to have a superior field organisation to Walsh. However, Walsh's campaign was boosted by large spending by labor unions, who were dissatisfied with Connolly due to his staunch support for charter schools. Connolly raised objections to the support that Walsh had received, arguing that it would make him beholden to the unions if he were to win, but he made sure to temper his criticism to avoid alienating labor unions from his campaign completely. Walsh responded to this criticism by arguing that his ties to labor would make him more effective at negotiating contracts and preventing strikes. Walsh's campaign was also boosted by endorsements from his preliminary rivals Golar Richie, Barros and Arroyo.

The relative lack of policy differences between the candidates led to the election largely coming down to a contest between biographies and personalities. Walsh supporters derided Connolly as a "corporate lawyer" while Connolly supporters characterised Walsh as a puppet of organized labor. Connolly's base of support largely came from his home neighborhood of West Roxbury and the relatively affluent communities in Boston's west, while Walsh had support from both the more working-class, culturally conservative areas in South Boston and from left-wing activists who had been invigorated by Elizabeth Warren's successful campaign for U.S. Senate the previous year.

=== Debates ===
2013 Boston mayoral general election debates
No.	Date & time	Host	Moderator	Link	Participants	
Key: P Participant A Absent N Non-invitee						
Key: P Participant A Absent N Non-invitee					John R. Connolly	Marty Walsh
1	October 15, 2013	The Boston Globe; WBZ-TV	Jon Keller; Akilah Johnson		**P**	**P**
2	October 23, 2013	WGBH-TV	Margery Eagan; Jim Braude		**P**	**P**

=== Endorsements ===
Endorsements in bold endorsed after the primary.

John R. Connolly

State officials

- Carlo Basile, state representative
- Nick Collins, state representative
- Edward F. Coppinger, state representative
- **Sal DiDomenico**, state representative
- Jay Livingstone, state representative
- **Aaron Michlewitz**, state representative

Local officials

- **Mark Ciommo**, Boston city councillor
- **Salvatore LaMattina**, Boston city councillor
- Matt O'Malley, Boston city councillor

Individuals

- **Ernie Boch Jr.**, business executive (Republican)
- **Jim Rappaport**, former chair of the Massachusetts Republican Party (Republican)

Organizations

- Democrats for Education Reform

Newspapers and publications

- **BostInno**
- The Boston Globe
- Boston Herald
- **The Daily Free Press**
Marty Walsh

Federal officials

- **Mike Capuano**, U.S. representative from MA-07

State officials

- **Linda Dorcena Forry**, former state representative
- **Mel King**, former state representative; candidate for mayor in 1983
- Liz Malia, state representative
- **Therese Murray**, state senator and president of the Massachusetts Senate
- Eugene O'Flaherty, state representative
- **Anthony Petruccelli**, state senator
- **Charlotte Golar Richie**, former state representative; former candidate for mayor
- **Marie St. Fleur**, former state representative

Local officials

- **Felix D. Arroyo**, former Boston city councillor
- **Felix G. Arroyo**, Boston city councillor; former candidate for mayor
- **John Barros**, former Boston School Committee member; former candidate for mayor
- **Tito Jackson**, Boston city councillor

Labor unions

- International Association of Fire Fighters Local 718
- International Brotherhood of Teamsters
- International Union of Painters and Allied Trades
- **Service Employees International Union Local 888**
- United Association
- United Steelworkers

=== Polling ===
Graphical summary

View source data.

Poll source	Date(s) administered	Sample size	Margin of error	Marty Walsh	John Connolly	Undecided
Suffolk University/Boston Herald	October 29–31, 2013	555	± 4.2%	**46%**	43%	11%
UMass Poll, UMass Amherst	October 22–26, 2013	405	± 5.9%	**47%**	40%	13%
University of New Hampshire	October 17–22, 2013	465	± 4.5%	38%	**47%**	15%
Mass Inc	October 19–20, 2013	503	± 4.4%	39%	**41%**	20%
Sage Systems	October 16–17, 2013	375	± 3.9%	36%	**40%**	24%
UMass Lowell	October 2–7, 2013	375	± 6%	37%	**45%**	18%
S.U./Herald	October 2–6, 2013	600	± 4%	34%	**41%**	23%
Anderson Robbins ^	September 28–30, 2013	800	± ?	32%	**44%**	24%
S.U./Herald	September 12–17, 2013	600	± 4%	29%	**44%**	28%

- ^ Internal poll for John Connolly campaign
Hypothetical polling

With Conley

Poll source	Date(s) administered	Sample size	Margin of error	Daniel Conley	John Connolly	Undecided
S.U./Herald	September 12–17, 2013	600	± 4%	29%	**36%**	35%

With Consalvo

Poll source	Date(s) administered	Sample size	Margin of error	John Connolly	Robert Consalvo	Undecided
S.U./Herald	September 12–17, 2013	600	± 4%	**47%**	25%	28%

With Golar Richie

Poll source	Date(s) administered	Sample size	Margin of error	John Connolly	Charlotte Golar Richie	Undecided
Suffolk University/Boston Herald	September 12–17, 2013	600	± 4%	**43%**	32%	25%

=== Results ===
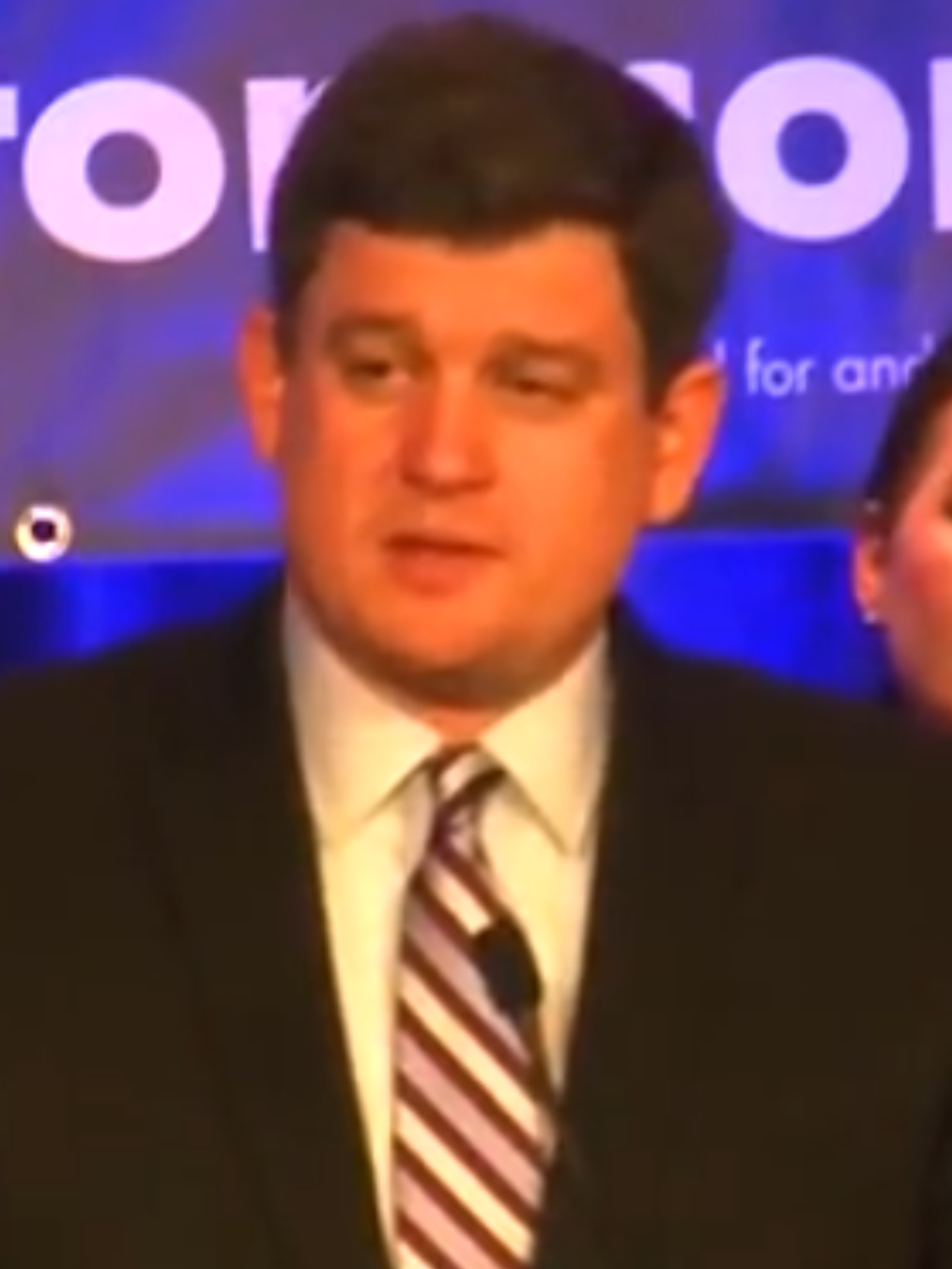
John Connolly delivering his concession speech after the November election

Walsh defeated Connolly by a narrow margin of 3.5%, with Connolly conceding and stating he believed Walsh would be a successful mayor. There were a total of 560 write-in votes, the largest recipient of these being baseball player David Ortiz.

2013 Boston mayoral general election
Party	Candidate	Votes	%
**Nonpartisan**	**Marty Walsh**	**72,583**	**51.54**
Nonpartisan	John R. Connolly	67,694	48.07
Write-in		560	0.40
Total votes		**140,837**	**100%**

== See also ==
- List of mayors of Boston, Massachusetts
