= Charles Yancey =

Member of the Boston City Council

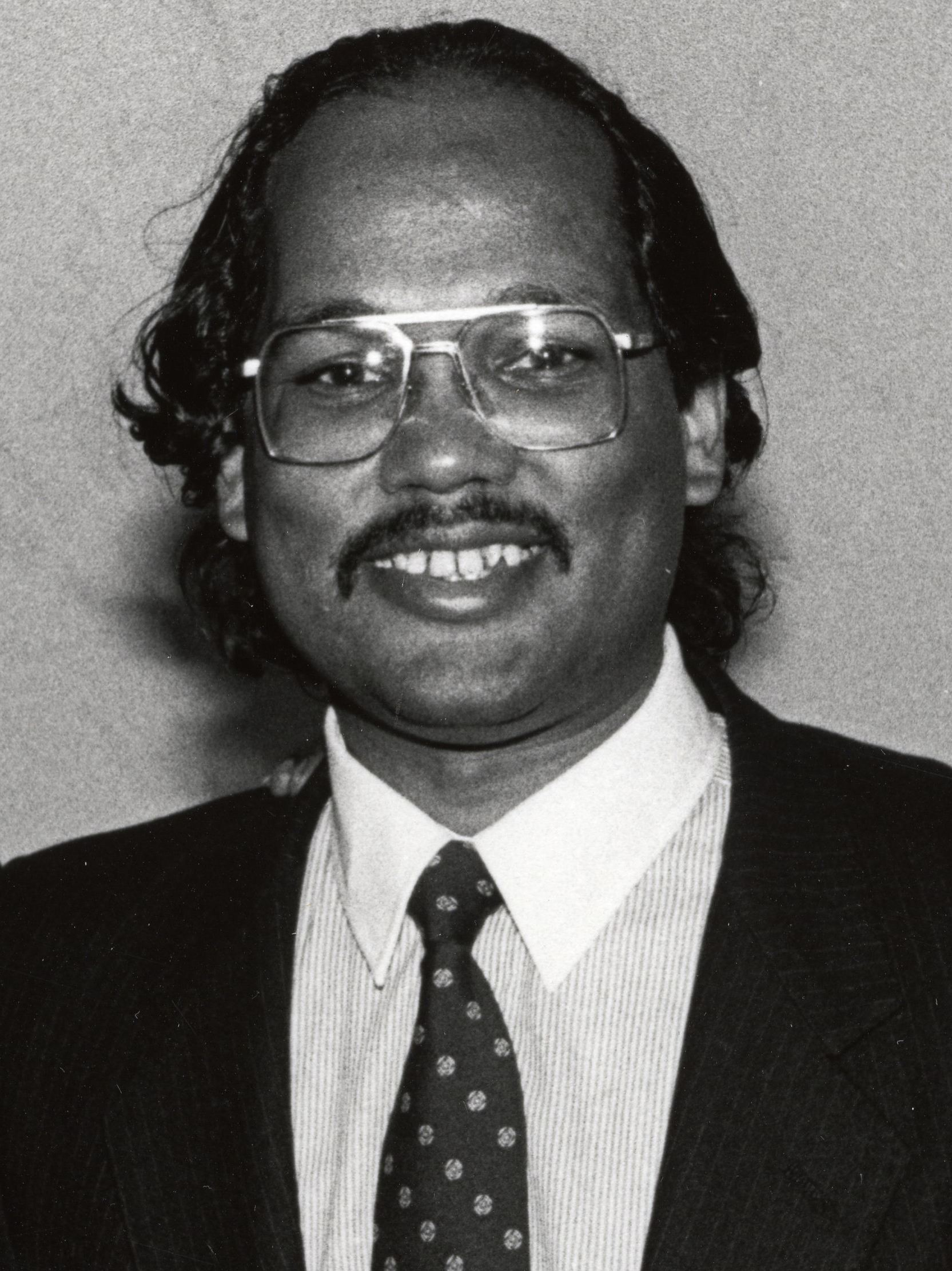
- Yancey, in the 1980s

President of the Boston City Council
- In office January 2001 – December 2001
- Preceded by: James M. Kelly
- Succeeded by: Michael F. Flaherty

Member of the Boston City Council from District 4
- In office 1984–2015
- Preceded by: District created
- Succeeded by: Andrea Campbell

Personal details
- Born: December 28, 1948 (age 77) Boston, Massachusetts, United States
- Party: Democratic
- Education: Tufts University (BEc); Harvard University (MPA)

Charles Calvin Yancey (born December 28, 1948) is a former member of the Boston City Council. Yancey served sixteen consecutive two-year terms, with a service totaling 32 years. He represented areas of Mattapan and Dorchester as the district councilor from the 4th district. He was City Council President in 2001, and unsuccessfully ran for mayor in 2013. His council tenure ended after he lost re-election in 2015 to Andrea Campbell.

Yancey was a frequent dissenter on the council, often casting lone votes in opposition to measures. He was a frequent, and often lone, voice of council opposition to the city's mayors; being the council's chief critic of all three mayors that his council service overlapped with: Raymond Flynn, Thomas Menino, and Marty Walsh. Yancey was a chief proponent of Boston's disinvestment from South Africa (in opposition to apartheid). A pet issue Yancey long advocated unsuccessfully for was a proposal to establish a new high school in Mattapan.

While on the council, Yancey several times ran unsuccessfully for higher office. He lost campaigns for United States House of Representatives in 1992 and 1998; state auditor in 1986; lieutenant governor in 1994; and mayor in 2013.

== Early life, family, education, and early career ==
Yancey was born at Massachusetts Memorial Hospital in Boston on December 28, 1948, to Howell Yancey Sr. and Alice W. Yancey. He was one of nine children in his family. He grew up in the Roxbury neighborhood of Boston and was educated in the Boston Public School System.

Yancey's mother, Alice (who died in 1996), worked a nurse. She was an active member of the Campbell and Jeremiah Burke home and school associations. In the 1960s, she was an active participant in the civil rights movement's efforts to integrate the student bodies of Boston Public Schools. She frequently held heated discussions with the Boston School Committee to advocate on the issue. After the assassination of Martin Luther King Jr. (whom she had personally met with many times), she led a successful petition drive to have the Campbell Junior High School renamed in honor of King. She was the founding president of the Women's Improvement League, and also worked as the director of Action for Boston Community Development, Roxbury Multi-Service Center, and Massachusetts Eye and Ear Infirmery.

Yancey attended the Philip Brooks Elementary School, the Patrick T. Campbell Junior High School, and Boston Technical High School. He was the first among his nine siblings to attend college. He received his Bachelor's degree in Economics from Tufts University in 1970, and later earned a Master's degree in Public Administration from Harvard University in 1991. While at Tufts, he helped found the Afro-American Society and the African American Cultural Center. Yancey moved to the Dorchester neighborhood of Boston in 1975.

In 1978 and 1979, Yancey served as director of administration for the Massachusetts Office of Communities and Development. He would years later recount that this role gave him fiscal control over $260 million. Before being elected to the council, he also served as the head of the Black Political Task Force organization in Boston. His early work also included serving as director of economic development for Circle Venture Capital Fund Inc., which built an office building in the Dudley Square neighborhood of Boston and a 41 acres (170,000 m^{2}) industrial park in Durham, North Carolina.

== Boston City Council (1984–2013) ==
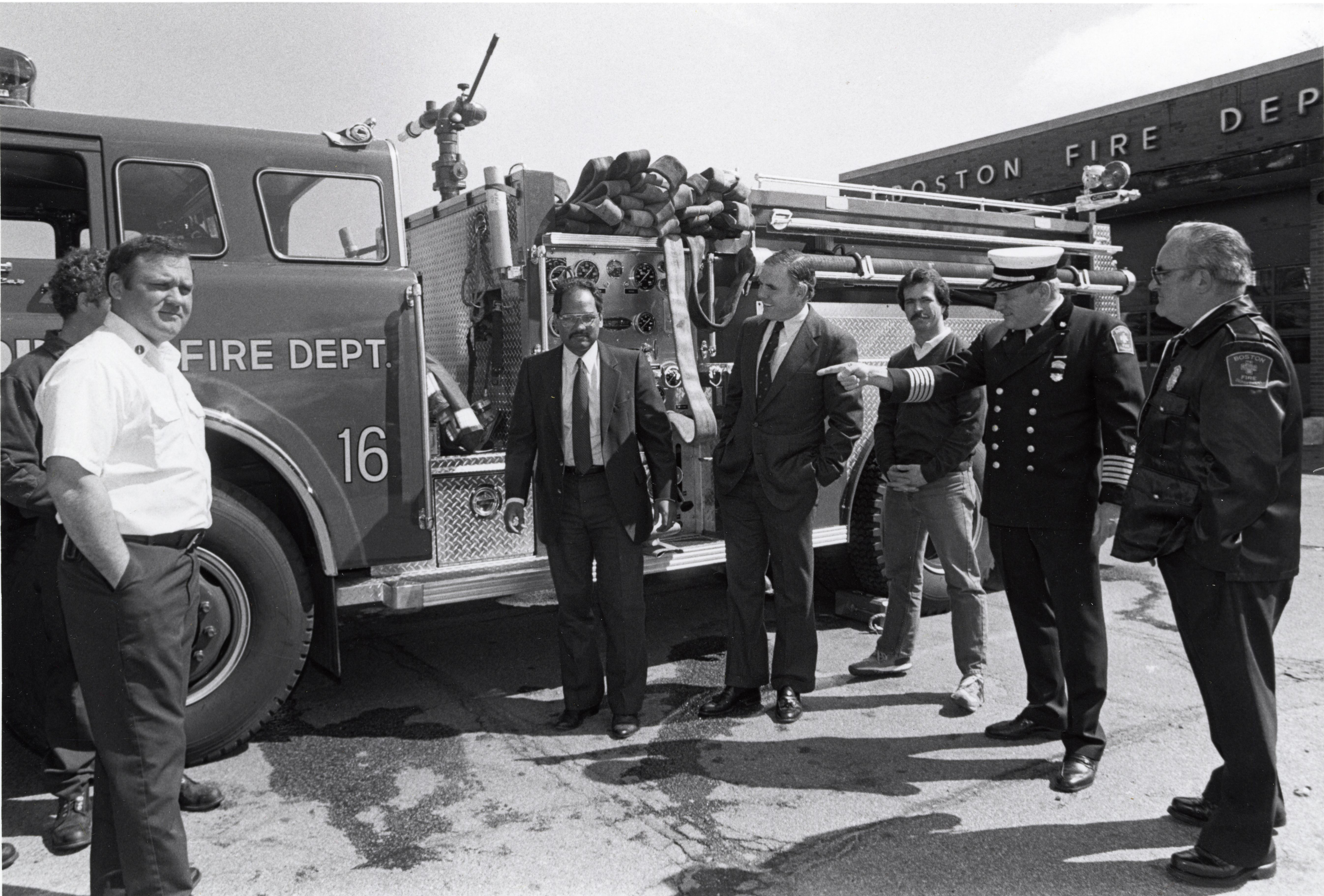
Yancey and Mayor Raymond Flynn at an event with Boston Fire Department officials, circa 1984–87

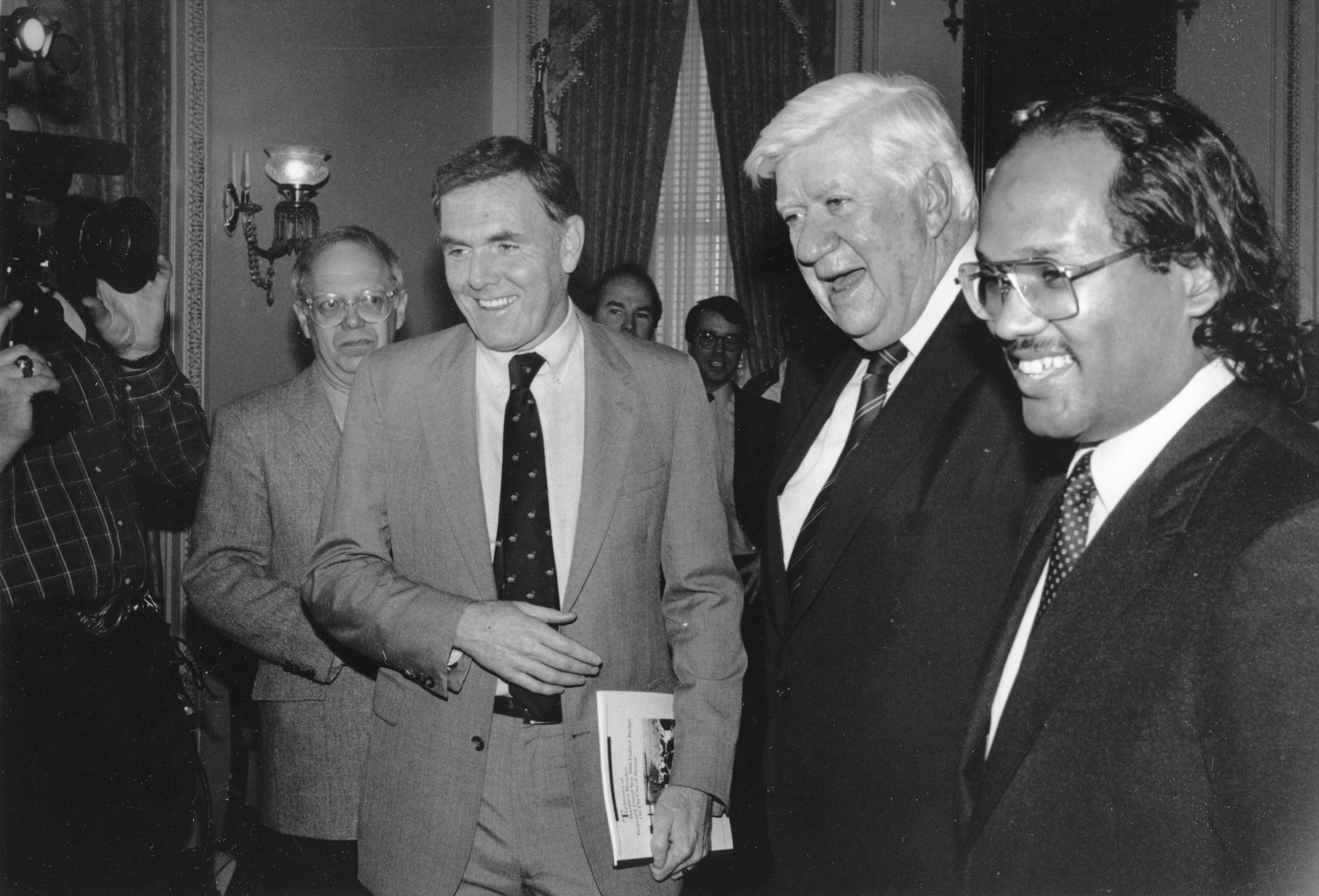
Yancey (far right) with Tip O'Neill (U.S. House Speaker) Mayor Flynn (third from right), circa 1984–87

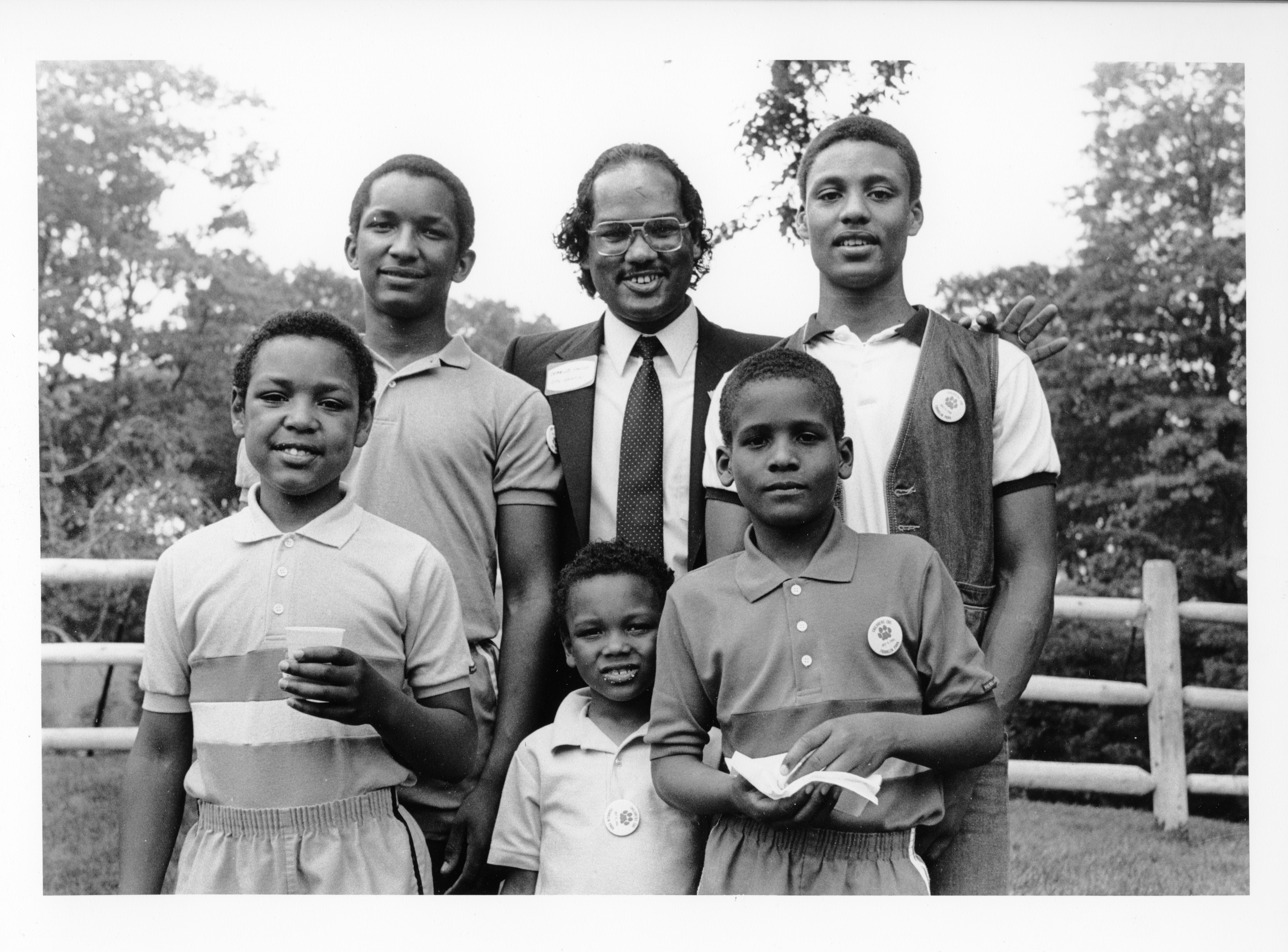
Yancey poses with a group of Boston youth at Franklin Park, circa 1984–87

Yancey unsuccessfully ran for the Boston City Council in both 1979 and 1981. In November 1983, Yancey prevailed in his third campaign for the council, being elected to the 4th district seat. Yancey was re-elected fifteen times, serving sixteen consecutive two year terms. His final re-election was in November 2013.

When Yancey first joined the council, the boundaries of the 4th district were situated primarily in Mattapan, and parts of Dorchester. In his later terms the district primarily represented areas of Dorchester.

Yancey served as a frequent lone dissenting vote, regularly being the sole councilor to vote in a given direction. This tendency led to him finding few strong allies on the council, and even being disliked by many of his fellow councilors. By the 1990s, council observers believed that his frequent dissents had caused several colleagues to, in turn, reflexively oppose proposals Yancey had introduced due to the mere aspect of his involvement. A 1992 profile by Don Aucoin published in the The Boston Globe described Yancey as the "resident council contrarian". A 2013 profile by Akilah Johnson published in the same newspaper described Yancey as frequently going "against the grain" in his political career,

He prides himself on being an agitator who can, at times, prove vexing in his fight to end disparities in city services – facilities, hiring, education, public safety – between the communities of color he represents and the rest of Boston.

Yancey and his admirers, however, touted his political independence as a virtue. Yancey himself argued that while his agitative approach may have earned him foes on the council, it also applied pressure to produce change. In a 1992 interview, Yancey remarked "everyone knows by now I'm not a rubber stamp councilor, but I don't consider myself a Lone Ranger." Yancey's district's constituents were predominantly black, and often felt disconnected from city government. Some council observers praised Yancey's work on behalf of his constituents and his individualism, while others argued that his isolation from other councilors made him a less effective advocate for the interests of his constituents.

Yancey was described to be a liberal and progressive member of the council. Other councilors who were described as having somewhat similar ideological leanings during Yancey's earlier terms in the 1980s and 1990s included Rosaria Salerno and David Scondras. Other councilors who were described as having somewhat similar ideological leanings during his later terms in the 2000s and 2010s included Ayanna Pressley, Michelle Wu, Tito Jackson, Matt O'Malley, and Josh Zakim.

Yancey was the council's sharpest critic of Raymond Flynn during the years of Flynn's mayoralty (1984–1993). He took pride in being Flynn's chief critic on the council, and noted that before being elected mayor himself, Flynn had incidentally been the council's loudest critic of Kevin White (Flynn's mayoral predecessor). During the later the mayoralty of Thomas Menino (1993–2014), Yancey continued to often be a lone vote of dissent towards the city's mayor. When Menino had previously served alongside Yancey on the council, he had voiced his dislike for Yancey's confrontational and contrarian approach. During the mayoralty of Marty Walsh (who succeeded Menino as mayor in 2014), Yancey continued his tradition on the council as a frequent and often lone voice of opposition to the city's mayors.

During James M. Kelly's lengthy council presidency, Yancey was often at odds with Kelly over matters relating to race. Yancey alleged that Kelly was a racist, which Kelly denied being.

During Yancey's tenure, he was successful in advocating for the construction of a new police station and a new library branch location in his district, but was unable to realize his long sought establishment of a new high school in Mattapan.

=== First term (1984–85) ===
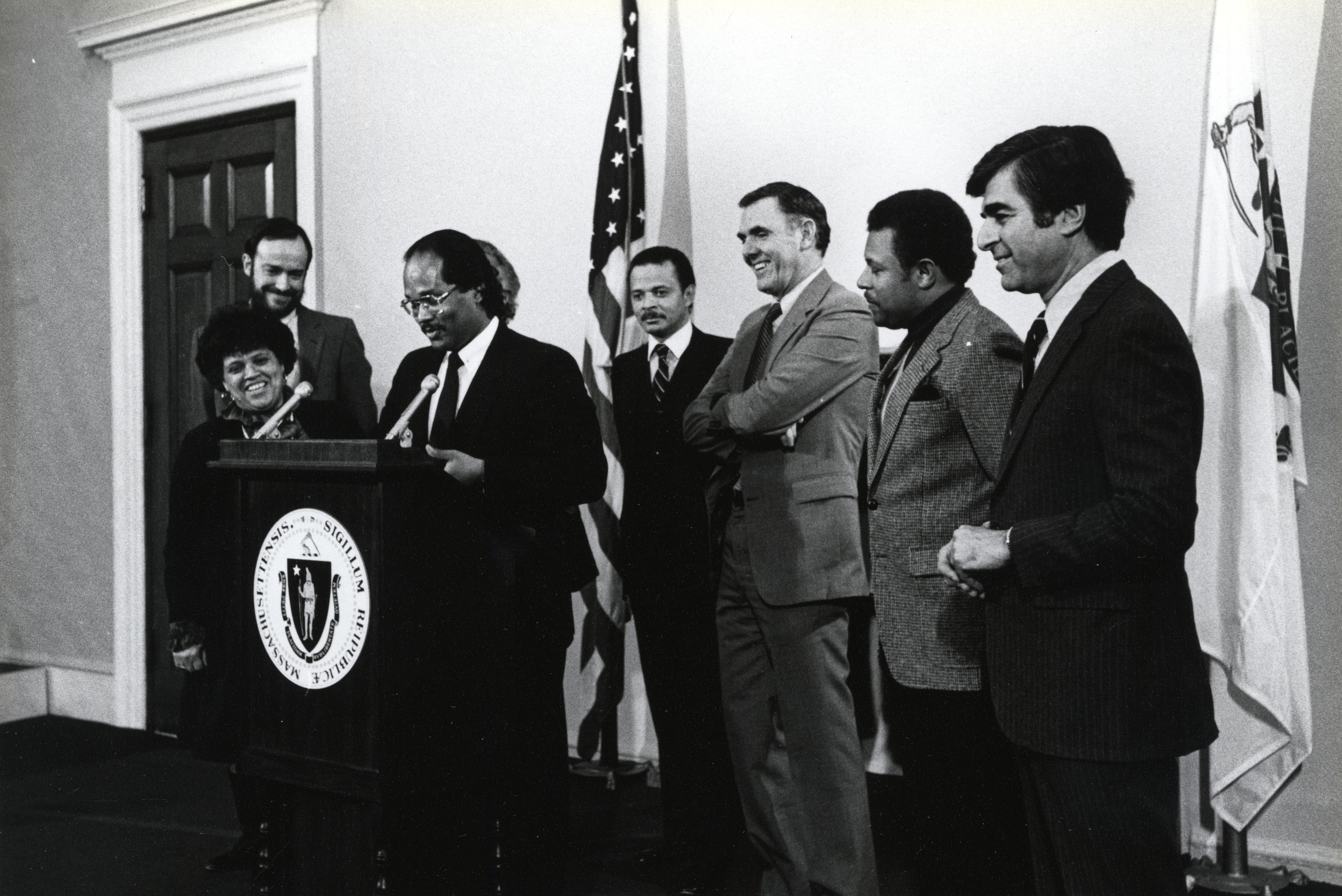
Yancey (at lectern) speaking at an event, circa 1984–87; L–R: Cambridge Clr. Saundra Graham, State Rep. Tom Gallagher, Yancey, unidentified, Mayor Flynn, Boston Clr. Bruce Bolling, Gov. Michael Dukakis

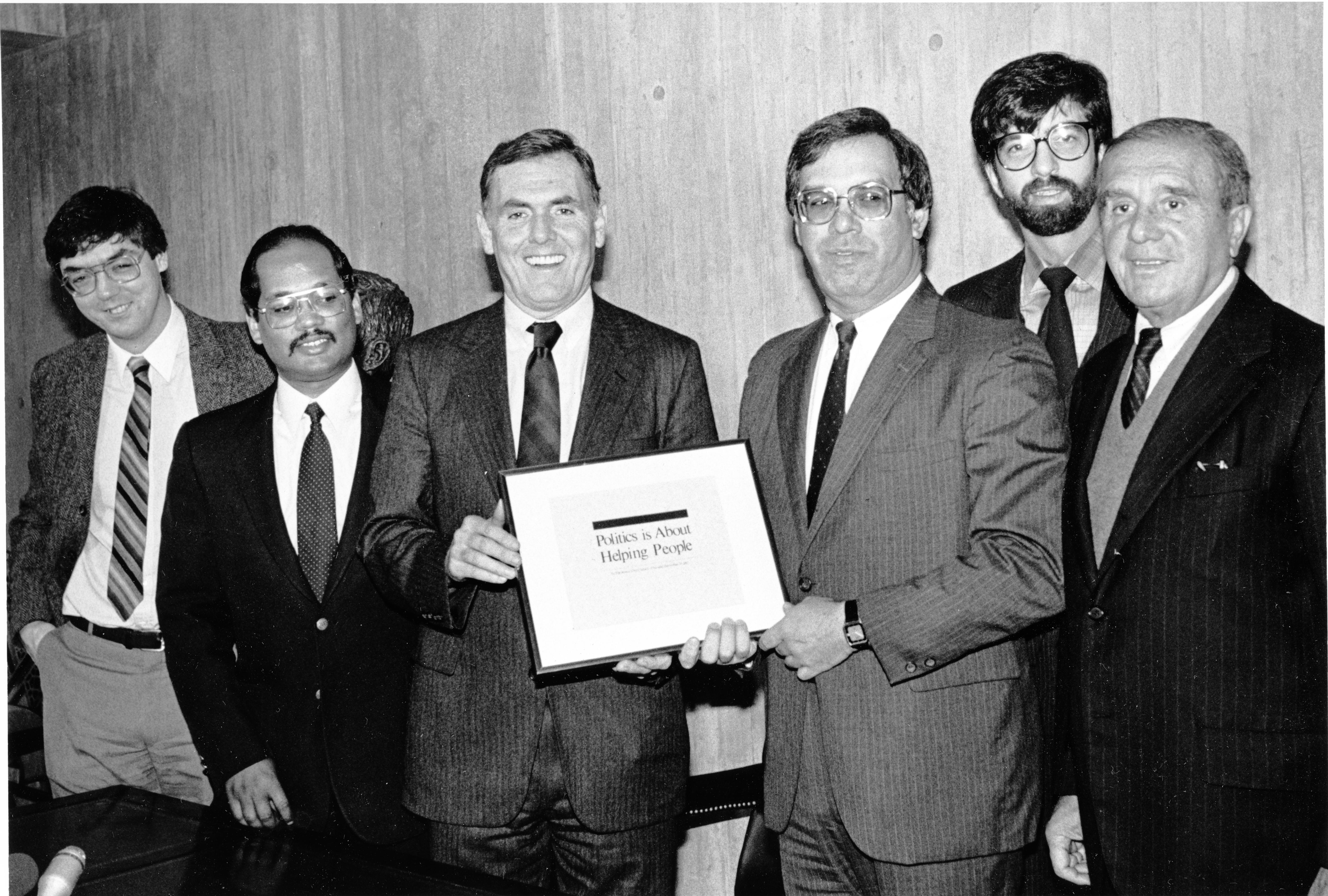
Clr. Brian J. McLaughlin, Yancey, Mayor Flynn, Clr. Thomas Menino, Clr. David Scondras, and Clr. Christopher A. Iannella, circa 1984–87

Yancey opposed South African Apartheid. In 1984, he was a chief champion of an adopted ordinance that divested $12.5 million of city assets from companies which did business in South Africa. Due to his work on this ordinance, he received an invitation to speak at the United Nations. Boston was one of the first United States cities to pass such legislation.

In 1984, Yancey brought about the creation of the council's Post Audit & Oversight committee. This committee existed until 2016, when its roles were transferred to other committees (a Post Audit Committee was re-established in 2020 by then-council president Kim Janey).

In October 1984, Yancey was one of five councilors to vote against James M. Kelly's package of amendments for a pending housing ordinance. The majority of councilors, however, voted in support of Kelly's package in the 8–5 vote. Kelly's package most notably removed Mayor Flynn's plan to expand the number of rent controlled apartments in the city. After this, at the same council meeting, Yancey was one of six councilors to vote in support of a proposal put forth by Councilor Scondras to substitute Kelly's package with an amended version of Flynn's proposed housing package that retained more of Flynn's proposals. This proposal failed in a 6–7 vote, and the council voted to adopt a final version of Kelly's package in another 8–5 vote, in which Yancey again dissented.

=== Second term (1986–87) ===
Yancey shakes hands with Corazon Aquino (President President of the Philippines) in 1986 as Mayor Flynn and others look on

Yancey was re-elected to a second term in 1985.

==== 1986 Massachusetts Auditor campaign ====
In 1986, Yancey unsuccessfully sought the Democratic nomination for Massachusetts state auditor. His opponents were state senator A. Joseph DeNucci, fellow Boston city councilor Maura Hennigan, and state representative Richard T. Moore. The four contenders launched their campaigns after the incumbent auditor, John J. Finnegan, made the surprise announcement in March that he would not seek another term. Yancey was the only black candidate seeking statewide office in Massachusetts that year.

At the party's state convention in May, Yancey placed third in delegate votes. He placed just above the necessary 15% threshold at the state convention to qualify for the ballot in the September primary election. DeNucci had held a vast lead at the convention, receiving 54.3%; while Maura Henigan placed second at 20.6% and Yancey received 15.1%. Moore was eliminated from the race, after only 10% of delegates at the convention, less than the threshold for inclusion in the primary. Yancey had, in the initial tally of delegate votes, also been set to be eliminated. However, several challenges were filed to delegates, and some delegates that had initially backed DeNucci also shifted their votes before the finalization of the first ballot in order to keep Yancey in contention.

Yancey placed third in the Democratic primary, behind DeNucci and Hennigan. Yancey received 11.3% of the vote, Hennigan received 34.7% of the vote, and DeNucci received 54.0% of the vote.

=== Third term (1988–89) ===
Yancey was re-elected to a third term in 1987.

In 1989, Yancey introduced a proposal to direct two-thirds of money seized in drug raids to neighborhood anti-crime organizations. At the time, the (on average $240,000) seized in drug raids was evenly divided between the Boston Police Department (BPD) and the district attorneys office to fund their anti-drug efforts. Yancey proposed a home rule petition that, if passed, would eliminate the money received by the district attorneys office and decrease the share received by the police department by 20%, instead directing that money to community organizations. The BPD (including Superintendent Francis Roache), the district attorney, and police unions such as the Boston Police Patrolmen's Association opposed the proposal. Peter J. Howe of The Boston Globe described the proposal as "refueling the nasty, years-old feud between [Yancey] and the Boston Police Department".

As part of his opposition to South African Apartheid, Yancey served as Vice President of the United States Conference on Apartheid.

In 1989, Yancey proposed an ordinance to mandate that 65% of money seized in drug raids by the city's police be directed to community youth groups, drug treatment facilities, and neighborhood crime watch groups. This would have been a shift from the existing model of splitting it evenly between the police department and local district attorney's office to fund drug investigations.

=== Fourth term (1990–91) ===
In 1989, Yancey won re-election without any opposition.

At a May 1991 council meeting related to matters of the city's police department, an expletive-laden argument arose between Yancey and Councilors Dapper O'Neil and James M. Kelly. Kelly and Yancey had numerous heated exchanges publicly and privately, but the 1991 exchange and another in 1993 (during Yancey's fifth term) stood out as particularly heated. The 1991 exchange occurred at a meeting where both Yancey and Councilor David Scondras were highly critical of racial bias in the city's policing.

Yancey and several other Boston politicians, including City Councilor Thomas Menino and School Committee member Juanita Wade, publicly took issue with Mayor Flynn's refusal to allow high schools to distribute condoms for HIV/AIDS prevention.

=== Fifth term (1992–93) ===
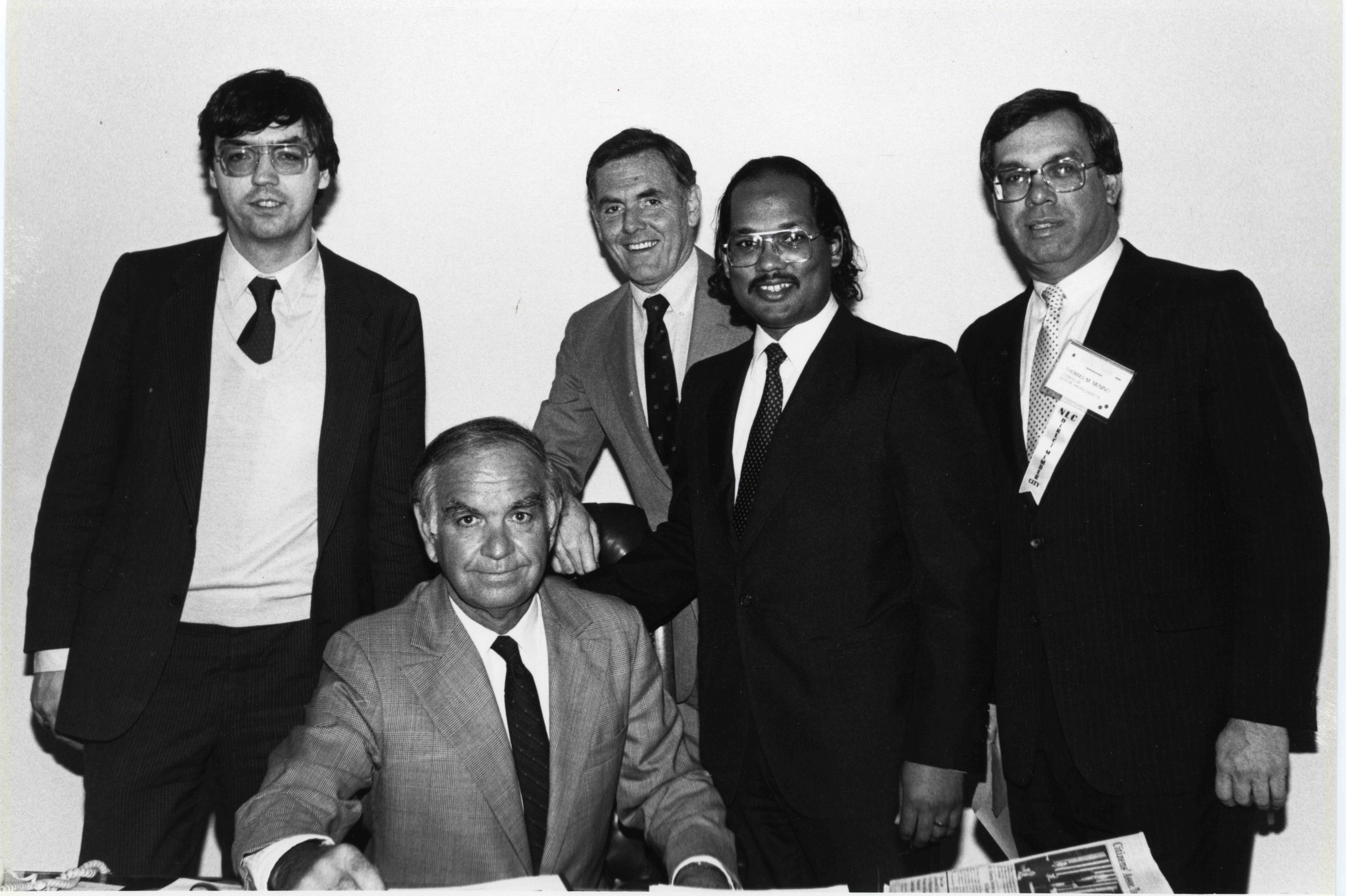
Yancey and Boston officials with U.S. Congressman Joseph Moakley, circa 1984–93; L–R: Clr. McLaughlin, Rep. Mokley, Mayor Flynn, Clr. Yancey, and Clr. Menino

Yancey was re-elected to a fifth term in 1991.

Yancey began his fifth term by riffling some feathers during the first vote: the election of a council president. Prior to this vote, it had been widely expected that incumbent Christopher A. Iannella would go unanimously supported for another term. Yancey, cast his vote instead for Rosaria Salerno. However, after it became clear that she was not on path to receive enough votes to be elected, Solarno withdrew herself for consideration and motion for the council be recorded as unanimously electing Ianella, something which was not objected to.

With Bruce Bolling's brief interregnum from council service after losing in 1991, Yancey became the council's senior (longest tenured incumbent) black member.

==== 1992 congressional and party committee campaigns ====
In 1992, Yancey challenged U.S. Rep. Joseph P. Kennedy II for the 8th Congressional District seat and received 11,005 votes or 19.3 percent of the vote.

At the same time, Yancey also challenged incumbent Bruce Bolling for 2nd Suffolk district seat on the state committee of the Democratic Party. The committeeman position was a locally-elected office included on Democratic primary ballots. This came several months after Bolling had been handed an electoral defeat: Bolling had unsuccessfully attempted to jump from district councilor to at-large councilor in 1991, being briefly ousted from the council due to this defeat before re-joining the council after the death of at-large councilor Christopher A. Iannella. Yancey and Bolling, both African Americans, had differed on the council in their approaches to government. Yancey had been critical of Bolling's style, which focused on deal brokering. Yancey argued that there was a need for more aggressive leadership in the state party, and argued framed ousting Bolling (an 8 year incumbent on the state party committee) as a means of shaking up its leadership. Bolling ultimately fended-off Yancey's challenge.

=== Sixth term (1994–95) ===
Yancey was re-elected to a sixth term in 1993.

After the end of apartheid and election of Nelson Mandela as the post-apartheid president of South Africa, Yancey urged for Boston to reinvest in South Africa.

==== 1994 lieutenant gubernatorial campaign ====
Yancey campaigned for Democratic nomination for lieutenant governor of Massachusetts in 1994.

=== Seventh term (1996–97) ===
Yancey was re-elected to a seventh term in 1995.

In 1996, Council President James M. Kelley blocked a resolution co-sponsored by Yancey which would have condemned the burning of black churches in the American South and urged that the federal government assist in reconstruction of damaged churches.

Yancey supported unsuccessful 1996 efforts to pass a state assault weapons ban.

=== Eighth term (1998–99) ===
Yancey was re-elected to an eighth term in 1997.

In 1999, Yancey proposed an ordinance to provide funding for a state-of-the-art high school to be built on the land of the former Boston State Hospital. A 1996 blue-ribbon commission had recommended building a school there. After introducing his 1999 ordinance, Yancey would advocate for this proposal frequently for many years.

==== 1998 congressional campaign ====
In 1998, Yancey was one of ten Democrats, who ran in the primary for the open seat when Kennedy decided not to seek reelection. Yancey placed seventh in the primary with 4,437 votes.

=== Ninth term (2000–01) and council presidency (2001) ===
Yancey was re-elected to a ninth term in 1999.

Yancey served as Council President in 2001. He was elected on January 1, 2001. Ahead of the vote, it had become clear that James M. Kelly, who had served as Council President for the previous seven years, had insufficient support among fellow councilors for an eighth-consecutive term as council president. In a surprise move, Kelly backed Yancey to serve as the next council president. Kelly cited Yancey's independence and his ability to collaborate with others as attributes that would make him a suitable council president. Yancey was elected president an 8–5 vote of the council. Yancey had had no prior knowledge that Kelly was maneuvering to have him elected council president.

=== Tenth term (2002–03) ===
Yancey was re-elected to a tenth term in 2001.

=== Eleventh term (2004–05) ===
Yancey was re-elected to an eleventh term in 2003, fending off a challenge from Ego Ezedi, a former aide to Congressman Michael Capuano. The race between Yancey and Ezedi was very closely contested. The race was heated, with Ezedi accusing Yancey of failing the district, and Yancey accusing Ezedi (who like Yancey and most voters of the district, was African-American) of being the favored candidate of the city's white politicians. Yancey's supporters characterized Ezedi as being a pawn of Mayor Menino. Ezedi generally outperformed Yancey in white-predominant precincts of the district, but Yancey trounced him in black-majority precincts. Ezedi later ran (unsuccessfully) six years afterwards for an at-large council seat.

=== Twelfth term (2006–07) ===
Yancey was re-elected to a twelfth term in 2005.

=== Thirteenth term (2008–09) ===
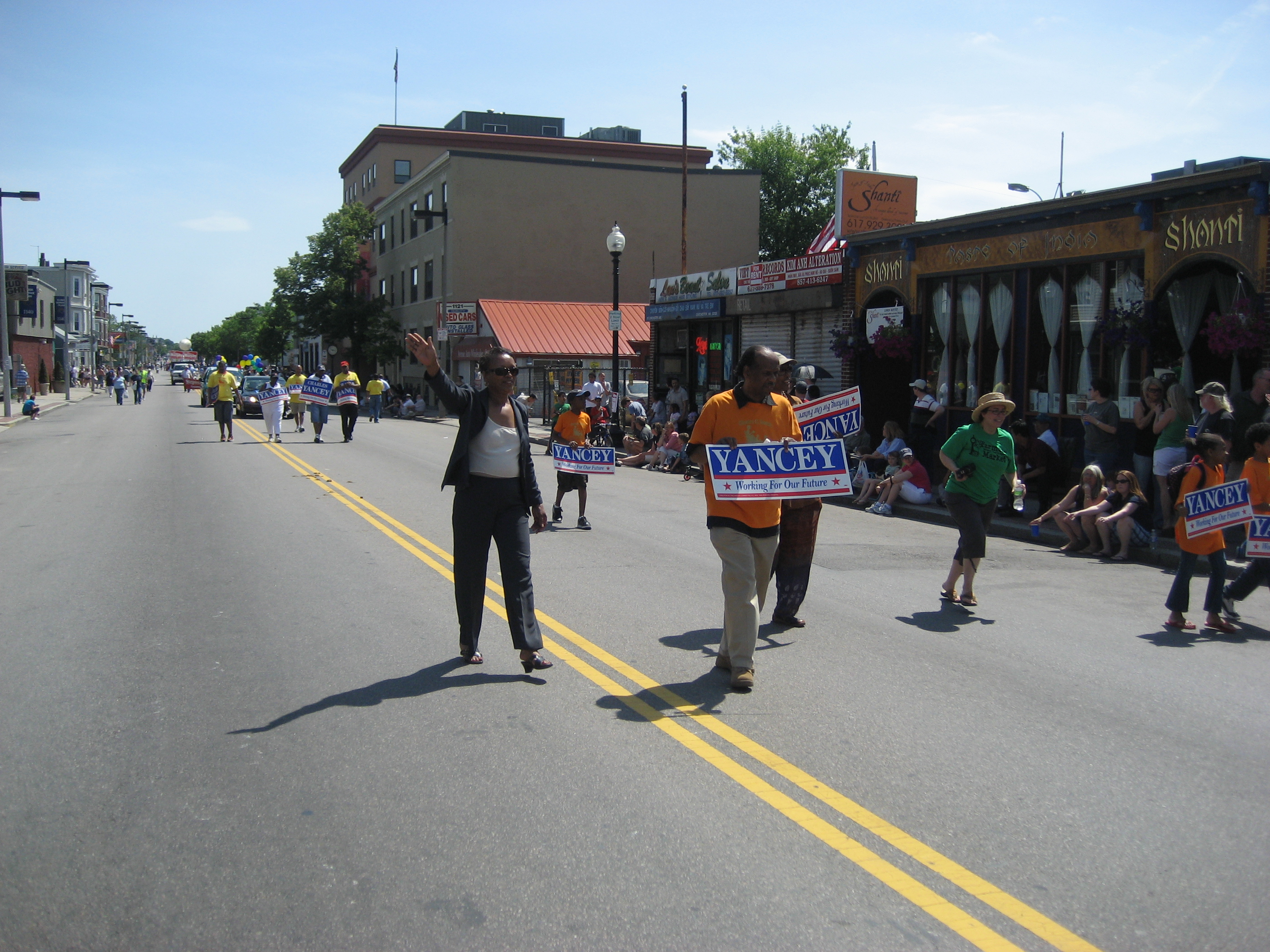
Supporters of Yancey's 2009 re-election marching in the 2009 Dorchester Day Parade

Yancey was re-elected to a thirteenth term in 2007.

During the 2008 Democratic Party presidential primaries, Yancey endorsed the candidacy of Barack Obama.

In 2009 Yancey criticized the lack of public input in government decisions of where to permit the construction of cell phone towers.

=== Fourteenth term (2010–11) ===
Yancey was re-elected to a fourteenth term in 2009.

In the 2010s, a pet project of Yancey's continued to be advocating for the creation of a "first class" high school in Mattapan. He voted against the creation of a downtown school in 2013, which was seen as being in protest of the Council's failure to vote approve his proposed Mattapan high school. In 2011, Yancey raised objections to the new headquarters office for the school department receiving funding while funding was not being provided for high school students in Mattapan. He argued that the school district administrators would be seeing an improvement of facilities, while Mattapan high school students were still being refused an improvement of their facilities. Yancey argued that money could be found for the new school if those in the city government cared to find funding, exclaiming, "I know if there was a priority, we can make it happen". He pointed to how the city managed to find funding for such projects as the Boston Convention and Exhibition Center.

In 2011, Yancey was the only member of the Boston City Council to vote against an ordinance requiring fingerprints and criminal records to be provided by individuals applying for certain licenses.

=== Fifteenth term (2012–13) ===
Yancey was re-elected to a fifteenth term in 2011.

In October 2012 Yancey and Bill Linehan were the only two council members to dissent in an 11–2 vote to adopt Councilman Tito Jackson's compromise redistricting map. One of the most contentious aspects of the 2010s districting process was debates surrounding had been the boundaries of Yancey's own district (district 4). Yancey opposed the removal of any portions of Mattapan from his own district's boundaries. The map used for the previous decade had split Mattapan before district 4 and district. Yancey considers it a top priority to unite Mattapan into a single district within his own district. Mayor Menino had vetoed the first two council maps sent to him by the council (before Jackson's compromise) because he believed that the percent of district 4's population under those maps that was black would be a problematic "packing" populace, and Menino demanded that new maps be drawn that "unpacked" district 4 and diversified the racial composition of other districts.

In 2013, Yancey again proposed an ordinance for his proposed high school on the land of the former Boston State Hospital. His ordinance proposed a $115 loan be taken to fund the school. The council defeated this ordinance 8–5 in July.

==== 2013 mayoral campaign ====
Yancey was a candidate in the 2013 election for mayor of Boston. In a candidate survey for the mayoral race, Yancey announced positions on issues including keeping a cap on the number of charter schools in Boston, allowing for a citywide vote on a potential casino bid, and increasing the number of street workers in Boston to curb youth violence. He finished 9th in a field of 12 candidates in the preliminary election, earning 2.1% of the total vote.

Yancey's campaign, which an article published in The Boston Globe described as "unconventional", operated with very little money.

City laws allowed Yancey to run both for council and the mayoralty, but not to simultaneously serve in both positions if he were to win both.

=== Sixteenth term (2014–15) ===
While he lost his mayoral campaign, Yancey (by 2013, the longest-serving incumbent on the council) was re-elected for a sixteenth consecutive term on the city council in the 2013 council elections.

In January 2014, Yancey joined most of the members of the council's de facto progressive wing in siding against Bill Linehan's bid for council president. Linehan, however, prevailed in the vote for council president. Having also supported earlier abandoned bids for the council presidency by Matt O'Malley and Tito Jackson, Yancey voted for Ayanna Pressley against Linehan.

Yancey opposed plans to conduct research on Biosafety Level-4 pathogens at the National Biocontainment Laboratory operated at the Boston University Medical Center by the National Emerging Infectious Diseases Laboratories. At the time, the facility was only permitted to be used for research on pathogens categorized Biosafety Level-3 and below. Yancey joined with community groups, including the Union Park Neighborhood Association. In early 2014, he proposed an ordinance that would have instated a city prohibition on the research, and held hearings in early 2014 regarding community public safety concerns about the prospect of such being conducted at a lab in the city (such fears of the threat posed in the instance of a lab biosecurity breach). Yancey's proposed ban was defeated in March 2014 in an 8–5 vote of the council.

=== Defeat in 2015 council election ===
In November 2015, Yancey was unseated from the council by newcomer Andrea Campbell. Yancey received 38.4% of the vote, compared to Campbell's 61.3%.

By the time of the 2015, election, Yancey had out-tenured all incumbent councilors by more than 13 years.

Campbell out-fundraised Yancey and built a far more significant ground operation than he had fielded for the election. Campbell was privately favored by many of the city's politicians, and also garnered enthusiastic support of many activists.

In October 2015, Yancey joined Councilor's Pressley, Wu, and Zakim as the only votes against a pay raise for city councilor. This was despite Yancey having earlier voted in support of an even more substantial pay raise for councilors (which Mayor Walsh vetoed). Yancey's vote was in light of his tight race with Campbell, as the vote occurred only weeks before the general election, with Yancey concerned about the potential for him to face voter backlash for a vote in favor of a wage increase.

== Later politics ==
In 2016, Yancey expressed his interest in potentially running as a candidate for the Suffolk County register of probate election, an election which was an open race. There was speculation in 2017 that Yancey was exploring a run for his former council seat in that year's election after a letter circulated from Yancey's campaign committee criticizing Campbell's support for charter schools.

Yancey endorsed Acting Mayor Kim Janey's candidacy in first round of the 2021 Boston mayoral election. Janey is a relative of Yancey's own longtime campaign manager, Daniel Janey.

== Other work ==
Yancey has taught courses in state and local politics at Bunker Hill Community College in Boston, and received an honorary Doctor of Laws degree from Mount Ida College in 2001.

== Personal life ==
Around 1970, Yancey married his wife, Marzetta Morisette Yancey. Together, they had four children. As of 2013, they had five grandchildren.

== Electoral history ==
=== City council elections ===
1979 Boston City Council election
Candidates	Preliminary election		General election	
Candidates	Votes	%	Votes	%
Lawrence DiCara (incumbent)	42,339	6.50	69,102	8.15
Christopher A. Iannella (incumbent)	45,184	6.94	69,069	8.15
Raymond Flynn (incumbent)	45,648	7.01	66,662	7.86
Frederick C. Langone (incumbent)	48,063	7.38	64,873	7.65
Dapper O'Neil (incumbent)	48,781	7.49	60,846	7.17
Joseph M. Tierney (incumbent)	43,759	6.72	58,674	6.92
John W. Sears	41,108	6.31	58,205	6.87
Rosmarie E. Sansone (incumbent)	46,391	7.12	57,552	6.79
Patrick F. McDonough (incumbent)	34,646	5.32	55,123	6.50
Louise Day Hicks (incumbent)	44,659	6.86	54,714	6.45
James T. Brett	34,941	5.37	51,767	6.11
Terence P. McDermott	30,124	4.63	39,882	4.70
Barbara A. Ware	19,519	2.30	33,951	4.01
Stephen C. Farrell	20,173	3.10	27,038	3.19
Charles Yancey	14,487	2.22	22,301	2.63
Edward Brooks	19,772	3.04	24,165	2.85
Richard M. Lane	17,424	2.68	17,771	2.10
David Joseph McKay	12,873	1.98	15,981	1.89
Jeannette L. Tracy	11,711	1.80		
Phyllis Igoe	9,205	1.41		
Stephen Michael Cidlevich	8,645	1.33		
Eugene A. Cavicchi	6,626	1.02		
Peter K. Hadley	5,187	0.80		

1981 Boston City Council election (district 4)
Candidates	Preliminary election		General election	
Candidates	Votes	%	Votes	%
Raymond Flynn (incumbent)	31,898	7.77	53,136	9.54
Christopher A. Iannella (incumbent)	25,462	6.20	44,621	8.01
Dapper O'Neil (incumbent)	24,240	5.91	40,474	7.27
Frederick C. Langone (incumbent)	23,000	5.60	39,780	7.14
Joseph M. Tierney (incumbent)	17,649	4.30	35,185	6.32
Michael J. McCormack	14,178	3.45	33,861	6.08
Terence P. McDermott	11,981	2.92	31,707	5.69
Maura Hennigan	14,325	3.49	31,637	5.68
Bruce Bolling	15,273	3.72	30,672	5.51
James M. Kelly	14,941	3.64	30,079	5.40
Patrick F. McDonough (incumbent)	17,165	4.18	29,591	5.31
Edmund McNamara	12,007	2.93	29,301	5.26
David Scondras	11,616	2.83	28,571	5.13
Charles Yancey	12,378	3.02	27,007	4.85
Francis X. Coppinger	11,034	2.69	21,675	3.89
Craig Lankhorst	10,301	2.51	20,769	3.73
Pamela J. Gilman	10,070	2.45	14,776	2.65
Gerard P. McHale	10,407	2.54	14,173	2.54
Joseph W. Casper	9,906	2.41		
Frederick T. Scopa	9,444	2.30		
John F. Melia	8,788	2.14		
Stephen G. Michaels	8,325	2.03		
Brian Hickey	8,222	2.00		
John P. Grady	7,855	1.91		
Richard B. Hogan	7,794	1.90		
Edward M. McCormack	7,610	1.85		
William G. Broderick	7,134	1.74		
Joseph E. Maher	6,269	1.53		
Maureen Craven Slade	5,759	1.40		
Althea Garrison	5,442	1.33		
Joseph T. Fitzpatrick	3,947	0.96		
David F. Burnes	3,784	0.92		
David Alan Mittell Jr.	3,660	0.89		
Francis X. Goode	3,227	0.79		
Thomas P. Casserly	3,005	0.73		
Warren I. Brown	3,001	0.73		
John S. MacDonald	2,881	0.70		
Edward J. DeSantis	2,688	0.65		
John B’Smith III	1,936	0.47		
John K. Rees	1,791	0.44		

1983 Boston City Council election (district 4)
Candidates	Preliminary election		General election	
Candidates	Votes	%	Votes	%
Charles Yancey	4,239	18.47	7,898	51.7
Bill Owens Jr.	4,405	17.21	7,364	48.07
Gerald Anderson	1,889	14.4		
Locksley H. Bryan	980	7.5		
Benjamin F. Thompson	601	4.6		
Carter D. Kimbrel	469	3.6		
Bobby J. Wallace	254	1.9		
Arthur Williams	241	1.8		

1985 Boston City Council election (district 4)
Candidates	Votes	%
Charles Yancey (incumbent)	1,934	100

1987 Boston City Council election (district 4)
Candidates	Votes	%
Charles Yancey (incumbent)	4,828	80.1
Arthur Williams	1,196	19.9

1989 Boston City Council election (district 4)
Candidates	Votes	%
Charles Yancey (incumbent)	3,215	87.9
J. R. Rucker	442	12.1

1991 Boston City Council election (district 4)
Candidates	Votes	%
Charles Yancey (incumbent)	4,742	89.5
J. R. Rucker	558	10.5

1993 Boston City Council election (district 4)
Candidates	Votes	%
Charles Yancey (incumbent)	5,302	87.6
J. R. Rucker	753	12.4

1995 Boston City Council election (district 4)
Candidates	Preliminary election		General election	
Candidates	Votes	%	Votes	%
Charles Yancey (incumbent)	1,189	65.5	2,646	65.1
Vikki Middleton	564	31.1	1,419	34.9
J. R. Rucker	63	3.5		

1997 Boston City Council election (district 4)
Candidates	Preliminary election		General election	
Candidates	Votes	%	Votes	%
Charles Yancey (incumbent)	1,166	52.5	2,781	64.2
Bill Owens	632	28.5	1,552	35.8
Vikki Middleton	374	16.9		
J. R. Rucker	47	2.1		

1999 Boston City Council election (district 4)
Candidates	Preliminary election		General election	
Candidates	Votes	%	Votes	%
Charles Yancey (incumbent)	1,166	79.0	2,243	82.4
Vikki Middleton	247	16.7	479	17.6
J. R. Rucker	63	4.3		

2001 Boston City Council election (district 4)
Candidates	Votes	%
Charles Yancey (incumbent)	6,164	86.7
Vikki Middleton	943	13.13

2003 Boston City Council election (district 4)
Candidates	Preliminary election		General election	
Candidates	Votes	%	Votes	%
Charles Yancey (incumbent)	1,901	54.36	3,679	55.17%
Ego E. Ezedi Jr.	1,544	44.15%	2,990	44.83%
Arthur L. Sutton	52	1.49%		

2005 Boston City Council election (district 4)
Candidates	Votes	%
Charles Yancey (incumbent)	6,724	88.52
J. R. Rucker	851	11.20
Jaha Hughes write-in	4	0.05
all others	17	0.22

2007 Boston City Council election (district 4)
Candidates	Votes	%
Charles Yancey (incumbent)	2,559	89.01
J. R. Rucker	308	10.71
all others	8	0.28

2009 Boston City Council election (district 4)
Candidates	Votes	%
Charles Yancey (incumbent)	6,039	98.52
all others	91	1.58
Total votes	6,130	100
blank votes	3,228	–
Ballots cast	9,418	–

2011 Boston City Council election (district 4)
Candidates	Votes	%
Charles Yancey (incumbent)	3,893	88.54
J. R. Rucker	435	9.89%

2013 Boston City Council election (district 4)
Candidates	Preliminary election		General election	
Candidates	Votes	%	Votes	%
Charles Yancey (incumbent)	6,144	65.39	8,145	68.34
Terrance J. Williams	1,547	30.84	3,676	16.46
Steven Godfrey	849	9.04		
Divo Rodrigues Monteiro	768	8.17		
all others	88	0.94	98	0.82

2015 Boston City Council election (district 4)
Candidates	Preliminary election		General election	
Candidates	Votes	%	Votes	%
Andrea Campbell	1,982	57.92	4,311	61.32
Charles Yancey	1,159	33.87	2,701	38.42
Terrance J. Williams	217	6.34		
Jovan J. Lacet	60	1.75		
all others	4	0.12	18	0.26

=== Congressional elections ===
1992 Massachusetts 8th congressional district Democratic primary
Party	Candidate	Votes	%
Democratic	Joseph P. Kennedy II (incumbent)	45,993	80.6
Democratic	Charles Calvin Yancey	11,005	19.3
Write-In	scattering	49	0.1
Total votes		57,047	100

1998 Massachusetts 8th congressional district Democratic primary
Party	Candidate	Votes	%
Democratic	Michael E. Capuano	19,446	22.9
Democratic	Raymond L. Flynn	14,839	17.5
Democratic	George Bachrach	12,157	14.3
Democratic	John T. Connor	11,092	13.1
Democratic	Marjorie O'Neill Clapprood	10,446	12.3
Democratic	Christopher F. Gabrieli	5,740	6.8
Democratic	Charles Calvin Yancey	4,437	5.2
Democratic	Susan M. Tracy	2,858	3.4
Democratic	Thomas M. Keane Jr.	2,150	2.5
Democratic	Alex Rodriguez	1,802	2.1
Write-In	scattering	21	0.0
Total votes		84,988	100

=== Committeeman election ===
1992 2nd Suffolk Democratic Party State Committeeman election
Candidates	Votes	%
Bruce C. Bolling (incumbent)	4,386	58.2
Charles Calvin Yancey	3,153	41.8

=== Mayoral election ===
2013 Boston mayoral election
Candidate	Primary election		General election	
Candidate	Votes	%	Votes	%
Marty Walsh	20,854	18.47	72,583	51.54
John R. Connolly	19,435	17.21	67,694	48.07
Charlotte Golar Richie	15,546	13.77		
Daniel F. Conley	12,775	11.32		
Felix G. Arroyo	9,895	8.76		
John Barros	9,148	8.10		
Robert Consalvo	8,603	7.62		
Michael P. Ross	8,164	7.23		
Bill Walczak	3,825	3.39		
Charles Yancey	2,389	2.12		
Charles Clemons	1,800	1.59		
David Wyatt	334	0.30		
Write-ins	130	0.12	560	0.40
Total	112,898	100	140,837	100

Preceded by James M. Kelly	President of the Boston City Council; 2001	Succeeded by Michael F. Flaherty
