= Charlotte Golar Richie =

American politician

Commissioner of the Massachusetts Commission Against Discrimination
- In office 2014–2017
- Appointed by: Deval Patrick

Senior Advisor to the Governor of Massachusetts for Federal, State and Community affairs
- In office 2007–2009
- Governor: Deval Patrick

Boston Chief of Housing & Director of the Boston Department of Neighborhood Development
- In office 1999–2007
- Mayor: Thomas Menino

Member of the Massachusetts House of Representatives from the 5th Suffolk District
- In office 1995–1999
- Preceded by: Althea Garrison
- Succeeded by: Marie St. Fleur

Personal details
- Born: December 11, 1958 (age 67) Brooklyn
- Party: Democratic
- Spouse: Winston Richie
- Children: 2
- Parents: Simeon Golar (father); Pauline Wellington (mother)
- Education: Rutgers College; Columbia University School of Journalism
- Occupation: Politician

Charlotte Golar Richie (born December 11, 1958, in Brooklyn) serves as the senior vice president for public policy, advocacy and government relations for YouthBuild USA. She formerly served in the Massachusetts House of Representatives and held other government positions. She was a candidate for the mayor of Boston in the 2013 election, placing third in the nonpartisan primary election.

== Early life ==
Richie is one of two daughters of New York state judge Simeon Golar and his wife, schoolteacher Pauline Golar (née Wellington). She graduated from Rutgers University and then tried her hand at acting, appearing off-Broadway and in minor roles on soap operas. She spent two years with the Peace Corps in Kenya teaching English to schoolchildren, spurring an interest in journalism and public service. She also met her future husband, another volunteer, in Kenya. Golar returned to the United States where she earned a master's degree at the Columbia University School of Journalism and married Winston Richie.

== Government ==
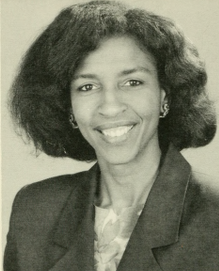
Richie during her tenure in the Massachusetts House of Representatives

=== Massachusetts House (1995–1999) ===
Richie represented the 5th Suffolk District in the Massachusetts House of Representatives from 1995 until she resigned in 1999 to become the Executive Director of the Department of Neighborhood Development for the City of Boston. As a freshman legislator, she was elected vice-chair of the city's State House delegation and chair of the Housing and Urban Development Committee, the first time in three decades that a freshman won a leadership position. As a State Representative, Richie sponsored a $296 million housing bond bill to develop low-cost housing.

Richie was first elected in 1994, defeating freshman Republican member Althea Garrison by a broad margin.

In an era where it was common for state representatives to have entirely white staffs, Richie stood out in having a highly ethnically diverse staff. She also earned praise for cultivating budding political talents of many of her staffers. One of her staffers who later earned independent political note was Linda Dorcena Forry.

=== Boston Chief of Housing and Director of Neighborhood Development (1999–2007) ===
Richie's appointment to Chief of Housing and Director of the Department of Neighborhood Development coincided with Mayor Thomas Menino's decision to elevate the post to a cabinet position.

=== Senior advisor to the governor (2007–2009) ===
Richie remained with the DND until 2007 when she became Governor Deval Patrick's senior advisor for federal, state and community affairs. In 2009, she left the Patrick administration to become the executive director of the Governor's re-election committee.

=== 2013 mayoral campaign ===
In 2013, Richie ran as a candidate in Boston's nonpartisan mayoral election. Mayor Menino had opted to forgo re-election, making the 2013 election the city' first open race for mayor in twenty years. In the primary election on September 25, she came in third with 14% of the vote, falling short of advancing to the general election in November. Polling near the close of the primary election campaign had placed her in the top-tier of candidates, along with John R. Connolly and Marty Walsh. Unlike the other two polling in the top-tier of candidates, however, Richie lacked the campaign finances needed to run an advertisement blitz in advance of the primary election. One of Richie's other challenges in her campaign was time constraints. She had announced her candidacy later than any other major contender. Additionally, she stepped away from the campaign trail for some time during her campaign in order to attend to the preparations for her father's funeral.

Richie placed third in the preliminary round, finishing only 4,000 votes shy of advancing to the general election. After placing third and being eliminated, she endorsed Walsh over Connolly in the general election. Her endorsement was regarded as a major boon to Walsh's, ultimately successful, general election campaign. One of Richie's motivations to endorse him had been their past experience of overlapping as colleagues in the state house (representing adjoining districts).

=== Massachusetts Commission Against Discrimination (2014–2017) ===
From 2014 to 2017, Richie served as a Commissioner of the Massachusetts Commission Against Discrimination. She had been appointed to the commission by Governor Patrick, and was sworn-in by the governor in August 2014.

=== Later involvement in government and politics ===
In 2021, Richie served as a co-chair of the committee overseeing Michelle Wu's transition into the office of mayor of Boston.

== Nonprofit work ==
In 2010, Richie began working for YouthBuild USA, a youth and community development program based in Somerville, Massachusetts. She also serves as chair of the board of Higher Ground Boston, as an advisor to Mothers for Justice and Equality and on the advisory council of the Haiti Fund at The Boston Foundation. She serves as the interim chair of the External Advisory Board of UMass Boston. She also serves as chair of the Massachusetts Women of Color Coalition Advisory Board. She is a member of the boards of the Point32Health Foundation and the Massachusetts Women’s Political Caucus (a non-partisan group). She is also on advisory boards of Boston's Higher Ground, the Commonwealth Seminar, and Children’s HealthWatch.

Richie has co-produced several programs for the WGBH Educational Foundation's Forum Network.

== Personal life ==
Richie and her husband, Winston, have two adult daughters.

== Electoral history ==
=== State House ===
1994

1994 Massachusetts State House of Representatives 5th Suffolk district Democratic primary
Party	Candidate	Votes	%
Democratic	Charlotte Golar Richie	893	56.41
Democratic	Irene R. Roman	690	43.59
Total votes		1,583	100

1994 Massachusetts State House of Representatives 5th Suffolk election
Party	Candidate	Votes	%
Democratic	Charlotte Golar Richie	2,101	54.94
Republican	Althea Garrison (incumbent)	1,723	45.06
Total votes		3,824	100

1996

1996 Massachusetts State House of Representatives 5th Suffolk district Democratic primary
Party	Candidate	Votes	%
Democratic	Charlotte Golar Richie (incumbent)	828	73.40
Democratic	Irene R. Roman	300	26.60
Total votes		1,128	100

1996 Massachusetts State House of Representatives 5th Suffolk election
Party	Candidate	Votes	%
Democratic	Charlotte Golar Richie (incumbent)	3,684	68.69
Republican	Althea Garrison	1,666	31.07
Write-in	Other	13	0.24
Total votes		5,363	100

1998

1998 Massachusetts State House of Representatives 5th Suffolk district Democratic primary
Party	Candidate	Votes	%
Democratic	Charlotte Golar Richie (incumbent)	1,218	58.47
Democratic	Althea Garrison	865	41.53
Total votes		2,083	100

1998 Massachusetts State House of Representatives 5th Suffolk election
Party	Candidate	Votes	%
Democratic	Charlotte Golar Richie (incumbent)	3,544	97.39
Write-in	Other	95	2.61
Total votes		3,639	100

=== Mayor ===
2013 Boston mayoral election
Candidate	Primary election		General election	
Candidate	Votes	%	Votes	%
Marty Walsh	20,854	18.47	72,583	51.54
John R. Connolly	19,435	17.21	67,694	48.07
Charlotte Golar Richie	15,546	13.77		
Daniel F. Conley	12,775	11.32		
Felix G. Arroyo	9,895	8.76		
John Barros	9,148	8.10		
Robert Consalvo	8,603	7.62		
Michael P. Ross	8,164	7.23		
Bill Walczak	3,825	3.39		
Charles Yancey	2,389	2.12		
Charles Clemons	1,800	1.59		
David Wyatt	334	0.30		
Write-ins	130	0.12	560	0.40
Total	112,898	100	140,837	100
