= John Barros =

American politician

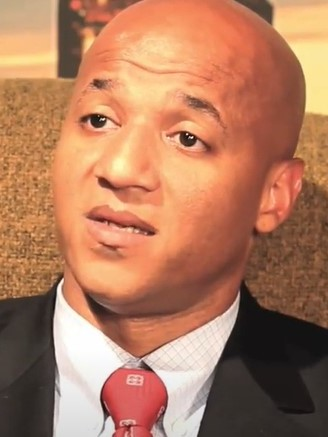
- Barros in 2013

Boston Chief of Economic Development
- In office February 2014 – February 2021
- Mayor: Marty Walsh
- Preceded by: Office established
- Succeeded by: Segun Idowu; Midori Morikawa (interim)

Member of the Boston School Committee
- In office 2010–2013

Personal details
- Born: 1973 (age 52–53) Roxbury, Boston Massachusetts, U.S.
- Education: Dartmouth College; Tufts University
- Profession: Businessman; Civic Organizer

John F. Barros (born 1973) is an American politician, businessman, and civic organizer who was formerly the chief of economic development for the City of Boston. He also served as the executive director of the Dudley Street Neighborhood Initiative. He unsuccessfully ran for mayor of Boston in 2013 and 2021. He is currently the managing principal for the Boston office of the real estate firm Cushman & Wakefield.

== Early years and education ==
John Barros is the son of immigrant parents from the Cape Verde Islands. His father came to Cape Cod in the 1950s to work in the cranberry bogs. Barros's parents later moved to Boston, raising John and his four siblings in the Boston neighborhood of Roxbury. He attended public school until his mid teens when he entered Boston College High school. After completing his education at BC High, Barros then went on to attend Dartmouth College in Hanover New Hampshire. At Dartmouth, John majored in Economics and African American studies. On campus he performed in the Black Underground Theater Association, served as president of the African-American Society and was an active member of the Senior Honor Society, Casque and Gauntlet (C&G). John is a candidate for a master's degree in Public Policy at Tufts University.

Barros first became involved in the Dudley Street Neighborhood Initiative (DSNI) at the age of fourteen. By the age of seventeen, he was serving on its board. He was the first youth elected to its board. As a board member of the DSNI, he was featured in the 1996 documentary "Holding Ground", which focused on the DSNI.

== Early career ==
In 1996 Barros began working as executive liability underwriter for the Chubb Group of Insurance Companies in New York City. He worked there through 1999. He worked with dot-com startups such as Priceline.com.

In 1999, he returned to Boston to assume the position of executive director of the Dudley Street Neighborhood Initiative (DSNI) in 1999. During his time working as executive director, Barros was featured in the 2012 documentary "Gaining Ground", another documentary which focused on the DNSI. He quit his position with the DSNI in order to launch a 2013 campaign for mayor.

In addition to his work with the DSNI, from 2000 through 2006 he was the director of Cape Verdean Community UNIDO. In 2002, Barros and his brothers opened a restaurant in Boston (Restaurante Cesaria) in co-ownership with each other. The restaurant was still operating under their co-ownership as of 2021. He additionally was a 2007 Barr Foundation Fellow, and worked on Barack Obama's 2008 presidential campaign.

In January 2010, Barros was appointed by Mayor Tom Menino to a seat on the Boston School Committee. He was a first Cape Verdean to serve on the committee. He resigned this position in April 2013, in preparation for his mayoral campaign. At the time he was appointed to the committee, he was additionally studying for a master's degree in public policy from Tufts University, which he later attained.

== 2013 mayoral campaign ==
Barros, a Democrat, ran the first of his two unsuccessful campaigns in Boston's nonpartisan mayoral elections in 2013. In April 2013 Barros announced his intention to run for mayor of the City of Boston. He failed to make it past the nonpartisan primary into the general election, placing sixth in the primary, with 8.10% of the vote. In the primary, The Boston Globe made a dual-endorsement of both Barros and John R. Connolly. Despite losing, Barros gained much broader recognition in Boston through his campaign for mayor.

Before he launched his own candidacy, Barros was approached by Marty Walsh about working on the campaign for Walsh's planned candidacy. Walsh and Barros had been longtime friends. The two had both grown up only blocks apart from each other. In the 2013 mayoral primary, however, Barros and Walsh found themselves running against each other.

After being eliminated, Barros endorsed Walsh in the general election. Barros campaigned avidly on behalf of Walsh's general election candidacy.

== Boston chief of economic development ==
After Walsh became mayor, he made Barros his chief of economic development. Barros's mayoral campaign had elevated his notability, and, while he seemed likely to be offered a position in Walsh's administration, it was also, initially, speculated that Barros might instead make another run for elected office, with speculation circulating about a possible run for lieutenant governor or a run in the special election for the Massachusetts House of Representatives seat vacated by Carlos Henriquez.

In February 2014, Walsh (one month into his mayoralty) appointed Barros as chief of economic development. The newly-created position oversaw economic development in the city, and also was tasked with coordinating efforts across numerous city departments. Aspects of economic development that the position was tasked overseeing included efforts to revitalize city neighborhoods, promotion of the city nationally and abroad, efforts to accelerate the creation of new jobs, and efforts to support small business in the city. The position included purview over the Boston Redevelopment Authority.

Barros's first day on the job was February 11, 2014. He was the first person to hold this new position. As chief of economic development, Barros claimed that his top priorities included economic equity, neighborhood development, and innovation. Barros received a $135,000 annual salary in the position. He initially did not have a staff when he took office. However, Walsh soon gave Barros' position a ten-person staff and a budget of $500,000.

Barros' first two years in the position saw him hold a low public profile, working largely behind-the-scenes. However, in January 2016, he garnered great public attention when it was announced that General Electric would be moving its headquarters to Boston, a matter that Barros had played a key role in achieving for Boston. The Boston Globe jointly named Barros, Jay Ash, Steve Kadish, and Dan Koh its 2016 "Bostonians of the Year", crediting them with having been behind the deal which brought General Electric's headquarters to the city, each having done so, "with marching orders from their bosses". In 2018, Boston magazine ran ranked Barros 15th on its list of "The 100 Most Influential People in Boston", writing,

He brought GE to Boston; that alone (despite the company’s recent troubles) earns him a spot on this list. Everywhere you look in the city—from the development in Dudley Square to the Seaport—you’ll find Barros’s fingerprints. You’ll also find believers ready to follow his lead. He’s the odds-on favorite to be the next mayor of Boston.

Early into his tenure, Barros stated his desire for businesses to extend their opening hours later into the night. In his position, Barros co-chaired the Imagine Boston 2030 citywide vision planning blueprint. He worked in partnership with MassChallenge to work to, "expand innovation efforts in Boston." He also worked with MassRobotics on putting together their proposal for a grant for their MassWorks program. Disclosed emails show that he played a role in coordinating with other Massachusetts cities about Boston's bid for the 2024 Summer Olympics.

In February 2021, Barros resigned from the position in order to launch his second candidacy for mayor of Boston. Mayor Walsh would not be seeking re-election, being nominated by newly-inaugurated U.S. president Joe Biden to serve in Cabinet as secretary of labor.

== 2021 mayoral campaign ==
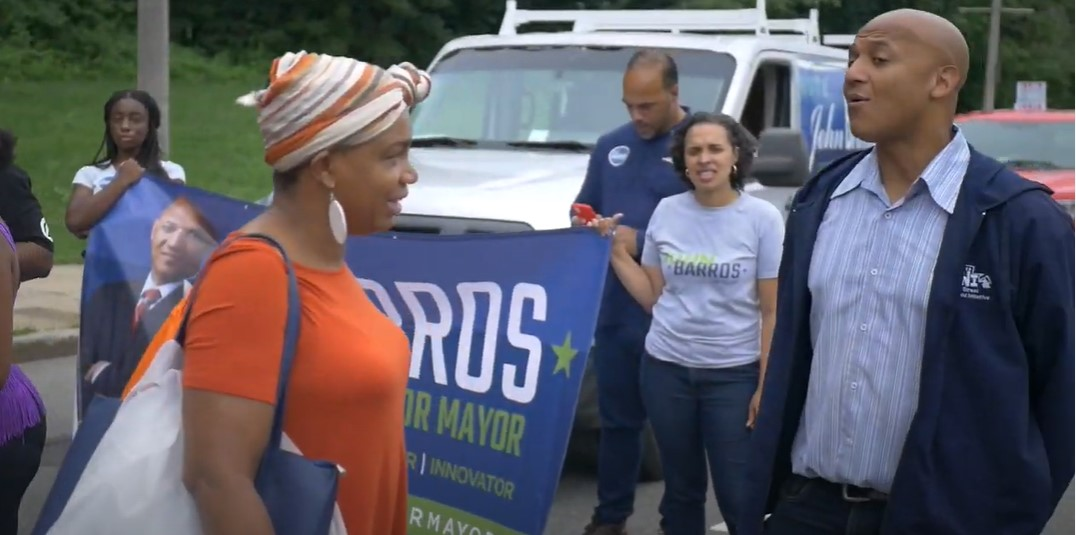
Barros (right) campaigning in 2021

In March 2021, Barros announced he would run for mayor in the 2021 Boston mayoral election. If elected he would have been the first black man to become mayor of Boston. In a September 10, 2021 article, Ellen Barry of the New York Times described Barros as having, "struggled to get traction." On the day of the primary election, Gregory Krieg of CNN described Barros as, "a heavy underdog". On the day of the primary election, The Boston Globe characterized him as, "trailing the pack" in opinion polls. However, in the days leading up to the election, Barros expressed confidence, questioning the accuracy of polling. Barros ultimately placed fifth, with over 3% of the vote.

== Subsequent career ==
In November 2021, Barros became managing principal of the Boston office of the real estate firm Cushman & Wakefield. In January 2022, Barros became the first-ever visiting professional at Boston College's Joseph E. Corcoran Center for Real Estate and Urban Action at the Carroll School of Management.

On January 9, 2026, the board of the Massachusetts Convention Center Authority voted 13-0 to appoint Barros to serve on year as its interim CEO and executive director, for a stint beginning later that month.

== Awards and recognition ==
Among the awards and recognition Barros has received are the inaugural Community Service Award from the Boston Day & Evening Academy in 2008; the Robert Leo Ruffin Award from the Archdiocese of Boston in 2004; and the Action for Boston Community Development Roxbury Community Award in 2000.

== Personal life ==
Barros married his wife, Tchintcia, in 2011. He has two children and resides in the Dorchester neighborhood of Boston, where he has served as a lay leader at St. Patrick's Catholic Church.

== Electoral history ==
2013 Boston mayoral election
Candidate	Primary election		General election	
Candidate	Votes	%	Votes	%
Marty Walsh	20,854	18.47	72,583	51.54
John R. Connolly	19,435	17.21	67,694	48.07
Charlotte Golar Richie	15,546	13.77		
Daniel F. Conley	12,775	11.32		
Felix G. Arroyo	9,895	8.76		
John Barros	9,148	8.10		
Robert Consalvo	8,603	7.62		
Michael P. Ross	8,164	7.23		
Bill Walczak	3,825	3.39		
Charles Yancey	2,389	2.12		
Charles Clemmons	1,800	1.59		
David Wyatt	334	0.30		
Write-ins	130	0.12	560	0.40
Total	112,898	100	140,837	100

2021 Boston mayoral election
Candidate	Primary election		General election	
Candidate	Votes	%	Votes	%
Michelle Wu	36,060	33.40	91,794	63.96
Annissa Essaibi George	24,268	22.48	51,125	35.62
Andrea Campbell	21,299	19.73		
Kim Janey (acting incumbent)	21,047	19.49		
John Barros	3,459	3.20		
Robert Cappucci	1,185	1.10		
Jon Santiago (withdrawn)	368	0.34		
Richard Spagnuolo	286	0.26		
Scattering	0	0.00	595	0.41
Total	107,972	100	144,380	100
