= Simeon Golar =

American jurist

Simeon Golar (1928–2013) was an American jurist who served as a justice of the New York State Supreme Court in Queens County.

== Early life and education ==
Golar was born in 1928 in Chester, South Carolina, to teenage mother Lottie Jackson and was adopted soon afterwards by the Golar family. He moved to New York City as a small child and attended the city's public schools. After earning a business degree from the City College of New York, he attended the New York University School of Law, where one of his classmates was future mayor David Dinkins.

== Career ==
Golar entered politics with the Liberal Party and in 1966 ran, unsuccessfully but notably for the era, for New York State attorney general, polling nearly 285,000 votes. In 1967, Mayor John V. Lindsay appointed him chairman of the New York City Commission on Human Rights, where he urged civic groups to file discrimination complaints to test the city's fair-housing laws. Three years later, Lindsay elevated him to NYCHA chair, making Golar the first head of the authority who had himself grown up in public housing. His tenure coincided with the contentious Forest Hills low-income housing plan, where he defended integration in the face of fierce community opposition.

== Personal life ==
In 1956, Golar married Brooklyn schoolteacher Pauline Wellington and they had two daughters, Katherine and Charlotte Golar Richie, who served in the Massachusetts House of Representatives and ran for mayor of Boston.
