= BostInno =

Local news site and publishing platform

- Available in: English
- Founded: 2008
- Headquarters: Boston, Massachusetts, United States
- Website: Official Webpage

BostInno is a local online news site and community publishing platform covering "the view from inside" innovation in Boston. It was founded in 2008 as a community startup blog by Chase Garbarino, CEO and co-founder of Streetwise Media, and Kevin McCarthy, CTO and co-founder. On December 7, 2009, BostInno was relaunched as a news platform profiling local innovation across verticals including tech, venture capital, city news, food, higher education, and sports.

BostInno is operated by Streetwise Media, the online media company founded by Chase Garbarino, Kevin McCarthy, and Greg Gomer which seeks to reinvent the model of local news online.

BostInno headquarters are in Faneuil Hall in Boston.

== History ==
BostInno was created in 2008 in Boston, Massachusetts as a blog hosted on WordPress. It later had its time as a wiki and then a Twitter aggregator. BostInno re-launched on December 7, 2009, and became a news platform for the "hub of the universe", Boston, as a flagship property of Streetwise Media, co-founded by Garbarino and McCarthy. Since its creation, BostInno has been dedicated to covering city news in a new way online.

On November 18, 2012, BostInno was acquired by Boston Business Journal's owner American City Business Journals.

== About ==
BostInno is an online news property focused on covering local innovation across all industries, not just technology. The team at BostInno is made up of an editorial team as well as guest contributors via BostInno's community publishing platform, Channels. BostInno seeks to build and connect a community that engages its audience in discussion about the latest innovation in the city. BostInno receives over 1 million unique visits each month.

BostInno is the first property of Streetwise Media, which also owns InTheCapital, based in Washington D.C. BostInno is the fastest growing news property in New England.

BostInno was voted #1 Startup in Boston by the Next Web in 2011.

== Channels ==
BostInno provides companies the ability to publish on its platform via Channels - branded pages that reside on BostInno on which a company can share unlimited content. In May 2012, over 200 companies were publishing to the platform.
