= Marie St. Fleur =

American politician (born 1962)

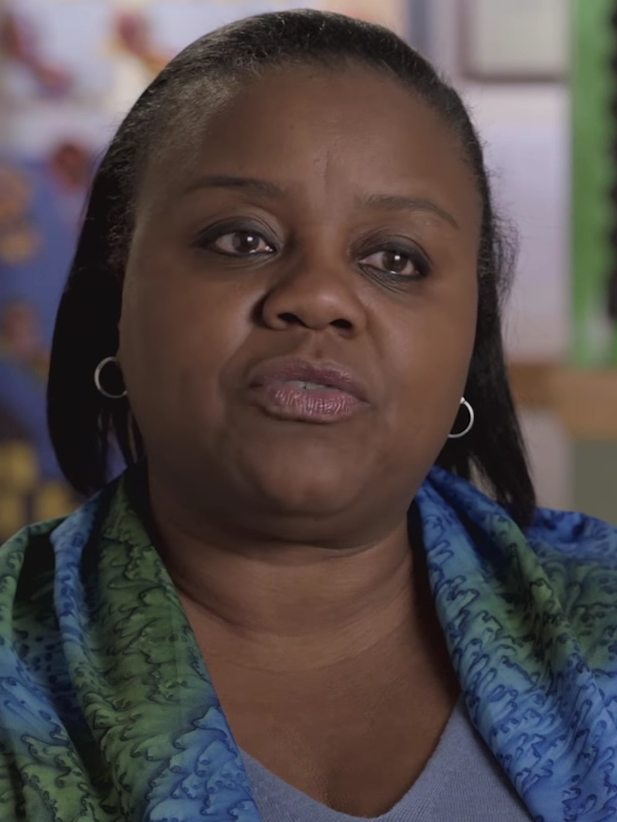
- St. Fleur in 2016

Member of the Massachusetts House of Representatives from the 5th Suffolk district
- In office 1999–2011
- Preceded by: Charlotte Golar Richie
- Succeeded by: Carlos Henriquez

Personal details
- Born: May 4, 1962 (age 64) Grande-Rivière-du-Nord, Haiti
- Party: Democratic
- Spouse: Jean B. Lauture
- Children: 3
- Education: University of Massachusetts Amherst (BA); Boston College (JD)

Marie P. St. Fleur (born May 4, 1962) is a Haitian American politician and lawyer. former Massachusetts State Representative who represented the Fifth Suffolk district from 1999-2011. Her district consisted of parts of the Boston neighborhoods Dorchester and Roxbury. She is the first Haitian-American to hold public office in Massachusetts. Representative St. Fleur was one of the most active supporters of John Kerry's presidential bid, often traveling to Florida to do outreach on his behalf. She was appointed Vice-Chair of the powerful Ways and Means Committee by House Speaker Salvatore DiMasi, a leadership position that has tremendous influence in the budget process. On January 30, 2006 Thomas F. Reilly, candidate for the Democratic nomination for governor, selected St. Fleur as his preferred running mate for lieutenant governor. However, she withdrew from the lieutenant gubernatorial primary the next day after The Boston Globe reported that she was delinquent in tax debts and owed over $40,000 in student loans.

In February 2019, Marie St. Fleur announced that she had taken a position as the Chief Operating Officer of Union Twist a company that has been established to operate a marijuana dispensary in Framingham, Massachusetts.

== Personal life and education ==
St. Fleur emigrated from Haiti as a child and attended the University of Massachusetts Amherst and Boston College Law School. She began practicing law in 1987. In 1999, she became the first Haitian immigrant to hold public office in Massachusetts by winning a special election to succeed Charlotte Golar Richie. She was the vice chair of the House Ways and Means committee. She has three children.

== Legal career ==
From 1987 to 1988 she was a judicial law clerk for the Massachusetts Superior Court. From 1988 to 1991 she was an assistant district attorney in the Middlesex County District Attorney's office. From 1991 to 1999 she was an assistant attorney general in the Massachusetts Attorney General's office.

== Political career ==
=== Early political career ===
St. Fleur worked as a staffer to Boston Mayor Thomas Menino.

=== State House (1999–2011) ===
St. Fleur represented the Fifth Suffolk district from 1999-2011. Her district consisted of parts of the Boston neighborhoods Dorchester and Roxbury. She was the first Haitian-American to hold public office in Massachusetts. St. Fleur was appointed Vice-Chair of the powerful Ways and Means Committee by House Speaker Salvatore DiMasi, a leadership position that has tremendous influence in the budget process.

Representative St. Fleur was one of the most active supporters of John Kerry's presidential campaign in 2004, often traveling to Florida to do outreach on his behalf.

St. Fluery supported charter schools and in-state tuition for undocumented immigrants. While a practicing Catholic she supported same-sex marriage (despite this being contrary to the church's pronouncements on the issue). St. Fleur was an avid proponent of programs to combat domestic violence and to aid battered women.

During the 2008 Democratic presidential primaries, St. Fleur initially supported Hillary Clinton's campaign for president.

In February 2010 St. Fleury announced that she would not run for re-election and in April 2010 she accepted a job as director of intergovernmental relations for the City of Boston. She later left that position in 2013.

=== 2006 lieutenant gubernatorial bid ===
On January 30, 2006 Thomas F. Reilly, candidate for the Democratic nomination for governor announced St. Fleur as his running mate. Candidates for governor and lieutenant governor run separately through the primary, then are joined as a single ticket for the election. The following day she withdrew after The Boston Globe reported that she was delinquent in tax debts and owed over $40,000 in student loans.

The issue of St. Fleur's withdrawal received additional media attention when it was mentioned in an exchange between Reilly and rivals for the Democratic nomination Deval Patrick and Chris Gabrieli during the gubernatorial debate on September 7, 2006. Reilly accused Gabrieli of having leaked a secret report about St. Fleur's finances to the Boston Globe. Later in the debate he asked Patrick, who has confessed to tax problems of his own: "If Marie St. Fleur can't be lieutenant governor, how can you be governor?"

== Post-political career ==
From 2013 to 2016 she served as the president and chief executive officer of the Bessie Tartt Wilson Initiative for Children, Inc. From 2019 to 2020 she served as the executive director of King Boston (also known as the Boston Foundation). Since 2016 she has served as the principal of St. Fleur Communications.

In February 2019, Marie St. Fleur announced that she had taken a position as the Chief Operating Officer of Union Twist a company that has been established to operate a marijuana dispensary in Framingham, Massachusetts.
