= Bill Walczak =

William "Bill" Walczak
- Born: Elizabeth, New Jersey
- Education: Additional graduate level coursework at Boston University School of Public Health and Harvard University
- Alma mater: University of Massachusetts, B.A. in history
- Occupation: Executive
- Employer: Shawmut Construction
- Known for: community activism; mayoral candidacy
- Title: Vice President of Community Relations
- Political party: Democratic
- Spouse: Linda
- Children: Matthew (videographer); Elizabeth (Boston Foundation in education policy)
- Website: http://www.billwalczak.com/

Bill Walczak is a community activist in Boston, Massachusetts, United States. He was a candidate for mayor of Boston in 2013.

== Family ==
Walczak is a resident of Savin Hill, where he lives with his wife, Linda. Originally from New Jersey, he came to Boston on a Boston University scholarship but dropped out after one semester to work on the lettuce boycott of the United Farm Workers.

== Education ==
Walczak graduated in history from the University of Massachusetts Boston in 1979; he is also a member of the board of the University of Massachusetts Boston Alumni and Friends.

== Career ==
Walczak founded and ran the nonprofit Codman Square Health Center in Dorchester for more than thirty years. Walczak co-founded in 1979 the center, which provides over 22,000 area residents with primary medical care, urgent care, radiology, dentistry, and eye care services. According to Walczak, “Codman Square was burning down, and it needed something, and we decided that was a health center. We figured if you combine the impact of good health care and good education, we could turn peoples’ lives around.” Walczak had come to the attention of the neighborhood association in 1979 by asking a lot of questions, and was chosen as the Health Center's director. Walczak established the health center in the basement of an old library and eventually took over the entire building.

In 2000, Walczak co-founded the Codman Academy Charter Public School and remains its president.

In early 2011, he became president of Steward Carney Hospital in Dorchester. In April 2012, he left the position. An article in the Boston Globe speculated that Walczak's activist background did not fit with the ethos of the private company, Steward Health Care System, that owned the hospital. Walczak had proposed a three-year plan which required additional financial investment from Steward. Steward claimed Walczak had resigned, though Walczak denied this.

He was formerly vice president of community relations at Shawmut Design and Construction.

Walczak is the founding president of the Massachusetts Nonprofit Network.

Walczak is the chairman of STRIVE, a job training program located in Dorchester; and is a member of the Executive Advisory Council for WBUR Radio. He was co-founder of Codman Academy Charter Public School and is a Senior Fellow at the Boston University Institute for Nonprofit Management and Leadership, a Barr Foundation Fellow, a board member of the Massachusetts Business Alliance for Education, advisory board of the Boston Landmarks Orchestra, and the advisory council of the Haiti Fund at the Boston Foundation, among others.

== 2013 Boston mayoral campaign ==
Walczak announced his candidacy on April 7, 2013, at which time he was the seventh person to announce a bid for Boston mayor. He finished ninth in the nonpartisan primary election with 3% of the vote.

== Awards and honors ==
- The Public Health Award for Outstanding Service to the Community from the Harvard School of Public Health (1994),
- Health Center Director of the Year from the Massachusetts League of Community Health Centers (1993)
- The Robert Quinn Award for Outstanding Community Leadership from the University of Massachusetts Boston (2008)
- Champions in Health Care lifetime achievement award from the Boston Business Journal (2010)
- Outstanding Leadership in Promoting and Protecting the Health of the Residents of the Commonwealth award from the Massachusetts Health Council (2010).
