= Daniel F. Conley =

American lawyer

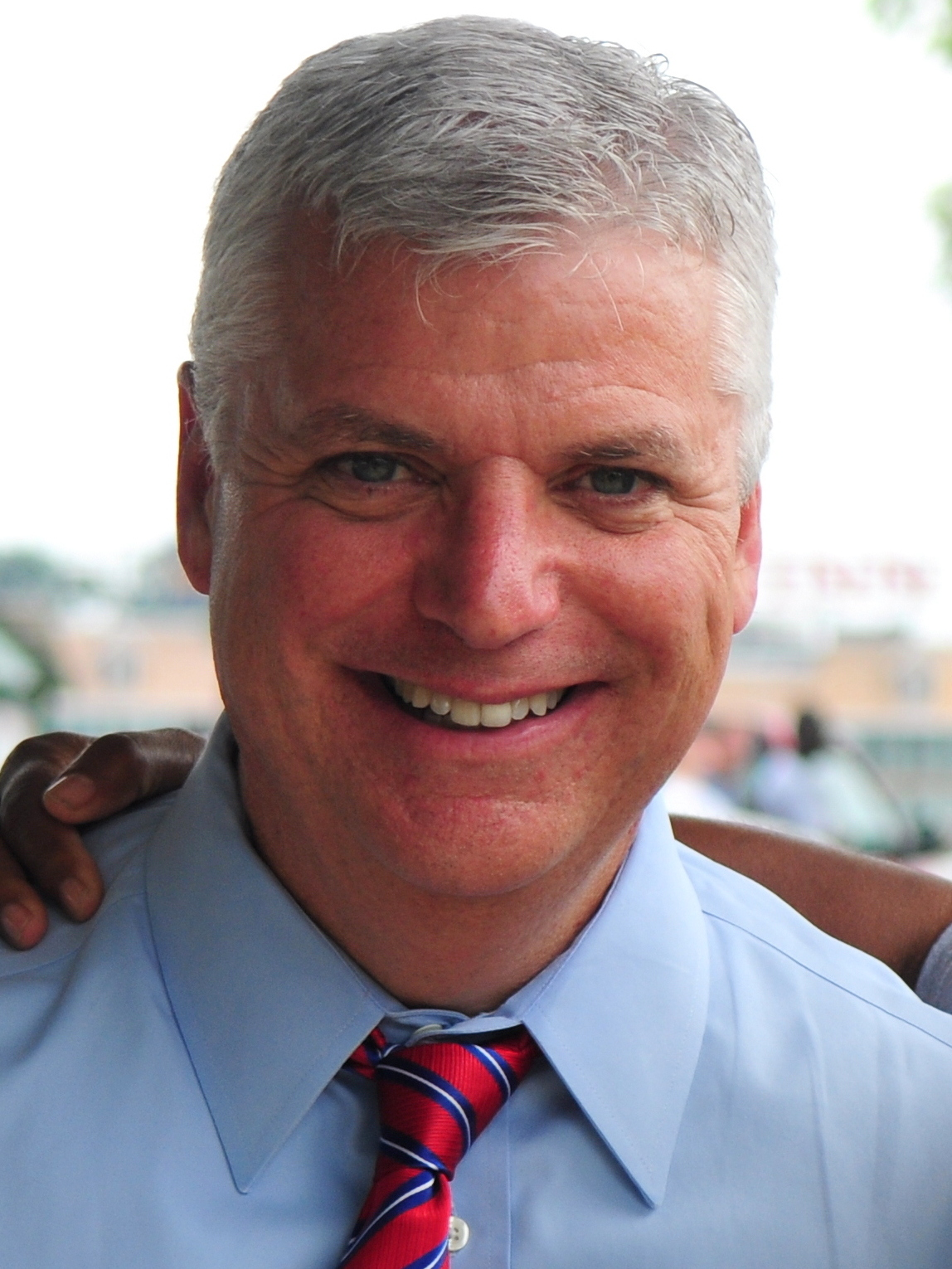
- Conley in 2013

District Attorney of Suffolk County, Massachusetts
- In office 2002–2018
- Appointed by: Jane Swift
- Preceded by: Ralph C. Martin II
- Succeeded by: John P. Pappas

Member of the Boston City Council from the 5th district
- In office 1994–2002
- Preceded by: Tom Menino
- Succeeded by: Robert Consalvo

Personal details
- Party: Democratic
- Education: Stonehill College (BA); Suffolk University (JD)

Daniel F. Conley is an American attorney and politician who served as the district attorney for Suffolk County, Massachusetts from 2002 to 2018. Appointed to the office in February 2002, Conley was later elected on November 5, 2002, and again in 2006, 2010, and 2014. He retired in 2018 to enter private practice.

Conley placed fourth of 12 candidates when he ran unsuccessfully in the 2013 Boston mayoral election to replace Thomas Menino, garnering 11% of the vote in the preliminary election. In February 2018, Boston newspapers reported that Conley would not seek re-election to a fifth term as Suffolk DA. On September 12, 2018, Conley announced that his final day as district attorney would be September 26 and that he would join Mintz Levin, a private law firm, in a special counsel role.

== Education ==
Conley graduated from Stonehill College, cum laude, with a Bachelor of Arts degree in economics in 1980 and Suffolk University Law School in 1983.

== Career ==
He was appointed as an assistant district attorney by Suffolk County District Attorney Newman A. Flanagan shortly after passing the Massachusetts Bar Exam and assigned to the Boston Municipal Court. He later prosecuted juvenile cases in the Boston Juvenile Court.

In 1987, he was promoted to a Superior Court Trial Unit Suffolk Superior Court, where he prosecuted felony cases. He was assigned by District Attorney Newman Flanagan to Boston's new Anti-gang Violence Task Force. When gang violence reached near epidemic levels in Boston during the late 1980s and early 1990s, he was assigned by District Attorney Newman Flanagan to Boston's new Anti-Gang Violence Task Force. In 1992 he was promoted to the Homicide Unit of the D.A.'s office. Conley was an assistant district attorney for approximately nine years.

=== Boston City Council ===
In 1993, he left the Suffolk District Attorney's office to run for a seat on the Boston City Council. Constituents elected him to the District 5 seat, where he served for eight years and served several terms as chairman of the council's Public Safety Committee. He received the O'Riordan-Mundy Distinguished Legal Service Award in 1999 and remained on the City Council until he was appointed Suffolk County's 14th district attorney by Acting Governor Jane Swift on February 19, 2002. Conley won election to the office later that year.

=== District attorney ===
In 2004, Conley and the then-Commissioner of the Boston Police Department empaneled a blue-ribbon task force to evaluate the ways in which police gather and prosecutors use eyewitness evidence. In an effort to ensure that the historical wrongful convictions that came to light under his leadership never reoccurred, Conley assigned his top courtroom prosecutor to join with ranking police officials, prominent defense attorneys, and the nation's leading academic expert on eyewitness identification to review the investigative processes by which eyewitness evidence was gathered and recommend changes that would minimize the likelihood of faulty identifications.

The panel returned with reforms that were implemented by area law enforcement. The reforms prompted defense attorney Barry Scheck of the Innocence Project to cite Boston and Suffolk County as being "at the forefront of the country" in averting wrongful convictions, and eyewitness evidence expert Gary Wells to call them the "Gold Standard." "The policies he implemented [...] went beyond what even what the US Department of Justice had been recommending and provided a model not only for law enforcement but for the Supreme Judicial Court as well," the Boston Bar Association wrote.

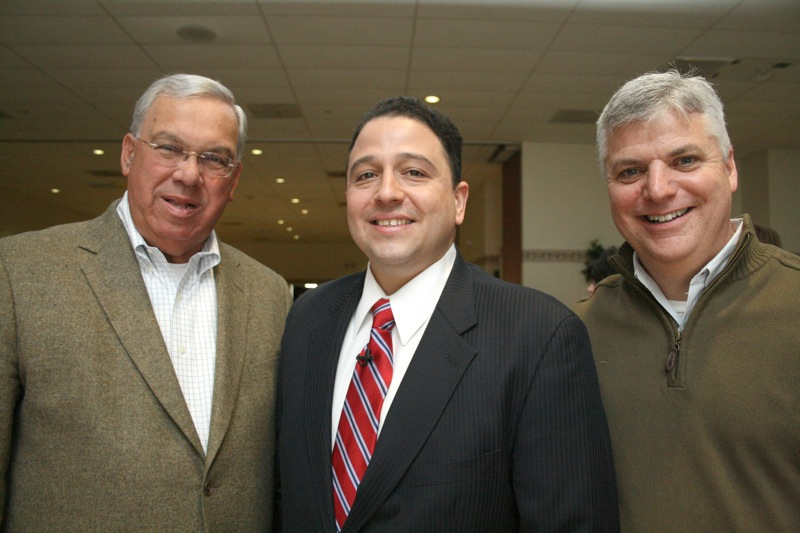
From left: Mayor of Boston Thomas Menino, Boston City Council member Robert Consalvo, and Conley in 2009

Shortly after taking office, Conley implemented a policy of assenting to any reasonable request for post-conviction testing of DNA evidence that was unavailable at the time of a defendant's trial. In 2011, Conley voiced his support, with additional recommendations, for legislation that would expand that voluntary policy statewide. "[T]his legislation codifies many of the practices that I voluntarily put in place six or seven years ago," Conley wrote to the Joint Committee on the Judiciary. "These are good practices that serve the interest of justice." In 2012, Conley formalized earlier wrongful conviction review efforts in Massachusetts first Conviction Integrity Program, which provides "a roadmap" to other offices seeking to undertake similar efforts.

Under Conley's stewardship, the Suffolk District Attorney's Office partnered with numerous service providers, government agencies, and victim advocacy groups to build the Family Justice Center of Boston. The FJCB streamlines services for victims of child abuse, intimate partner violence, and sexual crimes by coordinating the responses of numerous agencies and providers – including police, prosecutors, social workers, and others – under one roof. The burdens on victims are reduced while efforts to hold their abusers accountable under the law are enhanced.

Also operating out of the FJCB is Support to End Exploitation Now (SEEN), a multi-agency task force directed by members of Conley's office that has twice been named one of the Top 50 Innovative Government Projects by the Ash Institute for Democratic Governance and Innovation.

In 2013, Conley pushed for a referendum on the construction of a casino at Suffolk Downs to be subject to the votes of all Boston residents, rather than limited only to those living in East Boston. This created a divide between Conley and State Representative Carlo Basile (an East Boston powerbroker who strongly preferred limiting the vote only to East Boston residents), and resulted in Basile revoking his earlier endorsement of Conley's mayoral candidacy and instead supporting John R. Connolly's candidacy.

Massachusetts is one of only four states (along with the District of Columbia) that have no continuing legal education requirement for the prosecutors. To address this Conley imposed a "continuing legal education requirement for Suffolk prosecutors, which allows them to continue honing their skills and exposes them to emerging fields of criminal law".

In 2017, Conley launched the Juvenile Alternative Resolution pilot program for "young people who faced serious charges or may have had an earlier brush with the law." A year later, he expanded the program to double its capacity.

In February 2018, Conley announced that he would not be seeking reelection in the Fall. According to a statement, he intended to finish his term but was stepping aside to "give others the same opportunity" that he enjoyed as a political leader. Yet with his departure occurring as lawmakers were considering an overhaul to the criminal justice system that would reduce the number of people incarcerated, Conley surprised political observers on September 12, when he announced that he would be resigning, with three months left of his term, to take a job at Mintz Levin, a leading law firm in Boston, and at its lobbying subsidiary, ML Strategies. This decision arrived shortly after Greg Henning, who Conley had endorsed as the Democratic candidate for District Attorney, lost the election to Rachael Rollins. As a result, Governor Baker appointed Assistant District Attorney John Pappas as the interim Suffolk County District Attorney.

=== 2013 mayoral campaign ===
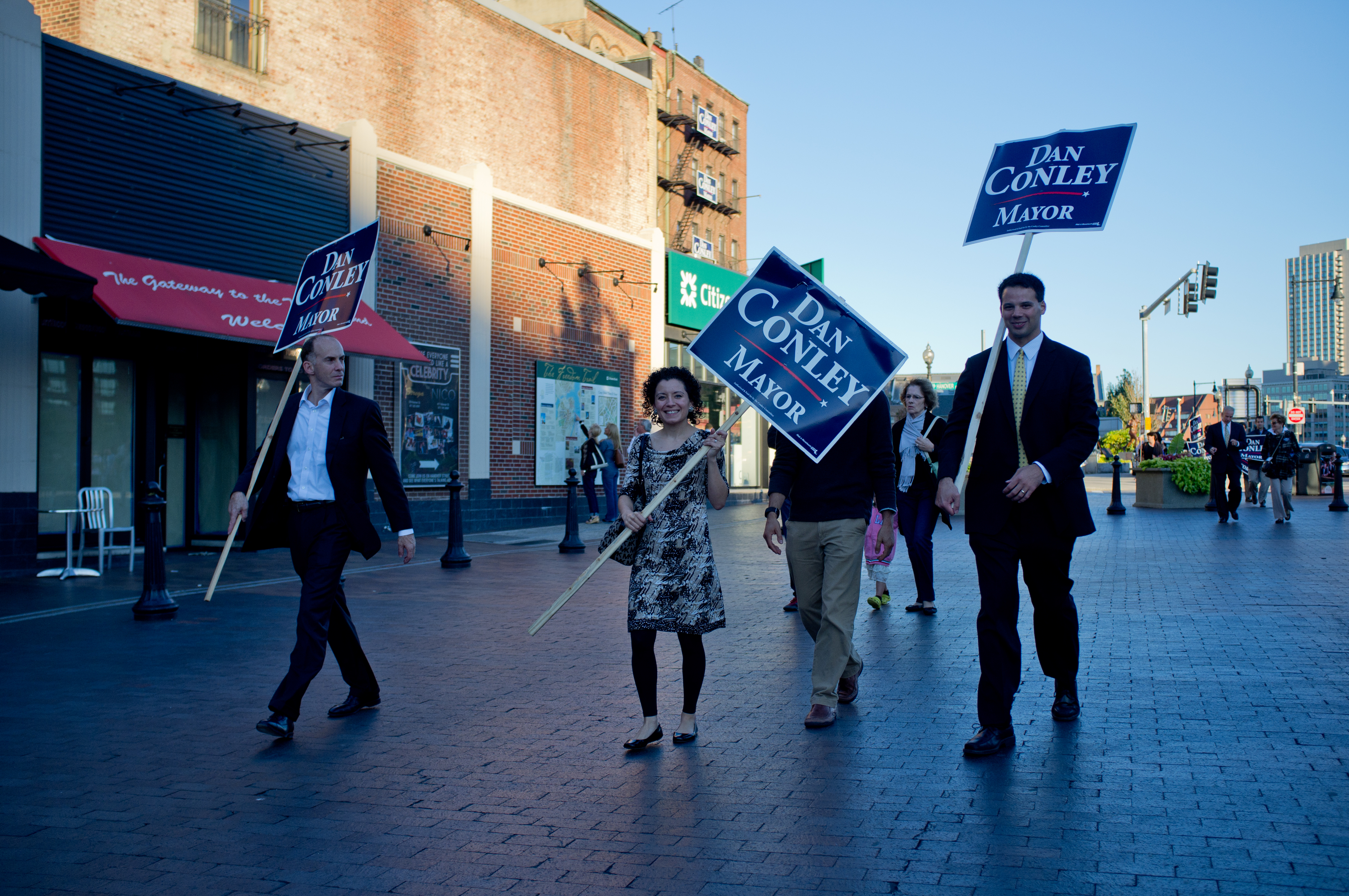
Supporters campaigning for Conley's mayoral bid

In April 2013, Conley announced that he was running in the 2013 Boston mayoral election. He entered the field as the best-financed candidate at the time, but placed fourth in a twelve candidate field winning 11.3% of the vote in the preliminary. After losing the mayoral election, Conley continued to hold the office as district Attorney until 2018.

== Personal life ==
Conley resides in Boston with his wife and is the father of two adult children.
