= List of South End Press books =

The following is a list of South End Press books. Where books have been republished since the closure of South End Press in 2014, the new publisher is shown.

== Anthologies ==
- Color of Violence: The INCITE! Anthology by INCITE! Women of Color Against Violence
- Food for Our Grandmothers: Writings by Arab-American and Arab-Canadian Feminists, edited by Joanna Kadi, South End Press, 1994 ISBN 0-89608-489-2

== African American Studies ==
- We Want Freedom: A Life in the Black Panther Party by Mumia Abu-Jamal; Kathleen Cleaver (Introduction)
- When the Prisoners Ran Walpole: A True Story in the Movement for Prison Abolition by Jamie Bissonette
- Race and Resistance: African Americans in the Twenty-First Century by Herb Boyd (Editor)
- Another America: The Politics of Race and Blame by Kofi Buenor Hadjor
- Black Geographies and the Politics of Place by Katherine McKittrick (Editor) and Clyde Woods (Editor)
- Black Liberation in Conservative America by Manning Marable
- Black Looks: Race and Representation by bell hooks
- Breaking Bread: Insurgent Black Intellectual Life by bell hooks and Cornel West
- Breeding a Nation: Reproductive Slavery and the Pursuit of Freedom by Pamela D. Bridgewater
- Chain of Change: Struggles for Black Community Development by Mel King
- Color of Violence: The INCITE! Anthology by INCITE! Women of Color Against Violence
- Common Differences: Conflicts in Black and White Feminist Perspectives by Gloria Joseph and Jill Lewis
- Death Blossoms: Reflections from a Prisoner of Conscience by Mumia Abu-Jamal; Foreword by Cornel West, Introduction by Julia Wright
- Feminist Theory: From Margin to Center by bell hooks
- From Civil Rights to Black Liberation: Malcolm X and the Organization of Afro-American Unity by William W. Sales, Jr.
- Homegrown: Engaged Cultural Criticism by bell hooks and Amalia Mesa-Bains
- How Capitalism Underdeveloped Black America: Problems in Race, Political Economy, and Society by Manning Marable
- Incognegro: A Memoir of Exile and Apartheid by Frank B. Wilderson III, Duke University Press
- Our Enemies in Blue: Police and Power in America (Revised Edition) by Kristian Williams
- Outsiders Within: Writing on Transracial Adoption by Jane Jeong Trenka (Editor), Julia Chinyere Oparah (Editor), and Sun Yung Shin (Editor)
- Pipe Dream Blues: Racism and the War on Drugs by Clarence Lusane
- Race and Resistance: African Americans in the Twenty-First Century by Herb Boyd (Editor)
- Race in the Global Era: African Americans at the Millennium by Clarence Lusane; Julianne Malveaux (Foreword)
- The Revolution Starts at Home: Confronting Intimate Violence Within Activist Communities by Ching-In Chen (Editor), Jai Dulani (Editor), and Leah Lakshmi Piepzna-Samarasinha (Editor); Andrea Smith (preface)
- Sisters of the Yam: Black Women and Self-Recovery by bell hooks
- Sisters of the Yam: Black Women and Self-Recovery audio by bell hooks and Ayo Sesheni (Narrator)
- Talking Back: Thinking Feminist, Thinking Black by bell hooks
- What Lies Beneath: Katrina, Race, and the State of the Nation by South End Press Collective (editors); Afterword by Joy James
- Women Writing Resistance: Essays on Latin America and the Caribbean by Jennifer Browdy de Hernandez (Editor); Preface by Elizabeth Martínez

== Asian American Studies ==
- Soil Not Oil: Environmental Justice in an Age of Climate Crisis by Vandana Shiva
- Violence Every Day: Police Brutality and Racial Profiling Against Women, Girls, and Trans People of Color by Andrea J. Ritchie
- Color of Violence: The INCITE! Anthology by INCITE! Women of Color Against Violence
- Disposable Domestics: Immigrant Women Workers in the Global Factory by Grace Chang; Mimi Abramovitz (Foreword)
- Dragon Ladies: Asian American Feminists Breathe Fire by Sonia Shah (Editor); Yuri Kochiyama (Preface); Karin Aguilar-San Juan (Foreword)
- Islands in Captivity: The International Tribunal on the Rights of Indigenous Hawaiians by Ward Churchill (Editor) and Sharon H. Venne (Editor); Lilikala Kame'eleihiwa (Hawaiian language editor)
- Outsiders Within: Writing on Transracial Adoption by Jane Jeong Trenka (Editor), Julia Chinyere Oparah (Editor), and Sun Yung Shin (Editor)
- The Revolution Starts at Home: Confronting Intimate Violence Within Activist Communities by Ching-In Chen (Editor), Jai Dulani (Editor), and Leah Lakshmi Piepzna-Samarasinha (Editor); Andrea Smith (preface)
- The Shock of Arrival: Reflections on Postcolonial Experience by Meena Alexander
- Sovereign Acts by Frances Negrón-Muntaner
- The State of Asian America: Activism and Resistance in the 1990s by Karin Aguilar-San Juan (Editor); David Henry Hwang (Foreword)
- Sweatshop Warriors: Immigrant Women Workers Take On the Global Factory by Miriam Ching and Yoon Louie ISBN 9780896086395
- What Lies Beneath: Katrina, Race, and the State of the Nation by South End Press Collective (editors); Afterword by Joy James

== Critical Race Theory ==
- VIOLENCE EVERY DAY: Police Brutality and Racial Profiling Against Women, Girls, and Trans People of Color by Andrea J. Ritchie
- AMERICAN METHODS: Torture and the Logic of Domination by Kristian Williams
- Black Geographies and the Politics of Place by Katherine McKittrick (Editor) and Clyde Woods (Editor)
- Color of Violence: The INCITE! Anthology by INCITE! Women of Color Against Violence
- Conquest: Sexual Violence and American Indian Genocide, by Andrea Smith, Duke University Press
- Incognegro: A Memoir of Exile and Apartheid by Frank B. Wilderson III
- Outsiders Within: Writing on Transracial Adoption by Jane Jeong Trenka (Editor), Julia Chinyere Oparah (Editor), and Sun Yung Shin (Editor)
- Sisters of the Yam: Black Women and Self-Recovery by bell hooks
- Sovereign Acts by Frances Negrón-Muntaner
- What Lies Beneath: Katrina, Race, and the State of the Nation by South End Press Collective (editors); Afterword by Joy James
- Yearning: Race, Gender, and Cultural Politics by bell hooks

== Critical Theory ==
- Normal Life: Administrative Violence, Critical Trans Politics, and the Limits of Law by Dean Spade, Duke University Press
- The Revolution Will Not Be Funded: Beyond the Non-Profit Industrial Complex by INCITE! Women of Color Against Violence
- Sisters of the Yam: Black Women and Self-Recovery by bell hooks

== Cultural Studies ==
- American Methods: Torture and the Logic of Domination by Kristian Williams
- Beauty Secrets: Women and the Politics of Appearance by Wendy Chapkis
- Black Geographies and the Politics of Place by Katherine McKittrick (Editor) and Clyde Woods (Editor)
- Black Looks: Race and Representation by bell hooks
- Color of Violence: The INCITE! Anthology by INCITE! Women of Color Against Violence
- Common Differences: Conflicts in Black and White Feminist Perspectives by Gloria Joseph and Jill Lewis
- Culture and Resistance: Conversations with Edward W. Said by David Barsamian and Edward W. Said
- Dirty Gold: Indigenous Alliances to End Global Resource Colonialism by Al Gedicks
- Emma: A Play in Two Acts About Emma Goldman, American Anarchist by Howard Zinn
- Getting Off: Pornography and the End of Masculinity by Robert Jensen
- Homegrown: Engaged Cultural Criticism by bell hooks and Amalia Mesa-Bains
- I Looked Over Jordan: And Other Stories by Ernie Brill
- Incognegro: A Memoir of Exile and Apartheid by Frank B. Wilderson III
- Left Out: The Politics of Exclusion: Essays 1964–2002 by Martin Duberman
- Louder Than Bombs: Interviews from The Progressive Magazine by David Barsamian
- Marx in Soho: A Play on History by Howard Zinn
- Medicine Stories: History, Culture, and the Politics of Integrity by Aurora Levins Morales
- On the Border by Michel Warschawski
- Our Enemies in Blue: Police and Power in America by Kristian Williams
- Outsiders Within: Writing on Transracial Adoption by Jane Jeong Trenka (Editor), Julia Chinyere Oparah (Editor), and Sun Yung Shin (Editor)
- Playbook by Maxine Klein, Lydia Sargent, and Howard Zinn
- Recovering the Sacred: The Power of Naming and Claiming by Winona LaDuke
- Rockin' the Boat: Mass Music and Mass Movements by Reebee Garofalo (Editor)
- The Shock of Arrival: Reflections on Postcolonial Experience by Meena Alexander
- Signed, Sealed, and Delivered: True Life Stories of Women in Pop by Sue Steward and Sheryl Garratt
- Soul Clap Its Hands and Sing by Natalie Petesch
- Sovereign Acts by Frances Negrón-Muntaner
- Theatre for the 98% by Maxine Klein
- Voices of Resistance: Indigenous Radio and the Struggle for Social Justice in Colombia by Mario Murillo
- What Lies Beneath: Katrina, Race, and the State of the Nation by South End Press Collective (editors); Afterword by Joy James
- Women Writing Resistance: Essays on Latin America and the Caribbean by Jennifer Browdy de Hernandez (Editor); Preface by Elizabeth Martínez
- Yearning: Race, Gender, and Cultural Politics by bell hooks
- Zapata's Disciple: Essays by Martín Espada

== Declassified ==
- I Looked Over Jordan: And Other Stories by Ernie Brill
- Playbook by Maxine Klein, Lydia Sargent, and Howard Zinn

== Domestic Repression ==
- Violence Every Day: Police Brutality and Racial Profiling Against Women, Girls, and Trans People of Color by Andrea J. Ritchie
- Normal Life: Administrative Violence, Critical Trans Politics, and the Limits of Law by Dean Spade
- Agents of Repression: The FBI's Secret Wars Against the American Indian Movement and the Black Panther Party by Ward Churchill and Jim Vander Wall
- American Methods: Torture and the Logic of Domination by Kristian Williams
- The COINTELPRO Papers: Documents From the FBI's Secret Wars Against Dissent in the United States by Ward Churchill and Jim Vander Wall
- Dirty Gold: Indigenous Alliances to End Global Resource Colonialism by Al Gedicks
- How Nonviolence Protects the State by Peter Gelderloos
- Our Enemies in Blue: Police and Power in America (Revised Edition) by Kristian Williams
- Policing the National Body: Race, Gender and Criminalization by Jael Silliman (Editor) and Anannya Bhattacharjee (Editor); Angela Y. Davis (Foreword)
- What Lies Beneath: Katrina, Race, and the State of the Nation by South End Press Collective (editors); Afterword by Joy James
- When the Prisoners Ran Walpole: A True Story in the Movement for Prison Abolition by Jamie Bissonette

== Ecology and Green Politics ==
- Toolbox for Sustainable City Living: A Do-It-Ourselves Guide by Scott Kellogg and Stacy Pettigrew
- Staying Alive: Women, Ecology and Development by Vandana Shiva
- Biopiratería: El Saqueo de la Naturaleza y del Conocimiento by Vandana Shiva
- Biopiracy: The Plunder of Nature and Knowledge by Vandana Shiva
- Soil Not Oil: Environmental Justice in an Age of Climate Crisis by Vandana Shiva
- All Our Relations: Native Struggles for Land and Life by Winona LaDuke
- ¡Cochabamba!: Water War in Bolivia by Oscar Olivera and Tom Lewis; Foreword by Vandana Shiva
- Confronting Environmental Racism: Voices from the Grassroots by Robert D. Bullard (Editor)
- Dangerous Intersections: Feminist Perspectives on Population, Environment, and Development by Jael Silliman (Editor) and Ynestra King (Editor)
- Defending the Earth: A Dialogue Between Murray Bookchin and Dave Foreman by Steve Chase (Editor), Murray Bookchin, and Dave Foreman
- Dirty Gold: Indigenous Alliances to End Global Resource Colonialism by Al Gedicks
- Dying From Dioxin: A Citizen's Guide to Reclaiming Our Health and Rebuilding Democracy by Lois Marie Gibbs
- Earth Democracy: Justice, Sustainability, and Peace by Vandana Shiva
- Earth for Sale: Reclaiming Ecology in the Age of Corporate Greenwash by Brian Tokar
- Ecological Democracy by Roy Morrison
- Fighting for Hope by Petra Kelly
- Las Guerras del Agua: Privatización, Contaminación y Lucro by Vandana Shiva
- Heat:How to Stop the Planet From Burning by George Monbiot
- Highway Robbery: Transportation Racism and New Routes to Equity by Robert D. Bullard (Editor), Glenn S. Johnson (Editor), and Angel O. Torres (Editor)
- Manifestos on the Future of Food and Seed by Vandana Shiva (Editor), Carlo Petrini (Contributor), and Michael Pollan (Contributor)
- The New Resource Wars: Native and Environmental Struggles Against Multinational Corporations by Al Gedicks; Winona LaDuke (Foreword)
- No Nukes: Everyone's Guide to Nuclear Power by Anna Gyorgy
- Power Politics by Arundhati Roy
- Recovering the Sacred: The Power of Naming and Claiming by Winona LaDuke
- Resource Rebels: Native Challenges to Mining and Oil Corporations by Al Gedicks
- Rethinking Ecofeminist Politics by Janet Biehl
- Stolen Harvest: The Hijacking of the Global Food Supply by Vandana Shiva
- The Sun Betrayed: A Report on the Corporate Seizure of U.S. Solar Energy Development by Ray Reece
- Water Wars: Privatization, Pollution, and Profit by Vandana Shiva

== Economics ==
- Toolbox for Sustainable City Living: A Do-It-Ourselves Guide by Scott Kellogg and Stacy Pettigrew
- Chaos or Community? Seeking Solutions, Not Scapegoats for Bad Economics by Holly Sklar
- Color of Violence: The INCITE! Anthology by INCITE! Women of Color Against Violence
- Economic Report of the People: An Alternative to the Economic Report of the President by Center for Popular Economics
- Fifty Years is Enough: The Case Against the World Bank and the International Monetary Fund by Kevin Danaher (Editor)
- Global Village or Global Pillage: Economic Reconstruction from the Bottom Up by Jeremy Brecher and Tim Costello
- Global Village or Global Pillage: How People Around the World Are Challenging Corporate Globalization by Jeremy Brecher, Tim Costello, and Brendan Smith; Edward Asner (Narrator)
- Globalization from Below: The Power of Solidarity by Jeremy Brecher, Tim Costello, and Brendan Smith
- Hazardous to Our Wealth: Economic Policies in the 1980s by Frank Ackerman
- Keeping Up With the Dow Joneses: Debt, Prison, Workfare by Vijay Prashad
- Leasing the Ivory Tower by Lawrence Soley
- Looking Forward: Participatory Economics for the Twenty-First Century by Michael Albert and Robin Hahnel
- Manifestos on the Future of Food and Seed by Vandana Shiva (Editor), Carlo Petrini (Contributor), and Michael Pollan (Contributor)
- Mink Coats Don't Trickle Down: The Economic Attack on Women and People of Color by Randy Albelda, Elaine McCrate, Edwin Meléndez, and June Lapidus
- Outsiders Within: Writing on Transracial Adoption by Jane Jeong Trenka (Editor), Julia Chinyere Oparah (Editor), and Sun Yung Shin (Editor)
- Panic Rules! Everything You Need to Know About the Global Economy by Robin Hahnel; Jeremy Brecher (Foreword)
- Private Interests, Public Spending: Balanced-Budget Conservatism and the Fiscal Crisis by Sidney Plotkin and William E. Scheuerman
- Raise the Floor: Wages and Policies that Work for All of Us by Holly Sklar and Laryssa Mykyta; Marie C. Wilson (Afterword)
- Reaganomics: Rhetoric vs. Reality by Frank Ackerman
- The Revolution Will Not Be Funded: Beyond the Non-Profit Industrial Complex by INCITE! Women of Color Against Violence
- Take the Rich Off Welfare by Mark Zepezauer
- What Lies Beneath: Katrina, Race, and the State of the Nation by South End Press Collective (editors); Afterword by Joy James

== Feminism ==
- Staying Alive: Women, Ecology and Development by Vandana Shiva
- Violence Every Day: Police Brutality and Racial Profiling Against Women, Girls, and Trans People of Color by Andrea J. Ritchie
- Normal Life: Administrative Violence, Critical Trans Politics, and the Limits of Law by Dean Spade
- In Kashmir: Gender, Militarization, and the Modern Nation-State by Seema Kazi
- Abortion without Apology: A Radical History for the 1990s by Ninia Baehr
- Ain't I a Woman: Black Women and Feminism by bell hooks
- American Methods: Torture and the Logic of Domination by Kristian Williams
- Bananeras: Women Transforming the Banana Unions of Latin America by Dana Frank
- Color of Violence: The INCITE! Anthology by INCITE! Women of Color Against Violence
- Common Differences: Conflicts in Black and White Feminist Perspectives by Gloria Joseph and Jill Lewis
- Conquest: Sexual Violence and American Indian Genocide by Andrea Smith
- Dangerous Intersections: Feminist Perspectives on Population, Environment, and Development by Jael Silliman (Editor) and Ynestra King (Editor)
- Feminism is For Everybody: Passionate Politics by bell hooks
- Feminist Theory: From Margin to Center by bell hooks
- Getting Off: Pornography and the End of Masculinity by Robert Jensen
- Glass Ceilings and Bottomless Pits: Women's Work, Women's Poverty by Randy Albelda and Chris Tilly
- Homegrown: Engaged Cultural Criticism by bell hooks and Amalia Mesa-Bains
- Manifestos on the Future of Food and Seed by Vandana Shiva (Editor), Carlo Petrini (Contributor), and Michael Pollan (Contributor)
- Outsiders Within: Writing on Transracial Adoption by Jane Jeong Trenka (Editor), Julia Chinyere Oparah (Editor), and Sun Yung Shin (Editor)
- The Revolution Starts at Home: Confronting Intimate Violence Within Activist Communities by Ching-In Chen (Editor), Jai Dulani (Editor), and Leah Lakshmi Piepzna-Samarasinha (Editor); Andrea Smith (preface)
- Sisters of the Yam: Black Women and Self-Recovery by bell hooks
- Sovereign Acts by Frances Negrón-Muntaner
- Talking Back: Thinking Feminist, Thinking Black by bell hooks
- Undivided Rights: Women of Color Organize for Reproductive Justice by Jael Silliman, Marlene Gerber Fried, Loretta Ross, and Elena Gutiérrez
- What Lies Beneath: Katrina, Race, and the State of the Nation by South End Press Collective (editors); Afterword by Joy James
- Women Writing Resistance: Essays on Latin America and the Caribbean by Jennifer Browdy de Hernandez (Editor); Preface by Elizabeth Martínez

== Gay, Lesbian, Bisexual and Transgender Studies ==
- Culture Clash: The Making of Gay Sensibility by Michael Bronski
- Exile and Pride:Disability, Queerness, and Liberation by Eli Clare, Duke University Press

== Gender and Sexuality ==
- Normal Life: Administrative Violence, Critical Trans Politics and the Limits of Law, by Dean Spade

== Globalization ==
- Staying Alive: Women, Ecology and Development, by Vandana Shiva

== Health ==
- Toolbox for Sustainable City Living: A do-it-Ourselves Guide, Scott Kellogg and Stacy Pettigrew

== Politics/International Affairs ==
- The Washington Connection and Third World Fascism, Noam Chomsky and Edward S. Herman
