= Massachusetts House of Representatives' 9th Suffolk district =

American legislative district

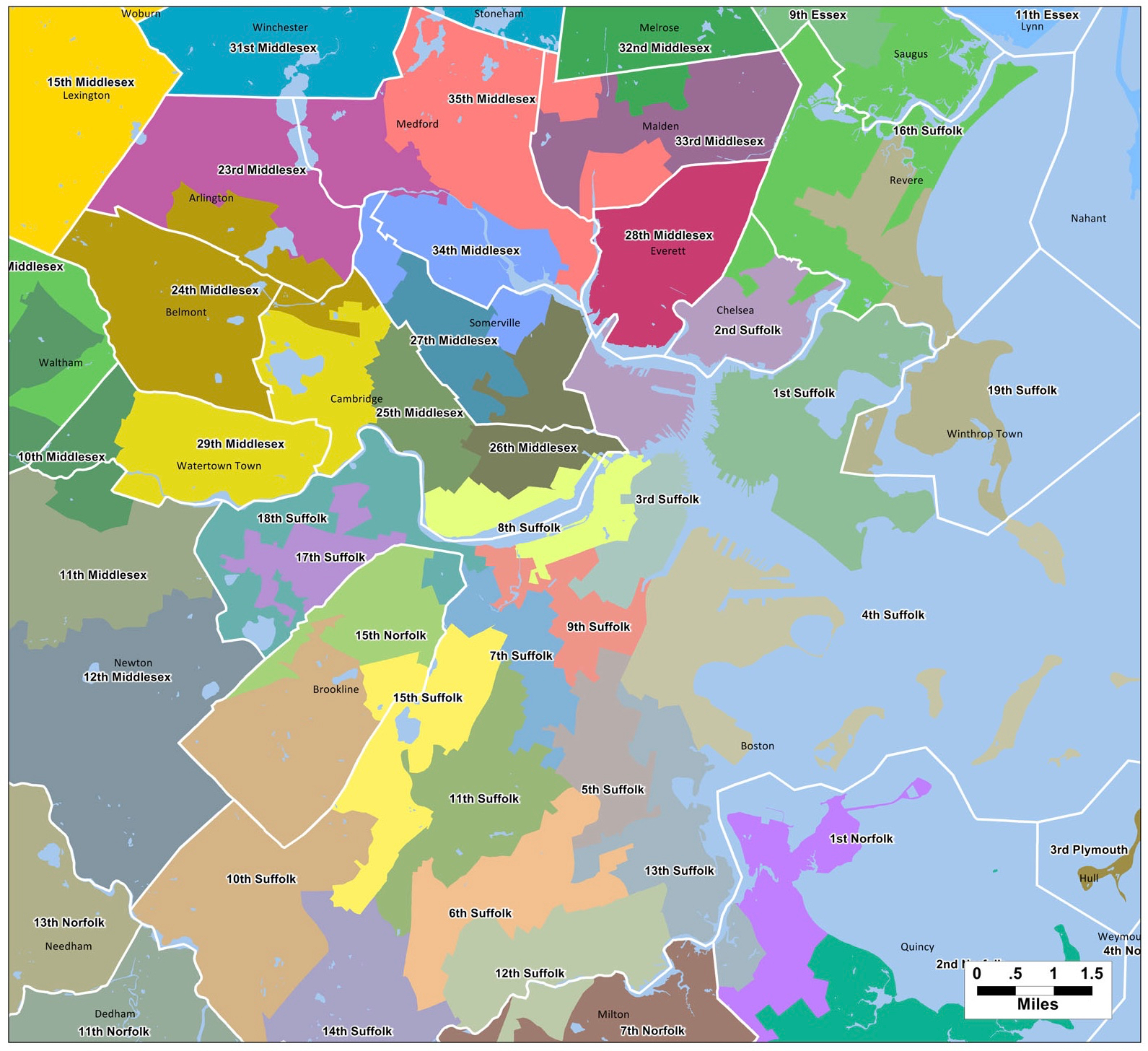
Map of Massachusetts House of Representatives districts for Suffolk County, apportioned in 2011

Massachusetts House of Representatives' 9th Suffolk district in the United States is one of 160 legislative districts included in the lower house of the Massachusetts General Court. It covers part of the city of Boston in Suffolk County. Democrat John F. Moran of the South End has represented the district since 2023.

The current district geographic boundary overlaps with those of the Massachusetts Senate's 2nd Suffolk district and 2nd Suffolk and Middlesex district.

== Representatives ==
- William Beck, circa 1858
- Franklin H. Sprague, circa 1858
- Thomas D. Morris, circa 1859
- Alexander H. Twombly, circa 1859
- Julius Caesar Chappelle, 1883-1886
- Henry Parkman, (1886–1888)
- William Oscar Armstrong, (1887–1888)
- Frank Morrison (1889–????)
- Andrew Berkley Lattimore (1889–1890)
- William P. Hickey, circa 1920
- John Gleason
- Michael Ward
- William J. Manning, circa 1920
- Laurence H. Banks, 1940s
- Dennis Glynn
- William A. Glynn, circa 1951

Member	Party	Years	Legis.	Electoral history	District map
[data missing]		1955– 1957	160th	[data missing]	
Lincoln Pope Jr.	Democratic	1957–1965	161st 162nd 163th 164th	Elected in 1956. Re-elected in 1958. Re-elected in 1960. Re-elected in 1962.	1957–65: Ward 9 (Roxbury)
Robert H. Quinn	Democratic	1965– 1969	165th 166th	Re-districted from 12th Suffolk. Re-elected in 1964. Re-elected in 1966. Elected Attorney General in 1968.	1965–69: Ward 13 (Dorchester)
James F. Hart	Democratic	May 20, 1969 – January 2, 1973	167th 168th	Won special election in 1969. Re-elected in 1970. Lost primary in 1972.	1969–75: Ward 13 (Dorchester)
Richard F. Finnigan	Democratic	January 3, 1973 – January 2, 1975	169th	Elected in 1972. Re-districted to 14th Suffolk.	1969–75: Ward 13 (Dorchester)
Doris Bunte	Democratic	January 3, 1975 – January 2, 1979	170th 171st	Re-districted from 7th Suffolk. Re-elected in 1974. Re-elected in 1976. Re-districted to 4th Suffolk.	1975–79:
Mel King	Democratic	January 3, 1979 – January 2, 1983	172nd 173rd	Redistricted from 4th Suffolk. Re-elected in 1978. Re-elected in 1980. Retired to run for mayor.	1979–83:
Byron Rushing	Democratic	January 2, 1983 – January 2, 2019	174th 174th 175th 176th 177th 178th 179th 180th 181st 182nd 183rd 184th 185th 186th 187th 188th 189th 190th 191st	Elected in 1982; Re-elected in 1984. Re-elected in 1986. Re-elected in 1988. Re-elected in 1990. Re-elected in 1992. Re-elected in 1996. Re-elected in 1998. Re-elected in 2000. Re-elected in 2002. Re-elected in 2004. Re-elected in 2006. Re-elected in 2008. Re-elected in 2010. Re-elected in 2012. Re-elected in 2014. Re-elected in 2016. Lost primary in 2018.	1983–93:
Byron Rushing	Democratic	January 2, 1983 – January 2, 2019	174th 174th 175th 176th 177th 178th 179th 180th 181st 182nd 183rd 184th 185th 186th 187th 188th 189th 190th 191st	Elected in 1982; Re-elected in 1984. Re-elected in 1986. Re-elected in 1988. Re-elected in 1990. Re-elected in 1992. Re-elected in 1996. Re-elected in 1998. Re-elected in 2000. Re-elected in 2002. Re-elected in 2004. Re-elected in 2006. Re-elected in 2008. Re-elected in 2010. Re-elected in 2012. Re-elected in 2014. Re-elected in 2016. Lost primary in 2018.	1993–2003:
Byron Rushing	Democratic	January 2, 1983 – January 2, 2019	174th 174th 175th 176th 177th 178th 179th 180th 181st 182nd 183rd 184th 185th 186th 187th 188th 189th 190th 191st	Elected in 1982; Re-elected in 1984. Re-elected in 1986. Re-elected in 1988. Re-elected in 1990. Re-elected in 1992. Re-elected in 1996. Re-elected in 1998. Re-elected in 2000. Re-elected in 2002. Re-elected in 2004. Re-elected in 2006. Re-elected in 2008. Re-elected in 2010. Re-elected in 2012. Re-elected in 2014. Re-elected in 2016. Lost primary in 2018.	2013–23:
Jon Santiago	Democratic	January 2, 2019 – March 1, 2023	192nd 193rd 194th	Elected in 2018. Re-elected in 2020. Re-elected in 2022. Retired to serve as Massachusetts Secretary of Veterans' Services.	2013–23:
Jon Santiago	Democratic	January 2, 2019 – March 1, 2023	192nd 193rd 194th	Elected in 2018. Re-elected in 2020. Re-elected in 2022. Retired to serve as Massachusetts Secretary of Veterans' Services.	2013–23:
John F. Moran	Democratic	June 7, 2023 – Present	194th	Elected in a special election in 2023.	2023–2033:

== See also ==
- List of Massachusetts House of Representatives elections
- Other Suffolk County districts of the Massachusetts House of Representatives: 1st, 2nd, 3rd, 4th, 5th, 6th, 7th, 8th, 10th, 11th, 12th, 13th, 14th, 15th, 16th, 17th, 18th, 19th
- List of Massachusetts General Courts
- List of former districts of the Massachusetts House of Representatives

== Images ==
Portraits of legislators

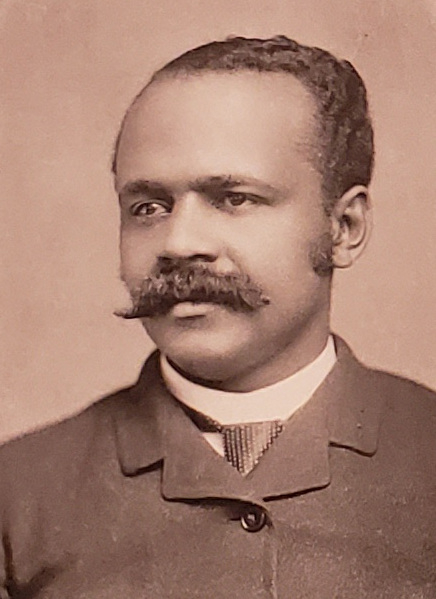
Julius Caesar Chappelle

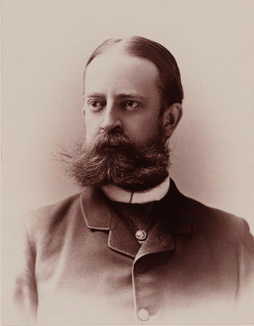
Henry Parkman

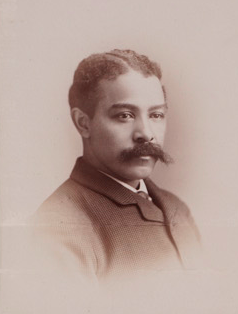
William Oscar Armstrong

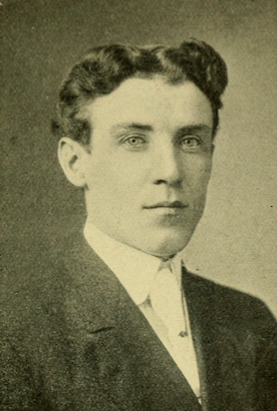
Daniel L. Sullivan

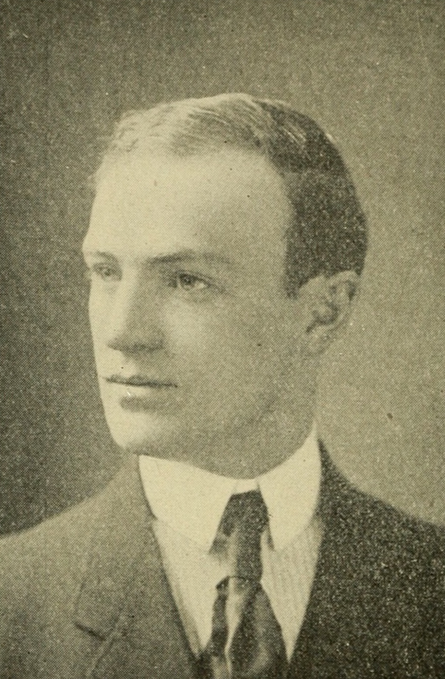
Timothy Callahan

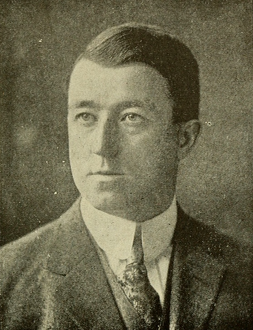
William Foley

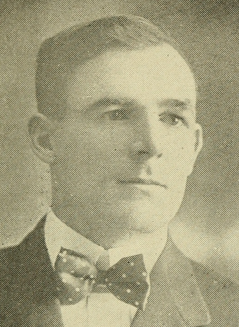
William Manning

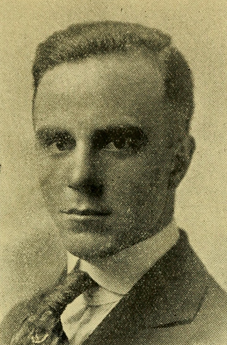
Joseph Toomey

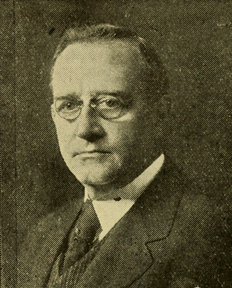
William Hickey

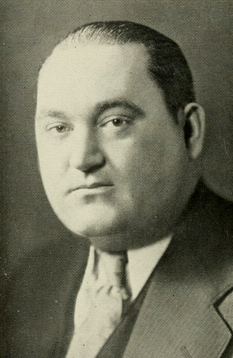
John Gleason

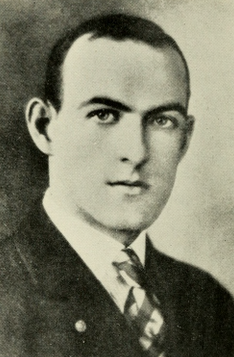
Michael Ward

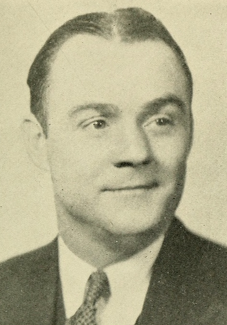
Dennis Glynn

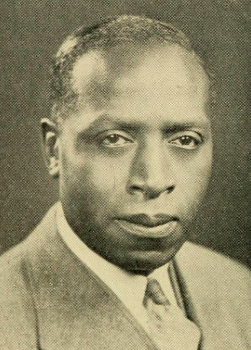
Laurence H. Banks

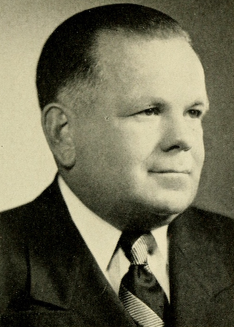
William Glynn

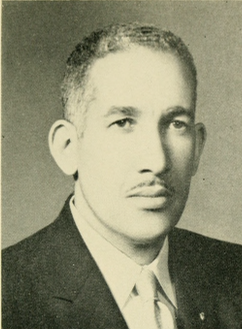
Lincoln Pope

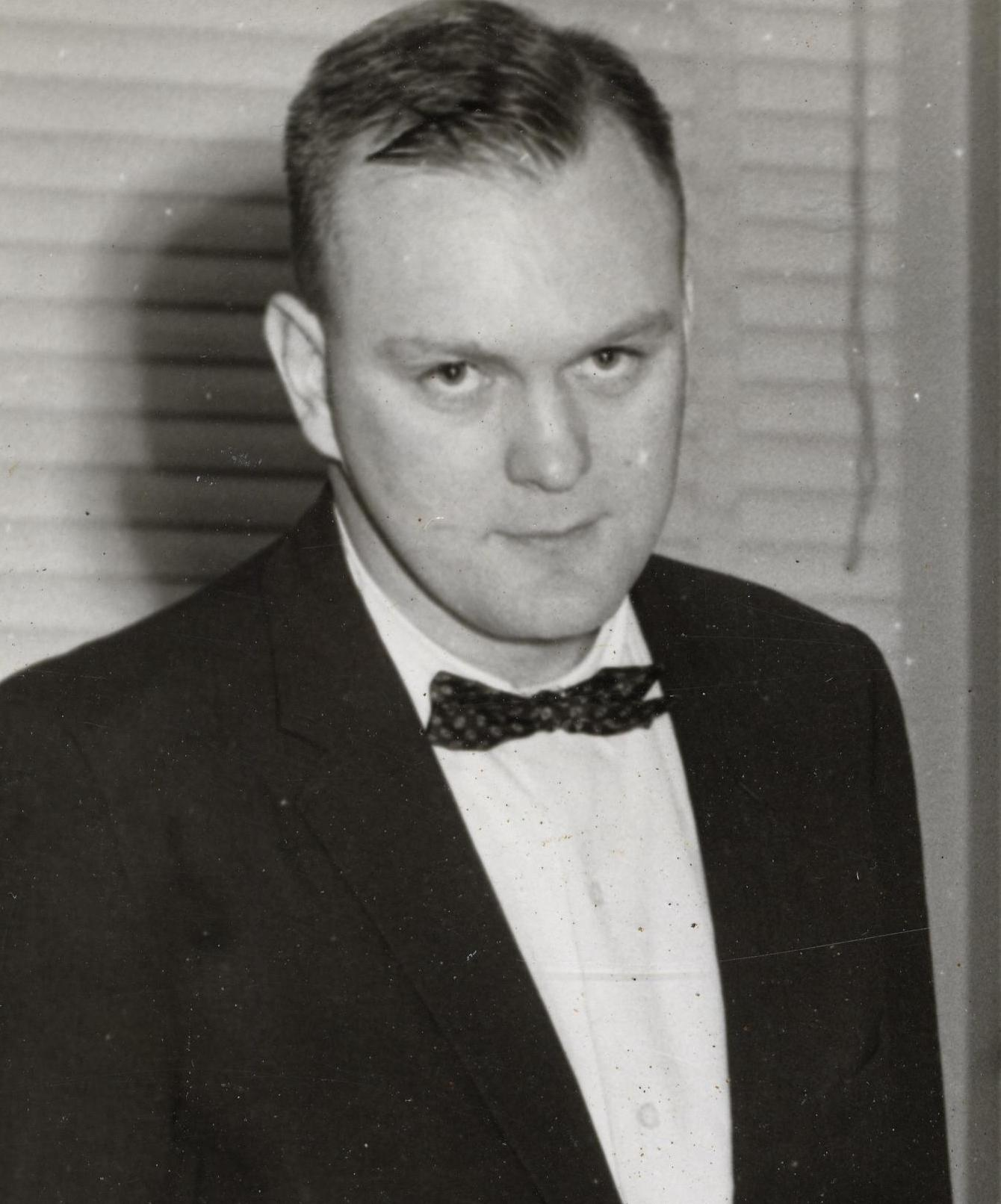
Robert Quinn

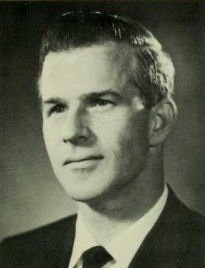
James F. Hart

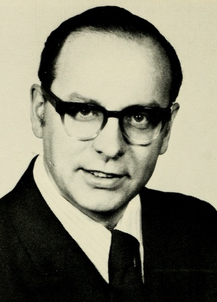
Richard Finnigan

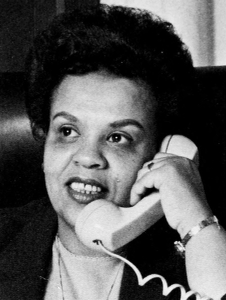
Doris Bunte

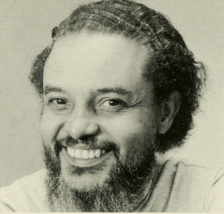
Byron Rushing

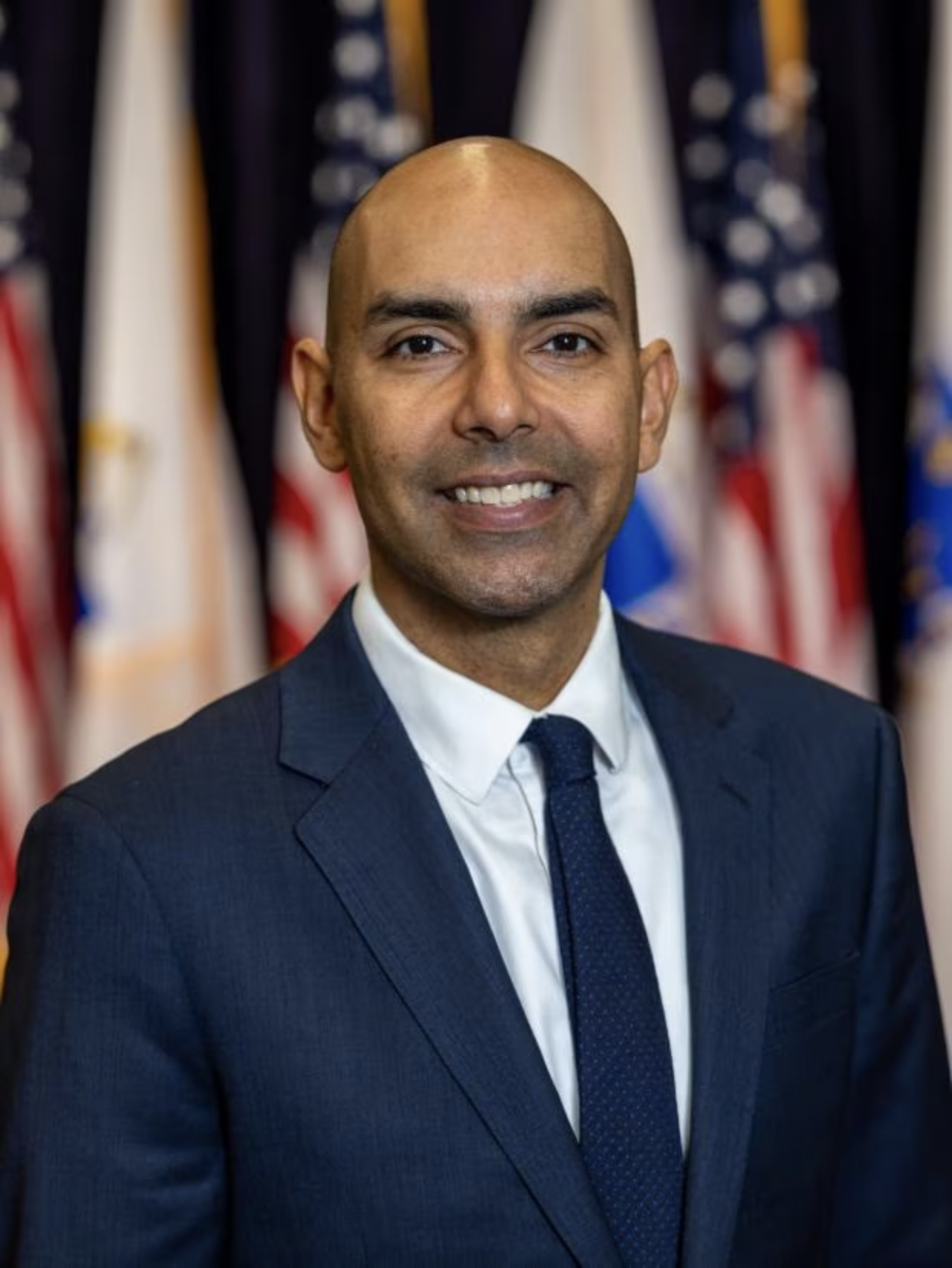
Jon Santiago

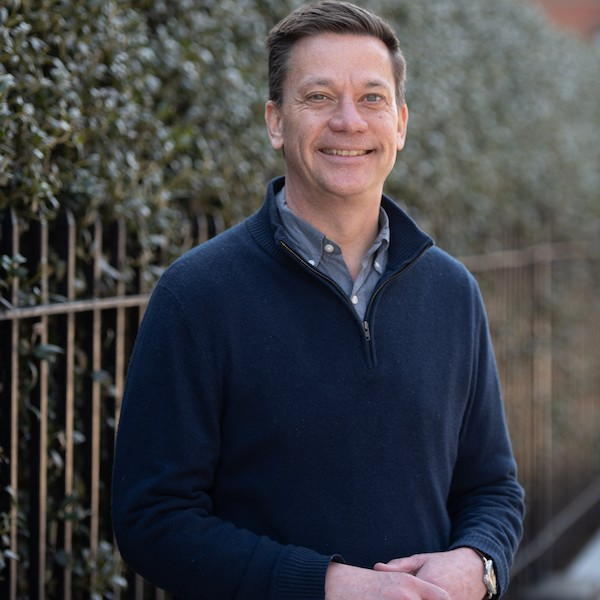
John F. Moran
