= Mel King =

American politician (1928–2023)

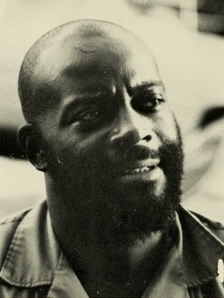
- King circa 1975

Member of the Massachusetts House of Representatives
- In office January 3, 1973 – January 2, 1983
- Preceded by: Doris Bunte
- Succeeded by: Byron Rushing
- Constituency: 4th Suffolk(1973–1979); 9th Suffolk (1979–1983)

Personal details
- Born: Melvin Herbert King; October 20, 1928 Boston, Massachusetts, US
- Died: March 28, 2023 (aged 94) Boston, Massachusetts, U.S.
- Party: Democratic
- Spouse: Joyce King (m. 1951)
- Children: 6
- Education: Claflin College; Boston State College

Melvin Herbert King (October 20, 1928 – March 28, 2023) was an American politician, community organizer, and educator. In 1973, King was elected as a member of the Massachusetts House of Representatives' 9th Suffolk district, a post he held until early 1983. King was the runner-up in the 1983 Boston mayoral election, against Raymond Flynn.

King, a lifelong resident of South End neighborhood of Boston, was active in creating community programs and institutions for low-income people in the city, and was the founder of the South End Technology Center. At the time of his death, he held the position of Senior Lecturer Emeritus at the Massachusetts Institute of Technology in their Department of Urban Studies and Planning.

== Early years ==
King's mother, Ursula, was born in Guyana, and his father, Watts King, in Barbados. His parents met and married in Nova Scotia and immigrated to Boston in the early 1920s. Born in the South End neighborhood, King was one of eleven children, only nine of whom survived past infancy. He graduated from Boston Technical High School in 1946 and then from Claflin College in Orangeburg, South Carolina in 1950 with a Bachelor of Science degree in mathematics. While at Claflin, he was initiated into Alpha Phi Alpha fraternity. In 1951, he received a Master of Arts degree in education from Boston State College, and then taught math, first at Boston Trade High School and at his alma mater, Boston Technical High School.

In 1953, King left the classroom to work with at-risk students, becoming Director of Boy's Work at Lincoln House, a settlement house in the South End. He continued doing community work, focusing on street-corner gangs as Youth Director at the United South End Settlements (USES). King also worked as a community activist, as well as an urban renewal and anti-poverty organizer. He was fired by USES when he promoted neighborhood control over government control, but was later rehired after community protests over his firing and was given the job of community organizer. King then founded the Community Assembly for a United South End (C.A.U.S.E.) to give tenants and community residents a voice.

== Political activities ==
=== Activism ===
In 1967, King became the director of the New Urban League of Greater Boston. He brought job training for the unemployed and organized the community around public school, employment, and human services delivery issues. In 2003, King created The New Majority – an organization and program uniting Boston's communities of color– Blacks, Hispanics, Asians, and Native Americans – uniting them around candidates for elective office.

==== Boston Redevelopment Authority protests and Tent City ====
In 1968, King helped organize a sit-in at the Boston Redevelopment Authority (BRA) office on April 25 in protest of a planned parking garage that was going to be built at the corner of Dartmouth and Columbus Streets in the South End, a site where housing had been leveled. The next morning, King organized an occupation of the lot.

For the next three days, while facing police retaliation, from 100 to 400 people occupied the lot. They built tents and wooden shanties and put up a large sign welcoming the media and visitors to "Tent City." Celtics legend Bill Russell, who owned a South End restaurant, provided food for the protestors. The story received extensive coverage in the local media. In honor of the demonstration, when a housing complex at that site was dedicated on April 30, 1988, it was named "Tent City." King told reporters that the key to the project was convincing ordinary Bostonians that they had to play a role in the development of their neighborhood.

=== Boston School Committee campaigns ===
King ran three times for a seat on the Boston School Committee in 1961, 1963, and 1965, unsuccessfully.

=== State representative ===
In 1973, King was elected to the Massachusetts House of Representatives for the 4th Suffolk district; he served until 1982. He was redistricted to the 9th Suffolk district in 1978.

=== 1979 mayoral election ===
In 1979, King ran for mayor for the first time. He finished third in the preliminary election and was eliminated.

=== 1983 mayoral campaign ===
In 1983, when the incumbent Mayor of Boston, Kevin White, withdrew from contention after 16 years in office, Mel King ran for mayor, the first African-American to run in a final election bid for mayor of Boston, and ultimately against Raymond Flynn. Though King secured the African American vote by wide margins and significant support among other ethnic groups, King ultimately lost to Flynn, an Irish-Catholic with roots in South Boston.

Both King and Flynn had originally been viewed as underdogs in the primary election. King's campaign relied heavily on volunteers, as did the campaign of Flynn. King's campaign came in a year where Black candidates in other cities had enjoyed success. This included the election of Harold Washington in Chicago.

King and Flynn had known each other since childhood, meeting through both playing basketball, and had both served as state representatives at the same time and worked together there on legislation. They had a lifelong friendship, despite being electoral opponents.

=== Rainbow Coalition/Green-Rainbow Party ===
King founded the Rainbow Coalition Party in Massachusetts in 1997. The term "rainbow coalition" had been used to describe coalitions which brought together a variety of demographic groups (including multiple ethnicities) into a political coalition. King had used it to describe his coalition of support during his 1983 mayoral campaign, preceding the Jesse Jackson presidential campaign the next year. In 2002, the Rainbow Coalition Party merged with the Massachusetts Green Party to become the Green-Rainbow Party, the Massachusetts affiliate of the Green Party of the United States.

In 2002, King supported Green-Rainbow Party nominee Jill Stein for governor of Massachusetts, saying "Jill Stein is the only candidate who will speak truth to power...She's the only one that makes issues of racism and social justice integral parts of her campaign.

King remained active as a member of the Green-Rainbow Party. In 2014, he was the campaign manager for the Green-Rainbow Party candidate for State Auditor, M. K. Merelice. He also supported the candidacies of other Green-Rainbow Party candidates; Danny Factor for Secretary of the Commonwealth and Ian Jackson for Treasurer.

=== Endorsements of candidacies ===
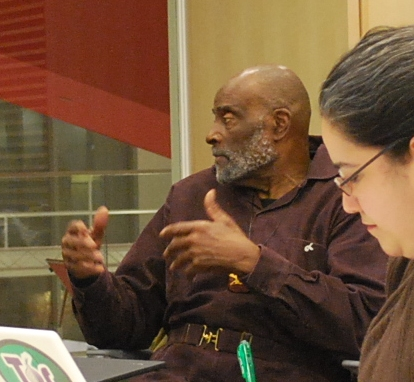
King speaking in 2010

During the 2000 presidential election, King endorsed the presidential campaign of Ralph Nader.

King endorsed Boston City Council at-large member Sam Yoon for mayor on August 10, 2009. King praised Yoon's vision, his collaborative approach and his focus on improving the educational system in Boston.

King endorsed Rep. Marty Walsh for mayor in his 2013 race against Boston City Councilor John Connolly.

King gave a last-minute endorsement to acting mayor Kim Janey before the primary of the 2021 Boston mayoral election.

== The Mel King Institute ==
The Mel King Institute for Community Building was formed in 2009 by the Massachusetts Association of Community Development Corporations (MACDC) and Local Initiatives Support Corporation (LISC) Boston, a nonprofit that supports affordable housing and community development. It is a training center and information clearinghouse for community development practitioners.

== Academic work ==
In 1970, King created the Community Fellows Program (CFP) in the Department of Urban Studies and Planning at MIT. He served as an adjunct professor of Urban Studies and Planning and director of the Community Fellows Program for twenty-five years until 1996. CFP, a nine-month-long program brought community organizers and leaders from across America to reflect, research, and study urban community politics, economics, social life, education, housing, and media.

In 1981, King's book, Chain of Change: Struggles for Black Community Development was published by South End Press. It focused on development in housing, education, employment and politics in Boston from the 1950s through the 1970s. Inspired by young activists, King reprinted Chain of Change in 2018.

In addition to writing Chain of Change and journal articles, King also used poetry to share his messages.

== Later years and death ==
Upon his retirement from MIT, King established the South End Technology Center to provide computer training for low-income people.

In 2021, an intersection in Boston's South End was named the "Melvin H. 'Mel' King Square" in his honor.

King died at his home in Boston's South End on March 28, 2023, at the age of 94. He was survived by his wife, the former Joyce Kenion, whom he married in 1951.

== See also ==
- 1973–1974 Massachusetts legislature
- 1975–1976 Massachusetts legislature
