= 2021 Boston mayoral election =

Election in Massachusetts, United States

- November 2, 2021
- Turnout: 32.66% ▲4.86 pp
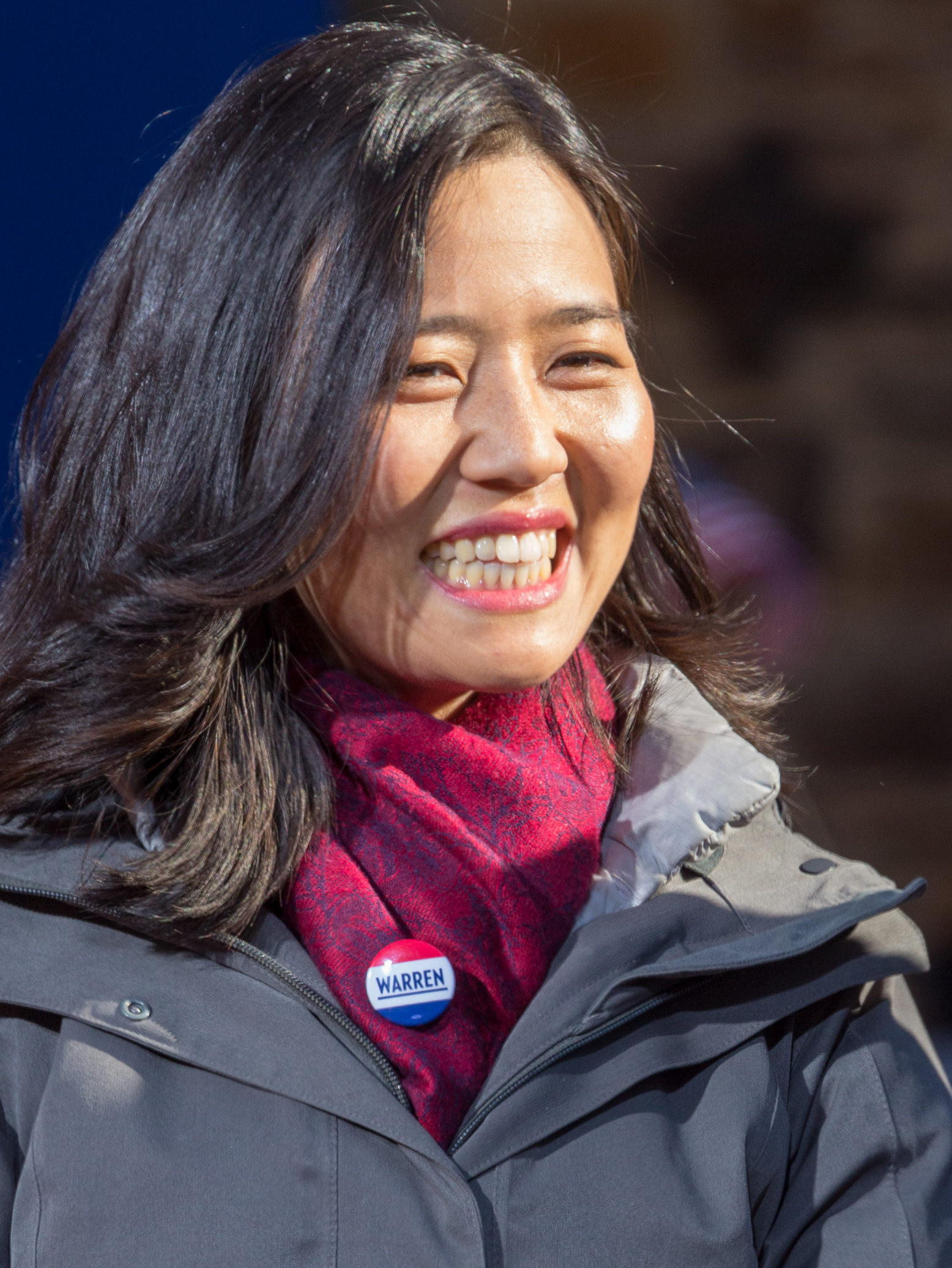

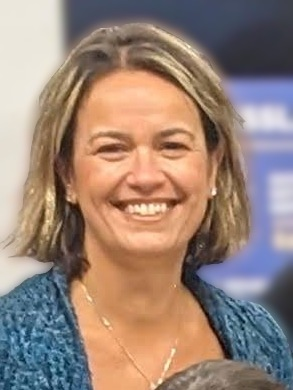
Candidate	Michelle Wu	Annissa Essaibi George
Party	Nonpartisan	Nonpartisan
Popular vote	91,239	50,879
Percentage	64.0%	35.6%
- Wu: 50–60% 60–70% 70–80% 80–90% >90% Essaibi George: 50–60% 60–70% 70–80% 80–90%
Mayor before election
Kim Janey (acting)
Elected mayor
Michelle Wu

The 2021 Boston mayoral election was held on November 2, 2021, to elect the mayor of Boston, Massachusetts. Incumbent mayor Marty Walsh was eligible to seek a third term. However, he resigned as mayor on March 22, 2021, after being confirmed as secretary of labor in the Cabinet of Joe Biden. This left the Boston City Council president, at the time Kim Janey, to hold the role of acting mayor until the victor of the election would take office.

Since more than two candidates qualified for the ballot, a non-partisan (Note: By law, all local elections in the City of Boston are non-partisan.) preliminary election was held on September 14 in order to determine which two candidates would advance to the general election. On the morning of September 15, the counting of ballots reached 100% reporting with Michelle Wu as the first-place winner and Annissa Essaibi George in a second place. As the two top vote-getters, they advanced to face each other in the general election. Wu won the general election on November 2 by 28 points, with her victory making her both the first woman and person of color to be elected as mayor of Boston. (Note: Incumbent Kim Janey served only as "acting mayor") The total number of votes cast for Wu in the general election was greater than for any mayoral candidate since 1983.

To advance to the general election, Wu and Essaibi George (both at-large city councilors) outperformed Andrea Campbell (a district city councilor), Kim Janey (acting mayor and district councilor), and John Barros (the city's former chief of economic development) in the nonpartisan primary.

== Logistics ==
=== Elimination of a potential special election ===
In early 2021, incumbent mayor Marty Walsh was expected to resign to take the United States Secretary of Labor position. His date of leaving office would normally determine if the city would be required to hold a special election for the remainder of his term, or if the acting mayor would serve the remainder of his term. The Boston City Charter requires that a special election be held for the office of mayor when a vacancy occurs "within sixteen months after a regular municipal election". As Boston held a municipal election on November 5, 2019, a 16-month window from that election extended until March 5, 2021. Thus, if Walsh had left his position as mayor before then, a special election to fill the remainder of his term would have normally been required, per the city charter.

Ricardo Arroyo of the Boston City Council proposed that the city charter requirement for a special election be overridden; such an override requires approval from Boston's city council and mayor, followed by approval by the state legislature and governor. The city council approved a home rule petition, which would dispense with the special election, on February 3; it was subsequently signed by mayor Walsh. The petition next required approval from the state legislature (where it was filed as HD 1757, "An Act Relative to the Office of the Mayor of the City of Boston") and governor. It passed in the Massachusetts House of Representatives on February 22, the Massachusetts Senate on February 25, and was signed by governor Charlie Baker on February 26, thus eliminating the need for a special election if Walsh vacated his office as mayor before March 5. As Walsh was still in office through that date, with his confirmation pending with the U.S. Senate, any consideration of a special election became moot. Walsh ultimately resigned as mayor on March 22, 2021, the same day that he was confirmed to his cabinet role.

=== Postal voting ===
In the summer of 2021, state lawmakers temporarily extended a COVID-19 pandemic-related voting reform allowing voters to request no-excuse mail-in ballots and to return them through either the mail or through ballot drop boxes.

=== Rescheduling of preliminary election ===
In late April, the Boston City Council approved moving the date of the preliminary municipal election (Note: The preliminary municipal election will also be used for applicable contests in the 2021 Boston City Council election.) from September 21 to September 14. The rationale for doing so was that it would grant officials an additional week to distribute mail-in voting ballots ahead of the November general election, since such ballots could not be printed until after the results of the preliminary election were certified, thereby determining which candidates would advance to the November general election ballot. The date change ordinance was signed two weeks later by Acting Mayor Kim Janey, making the change official.

=== Date of swearing-in ===
Because of the vacancy in office, the Boston City Charter stipulated that the winner of the mayoral election will be sworn in as soon as is conveniently possible once the results of the general election are certified. On September 24, 2021, Acting Mayor Kim Janey and general election candidates Annissa Essaibi George and Michelle Wu mutually reached an agreement for November 16 to be the tentative date for the new mayor to be sworn in.

== Candidates ==
To appear on the ballot, candidates were required to file nomination papers at Boston City Hall by 5:00 p.m. on May 18 with 3,000 certified signatures of registered voters. Eight candidates were certified to appear on the ballot in the preliminary election of September 14.

While the election had a nonpartisan ballot, all of the major candidates had publicly identified themselves as Democrats. All of the major candidates were people of color and four of the major candidates were women (notable, since Boston voters had never before elected a woman or a person of color to the city's mayoralty).

=== Advanced to general election ===
Candidate		Announced
Annissa Essaibi George	Boston city councilor at-large since 2016 Former teacher and businesswoman	January 28, 2021 (Website)
Michelle Wu	Boston city councilor at-large since 2014 Former president of the Boston City Council (2016–2018)	September 15, 2020 (Website)

=== Eliminated in preliminary election ===
Candidate		Announced
John Barros	Former chief of economic development for the City of Boston (2014–2021) Former Boston School Committee member (2010–2013); Candidate for mayor of Boston in 2013	March 4, 2021 (Website)
Andrea Campbell	Boston city councilor from 4th district since 2016 Former president of the Boston City Council (2018–2020)	September 24, 2020 (Website)
Kim Janey	Acting Mayor of Boston since 2021 Boston city councilor from 7th district since 2018	April 6, 2021 (Website)

- Robert Cappucci, former member of the Boston School Committee, and candidate for mayor in 2013 and 2017
- Richard Spagnuolo

=== Did not make ballot ===
- Michael J Bianchi II, candidate for Boston City Council District 9
- Joao DePina, businessman
- Roy Owens, perennial candidate
- Patrick Williams, candidate for Boston City Council at-large and Boston City Council District 3

=== Withdrew before preliminary election ===
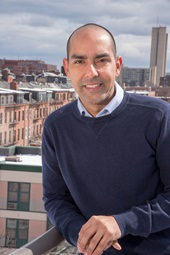
Jon Santiago withdrew his candidacy before the preliminary, and endorsed Janey. However, his name still appeared on the ballot.

- Dana Depelteau, former hotel manager
- Jon Santiago, state representative (endorsed Janey, still appeared on ballot)

=== Declined ===
- Ricardo Arroyo, Boston city councilor (ran for re-election, endorsed Janey, then Wu)
- Kenzie Bok, Boston city councilor (ran for re-election)
- Sonia Chang-Díaz, state senator (ran for governor and endorsed Wu)
- Nick Collins, state senator
- John R. Connolly, at-large member of the Boston City Council (2008–2014); candidate for mayor of Boston in the 2013 Boston mayoral election
- Karilyn Crockett, former chief of equity for the City of Boston
- Linda Dorcena Forry, former state senator
- Lydia Edwards, Boston city councilor (ran for re-election and State Senate; endorsed Wu)
- Nika Elugardo, state representative (endorsed Janey)
- Michael F. Flaherty, Boston city councilor at-large and former candidate in the 2009 Boston mayoral election (ran for re-election)
- Ed Flynn, Boston city councilor (ran for re-election)
- Althea Garrison, former Boston city councilor at-large, state representative, and perennial candidate (ran for City Council at-large)
- William G. Gross, former Boston Police commissioner (endorsed Essaibi George)
- Russell Holmes, state representative
- Segun Idowu, executive director of the Black Economic Council of Massachusetts
- Marty Martinez, chief of health and human services for the City of Boston
- Julia Mejia, Boston city councilor at-large (ran for re-election)
- Aaron Michlewitz, state representative (endorsed Santiago, then Wu)
- Matt O'Malley, outgoing Boston city councilor and president pro tempore of the Boston City Council
- Carmen Ortiz, former U.S. attorney for the District of Massachusetts
- Rachael Rollins, Suffolk County district attorney
- Michael F. Rush, state senator
- Tanisha Sullivan, president of the Boston NAACP
- Steven W. Tompkins, Suffolk County sheriff (endorsed Wu)
- Marty Walsh, mayor of Boston 2014–2021; resigned upon being confirmed as United States secretary of labor

== Primary ==
=== Campaign ===
The first two major candidates to enter the race were at-large City Councillor Michelle Wu, followed by District 4 City Councillor Andrea Campbell. Both announced their runs in September 2020, while incumbent Mayor Marty Walsh was still considered a likely candidate for re-election.

On January 7, 2021, President-elect Joe Biden designated Walsh to be his nominee for secretary of labor, changing the dynamics of the race, as, if confirmed, Walsh would vacate the mayoralty and make the election an open-race. Walsh was ultimately confirmed in March, making Kim Janey acting mayor. Following the announcement of Walsh's nomination, city official John Barros, At-large Councillor Annissa Essaibi George, and state representative Jon Santiago announced their candidacies. After becoming acting mayor following Walsh's confirmation, Kim Janey announced her candidacy. Santiago withdrew from the race on July 13, with CommonWealth Magazine citing poor poll numbers and difficulty in building a field organization as his probable reasons for doing so.

Writing on the primary election race, Ellen Barry of the New York Times called it "a departure" from the norm that the 2021 election has focused primarily on policy, rather than the candidates focusing on winning over particular racial/ethnic groups, remarking, "Boston's campaigns have long turned on ethnic rivalries, first between Anglo-Protestants and Irish Catholics, then drawing in racial minorities as those populations increased." James Pindell of The Boston Globe wrote that some of the top topics debated in the primary were, "public schools, housing, development, policing, climate resiliency, drug usage, and mental health".

Janey's campaign suffered a blow in early August when she expressed opposition to COVID-19 vaccine passports, likening them to slavery and birtherism. Janey's remarks drew criticism from elected officials and her fellow candidates, and caused her to drop in the polls. Campell was particularly assertive in her criticism of Janey's comments, accusing her of endangering public health.

By early September, news sources largely considered Wu to have established herself in polls as the primary election's front-runner, with Andrea Campbell, Annissa Essaibi George, and Kim Janey being seen as hotly contesting for a second-place finish. Wu's campaign was boosted by a collection of young internet activists who had vigorously supported her, referred to as the "Markeyverse" due to their support for Senator Ed Markey in his re-election campaign the previous year.

=== Debates ===
2021 Boston mayoral election primary debates
No.	Date & time	Host	Moderator	Link	Participants				
Key: P Participant A Absent N Non-invitee									
Key: P Participant A Absent N Non-invitee					John Barros	Andrea Campbell	Annissa Essaibi George	Kim Janey	Michelle Wu
1	September 8, 2021	NBC Boston; NECN; Telemundo Boston; Dorchester Reporter; Bay State Banner	Shannon Mulaire	Video	P	P	P	P	P

=== Endorsements ===
Andrea Campbell

State Executives

- Andrea Cabral, former Massachusetts secretary of public safety and former Suffolk County sheriff

State legislators

- Liz Malia, state representative for the 11th Suffolk district
- Marie St. Fleur, former state representative for the 5th Suffolk district
- Chynah Tyler, state representative for the 7th Suffolk district
- Martha M. Walz, former state representative for the 8th Suffolk district

Individuals

- Bill Walczak, activist, CEO of the South End Community Health Center, founder of Codman Square Health Center, and candidate for mayor in 2013

Newspapers

- The Boston Globe
Annissa Essaibi George

State legislators

- Kevin Honan, state representative for the 17th Suffolk district (previously endorsed Santiago)

Local officials

- William G. Gross, former Boston police commissioner

Labor unions

- AFSCME Council 93
- ATU Local 589
- Boston Emergency Medical Services Union
- IBEW Local 2222
- International Association of Fire Fighters Local 718
- Massachusetts Nurses Association
Kim Janey

State legislators

- Nika Elugardo, state representative for the 15th Suffolk district
- Mel King, former state representative for the 9th Suffolk district and candidate for mayor in 1983
- Jon Santiago, state representative for the 9th Suffolk district and candidate for mayor in 2021
- Dianne Wilkerson, former state senator for the 2nd Suffolk district

Local officials

- Felix D. Arroyo, Suffolk County register of probate
- Ricardo Arroyo, Boston city councilor
- Maura Hennigan, former Boston city councilor and candidate for mayor in 2005
- Tito Jackson, former Boston city councilor and candidate for mayor in 2017
- Charles Yancey, former Boston city councilor and candidate for mayor in 2013

Labor unions

- SEIU 32BJ
- SEIU Local 888
- UNITE HERE Local 26
Jon Santiago (withdrew and endorsed Janey)

State legislators

- Ed Coppinger, state representative for the 10th Suffolk District
- Claire Cronin, state representative and majority leader
- Paul Donato, state representative
- William Driscoll, state representative
- Sean Garballey, state representative
- Jessica Giannino, state representative
- Danielle Gregoire, state representative
- Richard Haggerty, state representative
- Kate Hogan, state representative and speaker pro tempore
- Kevin Honan, state representative
- Meghan Kilcoyne, state representative
- Ronald Mariano, speaker of the Massachusetts House of Representatives
- Paul McMurtry, state representative
- Aaron Michlewitz, state representative for the 3rd Suffolk District and chairman of the House Ways and Means Committee
- Frank Moran, state representative
- Michael Moran, state representative and assistant majority leader
- Jim O'Day, state representative
- Dan Ryan, state representative for the 2nd Suffolk district
- Tommy Vitolo, state representative

Labor unions

- Laborers Local 223
- NAGE/SEIU Local 5000

Organizations

- 314 Action Fund
- VoteVets
Michelle Wu

U.S. senators

- Tammy Duckworth, U.S senator from Illinois, former member of the U.S House of Representatives from Illinois's 8th congressional district
- Elizabeth Warren, U.S senator from Massachusetts, 2020 candidate for president

Statewide officeholders

- Jay Gonzalez, former secretary of administration and finance of Massachusetts and Democratic nominee for governor of Massachusetts in 2018

State legislators

- Julian Cyr, state senator
- Sal DiDomenico, state senator and assistant majority leader
- Natalie Higgins, state representative
- Vanna Howard, state representative
- Aaron Michlewitz, state representative for the 3rd Suffolk District and chairman of the House Ways and Means Committee (previously endorsed Santiago)
- Michael Moran, state representative and assistant majority leader (previously endorsed Santiago)
- Tram Nguyen, state representative
- Maria Robinson, state representative
- Byron Rushing, former state representative
- Andy Vargas, state representative
- Tommy Vitolo, state representative (previously endorsed Santiago)

Local officeholders

- Liz Breadon, Boston city councilor
- Lydia Edwards, Boston city councilor

Individuals

- Bill McKibben, environmentalist and leader of 350.org
- Sara Nelson, president of the Association of Flight Attendants

Labor unions

- Association of Flight Attendants
- OPEIU Local 453
- Teamsters Local 25
- UNITE HERE New England Joint Board
- United Auto Workers Region 9A

Organizations

- 350 Action and 350 Mass Action
- AAPI Victory Fund
- Massachusetts Sierra Club
- Sunrise Movement Boston

=== Polling ===
Graphical summary

Poll source	Date(s) administered	Sample size (Note: Key: A – all adults RV – registered voters LV – likely voters V – unclear)	Margin of error	John Barros	Andrea Campbell	Annissa Essaibi George	Kim Janey	Jon Santiago	Michelle Wu	Other	Undecided
Public Policy Polling (D)	September 11–12, 2021	522 (LV)	± 4.3%	4%	16%	19%	15%	–	26%	–	19%
Beacon Research (D) (Note: Poll sponsored by Better Boston PAC, which backed Andrea Campbell's candidacy)	September 6–8, 2021	985 (LV)	± 3.1%	3%	19%	19%	15%	–	33%	–	–
Emerson College	September 6–8, 2021	600 (LV)	± 3.9%	2%	17%	18%	16%	1%	30%	2% (Note: Robert Cappucci and Richard Spagnuolo 1%, and "Someone else" with 0%)	14%
Emerson College	September 6–8, 2021	600 (LV)	± 3.9%	3%	20%	21%	18%	1%	36%	2% (Note: Robert Cappucci and Richard Spagnuolo with 1%, "someone else" with 0%)	– (Note: After all undecideds in the initial vote question forced to select a candidate)
Suffolk University	September 2–4, 2021	500 (LV)	± 4.4%	3%	18%	19%	20%	0%	31%	1% (Note: Robert Cappucci and Richard Spagnuolo with 0%)	9%
MassINC Polling Group	August 25–30, 2021	453 (RV)	± 4.6%	4%	11%	13%	15%	–	30%	4%	23%
MassINC Polling Group	August 25–30, 2021	– (LV)	–	6%	11%	16%	12%	–	30%	4%	20%
Emerson College	August 23–24, 2021	600 (LV)	± 3.9%	2%	14%	18%	16%	1%	24%	1% (Note: Robert Cappucci, Richard Spagnuolo, and "Someone else" with 0%)	25%
Change Research (D) (Note: Poll sponsored by Essaibi George's campaign)	August 16–21, 2021	600 (RV)	± 3.9%	5%	10%	15%	15%	–	27%	–	28%
Suffolk University	June 23–26, 2021	500 (LV)	± 4.4%	2%	11%	14%	22%	5%	23%	1% (Note: Robert Cappucci with 1%; Richard Spagnuolo and "Other" with 0%)	22%
GBAO (D) (Note: Poll sponsored by Wu's campaign)	Early June 2021	600 (LV)	± 4.0%	3%	8%	12%	29%	4%	29%	1% (Note: Robert Cappucci with 1%)	–
Poll Progressive LLC (D)	May 25–30, 2021	550 (LV)	± 4.1%	5%	6%	22%	16%	5%	18%	–	29%
Global Strategy Group (D)	May 13–16, 2021	400 (LV)	± 4.9%	5%	6%	10%	22%	5%	21%	1%	31%
Emerson College	April 27–28, 2021	860 (RV)	± 3.3%	3%	11%	14%	15%	4%	16%	1% (Note: Michael J. Bianci II with 1%)	36%
MassINC Polling Group	April 7–11, 2021	522 (RV)	± 4.9%	3%	4%	6%	18%	3%	19%	–	46%
MassINC Polling Group	September 11–15, 2020	400 (RV)	± 4.9%	–	4%	–	–	–	23%	52% (Note: Marty Walsh with 46%, "Another candidate" with 6%)	18%

=== Campaign finances ===
The following table lists the campaign fundraising and spending totals for each candidates from the dates they each formally launched their campaigns, through the day of the September 14, 2021 primary. Candidates are, by default, sorted in the table in the order of their total funds raised since launching their campaigns, from greatest (at top) to least (at bottom).

Campaign finances
Candidate	Total raised	Total spent	Date of campaign launch
Michelle Wu	$1,872,146.14	$2,063,046.96	September 15, 2020
Andrea Campbell	$1,821,643.65	$1,915,609.83	September 24, 2020
Kim Janey	$1,344,171.05	$1,486,589.41	April 6, 2021
Annissa Essaibi George	$1,261,144.92	$1,401,799.88	January 28, 2021
John Barros	$575,631.18	$644,541.90	March 4, 2021

Independent expenditures
The following table lists reported independent expenditures made in support or opposition to each candidate from the start of September 2020, through the day of the September 14, 2021 primary. Candidates are listed by default by the total of independent expenditures made in support of them, from greatest (at top) to least (at bottom).

Independent expenditures
Candidate	In support	In opposition
Andrea Campbell	$1,616,712.00	$34,194.66
Annissa Essaibi George	$663,481.74	$0.00
Michelle Wu	$417,613.69	$0.00
Kim Janey	$411,075.82	$0.00
John Barros	$0.00	$0.00

=== Results ===
There were reportedly twice the number of postal votes cast than election officials had anticipated. In a statement by the Boston Election Department, an hours-long delay on election night in reporting substantial results was blamed on the need to cross-reference the roughly 7,000 postal votes cast by mail or drop-box with the voter rolls. On Twitter, Massachusetts secretary of the commonwealth William F. Galvin's office also laid the blame on drop boxes. With only a small fraction of the vote centrally reported, Janey and Campbell conceded, and Wu and Essaibi George both gave victory speeches. Both Wu and Essaibi George had support from distinct geographical bases, with Essaibi George's margins largely coming from the more conservative areas of South Boston and Dorchester, while Wu's strongest areas were East Boston, Jamaica Plain and Roslindale. Janey won strong support from Boston's African-American community and carried Hyde Park, while Campbell largely ran second in both African-American and more left-wing wards.

Janey's defeat made her the first incumbent of any kind since 1949 to lose a Boston mayoral election.

Results by precinct and ward
Wu: 20–30% 30–40% 40–50% 50–60% 60–70%
Essaibi George: 20–30% 30–40% 40–50% 50–60% 60–70% 70–80%
Campbell: 30–40% 50–60%
Janey: 20–30% 30–40% 40–50% 50–60% 60–70%
Barros: 20–30% 30–40% 40–50%
Tie: 20–30% 30–40%

Primary election results
Party	Candidate	Votes	%
Nonpartisan	Michelle Wu	36,060	33.4
Nonpartisan	Annissa Essaibi George	24,268	22.5
Nonpartisan	Andrea Campbell	21,299	19.7
Nonpartisan	Kim Janey (acting incumbent)	21,047	19.5
Nonpartisan	John Barros	3,459	3.2
Nonpartisan	Robert Cappucci	1,185	1.1
Nonpartisan	Jon Santiago (withdrawn)	368	0.3
Nonpartisan	Richard Spagnuolo	286	0.3
Total votes		107,972	100
Turnout		108,731	24.84
Registered electors		437,647	

== General election ==
=== Campaign ===
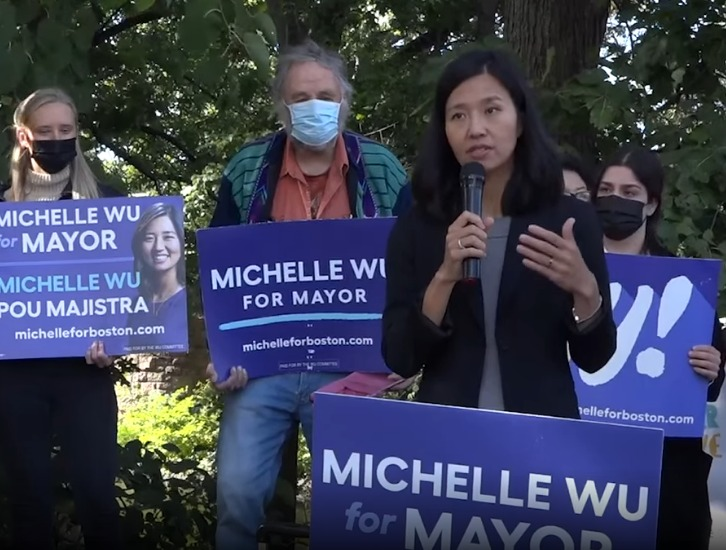
Wu campaigning for the general election

2021 marked the first time in Boston's history that both candidates in the general election identified as people of color. It also marked the first time that both were women. Wu was regarded to be a progressive, while Essaibi George was thought of as a moderate.

Wu was endorsed for the general election by eliminated candidate Kim Janey. The neighborhood of Hyde Park was considered a potential battleground in the election, due to it being home to a substantial voter base that had not backed either Wu or Essaibi George in the preliminary.

At the start of the general election campaign, Joe Battenfield of the Boston Herald described Wu as the general election's "presumptive front-runner". William Forry and Gintautas Dumcius of the Dorchester Reporter also opined that Wu was the leading candidate. By early October, there was a wide perception of Wu being the leading candidate in the race. At that time, Meghan E. Irons and Emma Platoff of The Boston Globe opined that the developments of the general election campaign had largely been falling in Wu's favor, particularly pointing to endorsements which Wu had received. Writing again in mid-October, Battenfield characterized Wu's campaign as "coasting on a front-runner campaign strategy".

Politico characterized Wu's victory as a "major win for progressives," in a calendar year when other off-year races had seen only, "sporadic triumphs and some big losses for the left", which had been locally hailed as "a culmination of years of progressive gains on [The Boston City Council]".

=== Debates ===
2021 Boston mayoral election general election debates
No.	Date & time	Host	Moderator	Link	Participants	
Key: P Participant A Absent N Non-invitee						
Key: P Participant A Absent N Non-invitee					Annissa Essaibi George	Michelle Wu
	October 14, 2021	NBC Boston; NECN; Telemundo Boston; Dorchester Reporter; Bay State Banner	Jon Keller	Video	**P**	**P**
	October 19, 2021	NBC Boston; NECN; Telemundo Boston; Dorchester Reporter; Bay State Banner	Latoyia Edwards	Video	**P**	**P**
	October 25, 2021	WBUR-FM; WCVB-TV; University of Massachusetts; The Boston Globe	Ed Harding	Video	**P**	**P**

=== Endorsements ===
Endorsements in bold were made after the preliminary election.

Annissa Essaibi George

State legislators

- Kevin Honan, state representative

Local officials

- **Frank Baker**, Boston city councilor
- William G. Gross, former Boston police commissioner
- **Bill Linehan**, former Boston city councillor

Labor unions

- AFSCME Council 93
- ATU Local 589
- Boston Emergency Medical Services Union
- **IBEW Local 103**
- IBEW Local 2222
- **Iron Workers Local 7**
- International Association of Fire Fighters Local 718
- **IUOE Local 4**
- **IUPAT District Council 35**
- Massachusetts Nurses Association
- **OPCMIA**
- **SEIU 888**
- **SENA Local 9158**
- **Sprinkler Fitters Local 550**

Newspapers and publications

- **Boston Herald**
Michelle Wu

Federal officeholders

- Tammy Duckworth, U.S. senator from Illinois, former U.S representative from Illinois's 8th congressional district
- **Ed Markey**, U.S. senator from Massachusetts
- **Ayanna Pressley**, U.S. representative from Massachusetts's 7th congressional district
- Elizabeth Warren, U.S. senator from Massachusetts, 2020 candidate for president

Statewide officeholders

- **James Aloisi**, former secretary of transportation of Massachusetts
- Jay Gonzalez, former secretary of administration and finance of Massachusetts and Democratic nominee for governor of Massachusetts in 2018
- **Deval Patrick**, former governor of Massachusetts
- **Frederick P. Salvucci**, former secretary of transportation of Massachusetts

State legislators

- **Sonia Chang-Díaz**, state senator and 2022 candidate for governor
- **Mike Connolly**, state representative
- Julian Cyr, state senator
- Sal DiDomenico, state senator and assistant majority leader
- **Nika Elugardo**, state representative
- **Charlotte Golar Richie**, former state representative and candidate for Mayor in 2013
- Natalie Higgins, state representative
- Vanna Howard, state representative
- **Jay Livingstone**, state representative
- **Adrian Madaro**, state representative
- Aaron Michlewitz, state representative for the 3rd Suffolk District and chairman of the House Ways and Means Committee
- **Liz Miranda**, state representative
- Michael Moran, state representative and assistant majority leader
- Tram Nguyen, state representative
- Maria Robinson, state representative
- Byron Rushing, former state representative
- Andy Vargas, state representative
- Tommy Vitolo, state representative
- **Dianne Wilkerson**, former state senator

Local officeholders

- **Felix D. Arroyo**, Suffolk County register of probate
- **Ricardo Arroyo**, Boston city councilor
- Liz Breadon, Boston city councilor
- Lydia Edwards, Boston city councilor
- **Tito Jackson**, former Boston city councilor and candidate for Mayor in 2017
- **Kim Janey**, incumbent acting mayor of Boston and former 2021 mayoral candidate

Individuals

- Bill McKibben, environmentalist and leader of 350.org
- Sara Nelson, president of the Association of Flight Attendants

Labor unions

- **1199 SEIU**
- Association of Flight Attendants
- **Laborer's Local 22**
- **NASRCC**
- OPEIU Local 453
- **SEIU 32BJ**
- **SEIU 509**
- Teamsters Local 25
- **UFCW Local 1445**
- UNITE HERE New England Joint Board
- United Auto Workers Region 9A

Organizations

- 350 Action
- AAPI Victory Fund
- **Bay State Stonewall Democrats**
- Massachusetts Sierra Club
- **Our Revolution**
- **Planned Parenthood Advocacy Fund of Massachusetts**
- Sunrise Movement Boston
- **Working Families Party**

Newspapers

- **The Boston Globe**
- **The Daily Free Press**
- **El Planeta**

=== Polling ===
Graphical summary

Poll source	Date(s) administered	Sample size	Margin of error	Annissa Essaibi George	Michelle Wu	Undecided
Emerson College	October 26–27, 2021	500 (LV)	± 4.3%	31%	**61%**	8%
Data for Progress (D)	October 14–18, 2021	507 (LV)	± 4.0%	32%	**57%**	11%
Suffolk University	October 15–17, 2021	500 (LV)	± 4.4%	30%	**62%**	8%
MassINC Polling Group	October 6–12, 2021	501 (LV)	± 4.9%	25%	**57%**	18%
Public Policy Polling (D)	September 11–12, 2021	522 (LV)	± 4.3%	28%	**48%**	23%

Hypothetical polling

Andrea Campbell vs. Michelle Wu

Poll source	Date(s) administered	Sample size	Margin of error	Andrea Campbell	Michelle Wu	Undecided
Public Policy Polling (D)	September 11–12, 2021	522 (LV)	± 4.3%	35%	**38%**	27%

Kim Janey vs. Michelle Wu

Poll source	Date(s) administered	Sample size	Margin of error	Kim Janey	Michelle Wu	Undecided
Public Policy Polling (D)	September 11–12, 2021	522 (LV)	± 4.3%	29%	**45%**	26%

=== Campaign finances ===
The following table lists the campaign fundraising and spending totals for each candidates following the end of the primary election through the election, the period of September 15, 2021 through November 2, 2021. The candidates are, by default, sorted in the table in the order of their total funds raised, from greatest (at top) to least (at bottom).

Campaign finances
Candidate	Total raised	Total spent
Annissa Essaibi George	$1,294,100.09	$1,212,502.11
Michelle Wu	$1,084,193.19	$995,774.21

Independent expenditures
The following table lists reported independent expenditures made in support or opposition to each candidate between September 15, 2021, and November 2, 2021. Candidates are listed by default by the total of independent expenditures made in support of them, from greatest (at top) to least (at bottom).

Independent expenditures
Candidate	In support	In opposition
Annissa Essaibi George	$1,209,267.89	$0.00
Michelle Wu	$879,099.92	$342,500.00

=== Results ===
General election results
Party	Candidate	Votes	%
**Nonpartisan**	**Michelle Wu**	**91,794**	**64.0**
Nonpartisan	Annissa Essaibi George	51,125	35.6
Write-in		595	0.4
Total votes		**143,514**	**100**
Turnout		144,380	32.66%
Registered electors		442,049	

== Notes ==
Partisan clients

== See also ==
- List of mayors of Boston, Massachusetts
