= Walt Fitzgerald =

American football official and ice hockey coach (1922–2010)

Walter D. Fitzgerald (October 28, 1922 – March 18, 2010) was an American football official who was a referee in the American Football League from 1961 to 1969 and the National Football League in 1970. Fitzgerald was also an ice hockey player and coach, playing for the Boston College Eagles men's ice hockey team and coaching the UMass Minutemen.

== Hockey ==
Fitzgerald was a defenceman for the Boston College Eagles men's ice hockey team from 1941 to 1943 and was a member of the BC team that captured the 1942 Amateur Athletic Union Championship. He was also a member of the 1943 Boston College Eagles football team. After graduating, he joined the Boston Olympics of the Eastern Hockey League, but his rights were transferred to the expansion Brooklyn Crescents. He attended the University of Notre Dame as part of the V-12 Navy College Training Program and served as an officer in the United States Navy during World War II and the Korean War.

== Coaching ==
From 1946 to 1986, Fizgerald was a physical education teacher in the Boston Public Schools. From 1954 to 1980, he coached baseball, football, and ice hockey at the Boston Trade High School for Boys.

In 1949, Fitzgerald was named hockey coach at the University of Massachusetts. The Minutemen went 2–3–2 in their only season under Fitzgerald.

== Officiating ==
Fitzgerald officiated high school and college football games in Massachusetts. He was a referee in the American Football League from 1961 to 1969 and in the National Football League for one season (1970) following the AFL–NFL merger. He was the referee for the 1966 and 1968 American Football League Championship Games.

== Personal life and death ==
Fitzgerald resided in Dorchester, Boston and was a winter resident of Naples, Florida for 23 years. He died on March 18, 2010 in Naples following surgery. He was predeceased by his wife and survived by three children. He was buried in St. Joseph Cemetery in West Roxbury, Massachusetts.
