= John F. Moran =

American politician

John Francis Moran
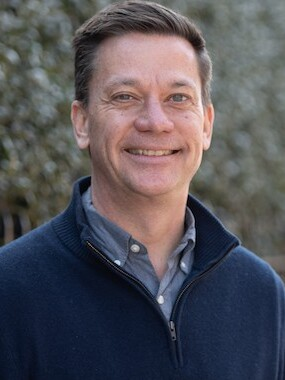
- Official portrait

Member of the Massachusetts House of Representatives from the 9th Suffolk district
- Incumbent
- Assumed office June 7, 2023
- Preceded by: Jon Santiago

Personal details
- Party: Democratic
- Education: Earlham College (BA); Tufts University (MA)

John Moran is an American Democratic politician who has served as the Massachusetts state representative for the 9th Suffolk district since June 2023. Moran represents parts of the South End, Roxbury, Back Bay, Newmarket, and Dorchester.

== Early life and career ==
Moran was born in Scranton, Pennsylvania and was raised by his mother and stepfather. In elementary school, his family moved to Clifford, Pennsylvania where his mother volunteered for many organizations and his stepfather was an elected tax collector for over 20 years.

Moran graduated from Mountain View High School. In high school, he spent a year in Japan as a Rotary International exchange student. After high school, Moran earned a bachelor’s degree in Japanese studies with a minor in economics from Earlham College. Upon graduation, Moran went back to Japan and served as a coordinator of international relations for Japan’s Wakayama prefecture.

Following his time in Japan, Moran continued his education at the Fletcher School at Tufts University where he focused on international business and earned a MALD degree.

Upon receiving his Master's degree, Moran worked for Gtech Holdings, then joined Bose as an auditor and later a senior financial analyst. After that, Moran spent almost 20 years in a variety of jobs with Liberty Mutual, finishing up there as director of strategy and planning and chief of staff for global retail markets. Moran spent a year as a consultant with Systems Evolution, Boston LLC, then three years as a top manager at Biogen.

From 2021 to 2023, Moran served on Boston City Council member Tania Fernandes Anderson’s Advisory Council. In 2022, he was a volunteer for the Alliance for Downtown Civic Organizations (ADCO).

Moran has also volunteered for the Human Rights Campaign, served as vice-president of the Board of Directors for the Boston Gay Men's Chorus, and was a founding member of Liberty Mutual’s LGBTQ+ employee resource group.

== Personal life ==
Moran has lived in Boston for more than 24 years and currently lives in the South End with his partner and dog, Edna.
