= Jon Santiago =

American politician and physician

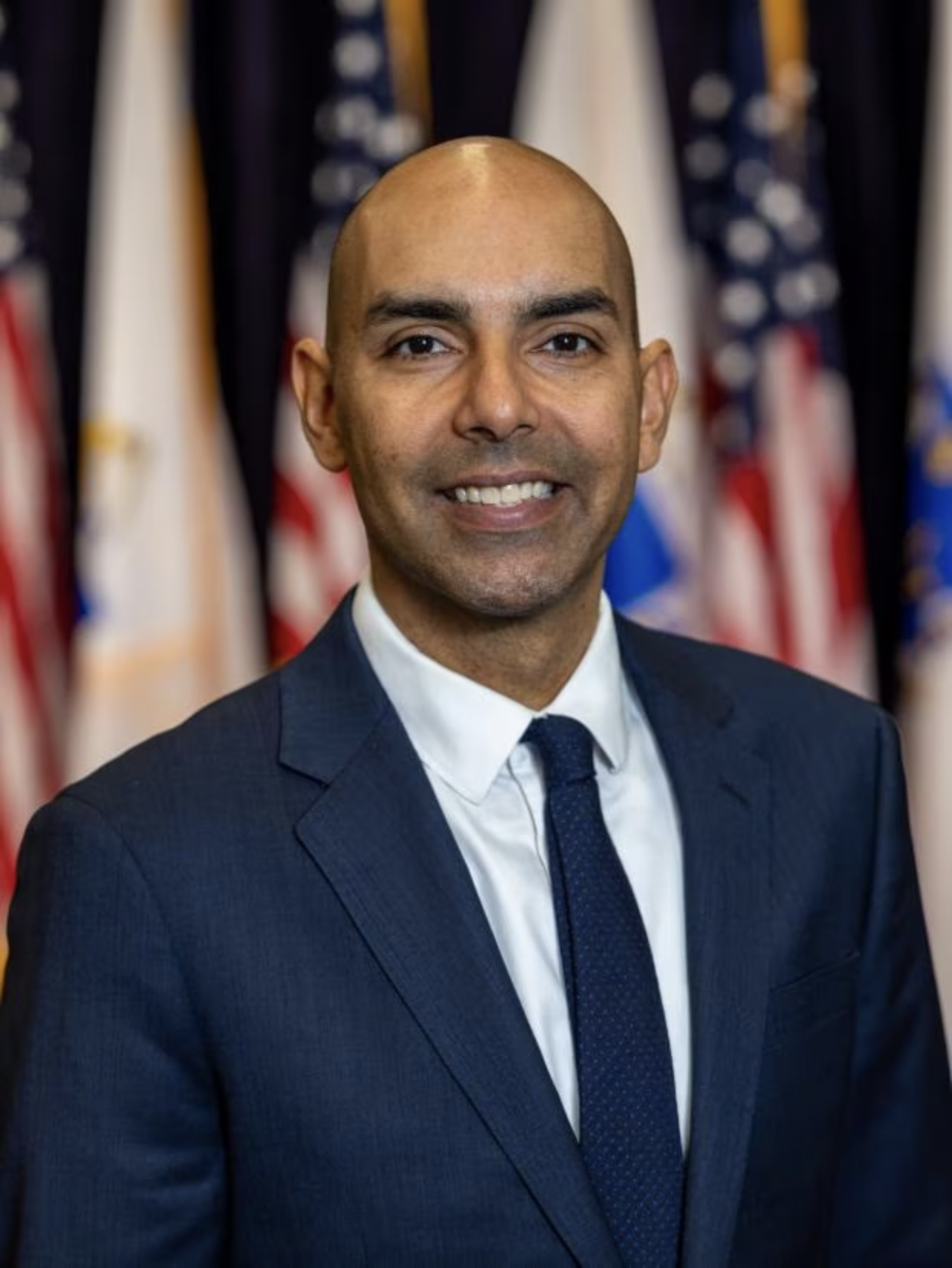
- Official portrait, 2023

Secretary of Veterans' Services of Massachusetts
- In office 2023–2025
- Appointed by: Maura Healey
- Preceded by: Cheryl Lussier Poppe
- Succeeded by: Eric Goralnick

Member of the Massachusetts House of Representatives from the 9th Suffolk district
- In office January 2, 2019 – March 1, 2023
- Preceded by: Byron Rushing
- Succeeded by: John Moran

Personal details
- Born: Jon Santiago; April 1, 1982 (age 44) Mayagüez, Puerto Rico, U.S.
- Party: Democratic
- Education: University of Texas at Austin (BA); University of Washington (MPH); Yale University (MD)

Military service
- Allegiance: United States
- Branch/service: United States Army: United States Army Reserve
- Years of service: 2013–2025
- Rank: Major

Jon Santiago (born April 1, 1982) is an American physician and Democratic politician who served as the Massachusetts state representative for the 9th Suffolk district from 2019 to 2023 and Massachusetts' Secretary of the Executive Office of Veterans' Services from 2023 to 2025. He ran a campaign for mayor of Boston in 2021, but withdrew from the race before the primary election.

== Early life and education ==
Santiago was born in Mayagüez, Puerto Rico and raised in Boston and is of Puerto Rican descent.

Enlisted in the United States Army Reserve while a medical student, Santiago is a Major in the United States Army Reserve. He provided emergency medical care and led health service operations in both combat and contingency environments—supporting U.S. and allied forces across the United States Central Command (CENTCOM) area of operations. He was also deployed overseas twice during Operation Inherent Resolve (Syria) and Operation Spartan Shield (Kuwait). His military awards are Army Commendation Medal (x2) with Combat Device, the Army Reserve Components Achievement Medal, the National Defense Service Medal, the Global War on Terrorism Expeditionary Medal, the Global War on Terrorism Service Medal, the Armed Forces Reserve Medal, the Army Service Ribbon, and the Inherent Resolve Campaign Medal.

He previously served as a volunteer community health specialist to the Peace Corps.

Santiago graduated from The University of Texas at Austin with a BA, Religious Studies; Biology. The University of Washington MPH, Global Health and the Yale School of Medicine. He is a member of the Massachusetts Black and Latino Legislative Caucus.

== State representative ==
Santiago served as the Massachusetts state representative for the 9th Suffolk district from 2019 to 2023. His district mostly comprises the South End neighborhood of Boston, though it also includes parts of Boston's Roxbury, Back Bay and Fenway neighborhoods. His 2018 victory in the Democratic primary unseated the chamber's assistant majority leader Byron Rushing, who had represented the district since 1983. Santiago had at one time been a State House intern for Rushing before challenging him to his seat.

Santiago continues to serve as an attending physician in emergency medicine for the Boston Medical Center, arguing that such a job informs his legislation, especially when it comes to matters of public health like the opioid epidemic.

Santiago resigned from the legislature on March 1, 2023, after being appointed by governor Maura Healey to become Massachusetts' Secretary of the Executive Office of Veterans' Services.

== 2021 Boston mayoral campaign ==
On February 23, 2021, he announced his candidacy for the 2021 Boston mayoral election.

He withdrew from the race on July 13, 2021, and later endorsed Acting Mayor Kim Janey ahead of the preliminary election. Because he ended his campaign after the withdrawal deadline, he was still listed on the ballot.

== Massachusetts Secretary of Veterans' Services ==
Santiago was appointed by Governor Maura Healey to serve as Massachusetts' inaugural Secretary of the Executive Office of Veterans' Services, heading the Massachusetts Executive Office of Veterans' Services. The office and the secretary position were created by legislation that had been passed in 2022, and came into creation on March 1, 2023. It assumed roles previously housed within the Massachusetts Executive Office of Health and Human Services. He resigned in 2025 to resume his medical career.

== See also ==
- 2019–2020 Massachusetts legislature
- 2021–2022 Massachusetts legislature
