= Tim Costello (labor advocate) =

American labor activist and writer (1945–2009)

Timothy Mark Costello (June 13, 1945 – December 4, 2009) was an American labor and anti-globalization advocate who started his career as a truck driver, driving fuel trucks and as a long-haul trucker. He was a founder of the North American Alliance for Fair Employment (NAAFE), a network of organizations opposed to the use of temporary workers.

== Early life and education ==
Costello was born on June 13, 1945, and raised in Dedham, Massachusetts. His father was president of a railway car welders union local. He graduated in 1964 from the Huntington School for Boys in Boston, before attending Goddard College, Franconia College and The New School, all without earning a degree. It wouldn't be until 1990 when he would ultimately earn his degree from the University of Massachusetts Boston.

== Career ==
He started driving oil trucks while in New York and continued to do so after returning to Boston in 1971. While in Boston, he shifted to long-haul truck driving and became a critic of corruption in the Teamsters union. After meeting labor historian, Jeremy Brecher, in 1973, the two co-authored the book Common Sense for Hard Times during the recession in the mid-1970s, using his travels around the country to document the economic downturn's effects on younger workers, often writing in the back of his truck; The two would collaborate for the next 35 years.

He founded the Campaign on Contingent Work in 1999, which became part of the NAAFE. In 2005, Costello created Global Labor Strategies to foster the formation of international alliances opposed to the lowering of working standards and wages resulting from globalization.

His 2000 book, Globalization From Below: The Power of Solidarity, was described by The New York Times as "a primer for labor advocates who argued that globalization was destroying jobs and reducing wages in the United States while exploiting workers in Asia". Other works co-authored with Jeremy Brecher include Building Bridges: The Emerging Grassroots Coalition of Labor and Community (1990) and Global Village or Global Pillage: Economic Reconstruction From the Bottom Up (1994).

== Death ==
Tim Costello died at age 64 on December 4, 2009, of pancreatic cancer at his home in Cambridge, Massachusetts. He is survived by his wife, Susanne Rasmussen, as well as by two daughters, two grandchildren and a brother.
