= Massachusetts Executive Office of Veterans' Services =

Massachusetts government agency

Massachusetts Executive Office of Veterans Services

Agency overview
- Jurisdiction: Massachusetts
- Agency executive: Eric Goralnick, Secretary of Veterans Services
- Website: https://www.mass.gov/orgs/executive-office-of-veterans-services

The Massachusetts Executive Office of Veterans Services is a Commonwealth of Massachusetts organization whose focus is the protection of veterans and their families through support systems and emergency financial assistance. As an executive agency, the office is managed by a secretary who is appointed by the governor.

== Mission ==
The Executive Office of Veterans Services (EOVS) provides Massachusetts veterans and their families with quality support services. The office was established in the wake of the COVID-19 pandemic, after veterans died from the COVID-19 virus at the Holyoke Soldiers' Home in Holyoke, Massachusetts. In 2022, the Massachusetts state legislature passed a bill establishing EOVS as a cabinet level service in the executive government of the Commonwealth of Massachusetts.

== Leadership ==
The current secretary is Eric Goralnick, who was assumed the role in February 2026.

List of secretaries
No.	Secretary	Term in office	Party	Governor
1	Jon Santiago	March 1, 2023 – 2025	Democratic	Maura T. Healey
2	Eric Goralnick	February 2026–present		Maura T. Healey
