= Byron Rushing =

American politician

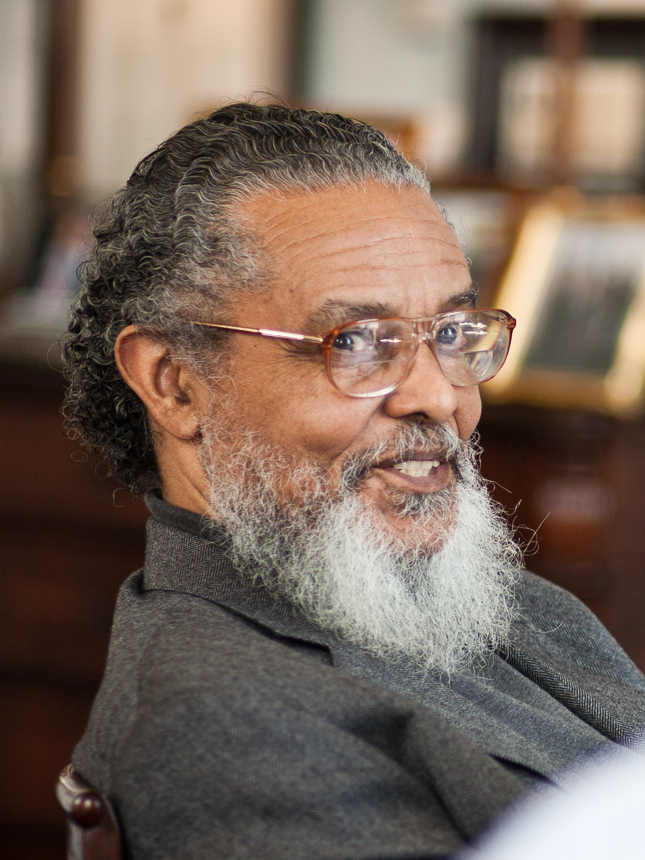
- Rushing in 2012

Assistant Majority Leader of the Massachusetts House of Representatives
- In office December 6, 2011 – January 2, 2019
- Preceded by: Charles Murphy
- Succeeded by: Joseph Wagner

Second Division Chair of the Massachusetts House of Representatives
- In office January 28, 2011 – December 6, 2011
- Preceded by: Kathi-Anne Reinstein

Third Division Chair of the Massachusetts House of Representatives
- In office February 12, 2009 – January 28, 2011

Second Assistant Majority Leader of the Massachusetts House of Representatives
- In office February 7, 2005 – 2009?

Member of the Massachusetts House of Representatives from the 9th Suffolk district
- In office January 2, 1983 – January 2, 2019
- Preceded by: Mel King
- Succeeded by: Jon Santiago

Personal details
- Born: July 29, 1942 (age 83) New York City
- Party: Democratic
- Education: Syracuse Central High School
- Alma mater: Harvard College; Massachusetts Institute of Technology
- Occupation: Educator, politician

Byron Rushing (born July 29, 1942) is an American politician who represented the Ninth Suffolk district in the Massachusetts House of Representatives from 1983 to 2019. He represented the South End neighborhood of Boston. A Democrat, he was first elected in 1982, before losing his 2018 bid for reelection to Jon Santiago in the Democratic primary.

== Early life and education ==
Rushing was born July 29, 1942, in New York City to William Rushing, a janitor, and Linda Turpin, a Jamaican native who migrated to New York to work as a seamstress. Rushing has two older brothers, Lawrence and William. Rushing moved with his family to Syracuse, New York where he attended Madison Junior High and then Syracuse Central High School, where he graduated in 1960. Rushing initially moved to Boston in 1960 to attend university, but dropped out in his junior year. He returned to Boston to work for the Northern Student Movement. He has lived in Boston since 1964.

He attended Harvard College and MIT. Rushing possesses an honorary doctorate from the Episcopal Divinity School, where he serves as an adjunct professor.

== Career ==
During the 1960s, Rushing was active in the civil rights movement, working for the Congress of Racial Equality (CORE) in Syracuse, New York, and was a community organizer for the Northern Student Movement in Boston. He directed Roxbury Associates which helped to found the Lower Roxbury Community Corporation, one of the first CDCs in the nation, and which began some of the earliest organizing in a black community against the war in Vietnam. Rushing was also the president of the Roxbury Historical Society. In 1969, Rushing worked for the Center for Inner City Change in Boston. He became the director of the Urban Change program at the Urban League in 1969.

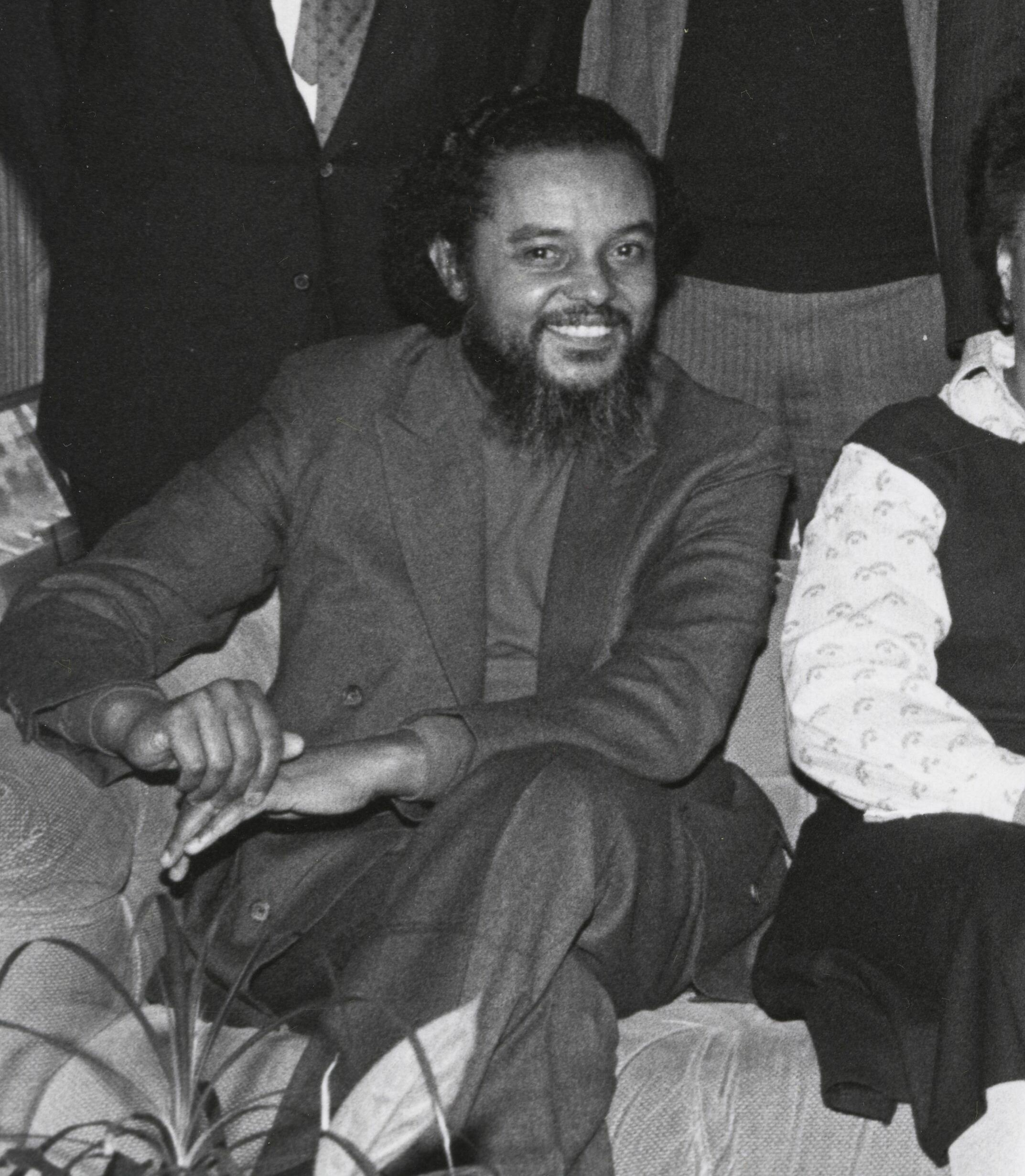
Rushing in the 1980s

From 1972 to 1985, he was President of the Museum of African American History in Boston. Under his direction, the museum purchased and began the restoration of the African Meeting House, the oldest extant black church building in the United States. In 1979, Byron oversaw the lobbying effort in Congress to establish the Boston African American National Historical Site, a component of the National Park Service. Byron led the museum in the study of the history of Roxbury; the museum conducted the archaeological investigation of the Southwest Corridor for the Massachusetts Bay Transportation Authority (MBTA). Byron stays involved in this work; as a legislator, he sponsored the creation of Roxbury Heritage State Park and occasionally leads walking tours of African American and working-class neighborhoods in Boston and Roxbury. Rushing wants Massachusetts state pension funds to help improve underdeveloped areas in the state.

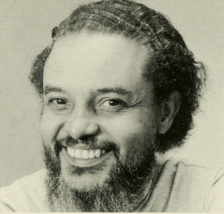
Rushing circa 2003

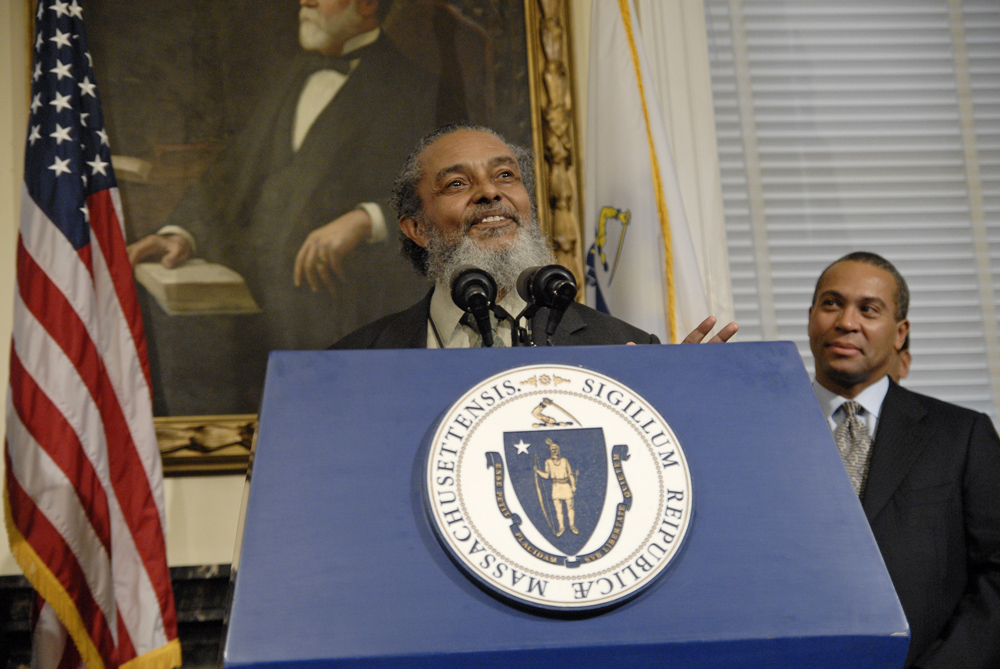
Rushing speaking in 2007, with Governor Deval Patrick looking on

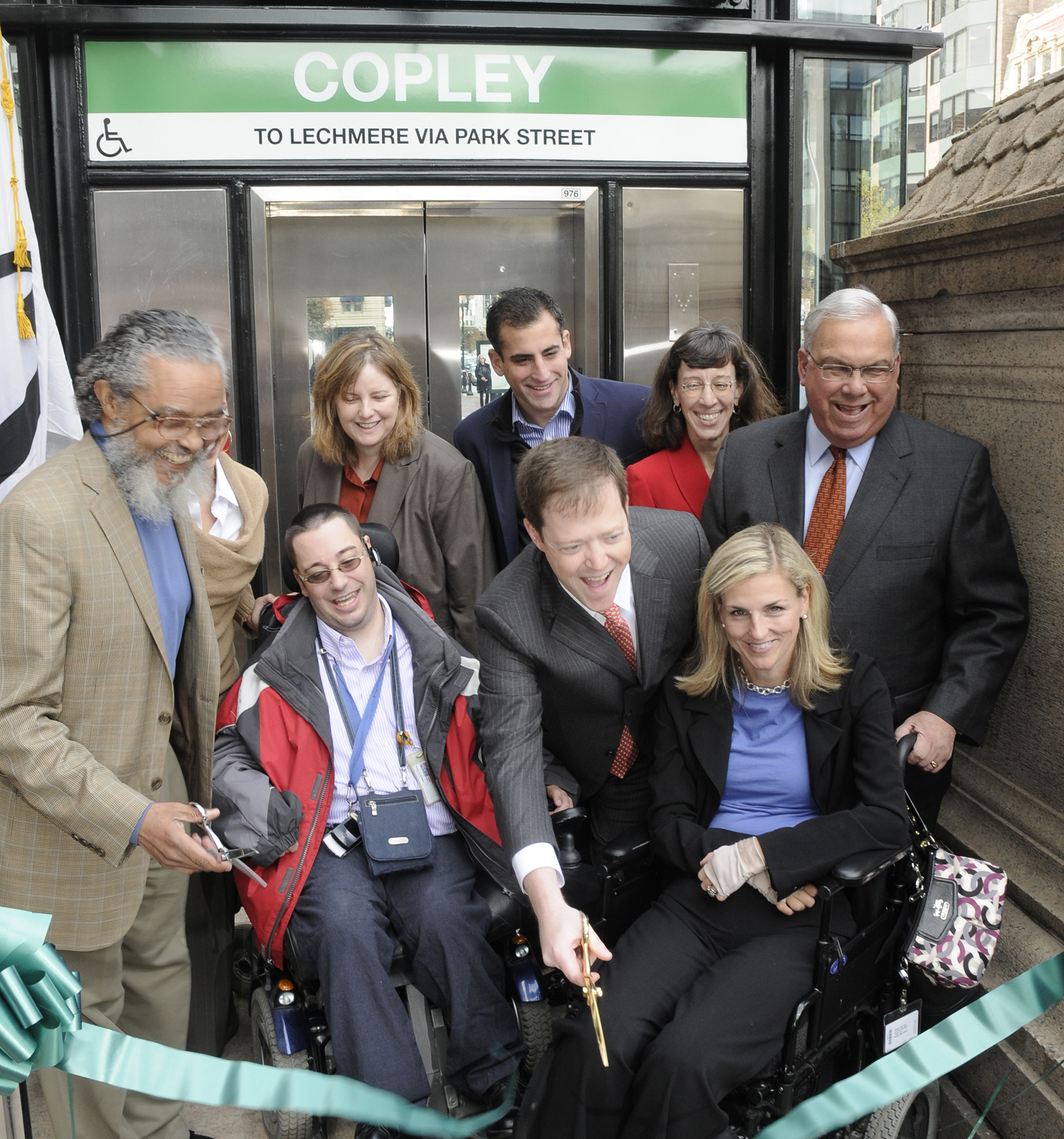
Rushing (far left) celebrates a ribbon cutting at the Copley station in 2010 alongside MBTA General Manager Richard A. Davey, Boston Mayor Thomas Menino, and Boston City Councilor Michael P. Ross

Representative Rushing was an original sponsor of the gay rights bill and the chief sponsor of the law to end discrimination on the basis of sexual orientation in public schools. He is a spokesman against the restoration of the death penalty in Massachusetts and for a moratorium on executions in the nation. He leads the effort for size acceptance and anti-discrimination on the basis of height and weight. He led the Commonwealth's anti-apartheid efforts and was the co-author, with Simon Billenness, and chief sponsor of the Massachusetts Burma law, which was struck down by the U.S. Supreme Court in 2000. He was the chief sponsor of the health reform law ending pre-existing condition refusals by insurance companies. He is a chief sponsor of legislation for needle exchange programs and over-the-counter sale of sterile needles. Rushing advocated for hospitals to establish a set of guidelines to treat victims of violence. He was a sponsor of establishing a rule to provide "treatment on demand" for substance abuse. Rushing acts as a co-chair for the Massachusetts Health Disparities Council. Before his defeat in the 2018 Massachusetts House election, Rushing had also been a consistent opponent of primary seat belt laws in the Bay State, citing racial profiling concerns that such laws would be over-applied to minority drivers in Massachusetts; this issue once again manifested itself as part of a "hands-free cellphone" state-level law proposed by Governor Charlie Baker in January 2019. '

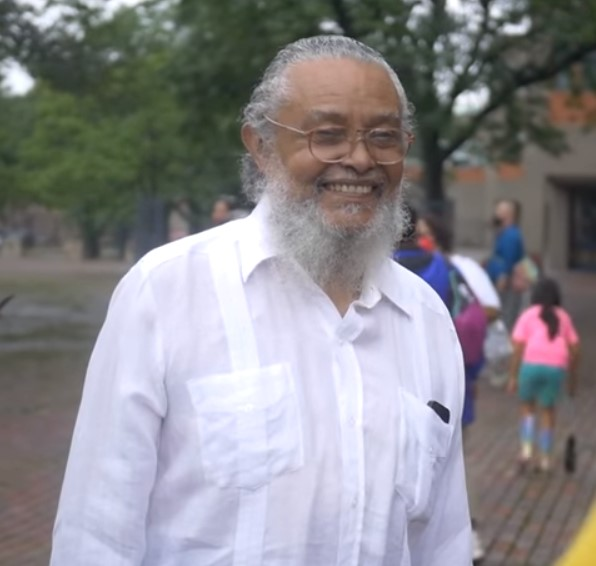
Rushing in 2021

Byron Rushing was running for re-election for State Representative in the Democratic primary scheduled for September 4, 2018, against two Democratic challengers. He ran on his progressive record of accomplishment as well as unfinished work regarding gun safety, immigration, criminal justice reform, affordable housing, civil rights, health care treatment, treatment of drug addiction as a health issue not a crime, and neighborhood quality of life issues. He lost to Progressive primary challenger, Jon Santiago on September 4.

== Personal life ==
Byron Rushing is married to Frieda Garcia and they both live in Boston’s South End in Massachusetts. Rushing is an active Episcopal layperson and a member of St. John's, St. James' Church in Roxbury, Massachusetts. He has been an elected lay deputy to the General Convention since 1973 and was elected Vice-President of the House of Deputies in 2012. Rushing was appointed to the Boston Public Library Board of Trustees in 2010 by Mayor Thomas Menino to help resolve the budget crisis. He is a Second Division Chair at the House Leadership and a member of the Rules Committee.

Rushing has given talks on gentrification, the Boston Redevelopment Authority, and suburbanization as a part of a series on structural racism in Boston, Massachusetts. He was an essential figure alongside Deval Patrick in convincing the black religious community that marriage is a civil right. In 2018, he spoke at The Human Rights Commission at the annual Martin Luther King Jr. Breakfast.

== Awards ==
Rushing and his wife, Garcia, were presented with the Harriet Tubman Community Achievement Award in 2012. In 2014, Rushing was awarded the HistoryMaker Award by The History Project.

== See also ==
- Timeline of Boston, 1980s–present

== Notes ==
1.Sometimes erroneously referred to as Majority Whip.
