= Jeremy Brecher =

American historian

Jeremy Brecher is a historian, documentary filmmaker, activist, and author of books on labor and social movements. Born in Washington, D.C. to freelance writers, he relocated to Cornwall, Connecticut around 1950, where he has resided ever since.

He pursued higher education at Reed College from 1963 to 1965 and the Institute for Policy Studies in Washington, D.C., from 1965 to 1970. Additionally, he worked in the office of Rep. Robert W. Kastenmeier and at the Friends Committee on National Legislation, where he primarily wrote against the Vietnam War. In 1975, Brecher earned a Ph.D. from the Union Graduate School.

== Career ==
=== Labor History ===
In 1969, Brecher and other collaborators including Paul Mattick, Jr., Stanley Aronowitz, and Peter Rachleff began sporadically publishing a magazine and pamphlet series called Root & Branch drawing on the tradition of workers councils and adapting them to contemporary America. In 1975 they published the collection Root & Branch: The Rise of the Workers’ Movements.

=== History from Below ===
Funded by the National Endowment for the Humanities and the Connecticut Humanities Council, the project involved participation of more than 200 workers and community members who provided documents, participated in interviews, served on an advisory committee, and reviewed the project’s products.

Brecher has continued to create community-based historical and cultural products in the Naugatuck Valley. From 1988 to 1996 the Waterbury Ethnic Music Project collected and recorded hundreds of songs and tunes in more than 20 ethnic groups and produced 13 public radio programs in the Brass City Music series and the public television documentary Brass City Music as well as six Brass Valley Music Festivals. He served as project historian for the exhibit Brass Roots at Waterbury’s Mattatuck Museum, which received 900,000 visitors between 1986 and 2005. He also served as project historian for the Mattatuck Museum’s new permanent exhibit, Coming Home, Building Community in a Changing World, which won the 2010 Wilber Cross Award of the Connecticut Humanities Council for “Exemplary Public Programming.” Between 1990 and 2006 he served as project historian for a series of oral history projects and community exhibits on neighborhoods and the African American, Jewish, and Puerto Rican communities in Waterbury.

Professor Robert Forrant of the University of Massachusetts Lowell wrote in the ILR Review, “Brecher employs his knowledge of labor history and a great capacity for listening to his interviewees to tell the story of the Naugatuck Valley Project’s (NVP) success in keeping open nearly a dozen industrial plants and eventually starting new employee-owned businesses.”

Cornwall in Pictures: A Visual Reminiscence, 1868-1941, published in 2001 in collaboration with a local community working group in Brecher’s home town of Cornwall, Connecticut was favorably reviewed by the New York Times on its publication in 2001; and later received a 2003 Certificate of Commendation from the American Association for State and Local History.

Brecher’s “history from below” work has pioneered what historical theorist Michael Frisch has called “shared authority” between history professionals and the communities they study and address. According to historian James R. Green, the “exciting use of oral history” as a “record of how people told their stories and made their own historical interpretations” was “epitomized in the work of Jeremy Brecher and his colleagues.”

=== Connecticut Public TV and Radio ===
From 1989 to 2001 Brecher served as Scholar-in-Residence at Connecticut Public Television and Radio, a position supported by the Connecticut Humanities Council.

During his scholarship at CPTV, Brecher was hired by the Connecticut Humanities Council as writer to help develop the series The Connecticut Experience. He worked alongside CPTV directors, producers, and Council leaders, including Executive Director Bruce Fraser, to connect academic research with television production. For this docuseries, the Council won the 1995 Schwartz Prize from the Federation of State Humanities Councils. Furthermore, Brecher wrote the scripts for the documentaries: The Roots of Roe, Schools in Black and White, Rust Valley, The Amistad Revolt, Electronic Road Film, Brass City Music, and Dance on the Wind, the last two of which he co-produced.

Brecher participated as one of the producer-writers and hosts of Connecticut Public Radio’s Remembering Connecticut, broadcasting over 80 radio programs on local topics. The Oral History Review praised Remembering Connecticut as “One of the most ambitious, and certainly the longest-running, radio history series in the United States. . . ”

In 2000 Brecher received the Connecticut Humanities Council Wilber Cross Award for Humanities Scholar of the Year.

=== Globalization ===
In 2005, Tim Costello asked Brecher and Brendan Smith to collaborate in creating an organization called Global Labor Strategies (GLS) “to contribute to building global labor solidarity through research, analysis, strategic thinking, and network building around labor and employment issues.” In 2006 GLS discovered a debate unfolding in China about a Labor Contract Law whose key provisions were being opposed by the American and European Chambers of Commerce. Global Labor Strategies organized an international protest against this corporate opposition in the aftermath of which international union federations pressured their employers to reverse course; human rights organizations mobilized support for Chinese workers' rights; US members of Congress introduced legislation decrying the corporate intervention and apparent administration complicity; and China's official labor organization, the All-China Federation of Trade Unions (ACFTU), took a strong stand against corporate pressure. This innovative work was prematurely ended by Costello’s death in 2009.

=== Climate Protection ===
Brecher first became aware of the threat of global warming in the early 1970s from the writings of social ecologist Murray Bookchin. In Common Sense for Hard Times, Brecher and Costello, citing Barry Commoner, warned that environmental degradation could destroy the capability of the environment to support a reasonably civilized human society.

== Activism ==
Starting in the 1970s, Brecher helped publish Root & Branch and Commonwork Pamphlets, which published his writings opposing reinstitution of the military draft. In the 1980s and 1990s he was active in the Campaign on Contingent Work, the North American Federation for Fair Employment, and the Naugatuck Valley Project. He was arrested for occupying the office of Rep. Nancy Johnson in a protest against the mining of Nicaragua harbors.

In the 2000s he helped organize the Iraq Pledge of Resistance, the Iraq Moratorium, War Crimes Watch, and Global Labor Strategies and with Jill Cutler and Brendan Smith edited the collection In the Name of Democracy: American War Crimes in Iraq and Beyond which Booklist described as an “excellent anthology” that includes “interviews, FBI documents, legal briefs, and statements by soldiers turned resisters, all offering a chilling look at how the war was begun and is currently operating.” In the 2010s he helped form Labor Network for Sustainability and the Connecticut Roundtable on Climate and Jobs. He helped support and wrote extensively about Occupy Wall Street. Brecher was arrested in the first KXL pipeline protests at the White House in 2011.

== Filmography ==
- Schools in Black and White (1991)
- The Roots of Roe (1994)
- Rust Valley (1995)
- African Americans in Connecticut: Civil War to Civil Rights (1998)

== Published works ==
- The Green New Deal from Below: How Ordinary People Are Building a Just and Climate-Safe Economy (Urbana, IL: University of Illinois Press, 2024) ISBN 9780252088278
- Common Preservation: In a Time of Mutual Destruction (Oakland, CA: PM Press, 2020) ISBN 9781629637884
- Strike! 50th Anniversary Edition (Oakland, CA: PM Press, 2020) ISBN 9781629638003
- Save the Humans? Common Preservation in Action Revised: Expanded and Updated Edition (Oakland, CA: PM Press, 2020) ISBN 9781629637983
- Against Doom: A Climate Insurgency Manual (Oakland, CA: PM Press, 2017) ISBN 9781629633855
- Climate Insurgency: A Strategy for Survival, (Boulder, CO: Paradigm publishers, 2015). ISBN 9781612058207
- Strike! Revised: Expanded, and updated edition (Oakland, CA: PM Press, 2014) ISBN 9780846703648
- Save the Humans? Common Preservation in Action (Boulder, CO: Paradigm publishers, 2012) ISBN 9781612050966
- Banded Together: Economic Democratization in the Brass Valley (Urbana: University of Illinois Press, 2011) ISBN 9780252036125
- In the Name of Democracy: American War Crimes in Iraq and Beyond (Edited with Jill Cutler and Brendan Smith) (New York: Metropolitan Books, 2005) ISBN 9780805079692
- Cornwall in Pictures: A Visual Reminiscence 1868-1941 (Cornwall, CT: Cornwall Historical Society, 2001) ISBN 9781931597005
- Globalization from Below: The Power of Solidarity (with Tim Costello and Brendan Smith) (Cambridge. South End Press, 2000) ISBN 9780896086227
- Global Visions: Beyond the New World Order (ed, with John Brown Childs and Jill Cutler) (Boston. South End Press, 1993) ISBN 9780896084612
- Global Village vs. Global Pillage: A One-World Strategy for Labor (with Tim Costello) (Washington, D.C. International Labor Rights Education and Research Fund, 1991) ISBN 978-1-880103-02-9
- Brass Valley: The Story of Working People's Lives and Struggles in an American Industrial Region (ed., with Jerry Lombardi and Jan Stackhouse) (Philadelphia. Temple University Press, 1982) ISBN 9780877222729
- Common Sense for Hard Times (Second Edition) (Washington, D.C./New York. Institute for Policy Studies/Two Continents Publishing Group, 1976 Boston/New York. South End Press/Two Continents Publishing Group, 1977) ISBN 9780896081093
