= Boston Trade High School for Boys =

High school in Boston, Massachusetts, United States

Coordinates: 42°20′7.78″N 71°5′38.75″W

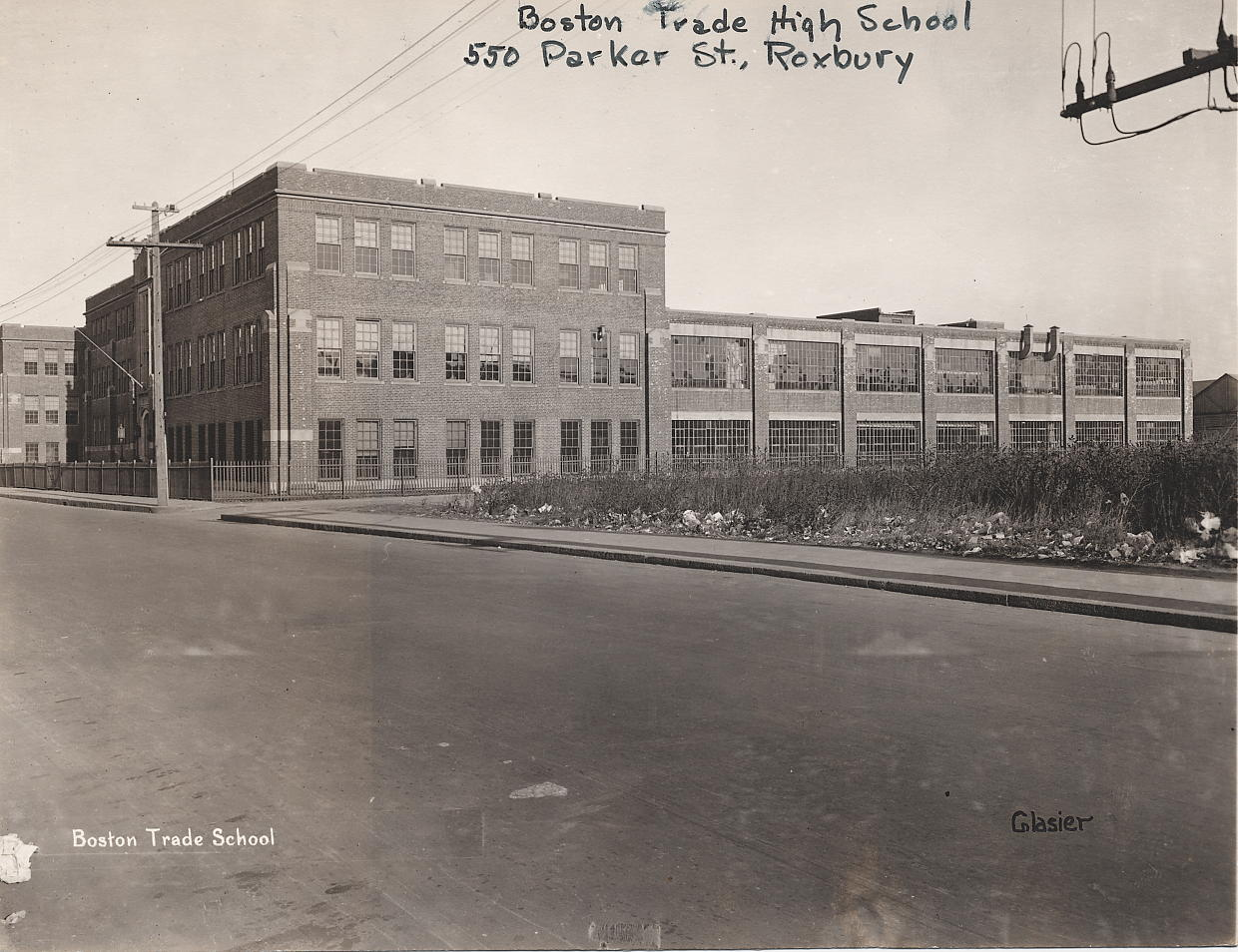
External view of the high school in the 1930s

The Boston Trade High School for Boys was a high school that was located in Roxbury, Boston. It was founded in 1929 and closed in 1980. The building was acquired by Wentworth Institute of Technology and called The Annex. Since 1984, the building has been hosting classes for Wentworth students and currently houses Wentworth’s Design and Facilities, Architecture, and Civil, Construction and Environment Departments.
