= 1975–1976 Massachusetts legislature =

169th Massachusetts General Court
←	168th	170th	→

Overview
- Legislative body: General Court
- Election: November 4, 1974

Senate
- Members: 40
- President: Kevin B. Harrington
- Majority Leader: Joseph DiCarlo
- Vice-Leader Majority of House of Representatives: Mary L. Fonseca
- Minority Leader: John Francis Parker
- Vice-Leader Minority: David H. Locke
- Party control: Democrat

House
- Members: 240
- Speaker: David M. Bartley (1975); Thomas W. McGee (1975–1976)
- Majority Leader: Thomas W. McGee (1975); William Q. MacLean Jr. (1975–1976)
- Vice-Majority: William Q. MacLean Jr. (1975); George Keverian (1975–1976)
- Minority Leader: Francis W. Hatch Jr.
- Vice-Leader Minority: William G. Robinson
- Party control: Democrat

Sessions
- 1st: January 1, 1975 – January 6, 1976
- 2nd: January 7, 1976 – October 14, 1976

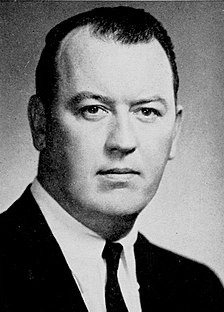
Kevin Harrington, Senate president.

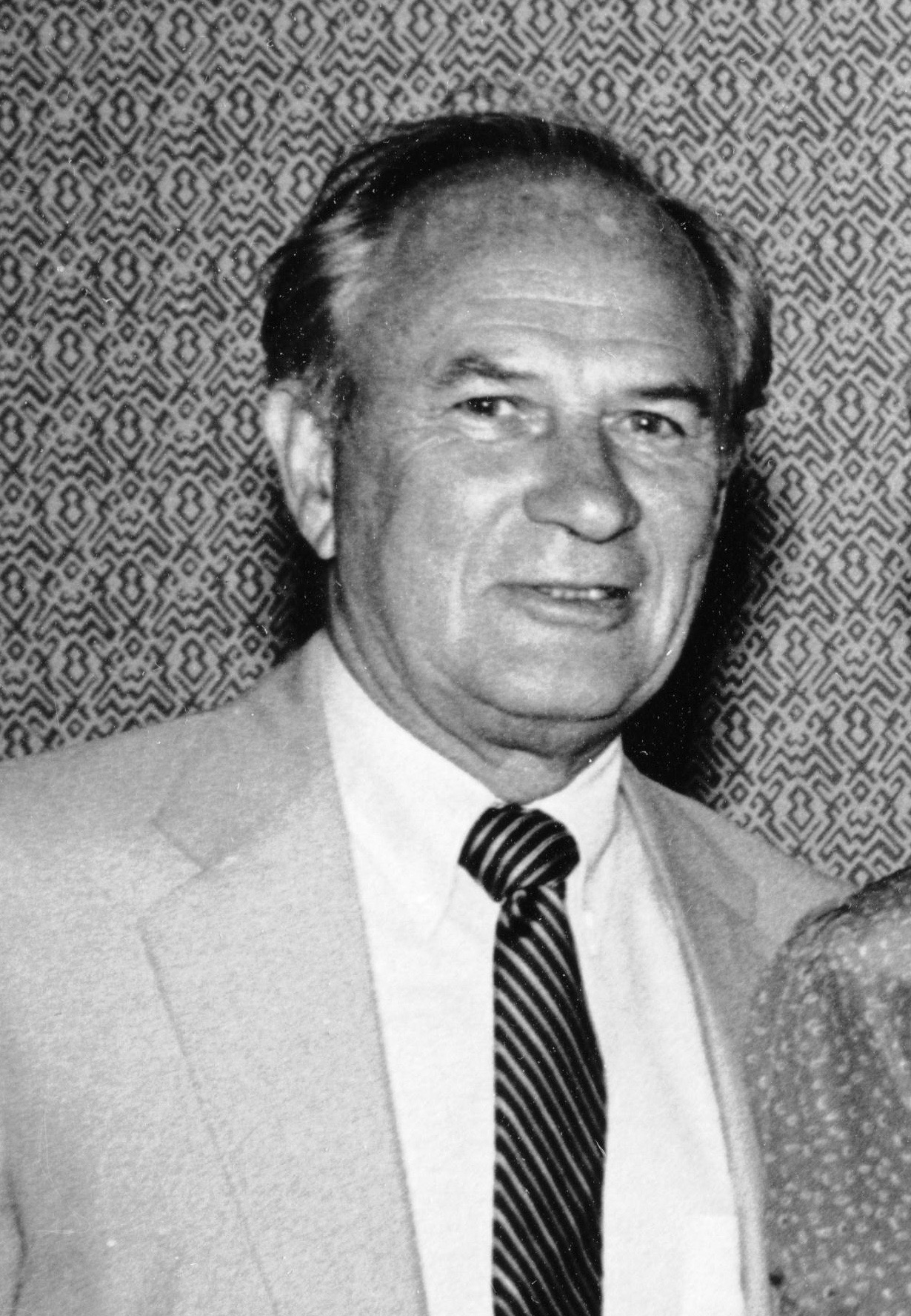
Thomas McGee, House speaker.

Leaders of the Massachusetts General Court, 1975.

The 169th Massachusetts General Court, consisting of the Massachusetts Senate and the Massachusetts House of Representatives, met in 1975 and 1976 during the governorship of Michael Dukakis. Kevin B. Harrington served as president of the Senate and Thomas W. McGee served as speaker of the House.

== Senators ==
portrait	name	date of birth	district
	Chester G. Atkins	April 14, 1948	
	John F. Aylmer	January 27, 1934	
	Jack Backman	April 26, 1922	
	Roger L. Bernashe	September 9, 1927	
	Walter J. Boverini	June 5, 1925	
	Anna Buckley	1924	
	William Bulger	February 2, 1934	
	John W. Bullock	March 13, 1929	
	Edward L. Burke	1942	
	John J. Conte	May 3, 1930	
	Joseph DiCarlo	March 21, 1936	
	Jack Fitzpatrick (businessman)	April 5, 1923	
	Daniel J. Foley	April 6, 1921	
	Mary L. Fonseca	March 30, 1915	
	Robert A. Hall	April 15, 1946	
	Kevin B. Harrington	January 9, 1929	
	James A. Kelly Jr.	May 11, 1926	
	Arthur Joseph Lewis Jr.	September 3, 1934	
	David H. Locke	August 4, 1927	
	Michael LoPresti Jr.	April 30, 1947	
	Ronald Conrad MacKenzie	May 3, 1934	5th Middlesex
	Francis X. McCann	September 2, 1912	
	Robert E. McCarthy	January 12, 1940	
	Stephen McGrail	September 23, 1948	
	Denis L. Mckenna	August 14, 1922	
	Allan R. McKinnon	June 2, 1930	
	John Olver	September 3, 1936	
	Bill Owens (Massachusetts politician)	July 6, 1937	
	John Francis Parker	May 29, 1907	
	George Rogers (Massachusetts politician)	August 2, 1933	
	James Paul Rurak	November 9, 1911	
	William L. Saltonstall	May 14, 1927	
	Frederic W. Schlosstein Jr.	March 17, 1923	
	Alan Sisitsky	June 4, 1942	
	Joseph F. Timilty (state senator)	October 3, 1938	
	Arthur Tobin	May 22, 1930	
	B. Joseph Tully	January 4, 1927	
	William X. Wall	July 1, 1904	
	Joseph B. Walsh	November 15, 1923	
	Stanley John Zarod	April 11, 1924	

== Representatives ==
portrait	name	date of birth	district
	Antone S. Aguiar Jr.	January 2, 1930	13th Bristol
	Theodore J. Aleixo Jr.	August 23, 1942	
	Alfred Almeida	October 5, 1931	
	Robert B. Ambler	1927	
	John S. Ames, III	October 18, 1936	
	Carol Amick		
	Peter George Asiaf	August 15, 1905	
	Wilfred E. Balthazar	July 17, 1914	
	David M. Bartley	February 9, 1935	
	Timothy A. Bassett	December 16, 1947	
	Wilfred P. Beauchesne	September 3, 1923	
	Louis Peter Bertonazzi	October 9, 1933	
	Francis Bevilacqua	August 12, 1923	
	Donald T. Bliss	1937	
	Belden Bly	September 29, 1914	
	Raymond J. Boffetti	1924	
	Robert Joseph Bohigian	July 24, 1922	
	Royal L. Bolling Jr.	May 1, 1944	
	George Bourque	1913	
	Joseph E. Brett	May 19, 1907	
	Thomas Brownell	March 25, 1940	
	John R. Buckley	1932	
	Robert C. Buell	April 23, 1931	
	Charles J. Buffone	1919	
	Nicholas J. Buglione	1932	
	Doris Bunte	July 2, 1933	
	Kevin M. Burke	December 7, 1946	
	Walter T. Burke	August 5, 1911	
	John Businger	February 5, 1945	
	Laurence R. Buxbaum	March 9, 1942	
	Sean Francis Cahillane	February 9, 1951	
	Howard C. Cahoon Jr.	December 31, 1944	
	Fred F. Cain	November 5, 1909	
	Eleanor Campobasso	August 10, 1923	
	Andrew Card	May 10, 1947	
	William A. Carey	January 28, 1920	
	Angelo R. Cataldo	November 12, 1917	
	Robert A. Cerasoli	July 12, 1947	
	Rudy Chmura	March 21, 1932	
	Steve T. Chmura	March 29, 1928	
	John F. Coffey	February 7, 1918	
	Gerald M. Cohen	February 22, 1934	
	Lincoln P. Cole Jr.	September 18, 1918	
	Andrew Collaro	March 21, 1910	
	James G. Collins	August 2, 1946	
	H. Thomas Colo	December 27, 1929	
	William Augustine Connell Jr.	November 17, 1922	
	Edward W. Connelly	August 2, 1919	
	Michael J. Connolly	April 20, 1947	
	James S. Conway	July 4, 1930	
	John Sydney Conway	August 19, 1927	
	Francis X. Coppinger	March 12, 1935	
	Leo R. Corazzini	February 17, 1930	
	Genevra R. Counihan	December 15, 1925	
	Edward P. Coury	October 19, 1927	
	Gilbert W. Cox Jr.	February 28, 1933	
	James J. Craven Jr.	March 24, 1919	
	Michael C. Creedon	November 3, 1946	
	Thomas E. Creighton	February 1, 1922	
	Sidney Curtiss	September 4, 1917	
	John F. Cusack	October 5, 1937	
	Michael John Daly	July 18, 1940	
	Alan Paul Danovitch	September 17, 1940	
	William D. Delahunt		
	Richard H. Demers	January 19, 1928	
	Arthur Leo Desrocher	January 25, 1930	
	Edward M. Dickson	March 12, 1912	
	Brian J. Donnelly	March 2, 1946	
	Robert F. Donovan	September 13, 1936	
	Francis D. Doris	1931	
	John R. Driscoll	May 9, 1924	
	Dennis J. Duffin	November 24, 1930	
	Richard J. Dwinell	August 5, 1917	
	Edward J. Early Jr.	July 23, 1931	
	Charles F. Engdahl	July 3, 1921	
	Thomas Francis Fallon	December 4, 1929	
	Mary Fantasia	October 1, 1919	
	John F. Farland	May 14, 1940	
	Michael Paul Feeney	March 26, 1907	
	Philip Frank Filosa	July 6, 1948	
	John J. Finnegan	July 21, 1938	
	Richard F. Finnigan	September 27, 1936	
	Kevin W. Fitzgerald	1950	
	Charles Flaherty (politician)	October 13, 1938	
	Michael F. Flaherty Sr.	September 6, 1936	
	Raymond Flynn	July 22, 1939	
	Bernard D. Flynn	April 11, 1945	
	Peter Y. Flynn	1940	
	William J. Flynn Jr.	1933	
	Robert I. Fortes		
	Barney Frank	March 31, 1940	
	Bruce N. Freeman	March 4, 1921	
	James J. Gaffney III	December 20, 1942	
	Anthony Michael Gallugi	May 16, 1948	
	Edward F. Galotti	May 11, 1925	
	William F. Galvin	September 17, 1950	
	Ann Gannett	November 7, 1916	
	Joseph Garczynski Jr.	February 14, 1927	
	Donald R. Gaudette	December 16, 1926	
	Robert W. Gillette	September 1, 1934	
	Mary Goode	July 2, 1927	
	Paul M. Goulston	August 1, 1932	
	Barbara Gray	October 11, 1926	
	Henry Grenier	December 9, 1924	
	James L. Grimaldi	May 3, 1911	
	Gerard A. Guilmette	October 22, 1911	
	Edward D. Harrington Jr.	August 11, 1921	
	Peter F. Harrington	February 12, 1936	
	Norris W. Harris	March 16, 1915	
	Francis W. Hatch Jr.	May 6, 1925	
	Jonathan Healy	October 10, 1945	
	Daniel J. Henderson		
	William Francis Hogan	June 6, 1925	
	Iris Holland	September 30, 1920	
	Marie Elizabeth Howe	June 13, 1939	
	James P. Hurrell	March 1, 1944	
	Philip W. Johnston	July 21, 1944	
	Gary D. Jones		
	Raymond A. Jordan Jr.	May 5, 1943	
	Daniel L. Joyce Jr.	May 14, 1934	
	Dennis J. Kearney	September 25, 1949	
	James A. Keefe Jr.		
	John G. Kelleher		
	Richard Kendall	August 21, 1934	
	Robert B. Kennedy	February 6, 1940	
	George Keverian	June 3, 1931	
	Arthur M. Khoury	February 5, 1940	
	John G. King (politician)	November 30, 1942	
	Mel King	October 20, 1928	
	William I. Kitterman	July 19, 1928	
	Matthew J. Kuss	December 5, 1915	
	Raymond M. LaFontaine	May 18, 1927	
	Nickolas Lambros	January 9, 1933	
	Richard E. Landry	May 29, 1936	
	David Lane (Massachusetts politician)	July 6, 1927	
	Donat J. Laplante	August 12, 1913	
	Francis C. Lapointe	January 13, 1939	
	Peter H. Lappin	September 25, 1938	
	Michael E. McLaughlin	October 27, 1945	
	Mark E. Lawton	July 26, 1949	
	Edward LeLacheur	June 1, 1925	
	Gerald P. Lombard	January 4, 1916	
	Michael J. Lombardi	May 27, 1917	
	Charles W. Long	August 14, 1940	
	John J. Long	December 10, 1927	
	Thomas D. Lopes	September 7, 1942	
	Garreth J. Lynch	March 13, 1943	
	Charles A. MacKenzie Jr.	February 4, 1919	
	William Q. MacLean Jr.	November 4, 1934	
	Thomas H. D. Mahoney	November 4, 1913	
	M. Joseph Manning	September 23, 1924	
	Donald J. Manning	June 23, 1929	
	Robert Manzelli		
	Ed Markey	July 11, 1946	
	Angelo Marotta	October 16, 1937	
	Frank J. Matrango	July 19, 1926	
	Anthony P. McBride	August 28, 1932	
	Peter C. McCarthy	September 8, 1941	
	Terrence P. McCarthy	August 12, 1941	
	Peter L. McDowell		
	Thomas W. McGee	May 24, 1924	
	Charles M. McGowan	November 13, 1923	
	Richard J. McGrath		
	Richard M. McGrath	April 4, 1931	
	Arthur James McKenna	October 29, 1914	
	Robert D. McNeil	December 16, 1930	
	Paul E. Means	June 18, 1945	
	John F. Melia	June 5, 1915	
	Elizabeth Metayer	August 12, 1911	
	David J. Mofenson	February 7, 1943	
	Paul F. X. Moriarty	August 18, 1929	
	John E. Murphy Jr.	April 3, 1943	
	William P. Nagle Jr.	June 10, 1951	
	Andrew Natsios	September 22, 1949	
	Joseph M. Navin	May 19, 1946	
	Lou Nickinello	September 8, 1940	
	Elaine Noble	January 22, 1944	
	James R. Nolen	April 17, 1933	
	Nils L. Nordberg	November 6, 1934	
	Thomas C. Norton	December 11, 1934	
	James Anthony O'Brien Jr.	June 22, 1919	
	Henry J. O'Donnell	March 13, 1940	
	James E. O'Leary	April 7, 1933	
	O. Roland Orlandi	March 25, 1936	
	Robert Owens	October 7, 1946	
	Raymond S. Peck	December 10, 1922	
	Robert M. Penta		
	Felix Perrault	October 27, 1915	
	John B. Perry	February 15, 1935	
	Robert G. Phelan	March 19, 1933	
	William A. Pickett	June 10, 1935	
	Angelo Picucci	April 12, 1915	
	Ronald Anthony Pina	August 11, 1944	
	Lois Pines	August 16, 1940	
	Vincent J. Piro	1931	
	Daniel F. Pokaski	June 26, 1949	
	Manuel Raposa Jr.	May 13, 1915	
	Robert C. Reynolds	November 6, 1934	
	William G. Robinson	March 10, 1926	
	A. David Rodham	November 26, 1938	
	Andrew J. Rogers Jr.	May 6, 1944	
	Francis E. Rogers	July 18, 1932	
	Richard A. Rogers	July 8, 1930	
	Robert J. Rohan	August 15, 1921	
	Maurice E. Ronayne Jr.	November 16, 1917	
	Raymond F. Rourke	October 10, 1917	
	J. Michael Ruane	December 10, 1927	
	John Rucho	November 22, 1922	
	Frederick Dello Russo	December 14, 1943	
	Alfred E. Saggese Jr.	November 21, 1946	
	Sherman Saltmarsh	April 27, 1929	
	Angelo Scaccia	September 29, 1942	
	Joseph Scelsi	June 4, 1915	
	Anthony M. Scibelli	October 16, 1911	
	James W. Segel	June 29, 1945	
	Joseph J. Semensi	March 6, 1923	
	Emanuel Serra	June 12, 1945	
	William G. Shaughnessy	July 10, 1918	
	C. Vincent Shea	November 20, 1916	
	Philip L. Shea	October 19, 1941	
	James A. Sheets	June 3, 1935	
	Edward Shortell	August 21, 1916	
	Richard R. Silva	March 13, 1922	
	Thomas G. Simons	January 21, 1942	
	James E. Smith	September 3, 1946	
	George R. Sprague	June 19, 1938	
	William A. Starzec	October 14, 1918	
	Gregory W. Sullivan	January 29, 1952	
	Karen Swanson	January 15, 1954	
	David J. Swartz	April 2, 1931	
	Robert S. Teahan	March 1, 1921	
	John Joseph Toomey	March 25, 1909	
	Theodore J. Trudeau	January 22, 1916	
	Peter A. Velis	October 8, 1942	
	Robert A. Vigneau	November 4, 1920	
	Carlton M. Viveiros	December 4, 1938	
	Max Volterra	January 7, 1936	
	Henry A. Walker	December 7, 1919	
	Norman S. Weinberg	1919	
	Bruce E. Wetherbee	September 1, 1950	
	Robert D. Wetmore	July 24, 1930	
	W. Paul White	July 7, 1945	
	Thomas P. White	August 27, 1950	
	Bernard Wilber		
	George L. Woods Jr.	March 28, 1925	
	George Chester Young	September 18, 1912	
	Bruce H. Zeiser		

== Images ==
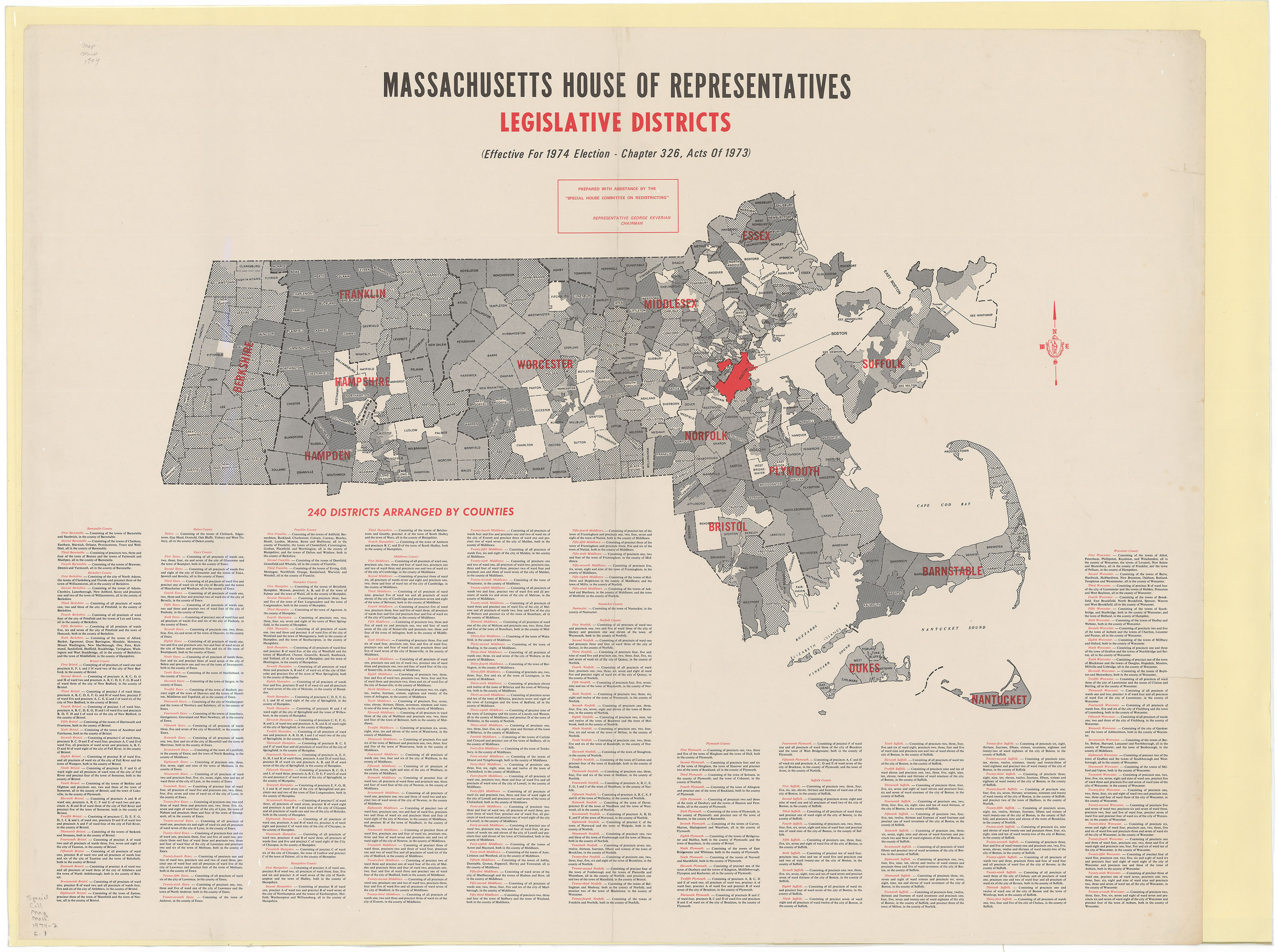
Map of 240 districts of the Massachusetts House of Representatives apportioned in 1973

== See also ==
- 94th United States Congress
- List of Massachusetts General Courts
