= 1973–1974 Massachusetts legislature =

168th Massachusetts General Court
←	167th	169th	→

Overview
- Legislative body: General Court
- Term: January 3, 1973 – August 2, 1974

Senate
- Members: 40
- President: Kevin B. Harrington
- Majority Leader: Mario Umana
- Vice Majority: Joseph DiCarlo
- Minority Leader: John Francis Parker
- Minority Vice: David H. Locke
- Party control: Democrat

House
- Members: 240
- Speaker: David M. Bartley
- Majority Leader of House of Representatives: Thomas W. McGee
- Vice Majority of House of Representatives: William Q. MacLean Jr.
- Minority Leader in House of Representatives: Francis W. Hatch Jr.
- Vice Assistant Minority of House of Representatives: William G. Robinson
- Party control: Democrat

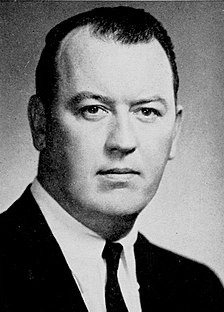
Kevin Harrington, Senate president.

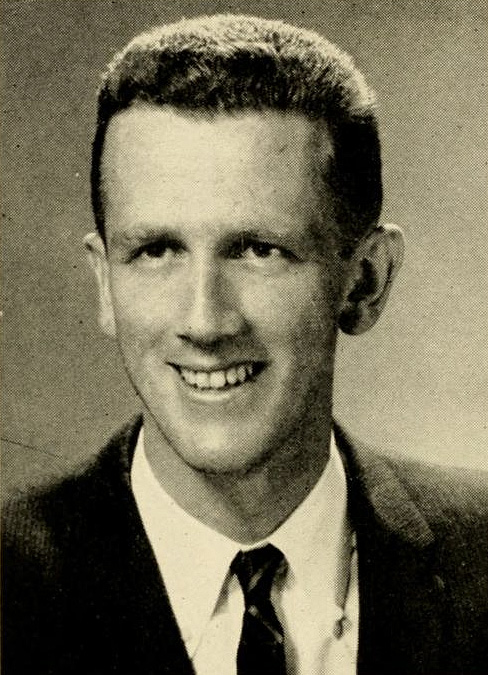
David Bartley, House speaker.

Leaders of the Massachusetts General Court, 1973-1974.

The 168th Massachusetts General Court, consisting of the Massachusetts Senate and the Massachusetts House of Representatives, met in 1973 and 1974 during the governorship of Francis Sargent. Kevin B. Harrington served as president of the Senate and David M. Bartley served as speaker of the House.

== Senators ==
portrait	name	date of birth	district
	Chester G. Atkins	April 14, 1948	5th Middlesex
	John F. Aylmer	January 27, 1934	
	Jack Backman	April 26, 1922	
	Roger L. Bernashe	September 9, 1927	
	Walter J. Boverini	June 5, 1925	
	Anna Buckley	1924	
	William Bulger	February 2, 1934	
	John W. Bullock	March 13, 1929	
	Edward L. Burke	1942	
	John J. Conte	May 3, 1930	
	Joseph DiCarlo	March 21, 1936	
	Irving Fishman	March 29, 1921	
	Daniel J. Foley	April 6, 1921	
	Mary L. Fonseca	March 30, 1915	
	Robert A. Hall	April 15, 1946	
	Kevin B. Harrington	January 9, 1929	
	James A. Kelly Jr.	May 11, 1926	
	Arthur Joseph Lewis Jr.	September 3, 1934	
	David H. Locke	August 4, 1927	
	Ronald Conrad MacKenzie	May 3, 1934	
	Francis X. McCann	September 2, 1912	
	Stephen McGrail	September 23, 1948	
	Denis L. Mckenna	August 14, 1922	
	Allan R. McKinnon	June 2, 1930	
	George G. Mendonca	March 26, 1924	
	Andrea F. Nuciforo Sr.	July 14, 1927	
	John Olver	September 3, 1936	
	John Francis Parker	May 29, 1907	
	John M. Quinlan	July 11, 1935	
	James Paul Rurak	November 9, 1911	
	William L. Saltonstall	May 14, 1927	
	Frederic W. Schlosstein Jr.	March 17, 1923	
	Alan Sisitsky	June 4, 1942	
	Joseph F. Timilty (state senator)	October 3, 1938	
	Arthur Tobin	May 22, 1930	
	B. Joseph Tully	January 4, 1927	
	Mario Umana	May 5, 1914	
	William X. Wall	July 1, 1904	
	Joseph B. Walsh	November 15, 1923	
	Stanley John Zarod	April 11, 1924	

== Representatives ==
portrait	name	date of birth	district
	Antone S. Aguiar Jr.	January 2, 1930	10th Bristol
	Theodore J. Aleixo Jr.	August 23, 1942	
	Alfred Almeida	October 5, 1931	
	Robert B. Ambler	1927	
	John S. Ames, III	October 18, 1936	
	Frank A. Antonelli	August 20, 1924	
	Peter George Asiaf	August 15, 1905	
	Roger Sumner Babb	1935	
	Wilfred E. Balthazar	July 17, 1914	
	David M. Bartley	February 9, 1935	
	Louis Peter Bertonazzi	October 9, 1933	
	Francis Bevilacqua	August 12, 1923	
	Donald T. Bliss	1937	
	Belden Bly	September 29, 1914	
	Raymond J. Boffetti	1924	
	Robert Joseph Bohigian	July 24, 1922	
	Royal L. Bolling Sr.		
	Royal L. Bolling Jr.		
	George Bourque	1913	
	John Jerome Bowes	February 25, 1917	
	Joseph E. Brett	May 19, 1907	
	Thomas Brownell	March 25, 1940	
	John R. Buckley	1932	
	Robert C. Buell	April 23, 1931	
	Charles J. Buffone	1919	
	Nicholas J. Buglione	1932	
	Doris Bunte	July 2, 1933	
	Walter T. Burke	August 5, 1911	
	John A. Businger		
	Thomas Bussone	September 20, 1912	
	Laurence R. Buxbaum	March 9, 1942	
	Howard C. Cahoon Jr.	December 31, 1944	
	Fred F. Cain	November 5, 1909	
	Eleanor Campobasso	August 10, 1923	
	Angelo R. Cataldo	November 12, 1917	
	Harrison Chadwick	February 25, 1903	
	Rudy Chmura	March 21, 1932	
	Steve T. Chmura	March 29, 1928	
	John F. Coffey	February 7, 1918	
	Lincoln P. Cole Jr.	September 18, 1918	
	James G. Collins	August 2, 1946	
	H. Thomas Colo	December 27, 1929	
	Edward W. Connelly	August 2, 1919	
	James S. Conway	July 4, 1930	
	Edward P. Coury	October 19, 1927	
	Gilbert W. Cox Jr.	February 28, 1933	
	James J. Craven Jr.	March 24, 1919	
	Thomas E. Creighton	February 1, 1922	
	Sidney Curtiss	September 4, 1917	
	John F. Cusack	October 5, 1937	
	Joseph S. Daly	October 26, 1931	
	Alan Paul Danovitch	September 17, 1940	
	Richard H. Demers	January 19, 1928	
	Arthur Leo Desrocher	January 25, 1930	
	Edward M. Dickson	March 12, 1912	
	William J. Dignan	September 28, 1926	
	Robert F. Donovan	September 13, 1936	
	Charles Robert Doyle	September 24, 1925	
	Dennis J. Duffin	November 24, 1930	
	Richard J. Dwinell	August 5, 1917	
	Joseph D. Early	January 31, 1933	
	Albert E. Elwell	October 29, 1899	
	Thomas Francis Fallon	December 4, 1929	
	Vernon R. Farnsworth Jr.	April 18, 1934	
	John J. Finnegan	July 21, 1938	
	Richard F. Finnigan	September 27, 1936	
	Charles Flaherty (politician)	October 13, 1938	
	Michael F. Flaherty Sr.	September 6, 1936	
	Peter Y. Flynn	1940	
	Barney Frank	March 31, 1940	
	Bruce N. Freeman	March 4, 1921	
	Anthony Michael Gallugi	May 16, 1948	
	Edward F. Galotti	May 11, 1925	
	Ann Gannett	November 7, 1916	
	Joseph Garczynski Jr.	February 14, 1927	
	Donald R. Gaudette	December 16, 1926	
	Robert W. Gillette	September 1, 1934	
	Barbara Gray	October 11, 1926	
	Henry Grenier	December 9, 1924	
	Edward J. Grimley Jr.	December 26, 1943	
	Anthony P. Grosso	October 19, 1913	
	Paul Guzzi	June 17, 1942	
	Edward D. Harrington Jr.	August 11, 1921	
	Norris W. Harris	March 16, 1915	
	Francis W. Hatch Jr.	May 6, 1925	
	Jonathan Healy	October 10, 1945	
	Iris Holland	September 30, 1920	
	Marie Elizabeth Howe	June 13, 1939	
	James P. Hurrell	March 1, 1944	
	Daniel L. Joyce Jr.	May 14, 1934	
	Richard Kendall	August 21, 1934	
	George Keverian	June 3, 1931	
	Arthur M. Khoury	February 5, 1940	
	Cornelius F. Kiernan	August 15, 1917	
	John G. King (politician)	November 30, 1942	
	Mel King	October 20, 1928	
	William I. Kitterman	July 19, 1928	
	Raymond M. LaFontaine	May 18, 1927	
	Nickolas Lambros	January 9, 1933	
	Richard E. Landry	May 29, 1936	
	David Lane (Massachusetts politician)	July 6, 1927	
	Peter H. Lappin	September 25, 1938	
	Michael E. McLaughlin	October 27, 1945	
	David J. Lionett	October 3, 1943	
	Alexander Lolas	July 9, 1932	
	Gerald P. Lombard	January 4, 1916	
	Charles W. Long	August 14, 1940	
	John J. Long	December 10, 1927	
	John Loring	1926	
	Garreth J. Lynch	March 13, 1943	
	Frederick M. MacDonald	August 3, 1924	
	Charles A. MacKenzie Jr.	February 4, 1919	
	William Q. MacLean Jr.	November 4, 1934	
	Thomas H. D. Mahoney	November 4, 1913	
	M. Joseph Manning	September 23, 1924	
	Donald J. Manning	June 23, 1929	
	Clifford Marshall	December 14, 1937	
	Peter L. Masnik	March 13, 1942	
	Frank J. Matrango	July 19, 1926	
	Anthony P. McBride	August 28, 1932	
	Robert E. McCarthy	January 12, 1940	
	Peter C. McCarthy	September 8, 1941	
	Terrence P. McCarthy	August 12, 1941	
	Edward A. McColgan	March 20, 1932	
	Thomas W. McGee	May 24, 1924	
	Robert J. McGinn	December 18, 1918	
	Charles M. McGowan	November 13, 1923	
	Richard M. McGrath	April 4, 1931	
	Arthur James McKenna	October 29, 1914	
	John C. McNeil	June 8, 1945	
	David J. Mofenson	February 7, 1943	
	Paul F. Murphy	October 14, 1932	
	John J. Navin	September 9, 1915	
	Thomas C. Norton	December 11, 1934	
	James Anthony O'Brien Jr.	June 22, 1919	
	Kenneth M. O'Brien	February 5, 1951	
	Henry J. O'Donnell	March 13, 1940	
	James E. O'Leary	April 7, 1933	
	Thomas P. O'Neill III	1944	
	Carl R. Ohlson	June 4, 1925	
	O. Roland Orlandi	March 25, 1936	
	Bill Owens (Massachusetts politician)	July 6, 1937	
	Robert Owens	October 7, 1946	
	Raymond S. Peck	December 10, 1922	
	Felix Perrault	October 27, 1915	
	Robert G. Phelan	March 19, 1933	
	Angelo Picucci	April 12, 1915	
	Robert C. Reynolds	November 6, 1934	
	William G. Robinson	March 10, 1926	
	Maurice E. Ronayne Jr.	November 16, 1917	
	Jon Rotenberg	October 21, 1947	
	Raymond F. Rourke	October 10, 1917	
	John Rucho	November 22, 1922	
	William H. Ryan	July 17, 1938	
	George Sacco	July 19, 1936	
	Angelo Scaccia	September 29, 1942	
	Anthony James Scalli	November 11, 1914	
	Joseph Scelsi	June 4, 1915	
	Anthony M. Scibelli	October 16, 1911	
	Emanuel Serra	June 12, 1945	
	George W. Shattuck	July 17, 1916	
	C. Vincent Shea	November 20, 1916	
	Edward Shortell	August 21, 1916	
	Richard R. Silva	March 13, 1922	
	Thomas G. Simons	January 21, 1942	
	Ralph E. Sirianni Jr.	1923	
	William J. Spence	May 4, 1930	
	George R. Sprague	June 19, 1938	
	William A. Starzec	October 14, 1918	
	John Joseph Toomey	March 25, 1909	
	Daniel C. Towse	December 5, 1924	
	Robert A. Vigneau	November 4, 1920	
	Carlton M. Viveiros	December 4, 1938	
	Henry A. Walker	December 7, 1919	
	Norman S. Weinberg	1919	
	Robert D. Wetmore	July 24, 1930	
	George L. Woods Jr.	March 28, 1925	
	George Chester Young	September 18, 1912	

== See also ==
- 93rd United States Congress
- List of Massachusetts General Courts
