= 1977–1978 Massachusetts legislature =

170th Massachusetts General Court
←	169th	171st	→

Overview
- Legislative body: General Court
- Term: January 5, 1977 – July 12, 1978

Senate
- Members: 40
- President: Kevin B. Harrington
- Majority leader of House of Representatives: Joseph DiCarlo (1977); William Bulger (1977–1978)
- Vice-Leader Majority of House of Representatives: Mary L. Fonseca
- Minority Leader: John Francis Parker
- Vice-Leader Minority: David H. Locke
- Party control: Democrat

House
- Members: 240
- Speaker: Thomas W. McGee
- Majority Leader of State Senate: William Q. MacLean Jr.
- Vice-Leader Majority of State Senate: George Keverian
- Minority Leader of State Senate: Francis W. Hatch Jr.
- Vice-Leader Minority of State Senate: William G. Robinson
- Party control: Democrat

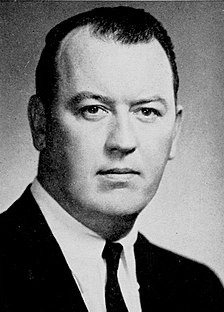
Kevin Harrington, Senate president.

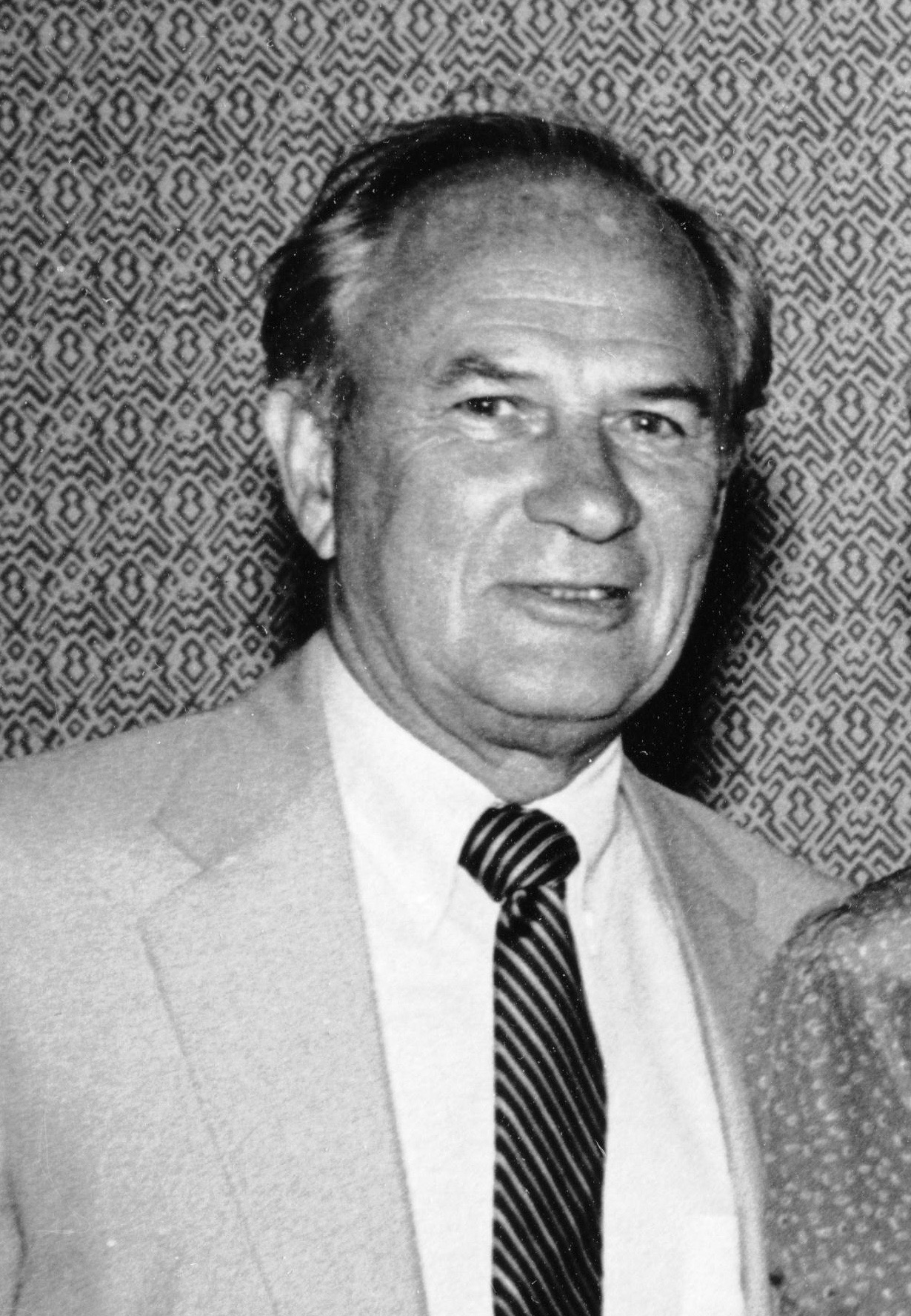
Thomas McGee, House speaker.

Leaders of the Massachusetts General Court, 1977-1978.

The 170th Massachusetts General Court, consisting of the Massachusetts Senate and the Massachusetts House of Representatives, met in 1977 and 1978 during the governorship of Michael Dukakis. Kevin B. Harrington served as president of the Senate and Thomas W. McGee served as speaker of the House.

== Senators ==
portrait	name	date of birth	district
	Carol Amick		5th Middlesex
	Chester G. Atkins	April 14, 1948	
	John F. Aylmer	January 27, 1934	
	Jack Backman	April 26, 1922	
	Roger L. Bernashe	September 9, 1927	
	Walter J. Boverini	June 5, 1925	
	John A. Brennan Jr.	September 19, 1945	
	Anna Buckley	1924	
	William Bulger	February 2, 1934	
	Edward L. Burke	1942	
	Gerard D'Amico	July 27, 1947	
	Joseph DiCarlo	March 21, 1936	
	Jack Fitzpatrick	April 5, 1923	
	Daniel J. Foley	April 6, 1921	
	Mary L. Fonseca	March 30, 1915	
	Robert A. Hall	April 15, 1946	
	Kevin B. Harrington	January 9, 1929	
	James A. Kelly Jr.	May 11, 1926	
	Arthur Joseph Lewis Jr.	September 3, 1934	
	David H. Locke	August 4, 1927	
	Michael LoPresti Jr.	April 30, 1947	
	Ronald Conrad MacKenzie	May 3, 1934	
	Frank J. Mastrocola Jr.		
	Francis X. McCann	September 2, 1912	
	Robert E. McCarthy	January 12, 1940	
	Denis L. Mckenna	August 14, 1922	
	Allan R. McKinnon	June 2, 1930	
	John Olver	September 3, 1936	
	Bill Owens	July 6, 1937	
	John Francis Parker	May 29, 1907	
	Sharon Pollard	September 21, 1950	
	George Rogers	August 2, 1933	
	Samuel Rotondi	April 22, 1946	
	William L. Saltonstall	May 14, 1927	
	Alan Sisitsky	June 4, 1942	
	Joseph F. Timilty	October 3, 1938	
	Arthur Tobin	May 22, 1930	
	B. Joseph Tully	January 4, 1927	
	William X. Wall	July 1, 1904	
	Joseph B. Walsh	November 15, 1923	
	Robert D. Wetmore	July 24, 1930	
	Stanley John Zarod	April 11, 1924	

== Representatives ==
portrait	name	date of birth	district
	Antone S. Aguiar Jr.	January 2, 1930	13th Bristol
	Theodore J. Aleixo Jr.	August 23, 1942	
	Alfred Almeida	October 5, 1931	
	Robert B. Ambler	1927	
	Carol Amick		
	Peter George Asiaf	August 15, 1905	
	Dennis J. Baker	August 19, 1948	
	Stanley E. Barnicoat	February 5, 1927	
	Timothy A. Bassett	December 16, 1947	
	Wilfred P. Beauchesne	September 3, 1923	
	Louis Peter Bertonazzi	October 9, 1933	
	Francis Bevilacqua	August 12, 1923	
	Walter Bickford	February 16, 1942	
	Belden Bly	September 29, 1914	
	Raymond J. Boffetti	1924	
	Robert Joseph Bohigian	July 24, 1922	
	Royal L. Bolling Jr.	May 1, 1944	
	George Bourque	1913	
	Thomas Brownell	March 25, 1940	
	Robert C. Buell	April 23, 1931	
	Charles J. Buffone	1919	
	Nicholas J. Buglione	1932	
	Doris Bunte	July 2, 1933	
	Kevin M. Burke	December 7, 1946	
	Walter T. Burke	August 5, 1911	
	John Businger	February 5, 1945	
	Sean Francis Cahillane	February 9, 1951	
	Jeremiah F. Cahir	December 4, 1924	
	Howard C. Cahoon Jr.	December 31, 1944	
	Fred F. Cain	November 5, 1909	
	Eleanor Campobasso	August 10, 1923	
	Andrew Card	May 10, 1947	
	William A. Carey	January 28, 1920	
	Robert F. X. Casey	April 14, 1925	
	Angelo R. Cataldo	November 12, 1917	
	Paul Cellucci	April 24, 1948	
	Robert A. Cerasoli	July 12, 1947	
	Rudy Chmura	March 21, 1932	
	Salvatore Ciccarelli	February 16, 1941	
	John F. Coffey	February 7, 1918	
	Gerald M. Cohen	February 22, 1934	
	Lincoln P. Cole Jr.	September 18, 1918	
	Andrew Collaro	March 21, 1910	
	James G. Collins	August 2, 1946	
	H. Thomas Colo	December 27, 1929	
	Edward W. Connelly	August 2, 1919	
	Michael J. Connolly	April 20, 1947	
	John Sydney Conway	August 19, 1927	
	Leo R. Corazzini	February 17, 1930	
	Robert Correia	January 3, 1939	
	Genevra Counihan	December 15, 1925	
	Edward P. Coury	October 19, 1927	
	James J. Craven Jr.	March 24, 1919	
	Michael C. Creedon	November 3, 1946	
	Sidney Curtiss	September 4, 1917	
	John F. Cusack	October 5, 1937	
	Charles Decas	October 5, 1937	
	Richard H. Demers	January 19, 1928	
	A. Joseph DeNucci	August 30, 1939	
	Michael J. Devito	May 30, 1949	
	Edward M. Dickson	March 12, 1912	
	Brian J. Donnelly	March 2, 1946	
	Francis D. Doris	1931	
	Charles Robert Doyle	September 24, 1925	
	John R. Driscoll	May 9, 1924	
	Dennis J. Duffin	November 24, 1930	
	Richard J. Dwinell	August 5, 1917	
	Charles F. Engdahl	July 3, 1921	
	Thomas Francis Fallon	December 4, 1929	
	Mary Fantasia	October 1, 1919	
	John F. Farland	May 14, 1940	
	Leo J. Farley Jr.	June 1, 1926	
	Michael Paul Feeney	March 26, 1907	
	Philip Frank Filosa	July 6, 1948	
	John J. Finnegan	July 21, 1938	
	Richard F. Finnigan	September 27, 1936	
	Kevin W. Fitzgerald	1950	
	Mark Fitzsimmons	March 15, 1951	
	Charles Flaherty	October 13, 1938	
	Michael F. Flaherty Sr.	September 6, 1936	
	Raymond Flynn	July 22, 1939	
	Bernard D. Flynn	April 11, 1945	
	Peter Y. Flynn	1940	
	William J. Flynn Jr.	1933	
	Barney Frank	March 31, 1940	
	Bruce N. Freeman	March 4, 1921	
	James J. Gaffney III	December 20, 1942	
	Anthony Michael Gallugi	May 16, 1948	
	William F. Galvin	September 17, 1950	
	John B. Galvin	February 3, 1930	
	Ann Gannett	November 7, 1916	
	Henry S. Gillet Jr.	September 13, 1944	
	Robert W. Gillette	September 1, 1934	
	Mary Goode	July 2, 1927	
	Paul M. Goulston	August 1, 1932	
	Roger R. Goyette	January 22, 1925	
	Saundra Graham	September 5, 1941	
	John Granara	January 23, 1943	
	Barbara Gray	October 11, 1926	
	Henry Grenier	December 9, 1924	
	James L. Grimaldi	May 3, 1911	
	Gerard A. Guilmette	October 22, 1911	
	Edward D. Harrington Jr.	August 11, 1921	
	Peter F. Harrington	February 12, 1936	
	Norris W. Harris	March 16, 1915	
	Francis W. Hatch Jr.	May 6, 1925	
	Jonathan Healy	October 10, 1945	
	Joseph N. Hermann	June 8, 1924	
	Iris Holland	September 30, 1920	
	Marie Elizabeth Howe	June 13, 1939	
	Philip W. Johnston	July 21, 1944	
	Raymond A. Jordan Jr.	May 5, 1943	
	Dennis J. Kearney	September 25, 1949	
	Bill Keating	September 6, 1952	
	James A. Keefe Jr.		
	Richard Kendall	August 21, 1934	
	Robert B. Kennedy	February 6, 1940	
	George Keverian	June 3, 1931	
	Arthur M. Khoury	February 5, 1940	
	John G. King	November 30, 1942	
	Mel King	October 20, 1928	
	Matthew J. Kuss	December 5, 1915	
	Raymond M. LaFontaine	May 18, 1927	
	Nickolas Lambros	January 9, 1933	
	David Lane	July 6, 1927	
	Donat J. Laplante	August 12, 1913	
	Francis C. Lapointe	January 13, 1939	
	Robert F. Larkin Jr.	May 29, 1955	
	Mark E. Lawton	July 26, 1949	
	Edward LeLacheur	June 1, 1925	
	Kenneth M. Lemanski	January 27, 1954	
	Paula Lewellen		
	Gerald P. Lombard	January 4, 1916	
	Leon Lombardi	April 16, 1949	
	Michael J. Lombardi	May 27, 1917	
	Charles W. Long	August 14, 1940	
	John J. Long	December 10, 1927	
	Thomas D. Lopes	September 7, 1942	
	John Loring	1926	
	Edwin C. Lucey	March 18, 1932	
	Thomas Lussier	April 5, 1957	
	Thomas K. Lynch	April 30, 1946	
	Garreth J. Lynch	March 13, 1943	
	William Q. MacLean Jr.	November 4, 1934	
	Joseph T. Maguire	June 10, 1926	
	Thomas H. D. Mahoney	November 4, 1913	
	M. Joseph Manning	September 23, 1924	
	Donald J. Manning	June 23, 1929	
	Angelo Marotta	October 16, 1937	
	Frank J. Matrango	July 19, 1926	
	Anthony P. McBride	August 28, 1932	
	Peter C. McCarthy	September 8, 1941	
	Terrence P. McCarthy	August 12, 1941	
	Peter McDowell	June 5, 1938	
	Thomas W. McGee	May 24, 1924	
	Michael J. McGlynn	April 23, 1953	
	Arthur James McKenna	October 29, 1914	
	Bruce J. McLaughlin	February 2, 1935	
	Charles F. McNally	April 3, 1929	
	John C. McNeil	June 8, 1945	
	Robert D. McNeil	December 16, 1930	
	Paul E. Means	June 18, 1945	
	John F. Melia	June 5, 1915	
	Elizabeth Metayer	August 12, 1911	
	Jim Miceli	March 25, 1935	
	Alfred A. Minahan Jr.	September 14, 1953	
	David J. Mofenson	February 7, 1943	
	Richard T. Moore	August 7, 1943	
	Paul F. X. Moriarty	August 18, 1929	
	Michael W. Morrissey	August 2, 1954	
	William D. Mullins	August 13, 1931	
	John E. Murphy Jr.	April 3, 1943	
	Mary Jeanette Murray	December 24, 1924	
	William P. Nagle Jr.	June 10, 1951	
	Robert L. Nardone	September 13, 1953	
	Andrew Natsios	September 22, 1949	
	Joseph M. Navin	May 19, 1946	
	Lou Nickinello	September 8, 1940	
	Elaine Noble	January 22, 1944	
	James R. Nolen	April 17, 1933	
	Nils L. Nordberg	November 6, 1934	
	Thomas C. Norton	December 11, 1934	
	O. Roland Orlandi	March 25, 1936	
	Nicholas Paleologos	March 9, 1953	
	Raymond S. Peck	December 10, 1922	
	Felix Perrault	October 27, 1915	
	John B. Perry	February 15, 1935	
	Robert G. Phelan	March 19, 1933	
	William A. Pickett	June 10, 1935	
	Angelo Picucci	April 12, 1915	
	Ronald Anthony Pina	August 11, 1944	
	Lois Pines	August 16, 1940	
	Vincent J. Piro	1931	
	Kevin Poirier	July 7, 1940	
	Daniel F. Pokaski	June 26, 1949	
	Manuel Raposa Jr.	May 13, 1915	
	Michael J. Rea Jr.	July 23, 1940	
	William G. Robinson	March 10, 1926	
	Richard P. Roche	February 15, 1952	
	A. David Rodham	November 26, 1938	
	Andrew J. Rogers Jr.	May 6, 1944	
	Francis E. Rogers	July 18, 1932	
	Richard A. Rogers	July 8, 1930	
	Robert J. Rohan	August 15, 1921	
	J. Michael Ruane	December 10, 1927	
	John Rucho	November 22, 1922	
	Alfred E. Saggese Jr.	November 21, 1946	
	Sherman Saltmarsh	April 27, 1929	
	Angelo Scaccia	September 29, 1942	
	Joseph Scelsi	June 4, 1915	
	Anthony M. Scibelli	October 16, 1911	
	James W. Segel	June 29, 1945	
	Joseph J. Semensi	March 6, 1923	
	Emanuel Serra	June 12, 1945	
	William G. Shaughnessy	July 10, 1918	
	C. Vincent Shea	November 20, 1916	
	Philip L. Shea	October 19, 1941	
	James A. Sheets	June 3, 1935	
	Edward Shortell	August 21, 1916	
	Richard R. Silva	March 13, 1922	
	Thomas G. Simons	January 21, 1942	
	James E. Smith	September 3, 1946	
	George R. Sprague	June 19, 1938	
	William F. Stanley	June 25, 1937	
	Caroline Stouffer	April 5, 1933	
	Gregory W. Sullivan	January 29, 1952	
	Karen Swanson	January 15, 1954	
	David J. Swartz	April 2, 1931	
	Royall H. Switzler	September 27, 1938	
	Robert S. Teahan	March 1, 1921	
	Theodore J. Trudeau	January 22, 1916	
	Peter A. Velis	October 8, 1942	
	Robert A. Vigneau	November 4, 1920	
	Carlton M. Viveiros	December 4, 1938	
	Richard Voke	December 2, 1947	
	Max Volterra	January 7, 1936	
	Henry A. Walker	December 7, 1919	
	Richard L. Walsh	July 26, 1948	
	Norman S. Weinberg	1919	
	Bruce E. Wetherbee	September 1, 1950	
	W. Paul White	July 7, 1945	
	Thomas P. White	August 27, 1950	
	A. James Whitney	April 15, 1943	
	Francis H. Woodward	March 17, 1939	

== See also ==
- 95th United States Congress
- List of Massachusetts General Courts
