= 1969–1970 Massachusetts legislature =

166th Massachusetts General Court
←	165th	167th	→

Overview
- Legislative body: General Court
- Election: November 5, 1968

Senate
- Members: 40
- President: Maurice A. Donahue (2nd Hampden district)
- Majority Leader: Kevin B. Harrington
- Majority Whip: Mario Umana
- Minority Leader: John Francis Parker
- Minority Whip: William D. Weeks
- Party control: Democrat

House
- Members: 240
- Speaker: David M. Bartley
- Majority Leader: Thomas W. McGee
- Majority Whip: Paul F. Murphy
- Minority Leader: Sidney Curtiss
- Minority Whip: George W. Shattuck
- Party control: Democrat

Sessions
- 1st: January 1, 1969 – August 25, 1969
- 2nd: January 7, 1970 – August 25, 1970

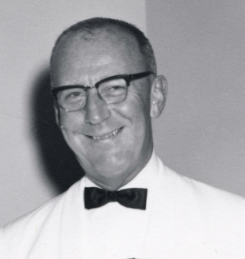
Maurice Donahue, Senate president.

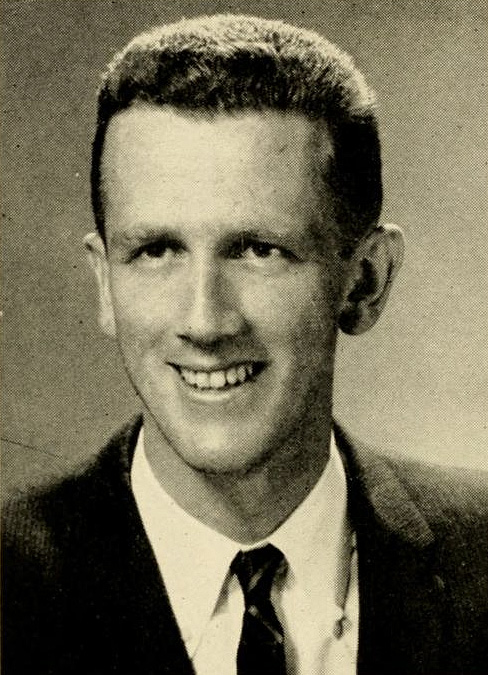
David Bartley, House speaker.

Leaders of the Massachusetts General Court, 1969.

The 166th Massachusetts General Court, consisting of the Massachusetts Senate and the Massachusetts House of Representatives, met in 1969 and 1970 during the governorship of Francis Sargent. Maurice A. Donahue served as president of the Senate and David M. Bartley served as speaker of the House.

== Senators ==
portrait	name	date of birth	district
	Oliver F. Ames	December 13, 1920	3rd Suffolk
	John Dowkontt Barrus	August 19, 1924	
	James F. Burke	September 7, 1914	
	Robert L. Cawley	July 30, 1934	
	Beryl Cohen	September 18, 1934	
	John J. Conte	May 3, 1930	
	James DeNormandie	November 10, 1907	
	Joseph DiCarlo	March 21, 1936	
	Maurice A. Donahue	September 12, 1918	
	Daniel J. Foley	April 6, 1921	
	Mary L. Fonseca	March 30, 1915	
	George D. Hammond	October 29, 1906	
	Samuel Harmon	April 29, 1911	
	Kevin B. Harrington	January 9, 1929	
	John Edward Harrington Jr.	July 30, 1930	
	Charles V. Hogan	April 12, 1897	
	Allan Francis Jones	June 29, 1921	
	James A. Kelly Jr.	May 11, 1926	
	George V. Kenneally Jr.	December 29, 1929	
	Fred I. Lamson	December 11, 1910	
	David H. Locke	August 4, 1927	
	Ronald Conrad MacKenzie	May 3, 1934	
	Francis X. McCann	September 2, 1912	
	James McIntyre (politician)	May 25, 1930	
	Denis L. Mckenna	August 14, 1922	
	George G. Mendonca	March 26, 1924	
	Joe Moakley	April 27, 1927	
	Andrea F. Nuciforo Sr.	July 14, 1927	
	John Francis Parker	May 29, 1907	
	Philibert L. Pellegrini	September 4, 1918	
	John M. Quinlan	July 11, 1935	
	Philip Andrew Quinn	February 21, 1910	
	William I. Randall	September 13, 1915	
	James Paul Rurak	November 9, 1911	
	William L. Saltonstall	May 14, 1927	
	Mario Umana	May 5, 1914	
	William X. Wall	July 1, 1904	
	Joseph D. Ward	March 26, 1914	
	William D. Weeks	May 9, 1926	
	Stanley John Zarod	April 11, 1924	

== Representatives ==
portrait	name	date of birth	district
	James A. Adams	December 24, 1923	
	Antone S. Aguiar Jr.	January 2, 1930	10th Bristol
	David C. Ahearn	July 28, 1929	
	Theodore J. Aleixo Jr.	August 23, 1942	
	Robert B. Ambler	1927	
	John A. Armstrong	June 12, 1901	
	Robert S. Aronson	July 3, 1920	
	Peter George Asiaf	August 15, 1905	
	Roger Sumner Babb	1935	
	Jack Backman	April 26, 1922	
	Wilfred E. Balthazar	July 17, 1914	
	David M. Bartley	February 9, 1935	
	Robert A. Belmonte	July 2, 1930	
	Roger L. Bernashe	September 9, 1927	
	Louis Peter Bertonazzi	October 9, 1933	
	Francis Bevilacqua	August 12, 1923	
	Donald T. Bliss	1937	
	Belden Bly	September 29, 1914	
	Stanley Joseph Bocko	August 26, 1920	
	Robert Joseph Bohigian	July 24, 1922	
	George Bourque	1913	
	John Jerome Bowes	February 25, 1917	
	James John Bowler	July 18, 1923	
	John Cornelius Bresnahan	November 14, 1919	
	Joseph E. Brett	May 19, 1907	
	John R. Buckley	1932	
	Robert C. Buell	April 23, 1931	
	Nicholas J. Buglione	1932	
	William Bulger	February 2, 1934	
	Walter T. Burke	August 5, 1911	
	Thomas Bussone	September 20, 1912	
	Louis Buttiglieri	May 18, 1916	
	Fred F. Cain	November 5, 1909	
	Eleanor Campobasso	August 10, 1923	
	William A. Carey	January 28, 1920	
	Philip N. Carney	June 6, 1919	
	Daniel William Carney	August 17, 1925	
	Emmett J. Cauley	February 28, 1903	
	Paul J. Cavanaugh	February 22, 1936	
	Harrison Chadwick	February 25, 1903	
	Rudy Chmura	March 21, 1932	
	Steve T. Chmura	March 29, 1928	
	John F. Coffey	February 7, 1918	
	Lincoln P. Cole Jr.	September 18, 1918	
	Andrew Collaro	March 21, 1910	
	H. Thomas Colo	December 27, 1929	
	William Augustine Connell Jr.	November 17, 1922	
	James S. Conway	July 4, 1930	
	Francis X. Coppinger	March 12, 1935	
	Paul J. Corriveau	July 3, 1930	
	Edward P. Coury	October 19, 1927	
	Gilbert W. Cox Jr.	February 28, 1933	
	James J. Craven Jr.	March 24, 1919	
	Robert Creedon	November 13, 1942	
	Thomas E. Creighton	February 1, 1922	
	Paul W. Cronin	March 14, 1938	
	Sidney Curtiss	September 4, 1917	
	Michael John Daly	July 18, 1940	
	Richard W. Daly	March 25, 1936	
	Alan Paul Danovitch	September 17, 1940	
	Joseph Del Grosso	July 25, 1904	
	John Joseph Desmond	July 1, 1930	
	Arthur Leo Desrocher	January 25, 1930	
	Edward J. Dever Jr.	June 21, 1936	
	Edward M. Dickson	March 12, 1912	
	Anthony R. DiFruscia	June 5, 1940	
	George DiLorenzo	March 24, 1919	
	John F. Dolan	September 7, 1922	
	Charles Robert Doyle	September 24, 1925	
	Wilfred C. Driscoll	December 31, 1926	
	Michael Dukakis	November 3, 1933	
	Richard J. Dwinell	August 5, 1917	
	Joseph D. Early	January 31, 1933	
	Charles F. Engdahl	July 3, 1921	
	Seymour F. Epstein	November 7, 1919	
	Thomas Francis Fallon	December 4, 1929	
	Vernon R. Farnsworth Jr.	April 18, 1934	
	Thomas F. Farrell	October 10, 1897	
	Michael Paul Feeney	March 26, 1907	
	John J. Finnegan	July 21, 1938	
	Irving Fishman	March 29, 1921	
	Charles Flaherty	October 13, 1938	
	Michael F. Flaherty Sr.	September 6, 1936	
	Edward M. Flanagan	January 9, 1929	
	Charles L. Flannery	March 22, 1920	
	David Lawrence Flynn	February 5, 1933	
	Bruce N. Freeman	March 4, 1921	
	Maurice E. Frye Jr.	February 6, 1921	
	Edward F. Galotti	May 11, 1925	
	Ann Gannett	November 7, 1916	
	Donald R. Gaudette	December 16, 1926	
	T. Harold Gayron	August 31, 1914	
	J. Laurence Golden	June 10, 1933	
	Joel S. Greenberg	May 31, 1930	
	James L. Grimaldi	May 3, 1911	
	Anthony P. Grosso	October 19, 1913	
	Gerard A. Guilmette	October 22, 1911	
	Barry T. Hannon	November 21, 1935	
	Walter J. Hannon	September 4, 1931	
	Michael J. Harrington	September 2, 1936	
	Edward D. Harrington Jr.	August 11, 1921	
	J. Edmond Harris	November 17, 1916	
	David E. Harrison	June 19, 1933	
	Francis W. Hatch Jr.	May 6, 1925	
	Michael E. Haynes	May 9, 1927	
	Winston Healy	October 20, 1937	
	Theodore M. Herman	October 5, 1919	
	Timothy William Hickey	February 14, 1938	
	William Francis Hogan	June 6, 1925	
	Franklin W. Holgate	May 3, 1929	
	Herbert B. Hollis	September 10, 1899	
	Marie Elizabeth Howe	June 13, 1939	
	John Peter Ivascyn	October 19, 1909	
	John Janas	September 4, 1910	
	Daniel L. Joyce Jr.	May 14, 1934	
	Francis M. Keane	April 8, 1933	
	Joseph M. Kearney	February 23, 1927	
	F. Leo Kenney	November 15, 1902	
	Walter T. Kerr	May 20, 1918	
	George Keverian	June 3, 1931	
	Gregory Benjamin Khachadoorian	July 8, 1928	
	Cornelius F. Kiernan	August 15, 1917	
	William I. Kitterman	July 19, 1928	
	Walter Kostanski	December 10, 1923	
	Mitsie T. Kulig	May 18, 1921	
	Matthew J. Kuss	December 5, 1915	
	Raymond M. LaFontaine	May 18, 1927	
	Richard E. Landry	May 29, 1936	
	Joseph A. Langone, III	January 25, 1917	
	Francis C. Lapointe	January 13, 1939	
	J. Louis Leblanc	January 6, 1940	
	Arthur Joseph Lewis Jr.	September 3, 1934	
	David Samuel Liederman	April 26, 1935	
	Martin A. Linsky	August 28, 1940	
	Alexander Lolas	July 9, 1932	
	Gerald P. Lombard	January 4, 1916	
	Michael J. Lombardi	May 27, 1917	
	Charles W. Long	August 14, 1940	
	John J. Long	December 10, 1927	
	John C. Losch	March 23, 1932	
	Charles A. MacKenzie Jr.	February 4, 1919	
	William Q. MacLean Jr.	November 4, 1934	
	Paul F. Malloy	April 29, 1940	
	Theodore D. Mann	May 13, 1922	
	Charles Mann	April 27, 1935	
	M. Joseph Manning	September 23, 1924	
	Donald J. Manning	June 23, 1929	
	Clifford Marshall	December 14, 1937	
	Frank J. Matrango	July 19, 1926	
	Benjamin C. Mayhew Jr.	October 28, 1909	
	Anthony P. McBride	August 28, 1932	
	Peter C. McCarthy	September 8, 1941	
	Edward A. McColgan	March 20, 1932	
	Thomas W. McGee	May 24, 1924	
	Robert J. McGinn	December 18, 1918	
	John Austin Shaw McGlennon	August 10, 1935	
	John J. McGlynn	February 26, 1922	
	Charles M. McGowan	November 13, 1923	
	Allan McGuane	July 26, 1928	
	Arthur James McKenna	October 29, 1914	
	John F. Melia	June 5, 1915	
	Paul C. Menton	April 15, 1925	
	John J. Mooney	August 14, 1930	
	Hugh J. Morgan Jr.	April 4, 1921	
	Louis J. Morini	October 8, 1907	
	Paul F. Murphy	October 14, 1932	
	Paul Maurice Murphy	February 24, 1932	
	Albert L. Nash	May 13, 1921	
	John J. Navin	September 9, 1915	
	Mary B. Newman	February 15, 1909	2nd Middlesex
	James R. Nolen	April 17, 1933	
	Nils L. Nordberg	November 6, 1934	
	Karl S. Nordin	September 10, 1906	
	James Anthony O'Brien Jr.	June 22, 1919	
	John Paul O'Brien	June 10, 1937	
	Norton Cornelius O'Brien	April 9, 1907	
	Walter Wilson O'Brien	October 14, 1910	
	David J. O'Connor	November 9, 1924	
	Philip Conroy O'Donnell	July 29, 1915	
	Charles Ohanian	September 2, 1936	
	Carl R. Ohlson	June 4, 1925	
	John Olver	September 3, 1936	
	Bernard Paquette	February 2, 1919	
	Raymond S. Peck	December 10, 1922	
	Felix Perrault	October 27, 1915	
	William A. Pickett	June 10, 1935	
	Angelo Picucci	April 12, 1915	
	Vincent J. Piro	1931	
	Manuel Raposa Jr.	May 13, 1915	
	Harry A. S. Read	November 18, 1936	
	William Reinstein	March 26, 1929	
	Robert C. Reynolds	November 6, 1934	
	William G. Robinson	March 10, 1926	
	J. Hilary Rockett	January 16, 1935	
	George Rogers (Massachusetts politician)	August 2, 1933	
	Maurice E. Ronayne Jr.	November 16, 1917	
	Nathan Rosenfeld	January 31, 1906	
	Raymond F. Rourke	October 10, 1917	
	William H. Ryan	July 17, 1938	
	George Sacco	July 19, 1936	
	Joseph Douglas Saulnier	April 14, 1906	
	Anthony James Scalli	November 11, 1914	
	Frederic W. Schlosstein Jr.	March 17, 1923	
	Anthony M. Scibelli	October 16, 1911	
	Jerome A. Segal	June 3, 1931	
	Joseph J. Semensi	March 6, 1923	
	I. Edward Serlin	August 21, 1912	
	George W. Shattuck	July 17, 1916	
	H. James Shea Jr.	December 10, 1939	
	C. Vincent Shea	November 20, 1916	
	Paul J. Sheehy	November 1, 1934	
	Andre Rives Sigourney	June 30, 1927	
	Michael John Simonelli	May 9, 1913	
	Ralph E. Sirianni Jr.	1923	
	Alan Sisitsky	June 4, 1942	
	John J. Slater Jr.	November 27, 1925	
	Lawrence Philip Smith	December 4, 1919	
	George I. Spatcher	February 2, 1902	
	William J. Spence	May 4, 1930	
	John F. St. Cyr	January 8, 1936	
	Kevin C. Sullivan		
	Charles Tagman		
	A. Edward Talbot	January 24, 1915	
	Arthur Tobin	May 22, 1930	
	John Joseph Toomey	March 25, 1909	
	Daniel C. Towse	December 5, 1924	
	George E. Twomey	February 3, 1920	
	Robert A. Vigneau	November 4, 1920	
	Dave Norman Vigneault	September 3, 1936	
	Joseph B. Walsh	November 15, 1923	
	Stephen Weekes	February 1, 1925	
	Norman S. Weinberg	1919	
	Robert D. Wetmore	July 24, 1930	
	Thomas Casmere Wojtkowski	September 18, 1926	
	Richard L. Wood		
	George L. Woods Jr.	March 28, 1925	
	George Chester Young	September 18, 1912	
	Bruce H. Zeiser		
	Samuel Zoll	June 20, 1934	

== See also ==
- 1970 Massachusetts gubernatorial election
- 91st United States Congress
- List of Massachusetts General Courts
