= 1971–1972 Massachusetts legislature =

167th Massachusetts General Court
←	166th	168th	→

Overview
- Legislative body: General Court
- Term: January 6, 1971 – July 9, 1972

Senate
- Members: 40
- President: Kevin B. Harrington
- Majority Leader: Mario Umana
- Majority Whip: James McIntyre (1971); Joseph DiCarlo (1972)
- Minority Leader: John Francis Parker
- Minority Whip: David H. Locke
- Party control: Democrat

House
- Members: 240
- Speaker: David M. Bartley
- Majority Leader: Thomas W. McGee
- Majority Whip: Paul F. Murphy
- Minority Leader: Francis W. Hatch Jr.
- Minority Whip: Robert A. Belmonte
- Party control: Democrat

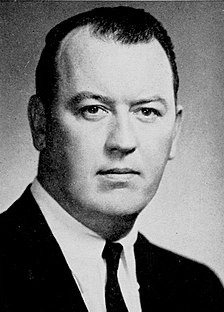
Kevin Harrington, Senate president.

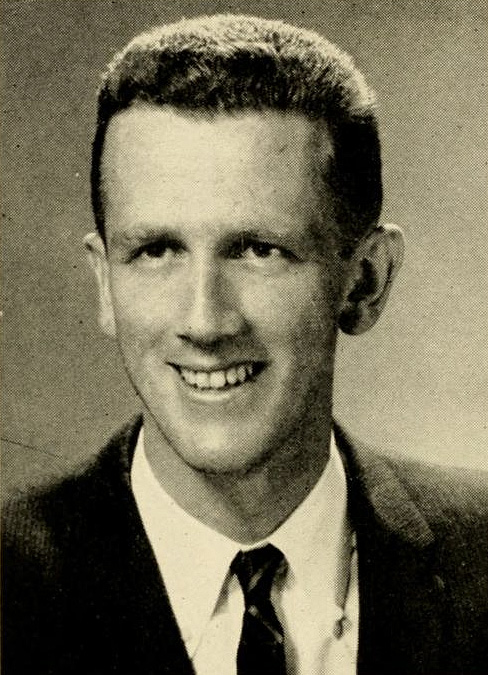
David Bartley, House speaker.

Leaders of the Massachusetts General Court, 1971-1972.

The 167th Massachusetts General Court, consisting of the Massachusetts Senate and the Massachusetts House of Representatives, met in 1971 and 1972 during the governorship of Francis Sargent. Kevin B. Harrington served as president of the Senate and David M. Bartley served as speaker of the House.

== Senators ==
portrait	name	date of birth	district
	John F. Aylmer	January 27, 1934	
	Jack Backman	April 26, 1922	
	John Dowkontt Barrus	August 19, 1924	
	Roger L. Bernashe	September 9, 1927	2nd Hampden
	William Bulger	February 2, 1934	
	James F. Burke	September 7, 1914	
	Edward L. Burke	1942	
	Robert L. Cawley	July 30, 1934	
	John J. Conte	May 3, 1930	
	James DeNormandie	November 10, 1907	
	Joseph DiCarlo	March 21, 1936	
	Irving Fishman	March 29, 1921	
	Daniel J. Foley	April 6, 1921	
	Mary L. Fonseca	March 30, 1915	
	George D. Hammond	October 29, 1906	
	Samuel Harmon	April 29, 1911	
	Kevin B. Harrington	January 9, 1929	
	Charles V. Hogan	April 12, 1897	
	James A. Kelly Jr.	May 11, 1926	
	George V. Kenneally Jr.	December 29, 1929	
	Fred I. Lamson	December 11, 1910	
	David H. Locke	August 4, 1927	
	Ronald MacKenzie	May 3, 1934	
	Francis X. McCann	September 2, 1912	
	James McIntyre (politician)	May 25, 1930	
	Denis L. Mckenna	August 14, 1922	
	Allan R. McKinnon	June 2, 1930	
	George G. Mendonca	March 26, 1924	
	Andrea F. Nuciforo Sr.	July 14, 1927	
	John Francis Parker	May 29, 1907	
	Philibert L. Pellegrini	September 4, 1918	
	John M. Quinlan	July 11, 1935	
	Philip Andrew Quinn	February 21, 1910	
	James Paul Rurak	November 9, 1911	
	William L. Saltonstall	May 14, 1927	
	Arthur Tobin	May 22, 1930	
	B. Joseph Tully	January 4, 1927	
	Mario Umana	May 5, 1914	
	William X. Wall	July 1, 1904	
	Joseph D. Ward	March 26, 1914	
	Stanley John Zarod	April 11, 1924	

== Representatives ==
portrait	name	date of birth	district
	James A. Adams	December 24, 1923	15th Hampden
	Antone S. Aguiar Jr.	January 2, 1930	
	Theodore J. Aleixo Jr.	August 23, 1942	
	Alfred Almeida	October 5, 1931	
	Robert B. Ambler	1927	
	John S. Ames, III	October 18, 1936	
	Robert S. Aronson	July 3, 1920	
	William G. Arvanitis	September 16, 1946	
	Peter George Asiaf	August 15, 1905	
	Chester G. Atkins	April 14, 1948	
	Roger Sumner Babb	1935	
	Wilfred E. Balthazar	July 17, 1914	
	David M. Bartley	February 9, 1935	
	Robert A. Belmonte	July 2, 1930	
	Louis Peter Bertonazzi	October 9, 1933	
	Francis Bevilacqua	August 12, 1923	
	Donald T. Bliss	1937	
	Belden Bly	September 29, 1914	
	Robert Joseph Bohigian	July 24, 1922	
	Royal L. Bolling Sr.	June 19, 1920	
	George Bourque	1913	
	Walter J. Boverini	June 5, 1925	
	John Jerome Bowes	February 25, 1917	
	Joseph E. Brett	May 19, 1907	
	John R. Buckley	1932	
	Robert C. Buell	April 23, 1931	
	Charles J. Buffone	1919	
	Nicholas J. Buglione	1932	
	Walter T. Burke	August 5, 1911	
	John A. Businger		
	Thomas Bussone	September 20, 1912	
	Robert E. Cahill	November 25, 1934	
	Howard C. Cahoon, Jr	December 31, 1944	
	Fred F. Cain	November 5, 1909	
	William R. Callahan (state representative)	April 27, 1925	
	Eleanor Campobasso	August 10, 1923	
	William A. Carey	September 2, 1899	
	Paul J. Cavanaugh	February 22, 1936	
	Harrison Chadwick	February 25, 1903	
	Rudy Chmura	March 21, 1932	
	Steve T. Chmura	March 29, 1928	
	John F. Coffey	February 7, 1918	
	Lincoln P. Cole, Jr.	September 18, 1918	
	H. Thomas Colo	December 27, 1929	
	Edward W. Connelly	August 2, 1919	
	Paul J. Corriveau	July 3, 1930	
	Edward P. Coury	October 19, 1927	
	Gilbert W. Cox, Jr	February 28, 1933	
	James J. Craven, Jr.	March 24, 1919	
	Robert Creedon	November 13, 1942	
	Thomas E. Creighton	February 1, 1922	
	Sidney Curtiss	September 4, 1917	
	John F. Cusack	October 5, 1937	
	Alan Paul Danovitch	September 17, 1940	
	Joseph Del Grosso	July 25, 1904	
	Arthur Leo Desrocher	January 25, 1930	
	Edward J. Dever, Jr	June 21, 1936	
	Edward M. Dickson	March 12, 1912	
	Anthony R. DiFruscia	June 5, 1940	
	William J. Dignan	September 28, 1926	
	Robert F. Donovan	September 13, 1936	
	Charles Robert Doyle	September 24, 1925	
	Wilfred C. Driscoll	December 31, 1926	
	Dennis J. Duffin	November 24, 1930	
	Richard J. Dwinell	August 5, 1917	
	Joseph D. Early	January 31, 1933	
	Albert E. Elwell	October 29, 1899	
	Thomas Francis Fallon	December 4, 1929	
	Vernon R. Farnsworth, Jr	April 18, 1934	
	Thomas F. Farrell	October 10, 1897	
	Michael Paul Feeney	March 26, 1907	
	Charles Flaherty	October 13, 1938	
	Michael F. Flaherty Sr.	September 6, 1936	
	Charles L. Flannery	March 22, 1920	
	David Lawrence Flynn	February 5, 1933	
	Raymond Flynn		
	Bruce N. Freeman	March 4, 1921	
	Maurice E. Frye, Jr	February 6, 1921	
	Edward F. Galotti	May 11, 1925	
	Ann Gannett	November 7, 1916	
	Donald R. Gaudette	December 16, 1926	
	Robert W. Gillette	September 1, 1934	
	James L. Grimaldi	May 3, 1911	
	Anthony P. Grosso	October 19, 1913	
	Gerard A. Guilmette	October 22, 1911	
	Paul Guzzi	June 17, 1942	
	Edward D. Harrington Jr.	August 11, 1921	
	James F. Hart	January 15, 1932	
	Francis W. Hatch Jr.	May 6, 1925	
	Jonathan Healy	October 10, 1945	
	Marie Elizabeth Howe	June 13, 1939	
	James P. Hurrell	March 1, 1944	
	John Peter Ivascyn	October 19, 1909	
	Daniel L. Joyce, Jr	May 14, 1934	
	Richard Kendall	August 21, 1934	
	George Keverian	June 3, 1931	
	John G. King (politician)	November 30, 1942	
	William I. Kitterman	July 19, 1928	
	Mitsie T. Kulig	May 18, 1921	
	Raymond M. LaFontaine	May 18, 1927	
	Nickolas Lambros	January 9, 1933	
	Richard E. Landry	May 29, 1936	
	Joseph A. Langone, III	January 25, 1917	
	Francis C. Lapointe	January 13, 1939	
	Michael E. McLaughlin	October 27, 1945	
	David Samuel Liederman	April 26, 1935	
	Martin A. Linsky	August 28, 1940	
	David J. Lionett	October 3, 1943	
	Alexander Lolas	July 9, 1932	
	Gerald P. Lombard	January 4, 1916	
	Charles W. Long	August 14, 1940	
	John J. Long	December 10, 1927	
	John C. Losch	March 23, 1932	
	Charles A. MacKenzie, Jr	February 4, 1919	
	William Q. MacLean Jr.	November 4, 1934	
	Thomas H. D. Mahoney	November 4, 1913	
	Theodore D. Mann	May 13, 1922	
	M. Joseph Manning	September 23, 1924	
	Donald J. Manning	June 23, 1929	
	Clifford Marshall	December 14, 1937	
	Peter L. Masnik	March 13, 1942	
	Frank J. Matrango	July 19, 1926	
	Gregory Mayhew		
	Anthony P. McBride	August 28, 1932	
	Robert E. McCarthy	January 12, 1940	
	Peter C. McCarthy	September 8, 1941	
	Edward A. McColgan	March 20, 1932	
	Thomas W. McGee	May 24, 1924	
	Robert J. McGinn	December 18, 1918	
	Charles M. McGowan	November 13, 1923	
	Allan McGuane	July 26, 1928	
	Arthur James McKenna	October 29, 1914	
	Paul C. Menton	April 15, 1925	
	James B. Moseley		
	Paul F. Murphy	October 14, 1932	
	Paul Maurice Murphy	February 24, 1932	
	John J. Navin	September 9, 1915	
	James R. Nolen	April 17, 1933	
	James Anthony O'Brien, Jr	June 22, 1919	
	John Paul O'Brien	June 10, 1937	
	Norton Cornelius O'Brien	April 9, 1907	
	James E. O'Leary	April 7, 1933	
	Carl R. Ohlson	June 4, 1925	
	Raymond S. Peck	December 10, 1922	
	Felix Perrault	October 27, 1915	
	Angelo Picucci	April 12, 1915	
	Bradford Pottle		
	Manuel Raposa, Jr.	May 13, 1915	
	Robert C. Reynolds	November 6, 1934	
	William G. Robinson	March 10, 1926	
	J. Hilary Rockett	January 16, 1935	
	Maurice E. Ronayne, Jr	November 16, 1917	
	Raymond F. Rourke	October 10, 1917	
	William H. Ryan	July 17, 1938	
	Anthony James Scalli	November 11, 1914	
	Frederic W. Schlosstein, Jr	March 17, 1923	
	I. Edward Serlin	August 21, 1912	
	Emanuel Serra	June 12, 1945	
	George W. Shattuck	July 17, 1916	
	C. Vincent Shea	November 20, 1916	
	Paul J. Sheehy	November 1, 1934	
	Richard R. Silva	March 13, 1922	
	Thomas G. Simons	January 21, 1942	
	Ralph E. Sirianni Jr.	1923	
	Alan Sisitsky	June 4, 1942	
	William J. Spence	May 4, 1930	
	Kevin C. Sullivan		
	Daniel C. Towse	December 5, 1924	
	George E. Twomey	February 3, 1920	
	Robert A. Vigneau	November 4, 1920	
	Carlton M. Viveiros	December 4, 1938	
	Norman S. Weinberg	1919	
	Robert D. Wetmore	July 24, 1930	
	Thomas Casmere Wojtkowski	September 18, 1926	
	George L. Woods, Jr	March 28, 1925	
	George Chester Young	September 18, 1912	

== See also ==
- 92nd United States Congress
- List of Massachusetts General Courts
