= 1981–1982 Massachusetts legislature =

172nd Massachusetts General Court
←	171st	173rd	→

Overview
- Legislative body: General Court
- Term: January 7, 1981 – January 2, 1983

Senate
- Members: 40
- President: William Bulger
- Majority Leader: Daniel J. Foley
- Majority Whip: Mary L. Fonseca
- Minority Leader: John Francis Parker
- Minority Whip: David H. Locke
- Party control: Democrat

House
- Members: 160
- Speaker: Thomas W. McGee
- Majority Leader: George Keverian
- Majority Whip: John E. Murphy Jr.
- Minority Leader: William G. Robinson
- Minority Whip: Iris Holland
- Party control: Democrat

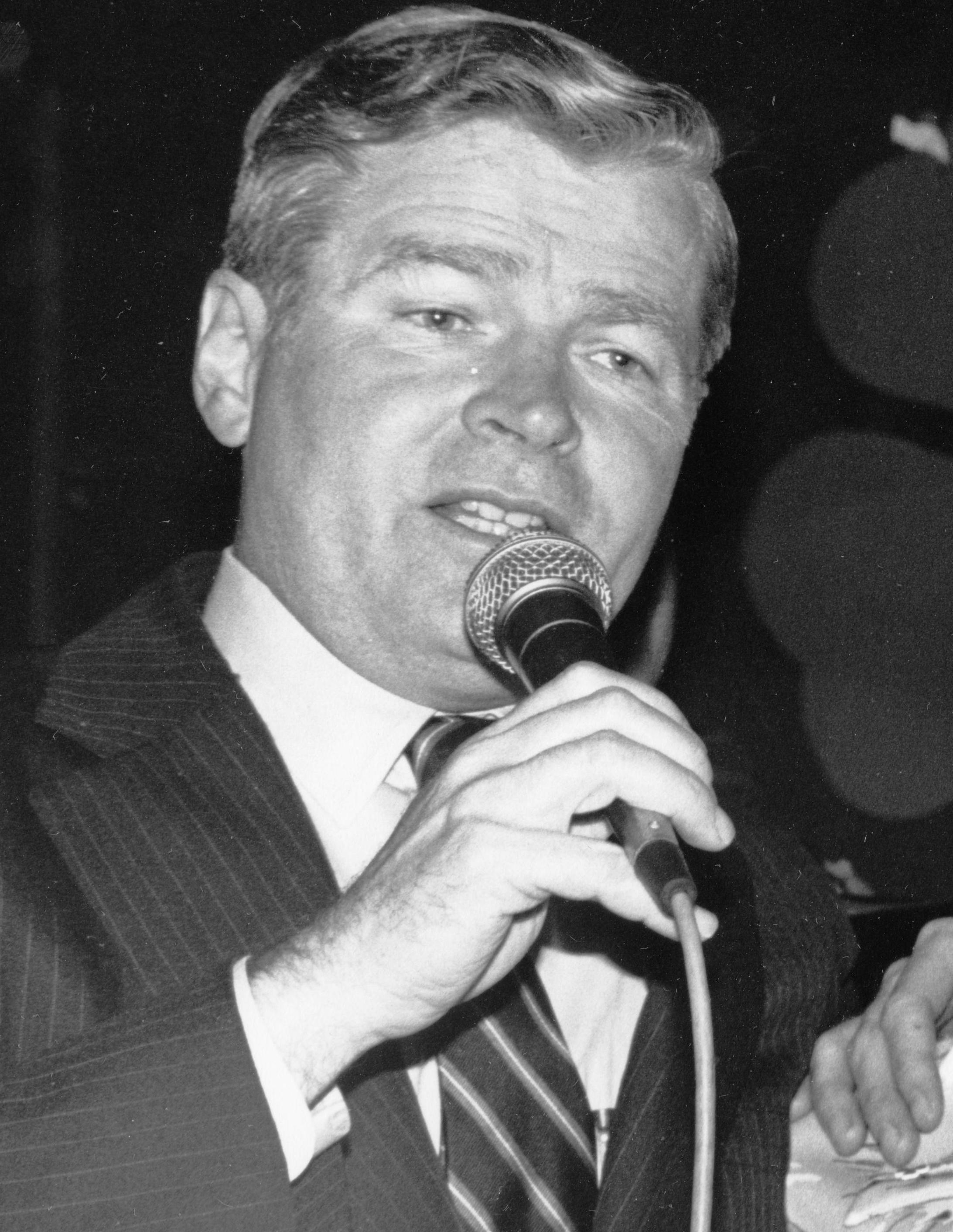
William Bulger, Senate president.

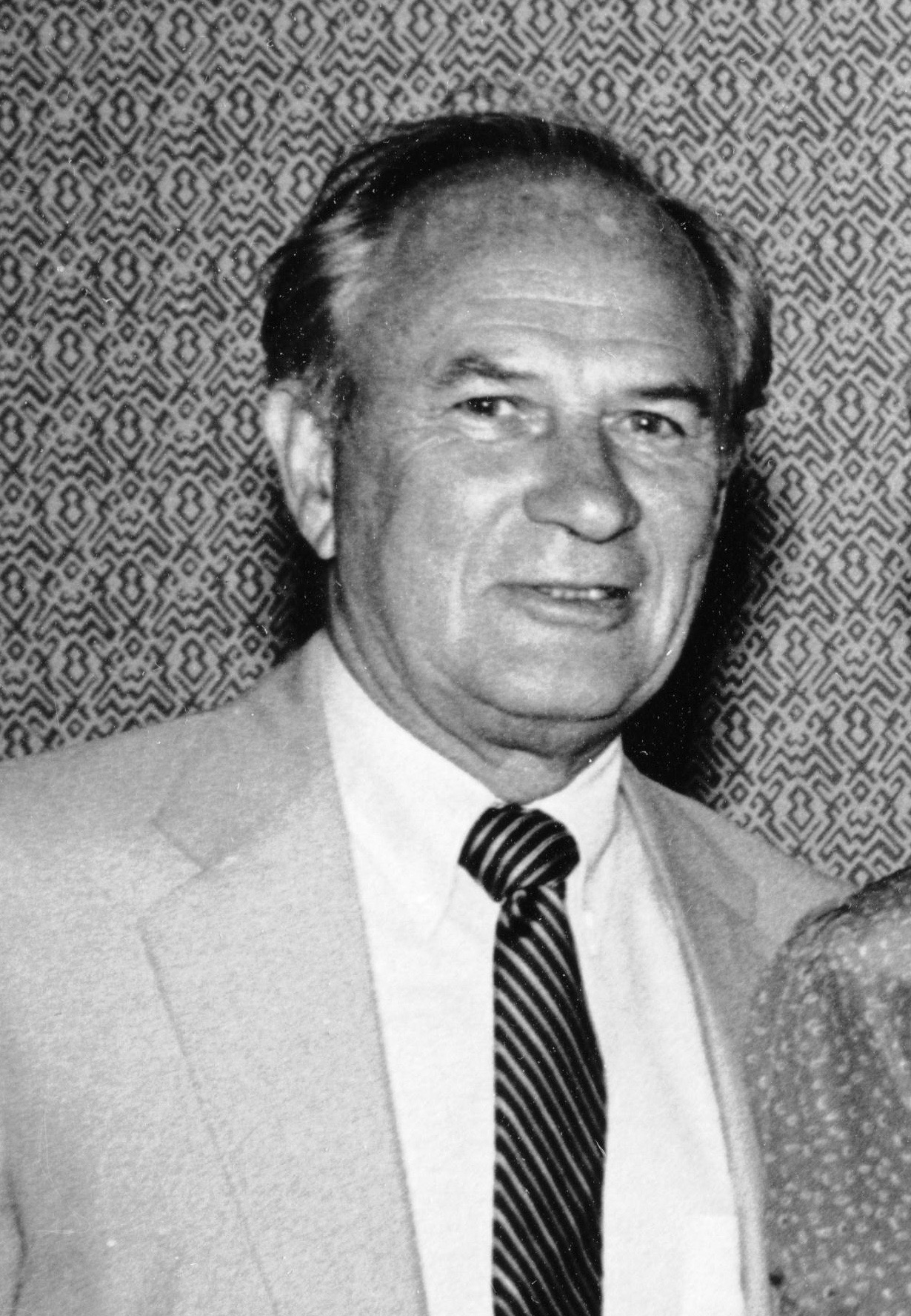
Thomas McGee, House speaker.

Leaders of the Massachusetts General Court, 1981-1982.

The 172nd Massachusetts General Court, consisting of the Massachusetts Senate and the Massachusetts House of Representatives, met in 1981 and 1982 during the governorship of Edward J. King. William Bulger served as president of the Senate and Thomas W. McGee served as speaker of the House.

"In 1981, the General Court overrode the veto of Gov. Edward King to make Massachusetts one of the first states to encourage recycling" by bottle deposit.

== Senators ==
portrait	name	date of birth	district
	Carol C. Amick		5th Middlesex
	Chester G. Atkins	April 14, 1948	
	John F. Aylmer	January 27, 1934	
	George Bachrach	December 2, 1951	
	Jack Backman	April 26, 1922	
	Louis Peter Bertonazzi	October 9, 1933	
	Walter J. Boverini	June 5, 1925	
	John A. Brennan Jr.	September 19, 1945	
	Anna Buckley	1924	
	Robert C. Buell	April 23, 1931	
	William Bulger	February 2, 1934	
	John P. Burke	December 2, 1954	
	Edward L. Burke	1942	
	Gerard D'Amico	July 27, 1947	
	Paul Doane	March 26, 1943	
	Francis D. Doris	1931	
	Daniel J. Foley	April 6, 1921	
	Mary L. Fonseca	March 30, 1915	
	Robert A. Hall	April 15, 1946	
	Paul D. Harold	September 5, 1948	
	John G. King (politician)	November 30, 1942	
	Edward P. Kirby	January 10, 1928	
	Arthur Joseph Lewis Jr.	September 3, 1934	
	David H. Locke	August 4, 1927	
	Michael LoPresti Jr.	April 30, 1947	
	William Q. MacLean Jr.	November 4, 1934	
	Patricia McGovern	August 2, 1941	
	Denis L. Mckenna	August 14, 1922	
	Allan R. McKinnon	June 2, 1930	
	John Olver	September 3, 1936	
	Bill Owens (Massachusetts politician)	July 6, 1937	
	John Francis Parker	May 29, 1907	
	Sharon Pollard	September 21, 1950	
	Martin Thomas Reilly	September 1, 1956	
	Samuel Rotondi	April 22, 1946	
	Philip L. Shea	October 19, 1941	
	Alan Sisitsky	June 4, 1942	
	Joseph F. Timilty (state senator)	October 3, 1938	
	Roger Tougas	January 9, 1927	
	Joseph B. Walsh	November 15, 1923	
	Peter Colbourne Webber	May 12, 1952	
	Robert D. Wetmore	July 24, 1930	

== Representatives ==
portrait	name	date of birth	district
	Antone S. Aguiar Jr.	January 2, 1930	4th Bristol
	Theodore J. Aleixo Jr.	August 23, 1942	
	Lawrence R. Alexander	1950	
	Steven Angelo	June 8, 1952	
	Peter George Asiaf	August 15, 1905	
	Michael J. Barrett	June 27, 1948	
	Timothy A. Bassett	December 16, 1947	
	William D. Benson	1948	
	Walter Bickford	February 16, 1942	
	Kevin Blanchette	1954	
	Robert Joseph Bohigian	July 24, 1922	
	Royal L. Bolling Jr.	May 1, 1944	
	George Bourque	1913	
	James T. Brett	December 22, 1949	
	Nicholas J. Buglione	1932	
	Doris Bunte	July 2, 1933	
	John Businger	February 5, 1945	
	Jeremiah F. Cahir	December 4, 1924	
	Howard C. Cahoon Jr.	December 31, 1944	
	Ellen M. Canavan	December 26, 1941	
	Andrew Card	May 10, 1947	
	William A. Carey	January 28, 1920	
	Angelo R. Cataldo	November 12, 1917	
	Paul Cellucci	April 24, 1948	
	Allan R. Chiocca	May 3, 1954	
	Rudy Chmura	March 21, 1932	
	Salvatore Ciccarelli	February 16, 1941	
	Forrester Clark	November 30, 1934	
	Deborah R. Cochran	September 18, 1939	
	David B. Cohen (mayor)	September 2, 1947	
	Gerald M. Cohen	February 22, 1934	
	Andrew Collaro	March 21, 1910	
	James G. Collins	August 2, 1946	
	Edward W. Connelly	August 2, 1919	
	Leo R. Corazzini	February 17, 1930	
	Robert Correia	January 3, 1939	
	Nicholas Costello	1935	
	James J. Craven Jr.	March 24, 1919	
	Michael C. Creedon	November 3, 1946	
	John F. Cusack	October 5, 1937	
	Charles Decas	October 5, 1937	
	Walter DeFilippi	October 3, 1926	
	A. Joseph DeNucci	August 30, 1939	
	Salvatore DiMasi	August 11, 1945	
	Stephen W. Doran	March 26, 1956	
	Charles Robert Doyle	September 24, 1925	
	John R. Driscoll	May 9, 1924	
	Dennis J. Duffin	November 24, 1930	
	Frank Emilio (politician)	August 31, 1935	
	Thomas Francis Fallon	December 4, 1929	
	John J. Finnegan	July 21, 1938	
	Thomas Finneran	January 2, 1950	
	Kevin W. Fitzgerald	1950	
	Charles Flaherty (politician)	October 13, 1938	
	Michael F. Flaherty Sr.	September 6, 1936	
	William J. Flynn Jr.	1933	
	Peter Forman	April 28, 1958	
	Bruce N. Freeman	March 4, 1921	
	Thomas M. Gallagher	October 26, 1948	
	William F. Galvin	September 17, 1950	
	Mary Jane Gibson	February 7, 1933	
	William Glodis	April 6, 1934	
	Roger R. Goyette	January 22, 1925	
	Saundra Graham	September 5, 1941	
	Barbara Gray	October 11, 1926	
	John Gray	January 12, 1956	
	Haden Greenhalgh	January 16, 1931	
	Henry Grenier	December 9, 1924	
	James T. Harrington	June 9, 1949	
	Jonathan Healy	October 10, 1945	
	Joseph N. Hermann	June 8, 1924	
	Lucile Hicks	May 11, 1938	
	Iris Holland	September 30, 1920	
	Robert L. Howarth	1942	
	Marie Elizabeth Howe	June 13, 1939	
	Philip W. Johnston	July 21, 1944	
	Raymond A. Jordan Jr.	May 5, 1943	
	Stephen Karol	1948	
	Bill Keating (politician)	September 6, 1952	
	Mel King	October 20, 1928	
	Paul Kollios	February 24, 1936	
	Raymond M. LaFontaine	May 18, 1927	
	Nickolas Lambros	January 9, 1933	
	Denis Lawrence	1940	
	Mark E. Lawton	July 26, 1949	
	Edward LeLacheur	June 1, 1925	
	Kenneth M. Lemanski	January 27, 1954	
	Leon Lombardi	April 16, 1949	
	Michael J. Lombardi	May 27, 1917	
	John Loring	1926	
	Thomas R. Lussier	April 5, 1957	
	Thomas K. Lynch	April 30, 1946	
	Charles Mann	April 27, 1935	
	Frank J. Matrango	July 19, 1926	
	Thomas W. McGee	May 24, 1924	
	Michael J. McGlynn	April 23, 1953	
	Arthur James McKenna	October 29, 1914	
	Charles F. McNally	April 3, 1929	
	John C. McNeil	June 8, 1945	
	Robert D. McNeil	December 16, 1930	
	Joan Menard	September 6, 1935	
	Jim Miceli	March 25, 1935	
	Alfred A. Minahan Jr.	September 14, 1953	
	F. John Monahan	July 3, 1943	
	Richard T. Moore	August 7, 1943	
	William E. Moriarty	October 4, 1923	
	William D. Mullins	August 13, 1931	
	John E. Murphy Jr.	April 3, 1943	
	Mary Jeanette Murray	December 24, 1924	
	William P. Nagle Jr.	June 10, 1951	
	Andrew Natsios	September 22, 1949	
	Joseph M. Navin	May 19, 1946	
	David R. Nelson (politician)	December 14, 1937	
	Lou Nickinello	September 8, 1940	
	Thomas C. Norton	December 11, 1934	
	Nicholas Paleologos	March 9, 1953	
	Marie Parente	May 22, 1928	
	Angelo Picucci	April 12, 1915	
	Steven Pierce	October 10, 1949	
	Vincent J. Piro	1931	
	Kevin Poirier	July 7, 1940	
	Daniel F. Pokaski	June 26, 1949	
	Michael J. Rea Jr.	July 23, 1940	
	William G. Robinson	March 10, 1926	
	Andrew J. Rogers Jr.	May 6, 1944	
	Robert J. Rohan	August 15, 1921	
	Timothy M. Rourke	October 21, 1952	
	J. Michael Ruane	December 10, 1927	
	Alfred E. Saggese Jr.	November 21, 1946	
	Sherman Saltmarsh	April 27, 1929	
	Angelo Scaccia	September 29, 1942	
	Joseph Scelsi	June 4, 1915	
	Susan Schur	February 27, 1940	
	Anthony M. Scibelli	October 16, 1911	
	Emanuel Serra	June 12, 1945	
	Richard R. Silva	March 13, 1922	
	Walter Silveira Jr.	June 15, 1934	
	Charles Silvia	February 18, 1945	
	Theodore C. Speliotis	August 20, 1953	
	Gregory W. Sullivan	January 29, 1952	
	Royall H. Switzler	September 27, 1938	
	Roger Tougas	January 9, 1927	
	Peter Trombley	September 16, 1948	
	Thomas J. Vallely	January 6, 1950	
	Robert A. Vigneau	November 4, 1920	
	Richard Voke	December 2, 1947	
	Richard L. Walsh	July 26, 1948	
	Bruce E. Wetherbee	September 1, 1950	
	W. Paul White	July 7, 1945	
	Thomas P. White	August 27, 1950	
	A. James Whitney	April 15, 1943	
	Francis H. Woodward	March 17, 1939	

== See also ==
- 97th United States Congress
- List of Massachusetts General Courts
