= Genevra R. Counihan =

American politician (1925–2024)

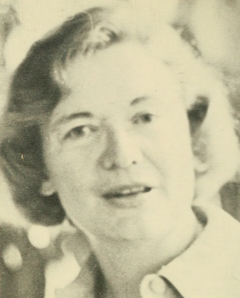

Member of the Massachusetts House of Representatives from the Fortieth Middlesex district
- In office 1975–1978

Personal details
- Born: December 15, 1925 Wichita, Kansas, U.S.
- Died: October 28, 2024 (aged 98) Concord, Massachusetts, U.S.
- Party: Democratic
- Occupation: Lawyer, politician

Genevra Reed Counihan (December 15, 1925 – October 28, 2024) was an American lawyer and Democratic politician from Concord, Massachusetts. She represented the Fortieth Middlesex district in the Massachusetts House of Representatives from 1975 to 1978. Counihan served on the urban affairs and public service committees. She lost a bid to reelection to John H. Loring by only 300 votes.

After leaving the Great and General Court, she was a member of the board of the Metropolitan Area Planning Council. She died in Concord on October 28, 2024, at the age of 98.

== See also ==
- 1975–1976 Massachusetts legislature
- 1977–1978 Massachusetts legislature
