= George Keverian =

American politician (1931-2009)

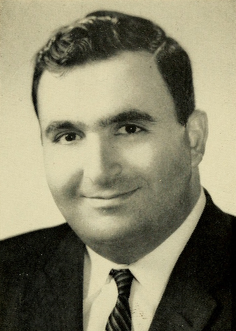
- Kervian circa 1967

Speaker of the Massachusetts House of Representatives
- In office January 1985 – January 1991
- Preceded by: Thomas W. McGee
- Succeeded by: Charles Flaherty

Majority Leader of the Massachusetts House of Representatives
- In office 1978–1983
- Preceded by: William Q. MacLean Jr.
- Succeeded by: John E. Murphy Jr.

Member of the Massachusetts House of Representatives from Middlesex County
- In office 1967–1991
- Preceded by: William H. Finnegan
- Succeeded by: Edward G. Connolly
- Constituency: 20th Middlesex; 39th Middlesex

Chief Assessor of Everett, Massachusetts
- In office 1995–2007

Alderman of Everett, Massachusetts
- In office 1961–1967

President of the Common Council of Everett, Massachusetts
- In office 1960–1961

Member of the Common Council of Everett, Massachusetts
- In office 1954–1961

Personal details
- Born: June 3, 1931 Everett, Massachusetts
- Died: March 6, 2009 (aged 77) Everett, Massachusetts
- Resting place: Glenwood Cemetery; Everett, Massachusetts
- Party: Democratic
- Education: Harvard College; Harvard Law School

Military service
- Allegiance: United States of America
- Branch/service: Army

George Keverian (June 3, 1931 – March 6, 2009) was an American Democratic Party politician who served as the Speaker of the Massachusetts House of Representatives from 1985 until 1991. In his role in the legislature, he was an advocate for greater openness in leadership, free speech and government reform.

== Early life and education ==
George Keverian was born in Everett, Massachusetts, located in Middlesex County, near Boston. Keverian was the son of Armenian parents who immigrated to America from Turkey before 1915; his mother was a dressmaker and his father ran a shoe repair business.

Keverian attended Everett High School where he was a champion runner the valedictorian of the class of 1949. Keverian attended Tufts College for two years before transferring to Harvard College. Keverian graduated from Harvard in 1953.

== Early political career ==
He was elected to the City of Everett Common Council in 1954 at the age of 21, shortly after his graduation from Harvard. Running for three seats in a field of three dozen, Keverian used a high-speed motion picture camera suggested by his brother that could capture still images of each house in the ward. He sent an individualized flier to each house with a photo of their own home and a message about the attention he would offer the neighborhood. He served on the Common Council until 1961, serving as President of the Common Council from 1960 to 1961.

== Massachusetts House of Representatives ==
In 1966, Keverian was elected to represent the 20th Middlesex District in the Massachusetts House of Representatives.

From 1975 to 1978 Keverian was the House Majority Whip, the number three leadership position in the Massachusetts House of Representatives. In 1978 Keverian was chosen to be the House Majority Leader, the number two leadership position in the Massachusetts House of Representatives.

== Speaker of the Massachusetts House of Representatives ==
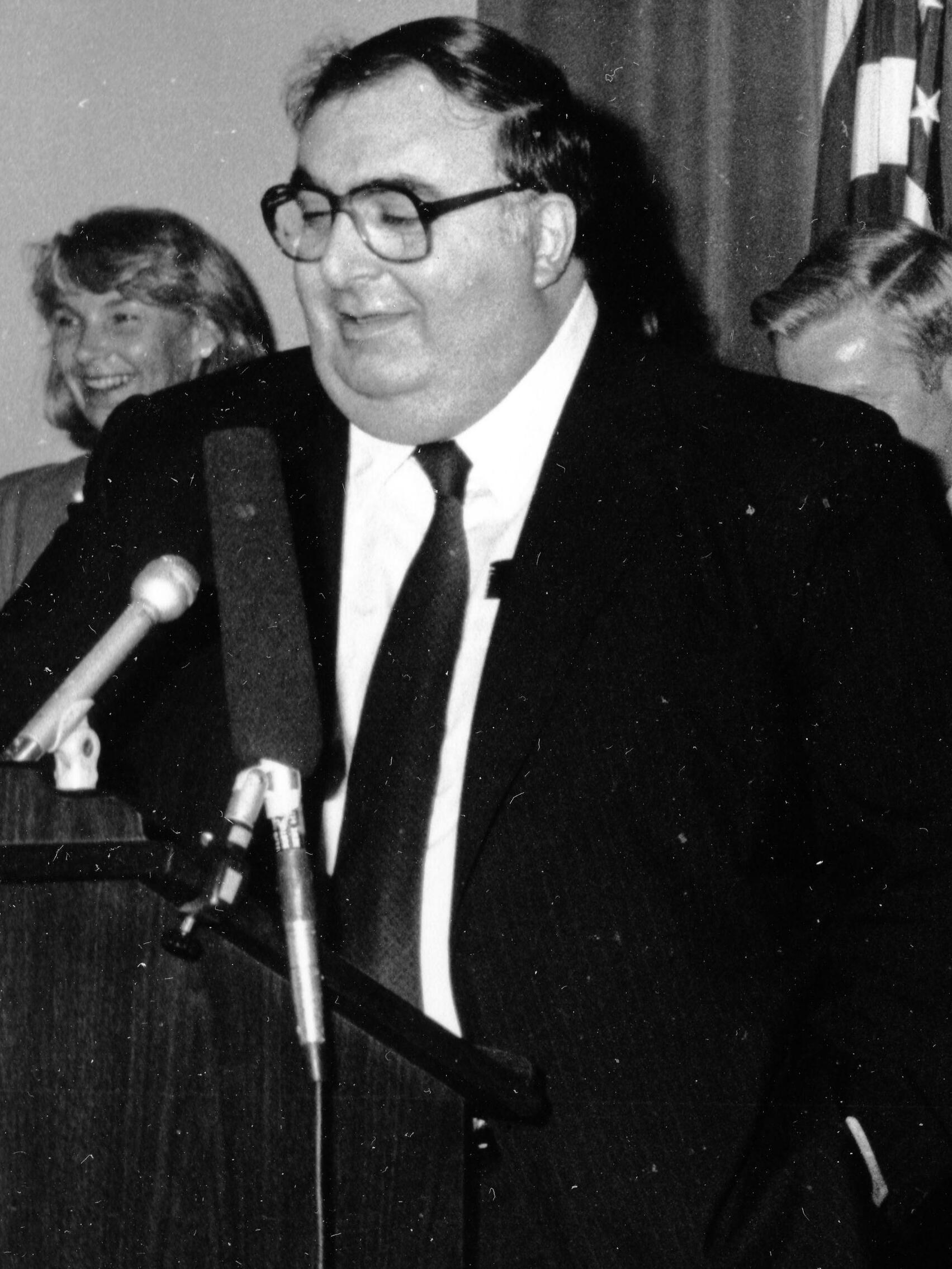
Kervian in the 1980s

Serving in the Massachusetts House of Representatives, he won the position as Speaker of the House from fellow Democrat Thomas W. McGee in January 1985, bringing reformers in the legislature to back his candidacy. Though he was able to bring greater openness, he had difficulties as a leader and in pushing through legislation. He left the post, and state politics, in 1991, after losing the Democratic party primary for Massachusetts State Treasurer.

== Later life ==
He returned to Everett, where he was appointed as the city's chief assessor in 1995. He lost the position in 2007, with Keverian claiming that he had lost the post due to conflicts with the city's mayor; the mayor stated that the position had been eliminated.

Weighing as much as 400 pounds by 2002, Keverian blamed his place in the public eye for his weight problems, telling a 2003 forum on obesity at the Harvard School of Public Health that "People can be very, very cruel, even when they're not trying to be" and that "Having all that publicity and public acceptance worked against me". He was able to bring his weight down to 260 pounds following gastric bypass surgery in 2002.

The George Keverian School in Everett, Massachusetts is named after him. Keverian had been scheduled to read a Dr. Seuss book to first-graders at the school on the day of his death.

== Death and burial ==
Keverian died at age 77, on March 6, 2009. He was buried in Glenwood Cemetery in Everett, Massachusetts.

== See also ==
- 1967–1968 Massachusetts legislature
- 1969–1970 Massachusetts legislature
- 1971–1972 Massachusetts legislature
- 1973–1974 Massachusetts legislature
- 1975–1976 Massachusetts legislature
- 1977–1978 Massachusetts legislature
- 1979–1980 Massachusetts legislature
- 1981–1982 Massachusetts legislature
- 1983–1984 Massachusetts legislature
- 1985–1986 Massachusetts legislature
- 1987–1988 Massachusetts legislature
- 1989–1990 Massachusetts legislature

== Bibliography ==
- Heslam, Jessica.: The Boston Herald, Longtime pol George Keverian found dead Former House speaker, fondly remembered by colleagues, friends, was 77, (March 7, 2009).
- O'Neill, Edward B.: Public officers of the Commonwealth of Massachusetts, page 83, (1985).
- O'Neill, Edward B.: Public officers of the Commonwealth of Massachusetts, page 164, (1983).

Massachusetts House of Representatives
Preceded by Thomas W. McGee	Speaker of the Massachusetts House of Representatives; 1985–1991	Succeeded by Charles F. Flaherty, Jr.
Preceded by William Q. MacLean, Jr.	Majority Leader of the Massachusetts House of Representatives; 1978–1983	Succeeded by John E. Murphy Jr.
Preceded by William Q. MacLean, Jr.	Majority Whip of the Massachusetts House of Representatives; 1975–1978	Succeeded by John E. Murphy Jr.
