= Thomas Lussier =

Thomas Lussier is an American politician who served in the Massachusetts House of Representatives. When he took office in 1977, he became the youngest person ever to serve in that body, a record that holds as of 2026.
