= Thomas W. McGee =

American politician (1924-2012)

Thomas William McGee
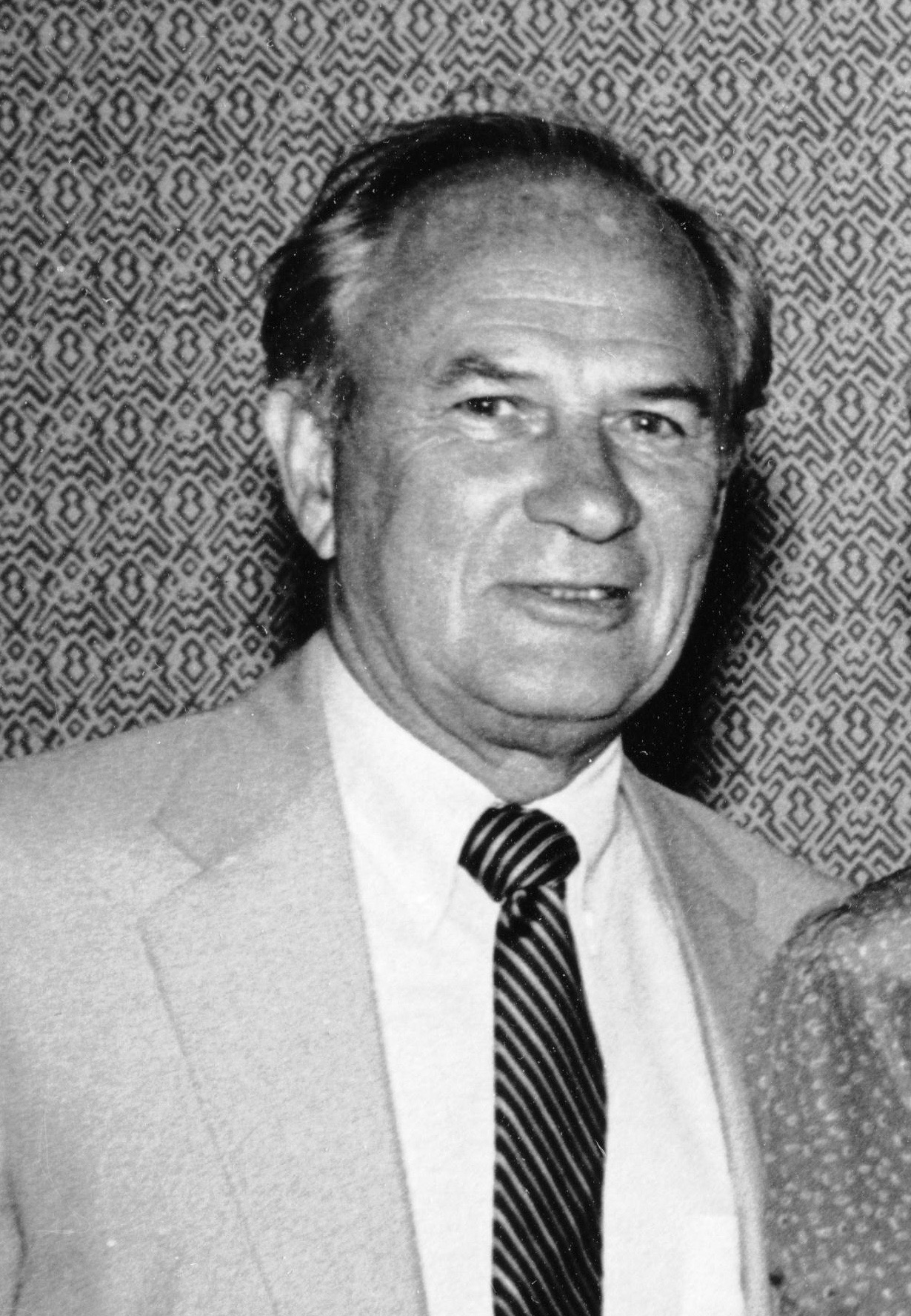

80th Speaker of the Massachusetts House of Representatives
- In office 1975–1984
- Preceded by: David M. Bartley
- Succeeded by: George Keverian

Majority Leader of the Massachusetts House of Representatives
- In office 1969–1975
- Preceded by: David M. Bartley
- Succeeded by: William Q. MacLean, Jr.

Member of the Massachusetts House of Representatives
- In office 1963–1991
- Preceded by: George J. O'Shea, Jr.
- Succeeded by: Edward J. Clancy, Jr.

Member of the Lynn City Council
- In office 1956–1963

Personal details
- Born: May 24, 1924 Lynn, Massachusetts, U.S.
- Died: December 21, 2012 (aged 88) Danvers, Massachusetts, U.S.
- Resting place: Pine Grove Cemetery Lynn, Massachusetts
- Party: Democratic Party
- Spouse(s): Ann Sorrenti, div. Grace Hogan
- Education: Boston University; Boston University Law School, 1953
- Profession: Politician

Military service
- Allegiance: United States of America
- Branch/service: United States Marine Corps
- Years of service: 1941–1945
- Rank: Fourth Marine Division
- Battles/wars: World War II; Battle of Saipan; Battle of Iwo Jima; Battle of Tinian
- Awards: Navy & Marine Corps Medal; American Defense Service; Asiatic-Pacific Campaign World War II Victory

Thomas William McGee (May 24, 1924 – December 21, 2012) was an American politician who served as a member of the Lynn, Massachusetts City Council (1956–1963) and Democratic member of the Massachusetts House of Representatives (1963–1991), serving as its Speaker from 1975 to 1984. He was the father of former Massachusetts state Senator and Mayor of Lynn Thomas M. McGee.

McGee died on December 21, 2012 in a hospice facility in Danvers, Massachusetts, of complications from Alzheimer's.

== See also ==
- 1963–1964 Massachusetts legislature
- 1965–1966 Massachusetts legislature
- 1967–1968 Massachusetts legislature
- 1969–1970 Massachusetts legislature
- 1971–1972 Massachusetts legislature
- 1973–1974 Massachusetts legislature
- 1975–1976 Massachusetts legislature
- 1977–1978 Massachusetts legislature
- 1979–1980 Massachusetts legislature
- 1981–1982 Massachusetts legislature
- 1983–1984 Massachusetts legislature
- 1985–1986 Massachusetts legislature
- 1987–1988 Massachusetts legislature
- 1989–1990 Massachusetts legislature

Massachusetts House of Representatives
Preceded by David M. Bartley	Majority Leader of the Massachusetts House of Representatives; 1969 – 1975	Succeeded by William Q. MacLean, Jr.
Preceded by David M. Bartley	Speaker of the Massachusetts House of Representatives; 1975 – 1984	Succeeded by George Keverian
