= Charles Flaherty (politician) =

American politician (born 1938)

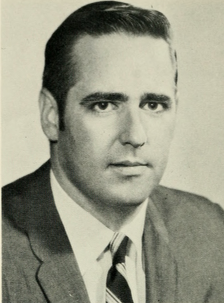
- Charles Flaherty, 1983

Speaker of the Massachusetts House of Representatives
- In office January 2, 1991 – April 1, 1996
- Preceded by: George Keverian
- Succeeded by: Thomas Finneran

Majority Leader of the Massachusetts House of Representatives
- In office January 2, 1985 – January 2, 1991
- Preceded by: W. Paul White
- Succeeded by: Richard A. Voke

Member of the Massachusetts House of Representatives from the 27th Middlesex district
- In office January 1979 – April 1, 1996
- Preceded by: Sherman Saltmarsh, Jr.
- Succeeded by: Alice Wolf

Member of the Massachusetts House of Representatives from the 3rd Middlesex district
- In office January 1967 – January 1979
- Preceded by: Timothy W. Hickey
- Succeeded by: Paul Cellucci

Personal details
- Born: October 13, 1938 (age 87) Boston, Massachusetts
- Party: Democratic Party
- Education: Boston College

Charles F. Flaherty (born October 13, 1938, in Boston, Massachusetts) is a former U.S. politician who served as a Democratic member of the Massachusetts House of Representatives from 1967 to 1996. He was the House Majority Leader from 1985 to 1990 and the Speaker of the House from 1991 to 1996.

In 1996, Flaherty agreed to plead guilty to felony tax evasion for submitting false receipts regarding his business expenses. In addition, he also admitted to civil violations of state conflict of interest law for receiving free vacation housing from lobbyists. He stepped down as house Speaker and was fined $50,000.

== See also ==
- 1967–1968 Massachusetts legislature
- 1969–1970 Massachusetts legislature
- 1971–1972 Massachusetts legislature
- 1973–1974 Massachusetts legislature
- 1975–1976 Massachusetts legislature
- 1977–1978 Massachusetts legislature
- 1979–1980 Massachusetts legislature
- 1981–1982 Massachusetts legislature
- 1983–1984 Massachusetts legislature
- 1985–1986 Massachusetts legislature
- 1987–1988 Massachusetts legislature
- 1989–1990 Massachusetts legislature
- 1991–1992 Massachusetts legislature
- 1993–1994 Massachusetts legislature
- 1995–1996 Massachusetts legislature

Party political offices
Preceded by Robert Q. Crane	Chairman of the Massachusetts Democratic Party; 1971–1977	Succeeded by Chester G. Atkins
Massachusetts House of Representatives
Preceded by George Keverian	Speaker of the Massachusetts House of Representatives; January 2, 1991–April 1, 1996	Succeeded by Thomas Finneran
