= Barbara Gray (politician) =

American politician (1926–2014)

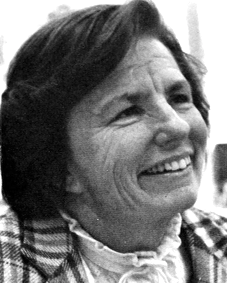

Member of the Massachusetts House of Representatives from the 6th Middlesex district
- In office January 3, 1979 – December 31, 1996

Member of the Massachusetts House of Representatives from the 56th Middlesex district
- In office January 1, 1975 – July 12, 1978

Member of the Massachusetts House of Representatives from the 39th Middlesex district
- In office January 3, 1973 – August 2, 1974

Personal details
- Born: Barbara E. Gantz; October 11, 1926 New York City
- Died: March 28, 2014 (aged 87) Hyannis, Massachusetts
- Education: Connecticut College (BA); University of Oxford; Western New England College (MPA)

Barbara E. Gray (née Gantz; October 11, 1926 – March 28, 2014) was an American Democratic politician from Framingham, Massachusetts. She represented the 39th Middlesex district from 1973 to 1974, the 56th Middlesex district from 1975 to 1978, and the 6th Middlesex district from 1979 to 1996 in the Massachusetts House of Representatives. She was first elected as a Republican, but switched parties in October 1990.

== Early life ==
Gray was born in New York City on October 11, 1926. Her father, Gerald Gantz, was a Republican stockbroker and her mother, Marcella Gantz (née Beck) was described as a "closet Democrat". She was rebellious in high school until her parents enrolled her in a more rigorous private school.

After graduation, she attended Connecticut College where she met Richard Gray. She received her B.A. in 1948 and, after turning down Richard's first marriage proposal, travelled around Europe with a friend, where she attended the Institute of International Education at the University of Oxford. After she returned to Massachusetts, she agreed to marry Richard and they moved to Framingham. She later graduated from Western New England College with a Masters of Public Administration.

Gray worked in public relations for the American Association for the United Nations, as a columnist and editor for a newspaper in Hartford, Connecticut, and in advertising for Esquire.

== Political career ==
Gray was first elected to the Massachusetts House of Representatives in 1972, serving in the 168th Massachusetts General Court as a Republican representative of the 39th Middlesex district. She was one of only eight women out of a total of 240 legislators. In 1974, she was re-elected to the House, serving as representative for the 56th Middlesex district until 1978. She would serve on the Ways and means committee from 1974 to 1992. In 1979, Gray was elected as a representative in the House for the 6th Middlesex district, a position she would hold until 1996. She served on the Rules committee in 1992, as Chair of the Counties committee in 1993, as Chair of the Local Affairs committee in 1994, and as Chair of the Natural Resources and Agriculture committee from 1995 to 1996.

In 1990, she lost the Republican primary and so she switched to the Democratic Party and won the general election to hold her seat. She advocated for women's and children's rights, environmental protection, health and safety, and land use. She focused on legislation relating to mandatory seat-belt laws, river protection, and zoning. She supported gay rights and proposed legislation after Harvey Milk's 1978 assassination. In 2002, she published a memoir on her time in the legislature, titled A Woman's Ways & Means.

Gray was heavily involved in local politics outside her position in the Massachusetts House of Representatives. In the 1970s, she worked with other activists to create the Wayside Youth and Family Support Network, a regional social services agency, and in 1985, she helped found WIN Haven, the first shelter for abused women in the region. She also served on the Framingham Planning Board (which she was the first woman elected to), the Charter Commission, and the Metropolitan Area Planning Council. She helped found the Massachusetts Caucus of Women Legislators as well as the Framingham chapter of the League of Women Voters.

== Personal life ==
Gray and her husband divorced after thirty years of marriage and she met Norman E. Gardner, a graphic designer, while campaigning in Framingham. They married in August 1985 and were together until his death in 2004. Gray had four children: Suzanne, Linda, Nancy, and John. After retiring in 1996, she moved to Wellfleet, Massachusetts.

Gray died on March 28, 2014, in Cape Cod Hospital, Hyannis, Massachusetts from complications following a stroke.
