= Robert Owens (politician) =

American politician (1946–2022)

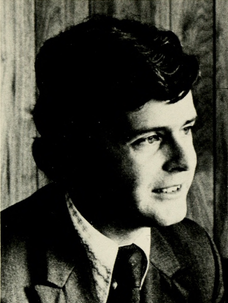
Robert Owens in 1975

Robert Ignatius Owens (October 7, 1946 – February 4, 2022) was an American politician and businessman.

Owens was born in Worcester, Massachusetts, and grew up in Framingham, Massachusetts. He went to St. Stephens School and Marian High School in Framingham, Massachusetts. Owens graduated from Harvard College in 1968. He served in the United States Navy during the Vietnam War in 1969. In 1972, he served as an administrative aide to Massachusetts state senator Ed Burke. Owens served in the Massachusetts House of Representatives from 1973 to 1975 and was a Democrat. Owens then served as an administrative assistant to United States Representative Robert Drinan. Owens was involved in the newspaper and real estate businesses. He died on February 4, 2022, at the age of 75.
