= Stephen McGrail =

American politician

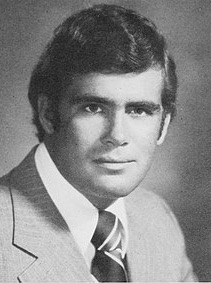

Member of the Massachusetts Senate
- In office 1973–1977
- Preceded by: Fred I. Lamson
- Succeeded by: John A. Brennan, Jr.

Personal details
- Born: September 23, 1948 (age 78) Melrose, Massachusetts
- Party: Democratic
- Education: Northeastern University; Suffolk University Law School
- Occupation: Attorney

Stephen John McGrail is an American politician who served in the Massachusetts Senate.

== Early life ==
McGrail was born on September 23, 1948, in Melrose, Massachusetts. He graduated from Wakefield Memorial High School, Northeastern University, and Suffolk University Law School.

== Politics ==
McGrail served on the Wakefield, Massachusetts Board of Selectmen from 1971 to 1973. Elected at age 22, he is the youngest Selectman to serve in the Town's history. In 1972 Steve McGrail defeated 20-year incumbent Fred I. Lamson (R-Malden) to become the youngest State Senator in the history of the Commonwealth of Massachusetts. From 1973 to 1977, he represented the 4th Middlesex District in the Massachusetts Senate. In 1976, he relinquished his State Senate seat to become a candidate for Massachusetts's 7th congressional district seat previously held by Torbert MacDonald. He finished fourth in a twelve candidate Democratic primary won by Ed Markey.

In 1977, McGrail was appointed Assistant District Attorney (ADA) for Middlesex County by District Attorney John J. Droney and served under First Assistant John Kerry. McGrail served two years as an ADA before being appointed by President Jimmy Carter in November 1979 as the first Regional Director of the Federal Emergency Management Agency (FEMA) for Region I. McGrail left FEMA in February 1981 after President Ronald Reagan assumed office.

From 1981 to 1999, McGrail ran a general law practice in Wakefield.

In 1986, McGrail challenged and lost to incumbent Middlesex District Attorney Scott Harshbarger in the Democratic primary. In 1990, McGrail ran for the Massachusetts Senate seat in the Middlesex and Essex district, but lost in the Democratic primary to Mike Festa.

McGrail also was elected and served as a Commissioner of the Wakefield Municipal Light & Gas Department and served on the Wakefield Finance Committee.

In 1999 Governor Paul Cellucci (R) appointed McGrail as Director of the Massachusetts Emergency Management Agency (MEMA) where he served until 2004. McGrail has continued to work in emergency management as a consultant/lawyer since his retirement from state service. Following Hurricane Sandy he served as a consultant for the State of New York, Division of Homeland Security and Emergency Services (DHSES), working to restore critical infrastructure with New York City's Office of Management and Budget (OMB) and the Metropolitan Transportation Authority (MTA). In the aftermath of Hurricane Harvey, McGrail consulted for the Houston Housing Authority in their recovery efforts to bring back critical housing units to the City of Houston, TX.
