= John Rucho =

American politician (1922–2015)

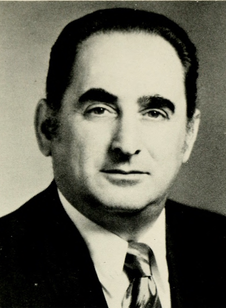

John Rucho (November 22, 1922 – February 22, 2015) was a member of the Massachusetts House of Representatives and an American businessman.

Born in Providence, Rhode Island, he moved with his family to Worcester, Massachusetts. He went to Commerce High School and Becker Junior College. From 1942 to 1945, Rucho served in the United States Navy in World War II as a 3rd class petty officer and a combat veteran on the USS Custer and Newberry, and courageously fought on an amphibious assault squadron at Iwo Jima, Okinawa, and the Marshall Islands. Upon returning he went to Simmons School of Floral Design in Wellesley, Massachusetts. In 1946, Rucho along with his brothers opened Dian's Flower Shop in Worcester, Ma. In 1967, Rucho embarked on another venture with the establishment of Crest Jewelers in Worcester. From 1973 to 1979, Rucho served as a Democrat in the Massachusetts House of Representatives from the Main South region and served for three terms. He served on the Joint Committee on Post Audit and Oversight and the Committees on Election Laws and State Administration. He filed legislation in areas of welfare reform, property tax relief, and campaign financing. He also served a term as Commissioner of Hope Cemetery. After his political career he continued working as a public servant for the Worcester County, Massachusetts Sheriff department until retirement. Upon retirement Rucho spent his remaining years residing in both St. Petersburg, Florida, and Worcester, Massachusetts.

Rucho married Judith. He died on February 22, 2015. He was buried in Hope Cemetery in Worcester.
