= David Lane (Massachusetts politician) =

American politician (1927–2020)

David J. Lane
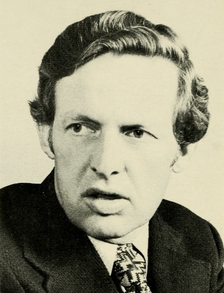
- The Portrait of David Lane

Member of the Massachusetts House of Representatives from the 2nd Essex district
- In office 1973–1978
- Preceded by: James B. Moseley
- Succeeded by: John Gray

Personal details
- Born: July 6, 1927 Gloucester, Massachusetts
- Died: February 13, 2020 (aged 92) Essex, Massachusetts
- Party: Republican
- Spouse: Claire Beckman
- Children: Heather Lane Daley; Jud Lane
- Parents: Roy Lane (father); Clara Clark (mother)

David J. Lane (July 6, 1927 – February 13, 2020) was an American politician from Massachusetts who served in that state's House of Representatives.

== Personal life ==
He was an insurance agent, and was the Chairman of Hastings-Tapley Insurance Agency. He graduated from Harvard University.

== Political career ==
He served in the Massachusetts House of Representatives from 1973 to 1978, representing the 2nd Essex district. He served as Essex Town Moderator for 25 years.

== Electoral history ==
1970 Massachusetts 2nd Essex District State Representative Republican Primary

David J. Lane (R) 43.7%
Christopher S. Hyland (R) 35.0%
William F. Mackenzie (R) 21.3%

1972 Massachusetts 2nd Essex District State Representative General Election

David J. Lane (R) 58.2%
Paul J. Gillespie (D) 41.8%

1974 Massachusetts 2nd Essex District State Representative General Election

David J. Lane (R) (inc.) 100.0%

1976 Massachusetts 2nd Essex District State Representative General Election

David J. Lane (R) (inc.) 75.6%
Paul Henry Dunn (D) 24.4%
