= B. Joseph Tully =

American politician (1927–2015)

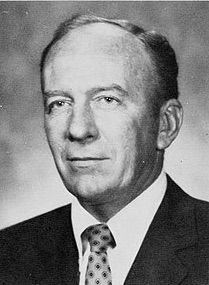
- B. Joseph Tully, circa 1975

City Manager of Lowell, Massachusetts
- In office 1979–1987
- Preceded by: William Taupier
- Succeeded by: James Campbell

Member of the Massachusetts Senate from the First Middlesex District
- In office 1971–1979
- Preceded by: John E. Harrington, Jr.
- Succeeded by: Philip L. Shea

Personal details
- Born: January 4, 1927 Lowell, Massachusetts
- Died: November 1, 2015 (aged 88) Lowell, Massachusetts
- Party: Democratic
- Education: Boston University
- Occupation: Manufacturer's agent Politician; City Manager

Bernard Joseph Tully was an American politician, twice convicted on federal corruption charges, who served in the Massachusetts Senate and was City Manager of Lowell, Massachusetts.

Tully was born on January 4, 1927, and died on November 1, 2015, in Lowell, Massachusetts. He attended Boston University. Prior to his election to the state senate, Tully worked as a manufacturer's agent as was a member of the Dracut, Massachusetts Board of Selectmen.

From 1971 to 1979, Tully represented the First Middlesex District in the Massachusetts Senate. He resigned from the Senate after he was selected by the Lowell City Council to serve as city manager. He remained city manager until his retirement in 1987.

In 1988, Tully was found guilty of attempted extortion and mail fraud and sentenced to three years in federal prison in a case involving a land swap made with an auto dealership during his tenure as city manager.

In 2011 he pleaded guilty to one count of wire fraud after he took $12,000 worth of bribes from a Lowell landlord who was looking for the Registry of Motor Vehicles to renew its lease with him. Tully reached out to the owner and told him that if he paid him he would pay off a state senator and help keep the Registry office open. Tully and a partner pocketed the bribes and did not pay off any public officials.
