= Vincent J. Piro =

American politician (1941–2019)

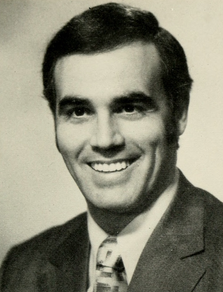
Portrait of Vincent J. Piro

Vincent J. Piro (1941–2019) was a politician who served for 16 years as a member of the Massachusetts State legislature.

Piro was raised in Somerville, Massachusetts and attended college at Salem State University. He then worked as an educator before entering politics.

He first served as an alderman in Somerville and later was a member of the state legislature. In 1985 he was tried on bribery charges but the jury ruled him not guilty.

== Sources ==
- Andersen, Travis (July 23, 2019). "Vinnie Piro, colorful figure in Mass. politics, dies at 78". The Boston Globe.
