= Joseph Scelsi =

American politician

Joseph Salvatore Scelsi (June 4, 1915 – April 1, 2002) was an American politician.

Born in Pittsfield, Massachusetts, Scelsi graduated from Pittsfield High School in 1934. He worked as the foreman for the Railway Express Agency for thirty-six years retiring in 1971. Scelsi served on the Pittsfield City Council from 1958 until 1971 and was president of the city council. Scelsi was involved with the Democratic Party. From 1973 until 1983, Scelsi served in the Massachusetts House of Representatives. Scelsi died in Pittsfield, Massachusetts. The Joseph Scelsi Intermodal Transportation Center in Pittsfield was named after Scelsi in 2004.
