= Fred Cain =

American politician

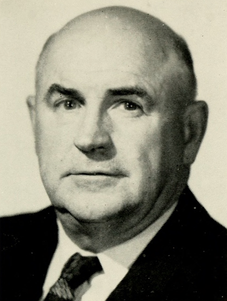

Fred F. Cain (November 5, 1909 – May 17, 1977) was an American politician.

Cain was born in Arlington, Massachusetts on November 5, 1909, and attended Woburn Memorial High School. He became a salesman, and in 1936, began running his own car dealership. He became known as a proponent for widening and adding more exits to Interstate 93. In 1964, Cain ended his involvement with the dealership he had founded, to run for a seat on the Massachusetts House of Representatives, on which he served a total of twelve years. From at least 1971 to 1975 he held the 25th Middlesex district seat. He then won election from the 36th Middlesex district in 1974 and 1976. Cain died on May 17, 1977, at Massachusetts General Hospital, aged 67. His wife Ann died in 2011, aged 99.
