= Arthur Joseph Lewis Jr. =

American politician (born 1934)

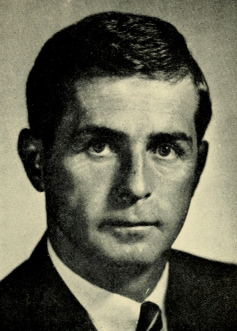
Arthur Lewis Portrait

Arthur Joseph Lewis Jr. (born September 3, 1934) served in the Massachusetts House of Representatives in 1970 and the Massachusetts Senate as a Democrat from 1972 to 1990.
