= John G. King (politician) =

American politician

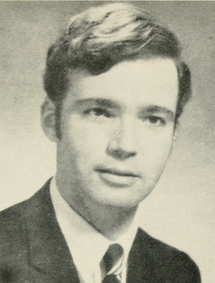
- King c. 1975

Member of the Massachusetts Senate from the Second Essex district
- In office 1979–1983
- Preceded by: Kevin B. Harrington
- Succeeded by: Frederick Berry

Member of the Massachusetts House of Representatives from the 7th Essex district
- In office 1975–1979

Member of the Massachusetts House of Representatives from the 6th Essex district
- In office 1971–1975

Personal details
- Born: November 30, 1942 (age 83) Beverly, Massachusetts
- Party: Democratic
- Education: Boston University; Suffolk University Law School
- Occupation: Attorney

John G. King is an American politician who served in the Massachusetts House of Representatives from 1971 to 1979 and the Massachusetts Senate from 1979 to 1983.

Raised and educated in Danvers, Massachusetts, where he resides to this day, King has had a successful legal practice now based in Salem, Massachusetts.
