= Felix Perrault =

American politician

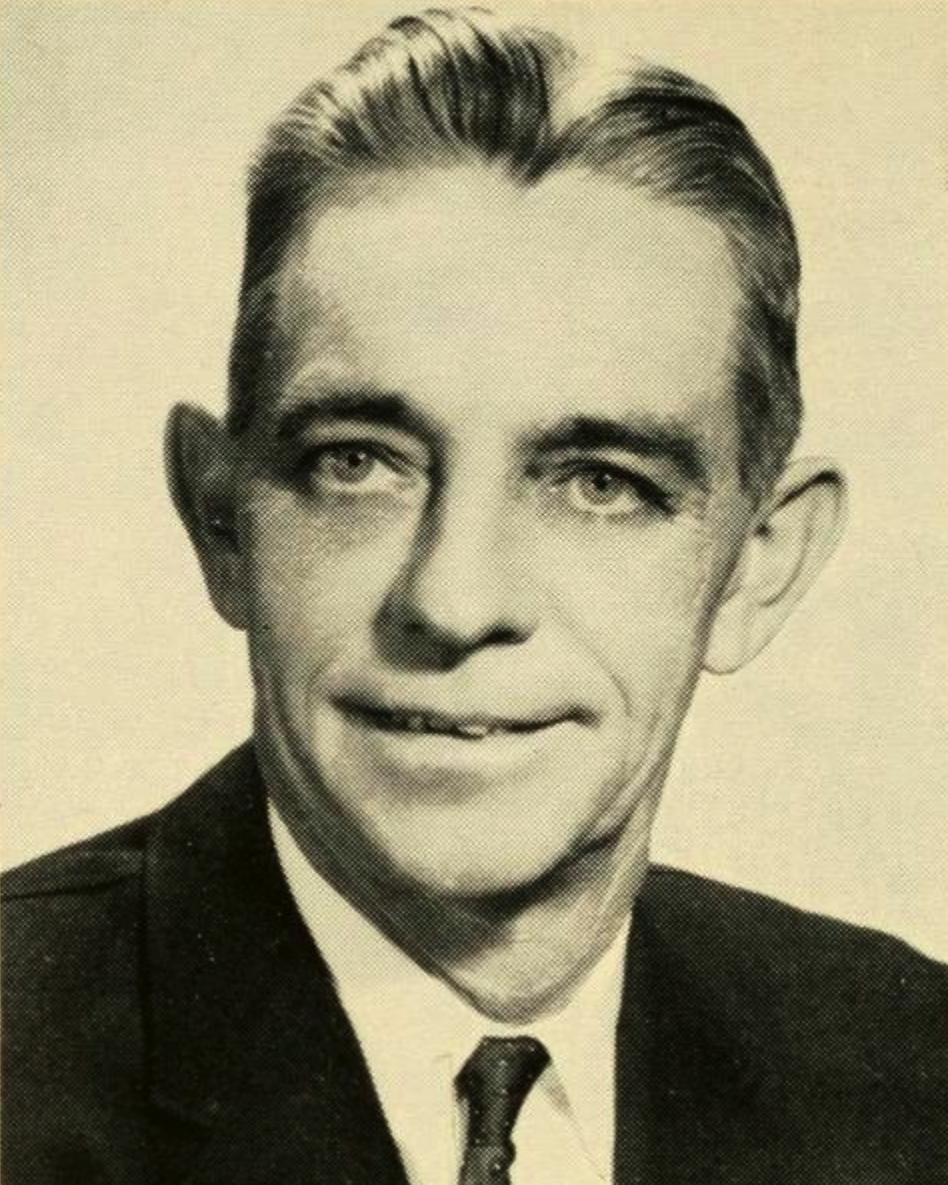

Member of the Massachusetts House of Representatives
- In office January 6, 1965 – January 3, 1979
- District: 12th Middlesex (1965‍–‍1969); 34th Middlesex (1969‍–‍1975); 49th Middlesex (1975‍–‍1979)
- Preceded by: John Brox
- Succeeded by: Walter Bickford

Personal details
- Born: Felix Raymond Perrault; October 27, 1915 Lowell, Massachusetts, U.S.
- Died: September 11, 1986 (aged 70) Lowell, Massachusetts, U.S.
- Party: Democratic
- Spouse: Eleanor O'Hara
- Education: Lowell Technological Institute

Felix Raymond "Phil" Perrault (October 27, 1915 – September 11, 1986) was an American politician who served seven terms in the Massachusetts House of Representatives. A member of the Democratic Party, he was first elected in 1964, defeating incumbent representative John Brox.
