= Roger L. Bernashe =

American politician

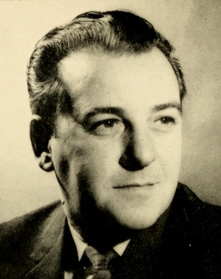
- Bernashe c. 1967

Member of the Massachusetts State Senate
- In office 1971–1979
- Preceded by: Maurice A. Donahue
- Succeeded by: John P. Burke

Member of the Massachusetts House of Representatives from the 3rd Hampden district
- In office 1959–1971
- Preceded by: George R. Como
- Succeeded by: Richard H. Demers

Personal details
- Born: September 9, 1927 Chicopee, Massachusetts
- Died: December 26, 2014 (aged 87) Chicopee, Massachusetts
- Party: Democratic
- Education: University of Massachusetts Amherst

Roger Leo Bernashe (1927-2014) was an American politician who served in the Massachusetts House of Representatives from 1959 to 1971 and the Massachusetts Senate from 1971 to 1979. Outside politics he worked in insurance and real estate.

== See also ==
- Obituary
