= William Q. MacLean Jr. =

American politician (1934–2026)

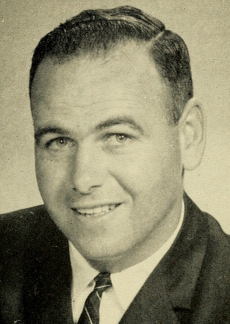
- Official portrait, 1967

Member of the Massachusetts Senate
- In office 1981–1993
- Preceded by: Robert M. Hunt
- Succeeded by: Mark Montigny

Member of the Massachusetts House of Representatives
- In office 1961–1981
- Preceded by: Maunel Faria
- Succeeded by: Walter Silveira Jr.

Personal details
- Born: William Quincy Maclean Jr. November 4, 1934 New Bedford, Massachusetts, U.S.
- Died: February 20, 2026 (aged 91)
- Party: Democratic
- Spouse(s): Martha George (m. 1956; div. 1976) Marjorie McCarthy (m. 1977; died 1995) Mary Jane Moran O'Donnell (m. 1998)
- Children: 3
- Education: University of Massachusetts
- Occupation: Insurance agent Politician

William Quincy MacLean Jr. (November 4, 1934 – February 20, 2026) was an American politician who served in the Massachusetts General Court from 1961 to 1993, serving in the Massachusetts House of Representatives from 1961 to 1981 and in the Massachusetts Senate from 1981 to 1993. A member of the Democratic Party, he was a part of House leadership from 1972 to 1978, serving as majority whip and then majority leader until he resigned from leadership amid a conflict with Speaker Thomas W. McGee. He gained the nickname "Mr. December" for his ability to get bills passed in the final month of a legislative session. He did not seek reelection in 1992 and was convicted of violating a conflict-of-interest law in 1993, paying the largest conflict-of-interest fine in state history and losing his pension.

== Early life ==
MacLean was born in New Bedford, Massachusetts, on November 4, 1934. He soon gained the nickname "Biff". He attended public schools in Fairhaven, Massachusetts, and started playing high school varsity sports at Fairhaven High School in the last year of middle school. He continued to play sports while he attended that school, playing five sports and accumulating 14 varsity letters before he graduated in 1954. He then attended the University of Massachusetts for two years but dropped out in 1956 after being injured in football. After dropping out, he worked as a salesman at his father's seafood business. In 1959, he joined the Fairhaven police department as a reserve officer. He worked in real estate, as an insurance broker, and also had interests in four fishing trawlers. In the 1970s, he graduated from the University of Massachusetts's University Without Walls program with a degree in political science.

== Political career ==
MacLean began his political career as a member of the Fairhaven school committee. In 1960 he was elected to the Massachusetts House of Representatives. He became the House majority whip in 1972; his lack of oratorical skill was compensated by his skill at counting votes. In July 1975, Speaker Thomas W. McGee made him House majority leader, the job McGee had held until he succeeded speaker David M. Bartley. McGee told MacLean that he would make a good majority leader and strong right arm; observers found that the former was debatable and the latter true. In January 1977, he temporarily assumed the responsibilities of the speakership after McGee was injured in a skiing accident; Republicans and progressive Democrats were skeptical of him. James Smith, a progressive representative who had clashed with McGee, said that the House would lack leadership with MacLean in charge, saying he lacked the members' respect.

He resigned as majority leader in July 1978 due to frustrations with McGee surrounding a racing bill. He had previously threatened resignation in disputes, but he had never gone so far as to resign. MacLean said he opposed the racing bill because it treated three Bristol County tracks unfairly; observers noted that the bill would have damaged one of his friends' racing business. Due to his prodigious fundraising, spectators believed that his resignation was the beginning of a plan to unseat McGee as speaker. One representative commented that MacLean would never be satisfied until he was speaker. It quickly became apparent that his bid needed a "miracle" or an unlikely alliance of progressive Democrats, opportunistic legislators, and Republicans to succeed. MacLean portrayed himself as a reformer, which his colleagues could not believe due to his extensive ties to special interests. His speakership bid failed to materialize and McGee was easily reelected as speaker, supported by all Democrats except MacLean and two others.

With his aspirations for House leadership dead, MacLean aimed to start over in the Senate and so he challenged incumbent state senator Robert M. Hunt for his seat in the Bristol and Plymouth district. MacLean defeated Hunt 51% to 40% in the Democratic primary and beat Republican Brett W. Thacher 67% to 33% in the general election. He then ran unopposed until 1990 when he beat Hunt, who had become a Republican, 67% to 33%. In the Senate, he chaired a committee which Senator David H. Locke called "the largest above-ground grave in the state", as any bill Senate leadership opposed would die in his committee. MacLean did not seek reelection in 1992.

During his tenure in the legislature, MacLean gained the nickname "Mr. December" for his ability to get bills passed during the last month of the legislative session. In the House, MacLean was described as a loyal supporter of Democratic leadership and the chief fundraiser among Democrats in 1977. McGee was a conservative and the Massachusetts Civil Liberties Union once gave him a rating of zero. He was viewed as tough and heavy-handed, but also as compromising. He gained a reputation for working on behalf of a number of special interest groups, including beer distributors, the real estate industry, and racetracks. He was also an ally of business and universities in Southeastern Massachusetts. MacLean defended himself from the special interest accusations by saying that he was "business-oriented" and "pro-jobs".

=== Conflict of interest conviction ===
In 1989, The Boston Globe reported that after MacLean played a pivotal role in the passage of a bill that allowed PEBSCO Nationwide Retirements Investments to sell its services to local governments in Massachusetts. MacLean received $1 million in commissions from PEBSCO. In 1990, federal prosecutors convened a grand jury to look into MacLean's dealings with PEBSCO, but due to a lack of witnesses, the case was dropped in 1991.

On February 2, 1993, a Suffolk County grand jury indicted MacLean on two counts of violating a provision in the state conflict-of-interest law that prohibits state employees from having a financial interest in state contracts. According to prosecutors, MacLean received half the fees former Attorney General Edward J. McCormack Jr. made from developing, constructing, and managing Fairhaven Village, a housing development for elderly and low-income residents that received state funding, through Sky High Realty Trust, a trust whose sole beneficiary was MacLean's wife, Marjorie. McLean was also accused of receiving a portion of the money ($278,090) PEBSCO earned by selling its plan to state employees through hidden payments made through Pilgrim Insurance Agency, which was also owned by McCormack.

On February 5, MacLean pleaded guilty to both charges. He was ordered to pay the state $512,000 and serve one year of probation. MacLean had sought to plead nolo contendere, however after three judges refused to take a nolo contendere plea, he agreed to plead guilty so that the case would not be further delayed. It was the largest conflict of interest fine in state history.

State law allows the board to invalidate the pensions of state workers who are convicted of crimes "applicable" to their jobs. On September 17, 1993, the state retirement stripped MacLean of his $23,000 a year pension. MacLean appealed the revocation. In 2000, the Massachusetts Supreme Judicial Court upheld the revocation of MacLean's pension.

== Personal life and death ==
MacLean married Martha George in 1956 and they divorced in 1976. They had three children. MacLean's second wife was Marjorie McCarthy for eighteen years, until her death from cancer on June 29, 1995. On April 30, 1998, he married the daughter of Rhode Island State Senator John Moran, in Newport, Rhode Island.

He owned homes in Fairhaven, Nantucket, and Jupiter, Florida.

MacLean died on February 20, 2026, at the age of 91.

Political offices
| Preceded by Thomas W. McGee | Majority Leader of the Massachusetts House of Representatives; 1975–1978 | Succeeded by George Keverian |
| Preceded by Paul Murphy | Majority Whip of the Massachusetts House of Representatives; 1973–1975 | Succeeded by George Keverian |
