= Rudy Chmura =

American politician (1932–2023)

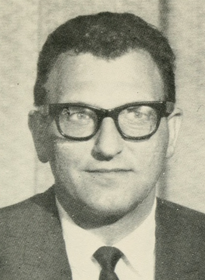
- Chmura in 1975

Member of the Massachusetts House of Representatives
- In office 1969–1982

Personal details
- Born: March 21, 1932
- Died: June 30, 2023 (aged 91)
- Party: Democratic

Rudy Chmura (March 21, 1932 – June 30, 2023) was an American politician. He served as a Democratic member of the Massachusetts House of Representatives.
