= Frank J. Matrango =

American educator and politician

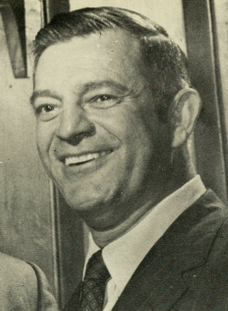
Frank J. Matrango

Frank J. Matrango (July 19, 1926 – November 1, 1996) was an American educator and politician.

Born in Springfield, Massachusetts, Matrango went to the Cathedral High School and served in the United States Navy during World War II. He then received his bachelor's degree in education from the College of the Holy Cross in 1952 and his master's degree in education from North Adams State College. Matrango was a teacher and counselor, at St. Joseph's High School, in North Adams, Massachusetts. Matrango served in the Massachusetts House of Representatives from 1969 to 1983 and was a Democrat. In 1984, Matrango moved to Hyannis, Massachusetts. He died at Cape Cod Hospital in Hyannis, Massachusetts after a brief illness.

== See also ==
- Massachusetts House of Representatives' 1st Berkshire district
