= 1985–1986 Massachusetts legislature =

174th Massachusetts General Court
| ← | 173rd | 175th | → |

Overview
- Legislative body: General Court
- Term: January 2, 1985 – January 6, 1987

Senate
- Members: 40
- President: William Bulger
- Majority Leader: Walter J. Boverini
- Majority Whip: John A. Brennan Jr.
- Minority Leader: John Francis Parker
- Minority Whip: David H. Locke
- Party control: Democrat

House
- Members: 160
- Speaker: George Keverian
- Majority Leader: W. Paul White
- Majority Whip: Robert Correia
- Minority Leader: William G. Robinson
- Minority Whip: Iris Holland
- Party control: Democrat

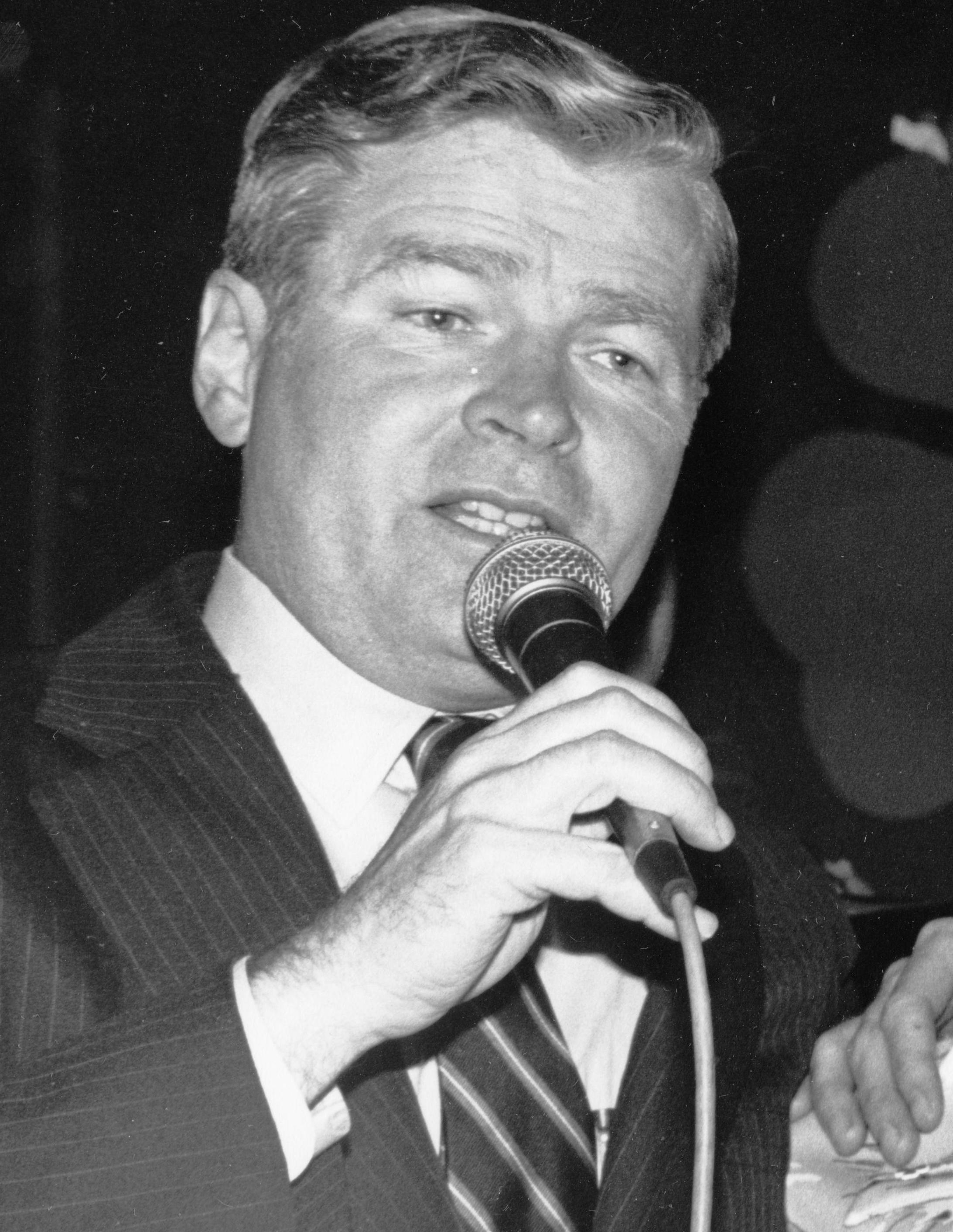
William Bulger, Senate president.

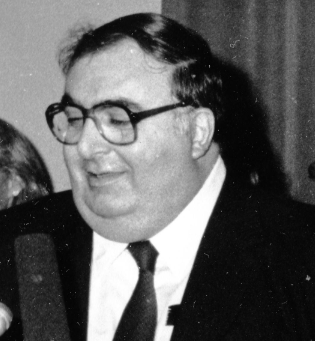
George Keverian, House speaker.

Leaders of the Massachusetts General Court, 1985-1986.

The 174th Massachusetts General Court, consisting of the Massachusetts Senate and the Massachusetts House of Representatives, met in 1985 and 1986 during the governorship of Michael Dukakis. William Bulger served as president of the Senate and George Keverian served as speaker of the House.

Notable legislation included the Safe Roads Act.

== Senators ==
| portrait | name | date of birth | district |
|---|---|---|---|
| | Salvatore R. Albano | 1935 | |
| | Carol Amick | | 5th Middlesex |
| | George Bachrach | December 2, 1951 | |
| | Jack Backman | April 26, 1922 | |
| | Frederick Berry | December 20, 1949 | |
| | Louis Peter Bertonazzi | October 9, 1933 | |
| | Royal L. Bolling | June 19, 1920 | |
| | Walter J. Boverini | June 5, 1925 | |
| | John A. Brennan Jr. | September 19, 1945 | |
| | Anna Buckley | 1924 | |
| | Robert C. Buell | April 23, 1931 | |
| | William Bulger | February 2, 1934 | |
| | John P. Burke | December 2, 1954 | |
| | Edward L. Burke | 1942 | |
| | Paul Cellucci | April 24, 1948 | |
| | Nicholas Costello | 1935 | |
| | Gerard D'Amico | July 27, 1947 | |
| | Paul Doane | March 26, 1943 | |
| | Francis D. Doris | 1931 | |
| | William B. Golden | October 9, 1948 | |
| | Paul D. Harold | September 5, 1948 | |
| | John Patrick Houston | 1955 | |
| | Bill Keating (politician) | September 6, 1952 | |
| | Edward P. Kirby | January 10, 1928 | |
| | Richard Arnold Kraus | 1937 | |
| | Arthur Joseph Lewis Jr. | September 3, 1934 | |
| | David H. Locke | August 4, 1927 | |
| | Michael LoPresti Jr. | April 30, 1947 | |
| | William Q. MacLean Jr. | November 4, 1934 | |
| | Patricia McGovern | August 2, 1941 | |
| | Linda Melconian | | |
| | Thomas C. Norton | December 11, 1934 | |
| | John Olver | September 3, 1936 | |
| | Mary L. Padula | | |
| | John Francis Parker | May 29, 1907 | |
| | Martin Thomas Reilly | September 1, 1956 | |
| | Paul J. Sheehy | November 1, 1934 | |
| | Joseph B. Walsh | November 15, 1923 | |
| | Peter Colbourne Webber | May 12, 1952 | |
| | Robert D. Wetmore | July 24, 1930 | |

== Representatives ==
| portrait | name | date of birth | district |
|---|---|---|---|
| | Theodore J. Aleixo Jr. | August 23, 1942 | 3rd Bristol |
| | Frances Alexander (politician) | June 16, 1919 | |
| | Lawrence R. Alexander | 1950 | |
| | Robert B. Ambler | 1927 | |
| | Steven Angelo | June 8, 1952 | |
| | Timothy A. Bassett | December 16, 1947 | |
| | Geoffrey C. Beckwith | 1958 | |
| | Kevin Blanchette | 1954 | |
| | Robert Joseph Bohigian | July 24, 1922 | |
| | Royal L. Bolling Jr. | May 1, 1944 | |
| | George Bourque | 1913 | |
| | John C. Bradford | February 16, 1940 | |
| | James T. Brett | December 22, 1949 | |
| | Thomas Brownell | March 25, 1940 | |
| | Carmen Buell | February 3, 1945 | |
| | Nicholas J. Buglione | 1932 | |
| | Suzanne M. Bump | February 18, 1956 | |
| | Doris Bunte | July 2, 1933 | |
| | John Businger | February 5, 1945 | |
| | Thomas Cahir | September 19, 1952 | |
| | Howard C. Cahoon Jr. | December 31, 1944 | |
| | Ellen Canavan | December 26, 1941 | |
| | William A. Carey | January 28, 1920 | |
| | Paul Caron | November 15, 1955 | |
| | Angelo R. Cataldo | November 12, 1917 | |
| | Athan Catjakis | 1931 | |
| | Robert A. Cerasoli | July 12, 1947 | |
| | Salvatore Ciccarelli | February 16, 1941 | |
| | Marjorie Clapprood | September 24, 1949 | |
| | Forrester Clark | November 30, 1934 | |
| | David B. Cohen (mayor) | September 2, 1947 | |
| | Andrew Collaro | March 21, 1910 | |
| | James G. Collins | August 2, 1946 | |
| | Joseph M. Connolly | January 5, 1924 | |
| | William Constantino Jr. | May 27, 1944 | |
| | Robert Correia | January 3, 1939 | |
| | Frank N. Costa | October 25, 1945 | |
| | John F. Cox | July 27, 1955 | |
| | Michael C. Creedon | November 3, 1946 | |
| | John F. Cusack | October 5, 1937 | |
| | Charles Decas | October 5, 1937 | |
| | Walter DeFilippi | October 3, 1926 | |
| | A. Joseph DeNucci | August 30, 1939 | |
| | Salvatore DiMasi | August 11, 1945 | |
| | William H. Donovan | January 2, 1941 | |
| | Stephen W. Doran | March 26, 1956 | |
| | Charles Robert Doyle | September 24, 1925 | |
| | John R. Driscoll | May 9, 1924 | |
| | Robert Durand | February 28, 1953 | |
| | Frank Emilio (politician) | August 31, 1935 | |
| | Patricia Fiero | June 12, 1941 | |
| | Thomas Finneran | January 2, 1950 | |
| | Kevin W. Fitzgerald | 1950 | |
| | Charles Flaherty (politician) | October 13, 1938 | |
| | Michael F. Flaherty Sr. | September 6, 1936 | |
| | John H. Flood | June 24, 1939 | |
| | William J. Flynn Jr. | 1933 | |
| | Peter Forman | April 28, 1958 | |
| | Bruce N. Freeman | March 4, 1921 | |
| | Thomas M. Gallagher | October 26, 1948 | |
| | William F. Galvin | September 17, 1950 | |
| | Mary Jane Gibson | February 7, 1933 | |
| | William Glodis | April 6, 1934 | |
| | Roberta Goldman | March 30, 1938 | |
| | Roger R. Goyette | January 22, 1925 | |
| | Saundra Graham | September 5, 1941 | |
| | Barbara Gray | October 11, 1926 | |
| | Henry Grenier | December 9, 1924 | |
| | Sherwood Guernsey | 1946 | |
| | Robert Emmet Hayes | 1951 | |
| | Jonathan Healy | October 10, 1945 | |
| | Joseph N. Hermann | June 8, 1924 | |
| | Albert Herren | June 8, 1952 | |
| | Lucile Hicks | May 11, 1938 | |
| | Barbara Hildt | April 13, 1946 | |
| | Christopher Hodgkins | August 24, 1957 | |
| | Iris Holland | September 30, 1920 | |
| | Augusta Hornblower | June 6, 1948 | |
| | Robert L. Howarth | 1942 | |
| | Marie Elizabeth Howe | June 13, 1939 | |
| | Frank Hynes | December 23, 1940 | |
| | Robert F. Jakubowicz | 1932 | |
| | Raymond A. Jordan Jr. | May 5, 1943 | |
| | Stephen Karol | 1948 | |
| | Marie-Louise Kehoe | December 12, 1928 | |
| | Thomas P. Kennedy | August 15, 1951 | |
| | George Keverian | June 3, 1931 | |
| | Paul Kollios | February 24, 1936 | |
| | Denis Lawrence | 1940 | |
| | Edward LeLacheur | June 1, 1925 | |
| | Kenneth M. Lemanski | January 27, 1954 | |
| | Jacqueline Lewis | May 3, 1945 | |
| | John Loring | 1926 | |
| | Joseph Mackey | 1951 | |
| | David P. Magnani | May 24, 1944 | |
| | Charles Mann | April 27, 1935 | |
| | M. Joseph Manning | September 23, 1924 | |
| | Francis Mara | 1950 | |
| | Angelo Marotta | October 16, 1937 | |
| | John E. McDonough | May 21, 1953 | |
| | Thomas W. McGee | May 24, 1924 | |
| | Michael J. McGlynn | April 23, 1953 | |
| | Joseph B. McIntyre | April 11, 1957 | |
| | Mary Jane McKenna | October 23, 1939 | |
| | John C. McNeil | June 8, 1945 | |
| | Joan Menard | September 6, 1935 | |
| | Jim Miceli | March 25, 1935 | |
| | Richard T. Moore | August 7, 1943 | |
| | William E. Moriarty | October 4, 1923 | |
| | Peter B. Morin | April 2, 1955 | |
| | Michael W. Morrissey | August 2, 1954 | |
| | William D. Mullins | August 13, 1931 | |
| | Mary Jeanette Murray | December 24, 1924 | |
| | Eleanor Myerson | May 9, 1922 | |
| | William P. Nagle Jr. | June 10, 1951 | |
| | Andrew Natsios | September 22, 1949 | |
| | Nicholas Paleologos | March 9, 1953 | |
| | Thomas Palumbo | June 9, 1950 | |
| | Marie Parente | May 22, 1928 | |
| | Angelo Picucci | April 12, 1915 | |
| | Steven Pierce | October 10, 1949 | |
| | Kevin Poirier | July 7, 1940 | |
| | Daniel Ranieri | 1951 | |
| | Henri S. Rauschenbach | October 9, 1947 | |
| | Michael J. Rea Jr. | July 23, 1940 | |
| | William G. Robinson | March 10, 1926 | |
| | Robert J. Rohan | August 15, 1921 | |
| | Susan Rourke | March 7, 1954 | |
| | Richard J. Rouse | March 30, 1954 | |
| | J. Michael Ruane | December 10, 1927 | |
| | Byron Rushing | July 29, 1942 | |
| | Alfred E. Saggese Jr. | November 21, 1946 | |
| | Sherman Saltmarsh | April 27, 1929 | |
| | Angelo Scaccia | September 29, 1942 | |
| | Susan Schur | February 27, 1940 | |
| | Anthony M. Scibelli | October 16, 1911 | |
| | Emanuel Serra | June 12, 1945 | |
| | Charles Silvia | February 18, 1945 | |
| | Theodore C. Speliotis | August 20, 1953 | |
| | Chester Suhoski | March 26, 1941 | |
| | Gregory W. Sullivan | January 29, 1952 | |
| | Royall H. Switzler | September 27, 1938 | |
| | Richard Tisei | August 13, 1962 | |
| | Peter G. Torkildsen | January 28, 1958 | |
| | Roger Tougas | January 9, 1927 | |
| | Marilyn Travinski | June 1, 1947 | |
| | Philip Travis | July 2, 1940 | |
| | Peter Trombley | September 16, 1948 | |
| | Susan Tucker (politician) | November 7, 1944 | |
| | Thomas J. Vallely | January 6, 1950 | |
| | Peter A. Vellucci | 1942 | |
| | William B. Vernon | April 17, 1951 | |
| | Robert A. Vigneau | November 4, 1920 | |
| | Richard Voke | December 2, 1947 | |
| | Patricia Walrath | August 11, 1941 | |
| | Michael P. Walsh | July 1, 1956 | |
| | W. Paul White | July 7, 1945 | |
| | Thomas P. White | August 27, 1950 | |
| | Francis H. Woodward | March 17, 1939 | |

== See also ==
- 99th United States Congress
- List of Massachusetts General Courts
