= 1987–1988 Massachusetts legislature =

175th Massachusetts General Court
←	174th	176th	→

Overview
- Legislative body: General Court
- Term: January 7, 1987 – November 23, 1988

Senate
- Members: 40
- President: William Bulger
- Majority Leader: Walter J. Boverini
- Majority Whip: John A. Brennan Jr.
- Minority Leader: John Francis Parker
- Minority Whip: David H. Locke
- Party control: Democrat

House
- Members: 160
- Speaker: George Keverian
- Majority Leader: Charles Flaherty
- Majority Whip: Robert Correia
- Minority Leader: Steven Pierce
- Minority Whip: Lucile Hicks
- Party control: Democrat

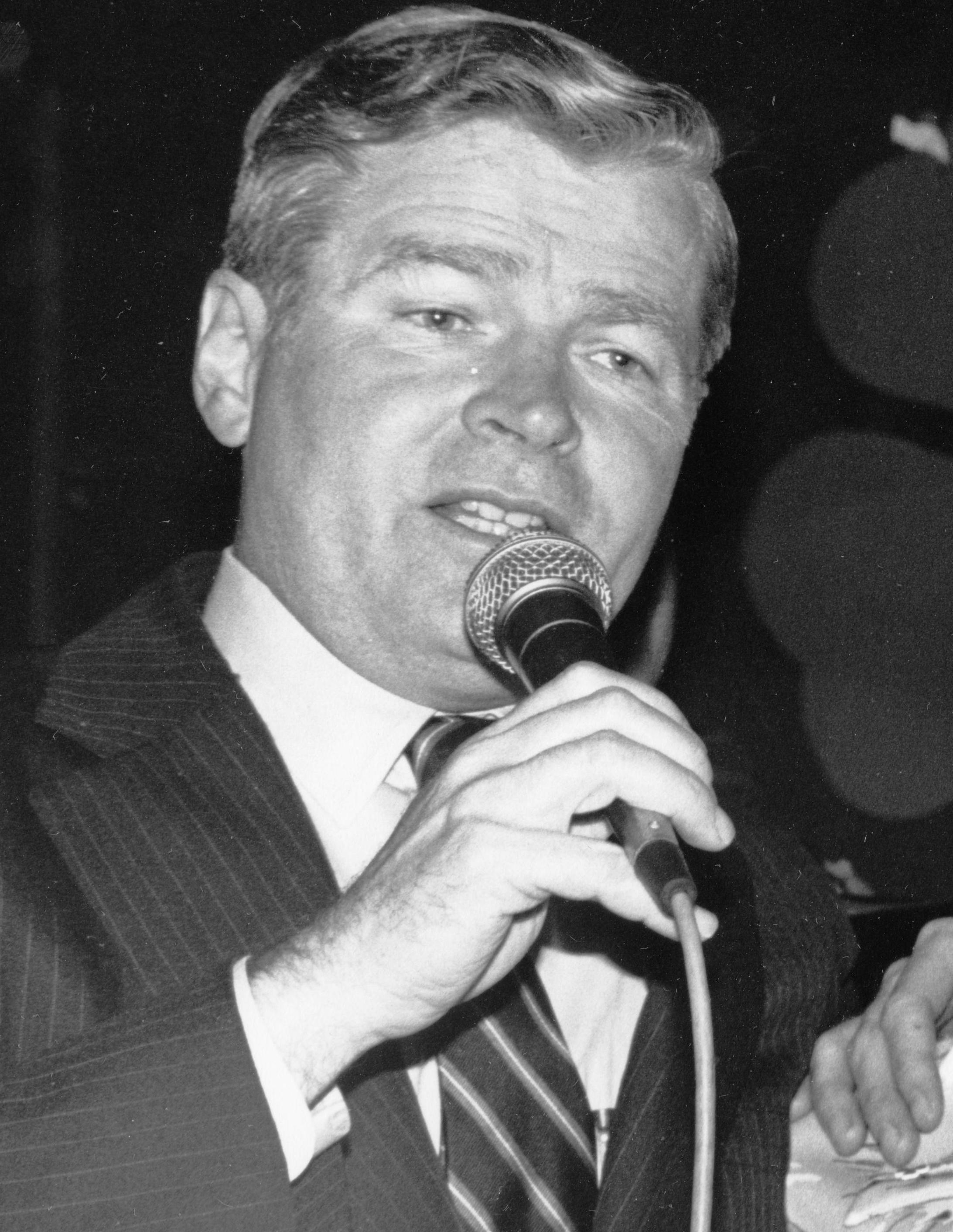
William Bulger, Senate president.

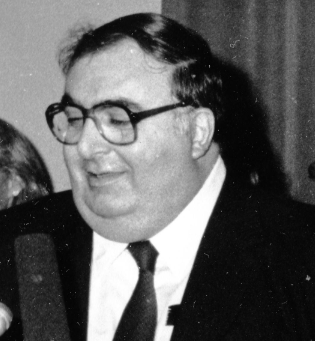
George Keverian, House speaker.

Leaders of the Massachusetts General Court, 1987-1988.

The 175th Massachusetts General Court, consisting of the Massachusetts Senate and the Massachusetts House of Representatives, met in 1987 and 1988 during the governorship of Michael Dukakis. William Bulger served as president of the Senate and George Keverian served as speaker of the House.

Notable legislation included creation of the Massachusetts Environmental Trust.

== Senators ==
portrait	name	date of birth	district
	Salvatore R. Albano	1935	
	Carol Amick		5th Middlesex
	Michael J. Barrett	June 27, 1948	
	Frederick Berry	December 20, 1949	
	Louis Peter Bertonazzi	October 9, 1933	
	Royal L. Bolling	June 19, 1920	
	Walter J. Boverini	June 5, 1925	
	John A. Brennan Jr.	September 19, 1945	
	Anna Buckley	1924	
	Robert C. Buell	April 23, 1931	
	William Bulger	February 2, 1934	
	John P. Burke	December 2, 1954	
	Edward L. Burke	1942	
	Paul Cellucci	April 24, 1948	
	Nicholas Costello	1935	
	Paul Doane	March 26, 1943	
	Francis D. Doris	1931	
	William B. Golden	October 9, 1948	
	Paul D. Harold	September 5, 1948	
	John Patrick Houston	1955	
	Bill Keating (politician)	September 6, 1952	
	Edward P. Kirby	January 10, 1928	
	Richard Arnold Kraus	1937	
	Arthur Joseph Lewis Jr.	September 3, 1934	
	David H. Locke	August 4, 1927	
	Michael LoPresti Jr.	April 30, 1947	
	William Q. MacLean Jr.	November 4, 1934	
	Patricia McGovern	August 2, 1941	
	Linda Melconian		
	Thomas C. Norton	December 11, 1934	
	John Olver	September 3, 1936	
	Mary L. Padula		
	John Francis Parker	May 29, 1907	
	Lois Pines	August 16, 1940	
	Martin Thomas Reilly	September 1, 1956	
	Paul J. Sheehy	November 1, 1934	
	Joseph B. Walsh	November 15, 1923	
	Peter Colbourne Webber	May 12, 1952	
	Robert D. Wetmore	July 24, 1930	
	Thomas P. White	August 27, 1950	

== Representatives ==
portrait	name	date of birth	district
	Theodore J. Aleixo Jr.	August 23, 1942	3rd Bristol
	Frances Alexander (politician)	June 16, 1919	
	Lawrence R. Alexander	1950	
	Robert B. Ambler	1927	
	Steven Angelo	June 8, 1952	
	John C. Bartley	March 25, 1956	
	Geoffrey C. Beckwith	1958	
	John Binienda	June 22, 1947	
	Kevin Blanchette	1954	
	Peter I. Blute	January 28, 1956	
	Robert Joseph Bohigian	July 24, 1922	
	Daniel E. Bosley	December 9, 1953	
	George Bourque	1913	
	John C. Bradford	February 16, 1940	
	James T. Brett	December 22, 1949	
	Thomas Brownell	March 25, 1940	
	Carmen Buell	February 3, 1945	
	Suzanne M. Bump	February 18, 1956	
	John Businger	February 5, 1945	
	Thomas Cahir	September 19, 1952	
	Howard C. Cahoon Jr.	December 31, 1944	
	Ellen Canavan	December 26, 1941	
	Paul Caron	November 15, 1955	
	Athan Catjakis	1931	
	Robert A. Cerasoli	July 12, 1947	
	Marjorie Clapprood	September 24, 1949	
	Forrester Clark	November 30, 1934	
	Carol Cleven	November 2, 1928	
	David B. Cohen (mayor)	September 2, 1947	
	Andrew Collaro	March 21, 1910	
	Joseph M. Connolly	January 5, 1924	
	William Constantino Jr.	May 27, 1944	
	Robert Correia	January 3, 1939	
	John F. Cox	July 27, 1955	
	Michael C. Creedon	November 3, 1946	
	Charles Decas	October 5, 1937	
	Walter DeFilippi	October 3, 1926	
	Salvatore DiMasi	August 11, 1945	
	Stephen W. Doran	March 26, 1956	
	Charles Robert Doyle	September 24, 1925	
	John R. Driscoll	May 9, 1924	
	Robert Durand	February 28, 1953	
	Frank Emilio (politician)	August 31, 1935	
	Patricia Fiero	June 12, 1941	
	Thomas Finneran	January 2, 1950	
	Kevin W. Fitzgerald	1950	
	Charles Flaherty (politician)	October 13, 1938	
	Michael F. Flaherty Sr.	September 6, 1936	
	John H. Flood	June 24, 1939	
	William J. Flynn Jr.	1933	
	Peter Forman	April 28, 1958	
	Gloria Fox	March 18, 1942	
	William F. Galvin	September 17, 1950	
	Barbara Gardner	January 19, 1941	
	Mary Jane Gibson	February 7, 1933	
	Larry F. Giordano	1944	
	William Glodis	April 6, 1934	
	Augusto Grace	April 9, 1954	
	Saundra Graham	September 5, 1941	
	Barbara Gray	October 11, 1926	
	Henry Grenier	December 9, 1924	
	Sherwood Guernsey	1946	
	Robert Havern III	July 17, 1949	
	Robert Emmet Hayes	1951	
	Jonathan Healy	October 10, 1945	
	Joseph N. Hermann	June 8, 1924	
	Albert Herren	June 8, 1952	
	Lucile Hicks	May 11, 1938	
	Shirley Owens Hicks	April 22, 1942	
	Barbara Hildt	April 13, 1946	
	Christopher Hodgkins	August 24, 1957	
	Iris Holland	September 30, 1920	
	Kevin Honan	June 5, 1958	
	Augusta Hornblower	June 6, 1948	
	Robert L. Howarth	1942	
	Marie Elizabeth Howe	June 13, 1939	
	Frank Hynes	December 23, 1940	
	Robert F. Jakubowicz	1932	
	Raymond A. Jordan Jr.	May 5, 1943	
	Stephen Karol	1948	
	Marie-Louise Kehoe	December 12, 1928	
	Thomas P. Kennedy	August 15, 1951	
	George Keverian	June 3, 1931	
	Paul Kollios	February 24, 1936	
	Patrick Landers	September 20, 1959	
	Denis Lawrence	1940	
	Edward LeLacheur	June 1, 1925	
	Kenneth M. Lemanski	January 27, 1954	
	Jacqueline Lewis	May 3, 1945	
	John Loring	1926	
	Vincent Lozzi	January 28, 1932	
	John MacGovern	July 14, 1951	
	Joseph Mackey	1951	
	David P. Magnani	May 24, 1944	
	Anthony Mandile	August 14, 1946	
	Charles Mann	April 27, 1935	
	M. Joseph Manning	September 23, 1924	
	Francis Mara	1950	
	Angelo Marotta	October 16, 1937	
	Robert H. Marsh	August 15, 1959	
	John E. McDonough	May 21, 1953	
	Thomas W. McGee	May 24, 1924	
	Michael J. McGlynn	April 23, 1953	
	Joseph B. McIntyre	April 11, 1957	
	Mary Jane McKenna	October 23, 1939	
	John C. McNeil	June 8, 1945	
	Joan Menard	September 6, 1935	
	Jim Miceli	March 25, 1935	
	Richard T. Moore	August 7, 1943	
	William E. Moriarty	October 4, 1923	
	Peter B. Morin	April 2, 1955	
	Michael W. Morrissey	August 2, 1954	
	Mary Jeanette Murray	December 24, 1924	
	Eleanor Myerson	May 9, 1922	
	William P. Nagle Jr.	June 10, 1951	
	Shannon O%27Brien	April 30, 1959	
	Timothy F. O'Leary	1944	
	Kevin O'Sullivan (politician)	September 30, 1953	
	Nicholas Paleologos	March 9, 1953	
	Thomas Palumbo	June 9, 1950	
	Marie Parente	May 22, 1928	
	Thomas Petrolati	March 16, 1957	
	Angelo Picucci	April 12, 1915	
	Steven Pierce	October 10, 1949	
	Kevin Poirier	July 7, 1940	
	Daniel Ranieri	1951	
	Henri S. Rauschenbach	October 9, 1947	
	Michael J. Rea Jr.	July 23, 1940	
	William Reinstein	March 26, 1929	
	Robert J. Rohan	August 15, 1921	
	Mark Roosevelt	December 10, 1955	
	Stan Rosenberg	October 12, 1949	
	Susan Rourke	March 7, 1954	
	Richard J. Rouse	March 30, 1954	
	J. Michael Ruane	December 10, 1927	
	Byron Rushing	July 29, 1942	
	Alfred E. Saggese Jr.	November 21, 1946	
	Sherman Saltmarsh	April 27, 1929	
	Angelo Scaccia	September 29, 1942	
	Susan Schur	February 27, 1940	
	Anthony M. Scibelli	October 16, 1911	
	Emanuel Serra	June 12, 1945	
	Charles Silvia	February 18, 1945	
	Chester Suhoski	March 26, 1941	
	Gregory W. Sullivan	January 29, 1952	
	Richard Tisei	August 13, 1962	
	Peter G. Torkildsen	January 28, 1958	
	Roger Tougas	January 9, 1927	
	Barry Trahan	December 27, 1954	
	Marilyn Travinski	June 1, 1947	
	Philip Travis	July 2, 1940	
	Peter Trombley	September 16, 1948	
	Susan Tucker (politician)	November 7, 1944	
	Peter A. Vellucci	1942	
	William B. Vernon	April 17, 1951	
	Richard Voke	December 2, 1947	
	Patricia Walrath	August 11, 1941	
	Michael P. Walsh		
	Thomas Walsh (Massachusetts politician)	July 15, 1960	
	W. Paul White	July 7, 1945	
	Francis H. Woodward	March 17, 1939	

== See also ==
- 100th United States Congress
- List of Massachusetts General Courts
