= Marilyn Travinski =

American politician

Marilyn Travinsky
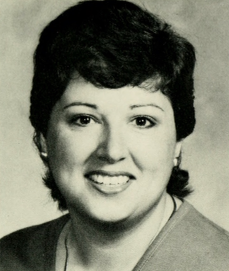

Member of the Massachusetts House of Representatives from the 6th Worcester district
- In office 1983–1991

Marilyn Travinsky is an American Democratic politician from Southbridge, Massachusetts. She represented the 6th Worcester district in the Massachusetts House of Representatives from 1983 to 1991, where she served as the first female chair of its Commerce and Labor Committee.

Travinsky received her bachelor's degree at Albertus Magnus College and her master's at Wesleyan University. After politics, she led Tri-Valley Inc. for 25 years as its CEO.

== See also ==
- 1983-1984 Massachusetts legislature
- 1985-1986 Massachusetts legislature
- 1987-1988 Massachusetts legislature
- 1989-1990 Massachusetts legislature
