= Ellen M. Canavan =

American politician

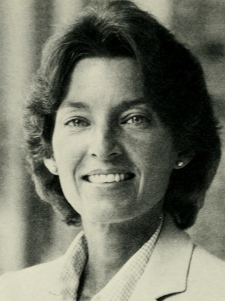

Member of the Massachusetts House of Representatives from the 13th Norfolk district
- In office 1981–1988

Personal details
- Born: December 26, 1941 San Antonio, Texas
- Died: July 4, 2023 (aged 81)
- Education: Regis College (BA); Boston College (MEd); Harvard University (MPA)

Ellen M. Canavan (December 26, 1941 – July 4, 2023) was an American Republican politician from Needham, Massachusetts. She represented the 13th Norfolk district in the Massachusetts House of Representatives from 1981 to 1988.

Canavan died on July 4, 2023, at the age of 81.

== See also ==
- 1981-1982 Massachusetts legislature
- 1983-1984 Massachusetts legislature
- 1985-1986 Massachusetts legislature
- 1987-1988 Massachusetts legislature
