= Mary Jane McKenna =

American politician

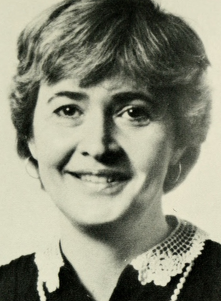

Member of the Massachusetts House of Representatives
- In office 1985–1993

Mary Jane McKenna is an American Republican politician from Holden, Massachusetts. She represented the 1st Worcester district in the Massachusetts House of Representatives from 1985 to 1993.

== See also ==
- 1985-1986 Massachusetts legislature
- 1987-1988 Massachusetts legislature
- 1989-1990 Massachusetts legislature
- 1991-1992 Massachusetts legislature
