= William Constantino =

William Constantino may refer to:

- William P. Constantino (1911–1989), American judge and member of the Massachusetts House of Representatives
- William Constantino Jr. (born 1944), American lawyer and member of the Massachusetts House of Representatives
