= Vellucci =

Vellucci is a surname. Notable people with the surname include:

- Alfred Vellucci (1915–2002), American politician
- Mike Vellucci (born 1966), American ice hockey player and coach
- Peter A. Vellucci (1942/43–2014), American politician
