= David B. Cohen (mayor) =

American politician

David Barry Cohen
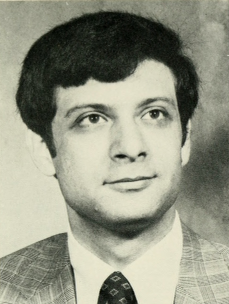
- Official portrait, circa 1983

Mayor of Newton, Massachusetts
- In office January 1, 1998 – December 31, 2009
- Preceded by: Thomas Concannon Jr.
- Succeeded by: Setti Warren

Member of the Massachusetts House of Representatives
- In office 1979–1998

Member of the Newton Board of Alderman
- In office 1972–1979

Personal details
- Born: September 2, 1947 (age 79) Boston, Massachusetts
- Party: Democratic
- Education: Harvard College; Boston University Law School

David Barry Cohen (born September 2, 1947) is an American politician who served as a Massachusetts state Representative for the 11th Middlesex district and as the mayor of Newton, Massachusetts.

Cohen was a member of the Newton Board of Aldermen from 1972–1979 and a state representative from 1979–1998. In 1997, Cohen defeated incumbent Mayor Thomas Concannon Jr. to win his first of three terms as mayor.

Based on statistics reported to the Federal Bureau of Investigation, Newton under Mayor Cohen's leadership was the nation's safest city during 2003, 2004 and 2005, and the fourth-safest city in the nation in 2006. The designation is based on crime statistics in six categories: murder, rape, robbery, aggravated assault, burglary, and auto theft. Cohen did not run for re-election in 2009.

== Later career ==
Cohen decided not to run for another term in 2009 and left office on Jan. 1, 2010, replaced by political newcomer Setti Warren, who won a close race against State Representative Ruth Balser.

Cohen's final term ended with controversy over the city's new Newton North High School. With a price tag of nearly $200 million, the school is the most expensive in Massachusetts. He said he chose not to run for a fourth term because he did not want to harm efforts to override Proposition 2½.

== Personal life ==
He is Jewish.

== See also ==
- 1979–1980 Massachusetts legislature
- 1981–1982 Massachusetts legislature
- 1983–1984 Massachusetts legislature
- 1985–1986 Massachusetts legislature
- 1987–1988 Massachusetts legislature
- 1989–1990 Massachusetts legislature
- 1991–1992 Massachusetts legislature
- 1993–1994 Massachusetts legislature
- 1995–1996 Massachusetts legislature
