= Augusta Hornblower =

American politician

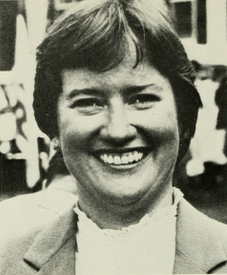

Member of the Massachusetts House of Representatives from the First Middlesex district
- In office 1984–1994
- Preceded by: Bruce Weatherbee
- Succeeded by: Robert Hargraves

Augusta Hornblower (June 6, 1948 - August 27, 1994) was an American Republican politician from Groton, Massachusetts. She represented the First Middlesex district in the Massachusetts House of Representatives from 1984 until her death in 1994.

She was the daughter of Henry Hornblower, II, an investment banker and founder of the living history museum Plimoth Plantation, now called Plimoth Patuxet, and his wife Dorothy Shapard. Her great grandfather, Henry Hornblower was the co-founder of the Hornblower & Weeks investment bank and brokerage.

She was elected to the Republican National Committee in 1988 and was appointed assistant minority whip in the legislature in 1993.

She died in 1994 of recurrent bone cancer.

== See also ==
- 1985-1986 Massachusetts legislature
- 1987-1988 Massachusetts legislature
- 1989-1990 Massachusetts legislature
- 1991-1992 Massachusetts legislature
- 1993-1994 Massachusetts legislature
