= Setti Warren =

American politician and academic (1970–2025)

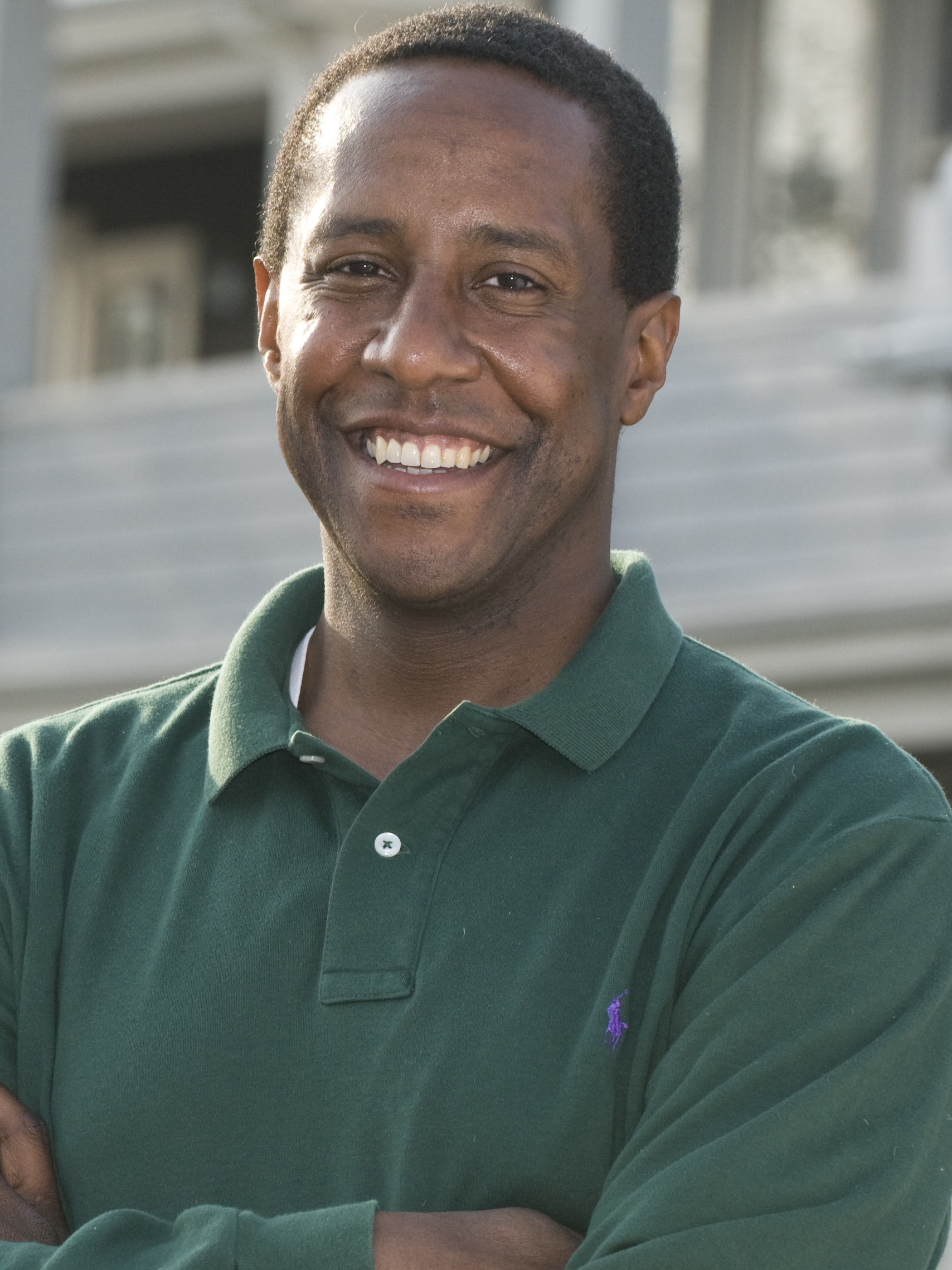
- Warren in 2011

Mayor of Newton
- In office January 1, 2010 – January 1, 2018
- Preceded by: David Cohen
- Succeeded by: Ruthanne Fuller

Personal details
- Born: Setti David Warren; August 25, 1970 Newton, Massachusetts, U.S.
- Died: November 2, 2025 (aged 55) Newton, Massachusetts, U.S.
- Party: Democratic
- Spouse: Tassy Plummer (m. 2007)
- Children: 2
- Education: Boston College (BA); Suffolk University (JD)
- Website: Campaign website

Setti David Warren (August 25, 1970 – November 2, 2025) was an American politician. He served as mayor of Newton, Massachusetts, a suburb of Boston, and was a Democratic candidate for United States Senate in 2012.

Warren ran for Governor of Massachusetts in the 2018 election, but later withdrew from the race, citing fundraising and financial issues.

== Early life and education ==
Warren was born on August 25, 1970, alongside his twin sister, Makeda, to Joseph and Elpidia (née Lopez) Warren. His father, Joseph D. Warren, was an advisor for Massachusetts Governor Michael Dukakis's 1988 presidential campaign, and worked in the African-American studies department at Northeastern University before his death in 2025. His mother, Elpidia Lopez, was a retired social worker. He also had a stepmother, Martha L. (Walker) Warren. His younger sister Kara, who had struggled with severe asthma throughout her life, died in November 2005, aged 27.

He completed elementary education at the private school Jackson Walnut Park in Newton and then attended Newton North High School, where he was elected president for all four years. He attended Boston College, where he was also elected Undergraduate Student Government president. He graduated with a Bachelor of Arts in history in 1993. He received a Juris Doctor from Suffolk University Law School's night classes in 2006, although he never took the bar exam in order to practice law.

== Early career and Navy service ==
After graduating from college, Warren worked for two years with his family's consulting business. In 1995, he joined the New England branch of U.S. President Bill Clinton's re-election campaign. From 1996 to 2000, he worked in several White House Offices under Clinton: the Advance Office, Cabinet Affairs Office, and the Social Office. He served as New England regional director of the Federal Emergency Management Agency (FEMA) from 2000 to 2001, and then worked for two years in fundraising at Boston College.

Warren enlisted in the United States Naval Reserve in 2003. Around the same time, he joined the presidential campaign of U.S. Senator John Kerry, and worked as his trip director. After the election, Warren became deputy director of Kerry's Massachusetts office. Around this time, he served partial terms on the Newton Community Preservation Committee and Economic Development Commission..

In October 2007, Warren left Kerry's office to serve as Naval intelligence specialist in Iraq. Before leaving, he assembled a committee to explore his candidacy for mayor of Newton. During his training in South Carolina in late 2007, his committee filed papers for his election.

== Mayor of Newton ==
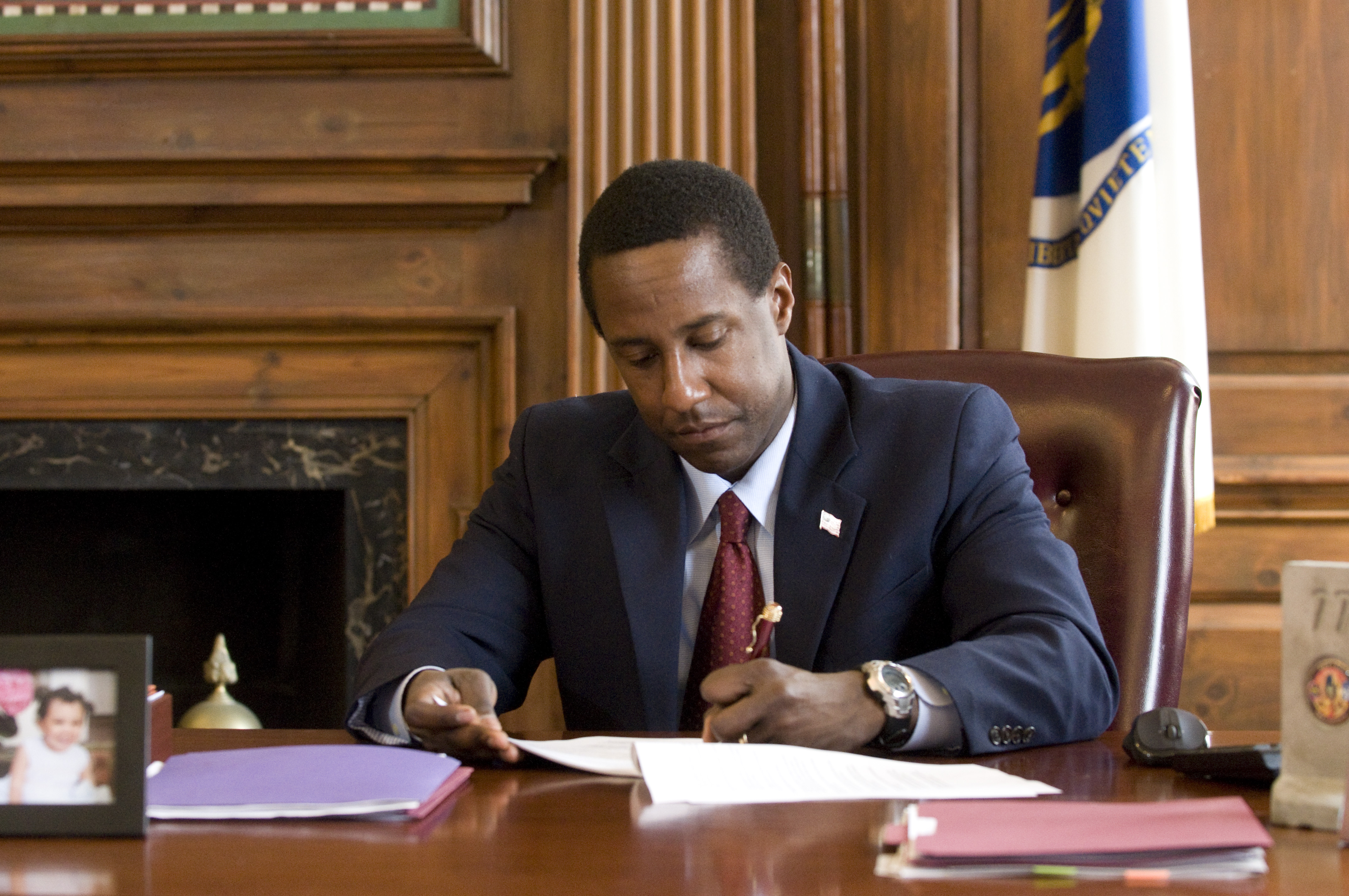
Warren at his desk in April 2011

In May 2008, Newton Mayor David Cohen announced that he would not seek re-election, leaving an open field, which had not occurred in Newton since 1971. Warren, on leave from Iraq in June 2008, declared his intent to run. His campaign was forestalled until he completed his tour of duty the following October, as Department of Defense regulations forbid active duty service men from seeking elected office. In November 2008, Warren formally announced his candidacy, pledging to "protect the sacred trust between the citizens in this city and public servants."

During the campaign Warren emphasized his record with FEMA, including the management of civil servants. Warren was elected November 3, 2009, in a vote of 11,233 to 10,772. He was the first black person to serve as mayor of Newton. This election was the first time in U.S. history that an African-American had been elected mayor in a popular election under an African-American governor (Deval Patrick) under an African American president (Barack Obama).

Warren faced re-election on November 5, 2013. The field of four candidates was narrowed down to two in a primary election on September 17, 2013. In the general election, Warren defeated Newton Alderman Ted Hess-Mahan.

In June 2013, Warren announced that he would block funding for a controversial proposal to construct affordable housing on Beacon Street in Waban for formerly homeless people. The proposal, called Engine 6, was privately developed and expected to cost $3.1 million; developers had requested about $1.4 million in federal funds managed by the city of Newton to move ahead, but Warren's withdrawal of funding halted future plans for construction.

Warren served his full second term through 2018. On November 10, 2016, he announced he would not seek a third term as mayor.

== 2012 U.S. Senate campaign ==
On May 9, 2011, Warren announced his candidacy to represent Massachusetts in the United States Senate in the 2012 election. On September 29, 2011, he dropped out of the race, declaring "I no longer believe I have a clear path to victory in this race". He endorsed eventual Democratic nominee, Elizabeth Warren. He later expressed regret at running for Senate just two years into his mayoral term, saying "I ran too early."

== 2018 Massachusetts gubernatorial campaign ==
On May 20, 2017, Warren announced he was running for Governor of Massachusetts. In front of his home and surrounded by family, friends, and supporters, Warren called income inequality the "defining issue of our generation." He called for single-payer healthcare, free tuition, a new millionaire's tax, and a high-speed rail project across Massachusetts.

Warren ended his campaign on April 26, 2018, stating "We took a hard look at the numbers and what it would take to run a winning campaign against the incumbent governor. I just saw the challenge was insurmountable, based on the ability to raise the money and the resources." He declined to endorse either of his former opponents for the Democratic nomination.

== After politics ==
After leaving politics, Warren headed the Shorenstein Center on Media, Politics and Public Policy from 2018 to 2022. Afterward, he served as the director of Harvard University's Institute of Politics, a position he was hired for in 2022.

== Personal life ==
Warren married Elizabeth Tasker "Tassy" Plummer on August 12, 2006, with John Kerry serving as his groomsman. A Newton native, Tassy worked on the Kerry presidential campaign, where she met Warren. As of 2017, Tassy is chief programs officer at the Harvard University Center on the Developing Child. Together they had one daughter named Abigail and a son named John. Warren was Catholic.

=== Death ===
Warren died suddenly at his home in Newton on November 2, 2025, at the age of 55. His death was announced in a message from Harvard Kennedy School Dean Jeremy M. Weinstein and Harvard College Dean David J. Deming. City of Newton Mayor Ruthanne Fuller composed an announcement of the former Mayor's death that was sent to Newton residents via email. Calling hours were held in the War Memorial of Newton City Hall on Thursday, Nov. 6. A funeral service was held Friday, Nov. 7, at Our Lady Help of Christians Church, in Nonantum, a village of Newton.

== Legacy ==
In January 2026, Harvard University's Institute of Politics and the City of Newton jointly announced the Setti Warren Memorial Internship, an IOP-funded program that places a Harvard undergraduate student with Newton’s Arts and Culture and Economic Development departments to support the city’s “Building a Creative Economy” initiative.
