= Sherwood Guernsey =

American politician (born 1946)

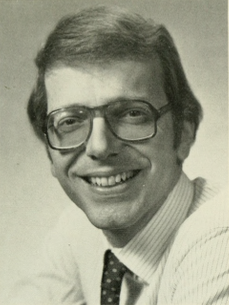
- Gurnsey in 1987

Member of the Massachusetts House of Representatives from the 2nd Berkshire district
- In office 1983–1990
- Preceded by: Anthony P. McBride
- Succeeded by: Shaun P. Kelly

Personal details
- Born: Sherwood Guernsey II; August 30, 1946 (age 80) Albany, New York, US
- Party: Massachusetts Democratic Party
- Spouse: Carol Guernsey
- Education: Dartmouth College (1968); Antioch School of Law (1975)
- Occupation: Politician attorney
- Website: sglawoffice.com

Sherwood Guernsey II (born August 30, 1946) is an American attorney and politician who served four consecutive terms representing the Massachusetts House of Representatives' 2nd Berkshire district in the Massachusetts House of Representatives between 1983 and 1990.

== Early life ==
Guernsey was born in Albany, New York on August 30, 1946. He graduated from Dartmouth College in 1968, then worked for the Peace Corps in rural Panama. After returning to the United States, he attended then graduated the Antioch School of Law in 1975. He has a wife named Carol.

== Politics ==
Guernsey was first elected in the 1983–1984 Massachusetts legislature, representing the Massachusetts House of Representatives' 2nd Berkshire district. He won 56.6% of the vote against David K. Chivers.

Guernsey represented the same district in the 1985–1986 Massachusetts legislature, winning in an uncontested election.

He won his district in the 1987–1988 Massachusetts legislature, with 71.6% of the vote against Kathryn C. Manuel.

Guernsey won his district in the 1989–1990 Massachusetts legislature, with 78.6% of the vote against John C. Drew.

In 1991, Guernsey attempted to run for Massachusetts Senate, but lost to Jane Swift, who won 52% of the vote.

Guernsey ran for Congress in the First Congressional District of Massachusetts in 1991. In connection with that campaign he sought an advisory opinion from the Federal Elections Commission before borrowing funds from his home or bank account, both of which were jointly owned with his spouse, who approved of these transactions. The FEC gave their approval to both transactions. He later lost the election to Jane Swift.

During a fundraiser for the 2016 United States presidential election in Holyoke, Massachusetts, Guernsey showed support for Hillary Clinton and criticized the media for their portrayal of Clinton.
