= Barry Trahan =

American politician

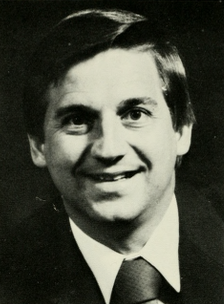

Member of the Massachusetts House of Representatives from the 11th Bristol District
- In office 1987–1989
- Preceded by: Roger Goyette
- Succeeded by: Robert Koczera

Personal details
- Born: December 27, 1954 (age 71) North Attleborough, Massachusetts
- Party: Independent; Democrat
- Education: University of Massachusetts
- Occupation: Relator; Politician

Barry G. Trahan (born December 27, 1954, in North Attleborough, Massachusetts) is an American realtor and politician who served one term in the Massachusetts House of Representatives as the Representative of the 11th Bristol district.

Trahan was elected in 1986 as a sticker candidate; defeating five-term incumbent Roger Goyette. Trahan served in the House as a Democrat and in 1988 sought the Democratic nomination. Trahan was defeated in the Democratic primary by New Bedford City Councilor Robert Koczera and was unable to win re-election via a second sticker campaign.
