= Robert Koczera =

American politician

Bob Koczera
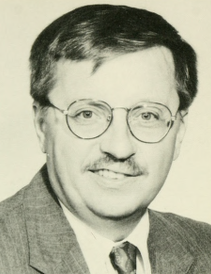
- Portrait of Robert Koczera

Member of the Massachusetts House of Representatives from the 11th Bristol district
- In office 1989–2019
- Preceded by: Barry Trahan
- Succeeded by: Christopher Hendricks

Personal details
- Born: November 25, 1953 (age 72) New Bedford, Massachusetts, U.S.
- Party: Democratic
- Education: Southeastern Massachusetts University; Suffolk University; Providence College
- Occupation: Politician

Robert M. Koczera (born November 25, 1953, New Bedford, Massachusetts) is the former member of the Massachusetts House of Representatives for the 11th Bristol district and a former member of the New Bedford City Council (1984–1989)
