= Kevin Blanchette =

Massachusetts politician (born 1954)

Member of the Massachusetts House of Representatives from the 16th Essex district
- In office 1981–1994

Personal details
- Born: August 29, 1954 (age 72) Methuen, Massachusetts, US
- Education: Villanova University; Harvard Kennedy School

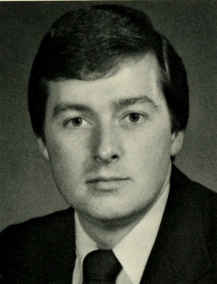
Portrait of Kevin Blanchette, member of the Massachusetts House of Representatives

Kevin Blanchette (born August 29, 1954) was an American politician who was the member of the Massachusetts House of Representatives from the 16th Essex district.
