= Massachusetts House of Representatives' 1st Worcester district =

American legislative district

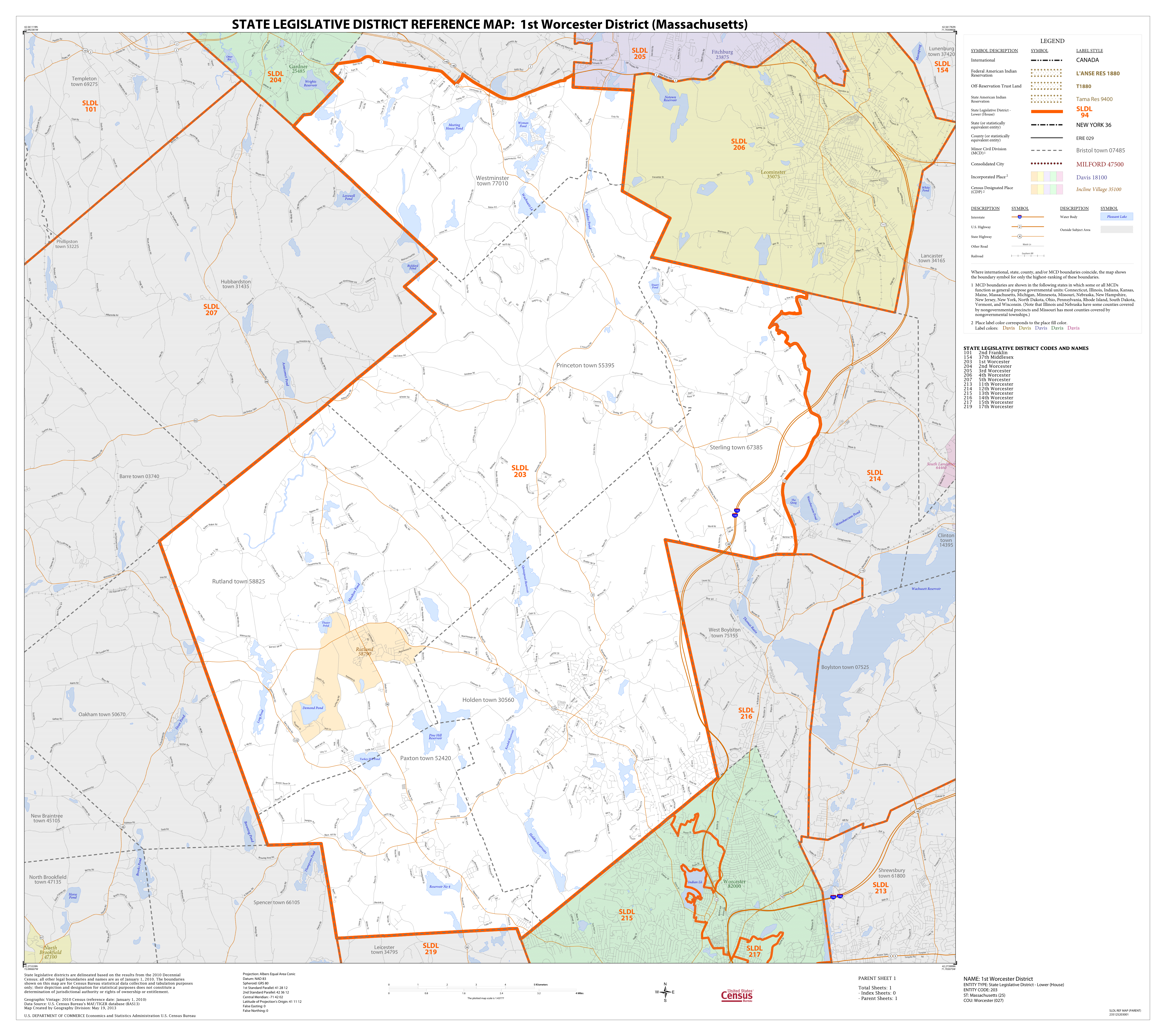
Map of Massachusetts House of Representatives' 1st Worcester district, based on the 2010 United States census.

Massachusetts House of Representatives' 1st Worcester district in the United States is one of 160 legislative districts included in the lower house of the Massachusetts General Court. It covers part of Worcester County. Republican Kimberly Ferguson of Holden has represented the district since 2011.

== Towns represented ==
The district includes the following localities:

- Holden
- Paxton
- Princeton
- Rutland
- Sterling
- Westminster

The current district geographic boundary overlaps with those of the Massachusetts Senate's 1st Worcester district, Worcester and Middlesex district, and Worcester, Hampden, Hampshire and Middlesex district.

=== Former locales ===
The district previously covered:

- Ashburnham, c. 1872
- Winchendon, c. 1872

== Representatives ==
- Jacob B. Harris, c. 1858
- J. D. Crosby, c. 1859
- Sidney P. Smith, c. 1888
- James Oliver, c. 1908
- William Lord, c. 1918
- Almond Smith, c. 1920
- Charles Cooke, c. 1935
- Samuel Joseph Boudreau, c. 1951
- H. Thomas Colo, c. 1975
- Mary Jane McKenna, c. 1983
- Harold Lane, c. 1995
- Lewis G. Evangelidis
- Kimberly N. Ferguson, 2011–present

== See also ==
- List of Massachusetts House of Representatives elections
- Other Worcester County districts of the Massachusetts House of Representatives: 2nd, 3rd, 4th, 5th, 6th, 7th, 8th, 9th, 10th, 11th, 12th, 13th, 14th, 15th, 16th, 17th, 18th
- Worcester County districts of the Massachusett Senate: 1st, 2nd; Hampshire, Franklin and Worcester; Middlesex and Worcester; Worcester, Hampden, Hampshire and Middlesex; Worcester and Middlesex; Worcester and Norfolk
- List of Massachusetts General Courts
- List of former districts of the Massachusetts House of Representatives

== Images ==
Portraits of legislators

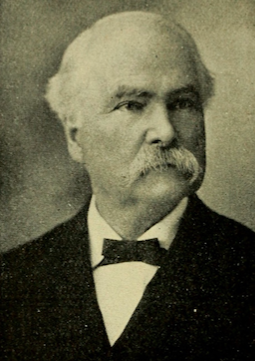
James Oliver

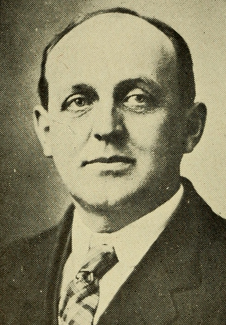
William Lord

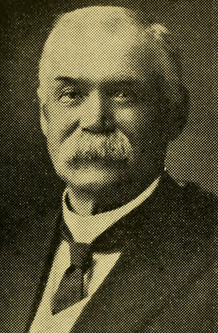
Almond Smith

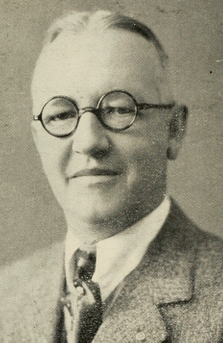
Charles Cooke

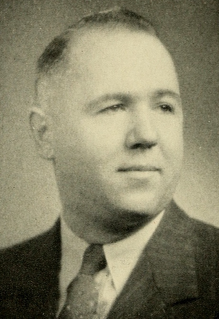
Samuel Joseph Boudreau

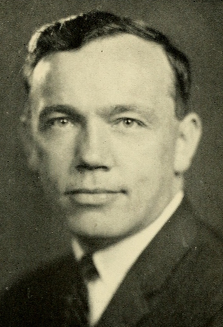
H. Thomas Colo

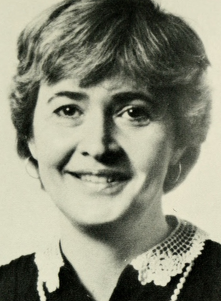
Mary Jane McKenna

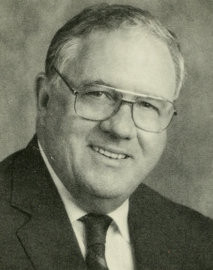
Harold Lane

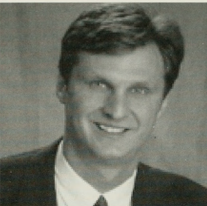
Lewis Evangelidis
