= Elizabeth Metayer =

American politician

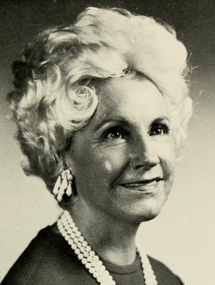

Member of the Massachusetts House of Representatives
- In office 1975–1985
- Preceded by: Maurice Ronayne
- Succeeded by: Suzanne M. Bump
- Constituency: 7th Norfolk district (1975–79); 5th Norfolk district (1979–85)

Personal details
- Born: August 12, 1911 Boston, Massachusetts
- Died: June 7, 1998 (aged 86) Fort Lauderdale, Florida
- Party: Democratic
- Education: Hickox Secretarial School; Harvard University
- Occupation: Politician

Elizabeth Metayer (August 12, 1911 – June 7, 1998) was an American homemaker turned politician who was a member of the Massachusetts House of Representatives from 1975–1985.

== See also ==
- 169th Massachusetts General Court

Massachusetts House of Representatives
Preceded by Maurice Ronayne	Member of the Massachusetts House of Representatives from the 7th Norfolk district 1975–1979	Succeeded by M. Joseph Manning
Preceded by Mark Fitzsimmons	Member of the Massachusetts House of Representatives from the 5th Norfolk district 1979–1985	Succeeded by Suzanne M. Bump
