= William P. Constantino =

American politician

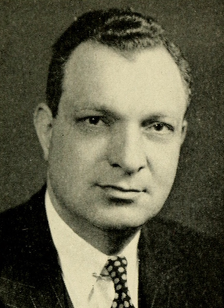

Member of the Massachusetts House of Representatives from the 11th Worcester District
- In office 1951–1954

Personal details
- Born: August 19, 1911 Clinton, Massachusetts
- Died: July 29, 1989 (aged 77) Marlborough, Massachusetts
- Party: Republican
- Education: Harvard College; Harvard Law School

William Paul Constantino Sr. (August 19, 1911 – July 29, 1989) was an American state legislator who was a justice of Clinton District Court and a member of the Massachusetts House of Representatives.

== Personal life ==
Constantino was born on August 19, 1911, in Clinton, Massachusetts. He graduated from Clinton High School in 1928, Harvard College in 1932, and Harvard Law School in 1935. His son, William P. Constantino Jr., also served in the Massachusetts House. His grandson, Mike Bonin, was elected to the Los Angeles City Council in 2014.

== Political career ==
From 1936 to 1939, Constantino was Clinton's town solicitor. In 1938 he was an unsuccessful candidate for Republican nomination for the United States House of Representatives seat in Massachusetts's 3rd congressional district.

Constantino was a member of the United States Army during World War II. He served in Europe, Africa, and the Middle East. He started as an enlisted man in anti-aircraft and rose to second lieutenant in the 78th Infantry Division. He was a member of the 78th during the Battle of the Bulge. His final assignment was as a first lieutenant in military government.

From 1946 to 1947, Constantino once again served as town solicitor. From 1947 to 1951 he was a member of the Massachusetts Civil Service Commission. From 1951 to 1954 he represented the 11th Worcester District in the Massachusetts House of Representatives. In 1954, he was the Republican nominee for Massachusetts State Auditor. He lost to incumbent Thomas J. Buckley by a margin of 59% to 40%.

== Judicial career ==
From 1954 until his retirement in 1981, Constantino was presiding justice of Clinton District Court. In 1959, he was also appointed to the Worcester Superior Court.

Constantino died on July 29, 1989, in Marlborough, Massachusetts. He was survived by his wife and four children, one of whom, William Constantino Jr., also served as a state representative.

== See also ==
- 1951–1952 Massachusetts legislature
- 1953–1954 Massachusetts legislature

Party political offices
Preceded by David J. Mintz	Republican nominee for Auditor of Massachusetts; 1954	Succeeded by Joseph A. Nobile
