= Francis Mara =

Massachusetts politician (born 1950)

Member of the Massachusetts House of Representatives from the 11th Plymouth district
- In office 1983–1994

Personal details
- Born: November 6, 1950 (age 75) Brockton, Massachusetts, US
- Education: Suffolk University; Harvard Graduate School of Education

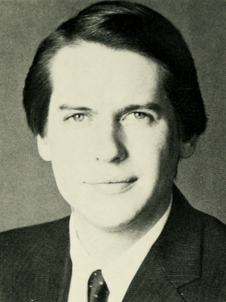
Portrait of Francis, member of the Massachusetts House of Representatives

Francis Mara (born November 6, 1950) was an American politician who was the member of the Massachusetts House of Representatives from the 11th Plymouth district.
