= Albert Herren =

American politician

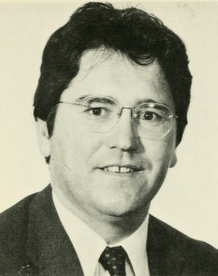
- Portrait of Albert Herren

Member of the Massachusetts House of Representatives from the 6th Bristol district
- In office 1985–1997
- Preceded by: Thomas C. Norton
- Succeeded by: David B. Sullivan

Personal details
- Born: June 8, 1952 (age 74) Fall River, Massachusetts
- Party: Democratic
- Education: Bristol Community College; Suffolk University
- Occupation: Family services program administrator Politician

Albert Herren (born June 8, 1952) is an American politician who represented the 6th Bristol District in the Massachusetts House of Representatives from 1985 to 1997.
