= John C. Bradford =

American politician (born 1940)

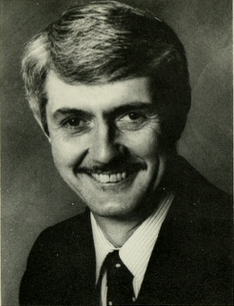

Member of the Massachusetts House of Representatives from the 10th Bristol district
- In office 1985–1993
- Preceded by: Roger Tougas
- Succeeded by: William M. Straus

Personal details
- Born: February 16, 1940 (age 86) Middleborough, Massachusetts, U.S.
- Party: Republican
- Education: Bridgewater State College
- Occupation: Carpenter; Politician

John C. Bradford (born February 16, 1940) is an American carpenter and politician who represented 10th Bristol District in the Massachusetts House of Representatives from 1985 to 1993. Before becoming a state representative, Bradford served on the Town of Rochester Finance Committee from 1983 to 1984.

After serving eight years in the Massachusetts House of Representatives, Bradford was appointed Administrative Judge to the Massachusetts Board of Industrial Accidents in August 1992 by former Republican Gov. William Weld. He served five years on the Board before retiring in 1997.

Bradford and his wife Daphne retired in the town of Orland, Maine.

== Life before politics ==
After graduating from Middleborough High School in 1958, Bradford joined the U.S. Navy in 1959. During his tenure in the Navy he served three years in Argentia, Newfoundland where he met and married Daphne Spurrell of St. John's, Newfoundland, in 1961. In 1963 he was honorably discharged from the Navy as Petty Officer second class, and the couple returned to his Bradford's home town of Middleborough, eventually settling in Rochester, Massachusetts. He lived there for 21 years with his wife and three children, Denise, Allyson, and William. Bradford operated his own carpentry business from 1969 to 1984. He contracted to build complete homes from framing to custom built cabinets and interior finish work.

== Education ==
Attending college at night, Bradford received a B.A. from Bridgewater State College in 1974 with a major in history and a minor in behavioral sciences. In 1995 he completed advanced courses in administrative law at the National Judicial College, American Bar Association. In 1996 he completed a seminar in administrative law at the Flaschner Judicial Institute in Boston.
