= Frank Emilio (politician) =

American politician (born 1935)

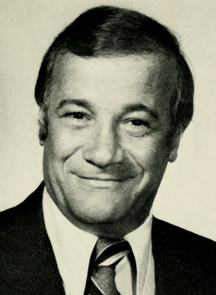

Member of the Massachusetts House of Representatives from the 3rd Essex District
- In office 1981–1991
- Preceded by: Francis Bevilacqua
- Succeeded by: Brian Dempsey

Personal details
- Born: August 31, 1935 Haverhill, Massachusetts
- Died: October 6, 2023 (aged 88)
- Party: Democratic
- Education: Haverhill High School
- Occupation: Insurance Broker

Frank A. Emilio (August 31, 1935 - October 6, 2023) was an American politician who represented the 3rd Essex district in the Massachusetts House of Representatives from 1981 to 1991. Prior to serving in the House, he spent six years as a Haverhill City Councilor.

Emilio was defeated by Haverhill City Councilor Brian Dempsey in the 1990 Democratic primary.
