= Francis H. Woodward =

American politician

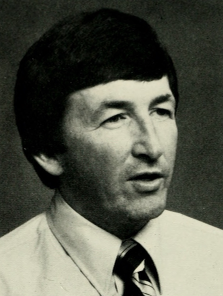

Member of the Massachusetts House of Representatives
- In office 1977–1993
- Preceded by: Alan Danovitch
- Succeeded by: Jo Ann Sprague

Personal details
- Born: March 17, 1939 (age 87) Boston, Massachusetts
- Party: Democratic
- Education: Newman Preparatory School; Dean Junior College
- Occupation: Lineman; State legislator

Francis H. Woodward is a former American politician who was a member of the Massachusetts House of Representatives from 1977 to 1993.

== Early life ==
Woodward was born on March 17, 1939, in Boston. He attended Boston public schools, Newman Preparatory School, and Dean Junior College. In 1962 he married Kathleen Sprague of West Roxbury. Prior to becoming a legislator, Woodward worked as a lineman for Boston Edison.

== Political career ==
In 1976, Woodward defeated incumbent State Representative Alan Danovitch. During his early years in the legislature, Woodward often opposed House leadership, but did so without voicing loud criticisms, which allowed him to have a good relationship with them. In 1985, reform-minded George Keverian became Speaker and chose Woodward to replace Theodore J. Aleixo, Jr., a Thomas W. McGee loyalist, as Chairman of the Insurance Committee.

=== Mandatory seat-belt law ===
On December 26, 1983, Woodward's eighteen-year-old daughter Carolyn was killed in an automobile accident. She was the passenger in a car that was struck head-on by a drunken driver. Based on his conversations with the emergency-room physician at the hospital where his daughter died, Woodward believed that his daughter would've survived the crash had she been wearing a seat belt.

After the accident, Woodward became an ardent supporter of the proposed mandatory seat-belt law. The mandatory seat-belt law passed the House on July 16, 1985, and, after it passed the Senate, was signed into law. The law was struck down by voters via a ballot question in the 1986 election.

In 1987, Woodward supported a bill that would raise the age for mandatory car-seat restraints from 5 to 12. He also sponsored legislation that would require the installation of breath alcohol ignition interlock devices on cars of repeat drunk driving offenders.

=== Other legislation ===
Woodward opposed the "Gay Rights Bill", which prohibited discrimination based on sexual orientation in the areas of housing, insurance, credit and employment.

Woodward proposed building a 500-bed, medium-security prison on state land next to Massachusetts Correctional Institution – Cedar Junction. The proposal would've prevented the state from building a prison on a controversial site in New Braintree, Massachusetts, and prevented the Massachusetts Water Resources Authority (MWRA) from using the Walpole site for a landfill. The proposal was supported by Massachusetts Department of Correction Commissioner George Vose, but opposed by Governor Michael Dukakis and the MWRA. The prison was constructed in New Braintree as planned, however Dukakis' successor, William Weld, converted the facility into a law enforcement training center shortly after construction was completed. The MWRA entered an agreement to have its sludge cake output disposed of at a commercial landfill in Utah and the Walpole landfill was never built.

== Post-political career ==
In 1991, Woodward was removed from his position as Insurance Committee Chairman by Keverian's successor Charles Flaherty. In 1992 it was announced that he would retire from the legislature to become an administrative judge with the state's Industrial Accident Board.

=== Illegal gratuities ===
On July 28, 1995, Woodward was indicted on charges of depriving taxpayers of honest services through mail and wire fraud, conspiracy, interstate travel to commit bribery, and lying on State Ethics Commission reports. According to United States Assistant Attorney General Jonathan Chiel, Woodward received illegal gratuities from John Hancock Mutual Life Insurance Co. lobbyist F. William Sawyer from 1986 to 1992 and attempted to conceal it by filing false financial disclosure forms. The gratuities allegedly included free golf trips to Savannah, Georgia, Orlando, Florida, Lake Buena Vista, Florida, Hilton Head Island, South Carolina, and Scottsdale, Arizona, as well as a trip to Super Bowl XX in New Orleans, Louisiana. Woodward's attorney claimed that Sawyer gave Woodward the gifts out of friendship, not in an attempt to influence him as a legislator.

Woodward's trial began on September 16, 1996. October 2, 1996, he was found guilty of five counts of accepting illegal gratuities during his tenure as Chairman of the Insurance Committee, but not guilty of twenty-one counts that occurred between his removal as Chairman and his departure from the House. On February 7, 1997, Judge Douglas P. Woodlock dismissed one of the five counts and sentenced Woodward to six months in a federal halfway house and fined him $5,000. In 2002, the Massachusetts Retirement Board voted to revoke Woodward's pension.

Political offices
Preceded by Theodore J. Aleixo, Jr.	Chairman of the Massachusetts House of Representatives Insurance Committee; 1985–1991	Succeeded by Francis Mara
