= Joseph M. Connolly =

American police detective and politician

Member of the Massachusetts House of Representatives from the 5th Middlesex district
- In office 1983–1991
- Preceded by: Lou Nickinello
- Succeeded by: Douglas Stoddart

Personal details
- Born: January 5, 1924 Charlestown, Boston, Massachusetts, U.S.
- Died: February 21, 2007 (aged 83) Natick, Massachusetts, U.S.
- Party: Democratic

Joseph M. Connolly (1924–2007) was an American police detective and politician who represented the 5th Middlesex District in the Massachusetts House of Representatives from 1983 to 1991.
