= Barbara Hildt =

American politician

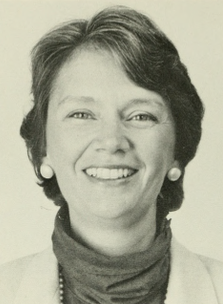
- Hildt, circa 1987

Member of the Massachusetts House of Representatives from the 1st Essex district
- In office 1983–1993
- Preceded by: Nicholas J. Costello
- Succeeded by: Frank Cousins

Personal details
- Born: April 13, 1946 (age 80) Albany, New York
- Party: Democratic
- Spouse(s): David T. Hildt (1968–1997; divorced); Allan MacGregor (1997–present)
- Education: Massachusetts College of Art
- Occupation: Art education Activist

Barbara A. Hildt (born April 13, 1946) is an American politician who represented the 1st Essex District in the Massachusetts House of Representatives from 1983 to 1993.

== Early life ==
Hildt was born on April 13, 1946, in Albany, New York. Her father was an associate Congregational pastor from Newton, Massachusetts and her mother was a Quaker from Maryland. She graduated from Newton North High School and attended Bard College. During her freshman year, she interned as an art educator at an inner-city school in Washington D.C. She enjoyed the experience so much that she decided to remain in the city to teach art and study art education at American University. While in D.C. she met her future husband, David T. Hildt, who was studying French at Georgetown University. From 1968 to 1971, the Hildts spent three years with the Peace Corps in Brazil. They then settled in Gloucester, Massachusetts. Barbara worked with the Neighborhood Youth Corps and David taught in neighboring Rockport, Massachusetts. They later served as house parents at The Cambridge School of Weston while Hildt earned her degree from the Massachusetts College of Art. In 1976 they moved to Amesbury, Massachusetts.

== Political career ==
In 1983, in her first run for public office, Hildt defeated six men to win the Democratic nomination for the 1st Essex District seat in the Massachusetts House of Representatives. She ran unopposed in the special election to fill the unexpired term of Nicholas J. Costello, who had been previously elected to fill the term of state senator Sharon Pollard following Pollard's appointment as Massachusetts Secretary of Energy. In 1984 she defeated C. Bruce Brown, father of future U.S. Senator Scott Brown for her first full term. Hildt did not take an oath of office with the other 199 members of the Massachusetts General Court, but instead took it separately as her Quaker beliefs did not permit her to "swear" an oath. An antinuclear activist, Hildt opposed construction of the Seabrook Station Nuclear Power Plant, which was located three miles north of Amesbury. She supported increased funding for education, reform of the state foster care system, environmental issues, domestic violence prevention, abortion, LGBT, and prisoner rights, and introduced anti-pornography and universal health care legislation. Hildt was a long-time director of the Women's Action for New Directions and co-founded the Women Legislators' Lobby, a national non-partisan coalition of women state legislators.

In February 1992, Hildt announced that she would not run for reelection, citing family considerations. She instead decided to challenge Nicholas Mavroules, the Democratic incumbent representative from Massachusetts's 6th congressional district, who was under federal investigation. On August 27, 1992, Mavroules was indicted on 17 charges, including bribery, tax evasion, and influence peddling. However, Mavroules defeated Hildt by 669 votes. After Mavroules' defeat in the general election, Hildt planned on challenging his Republican successor, Peter G. Torkildsen. However, in July 1993 she decided against running.

== Post-political career ==
Following her defeat in the 1992 election, Hildt designed violence prevention programs for the Medical Foundation and was a public policy fellow at Radcliffe College's Bunting Institute. She later served as director of the North Essex Prevention Coalition and Youth Empowerment Services. In 1997, Barbara and David Hildt divorced. In 2001, David Hildt was elected mayor of Amesbury. In 2000 she ran for her old house seat, but finished a distant third in the Democratic primary. As of 2020, Hildt and her second husband, Allan MacGregor, reside in Mexico.
