= John P. Burke =

American politician

Member of the Massachusetts State Senate
- In office 1979–1991
- Preceded by: Roger L. Bernashe
- Succeeded by: Martin J. Dunn

Personal details
- Born: December 2, 1954 (age 71) Washington D.C.
- Party: Democratic
- Spouse: Mary Adele Burke (m. 1992)
- Children: 2
- Education: Georgetown University

John P. Burke is an American politician, who served in the Massachusetts Senate from 1979 to 1991. At the time of his election, he was the youngest senator to ever serve in a state senate, at the age of 24.

== See also ==
- Massachusetts Senate's 1st Hampden and Hampshire district
