= Paul D. Harold =

American politician (1948-2002)

Paul Harold
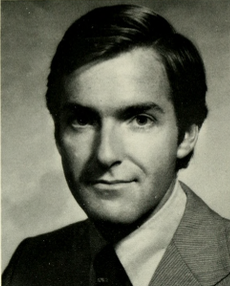

Norfolk County Register of Deeds
- In office 2001–2005
- Preceded by: Barry T. Hannon
- Succeeded by: William P. O'Donnell

Member of the Massachusetts Senate from the Norfolk district
- In office 1979–1993
- Preceded by: Arthur Tobin
- Succeeded by: Michael W. Morrissey

Member of the Quincy City Council at-large
- In office 1975–1978

Personal details
- Born: September 5, 1948 Boston, Massachusetts, U.S.
- Died: August 11, 2002 (aged 53)
- Party: Democratic
- Education: Harvard University (M.P.A.); Suffolk Law School (J.D.); University of Massachusetts Amherst (B.A.)
- Occupation: Lawyer

Paul D. Harold (September 5, 1948 – August 11, 2002) was a member of the Massachusetts Senate and the Registrar of Deeds for Norfolk County, Massachusetts. Previously he served on the Quincy, Massachusetts City Council. He died in 2002. He graduated from the University of Massachusetts Amherst, Suffolk Law School, and Harvard Kennedy School.
