= Raymond A. Jordan =

American politician (1943–2022)

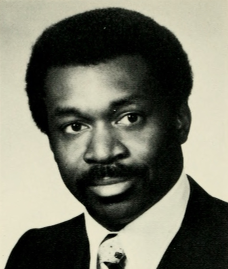
- Jordan in 1983

Member of the Massachusetts House of Representatives from the 12th Hampden district
- In office January 1, 1975 – February 28, 1994

Personal details
- Born: May 5, 1943 Springfield, Massachusetts
- Died: February 5, 2022 (aged 78) Springfield, Massachusetts
- Party: Democratic

Raymond A. Jordan Jr. (May 5, 1943 – February 5, 2022) was an American politician from Massachusetts. A member of the Democratic Party, he served as a member of the Massachusetts House of Representatives, representing Springfield from 1975 until 1994.

== Early life and education ==
Raymond A. Jordan Jr. was born in Springfield, Massachusetts, on May 5, 1943. He attended the Springfield Technical High School and later enrolled at the University of Massachusetts Amherst, from which he graduated with a Bachelor of Arts degree. and later a MPA from Harvard Kennedy School. Jordan served as director of the Afro-American Cultural Center at American International College in Springfield. During the 1960s, he was arrested on the Springfield City Hall's steps while protesting for civil rights.

== Political career ==
In November 1974, Jordan was elected to the newly created 13th Hampden district in the Massachusetts House of Representatives, defeating Republican candidate Benjamin Swan by a margin of 2,043 to 1,548. He was the first African-American from outside Boston to be elected to Massachusetts's legislature. In the 1975–1976 legislative session, Jordan voted in favor of ratifying the Equal Rights Amendment (which passed 188–45), against a bill to cut welfare benefits (which passed 198–30), against an effort to reinstate capital punishment over the governor's veto (which passed 166–54), in favor of a measure to reauthorize rent control (which passed 176–49), and against a measure to ban handguns (which failed 35–197). That session, he received a 91% rating from the Americans for Democratic Action, an 82% rating from the AFL–CIO, and a 0% rating from the Citizens for Limited Taxation.

Jordan served as president of the Massachusetts Black Legislative Caucus and as chairman of the House's Committee on Counties. A 1983 column in The Boston Globe described him as "a 40-year-old professional politician with deceptive countrified charm and a taste for inside wheeling and dealing". He served as a delegate to the 1984 Democratic National Convention, supporting Walter Mondale's bid for the presidential nomination and favoring unsuccessful proposed amendments to the party platform that called for reductions in military spending and opposed pre-emptive nuclear strikes. A state campaign finance office concluded in 1994 that Jordan had spent campaign funds renting an apartment, ostensibly in violation of the law; no action was taken against him after he agreed to stop making such payments. He resigned on February 28, 1994, to accept a position in the federal government.

== Later life and death ==
Jordan spent eighteen years at the United States Department of Housing and Urban Development. He served in several different posts, including special project officer for New England, senior community builder and state coordinator for the Connecticut office, and liaison for faith-based and community initiatives. Jordan retired from the department in 2012. He served as vice-chair of the Massachusetts Democratic Party until 2016, making him the longest-serving vice-chair in the party's history and the state's first African-American to serve on the Democratic National Committee. He served as a member of the Electoral College in the 2008 presidential election, casting his vote for Barack Obama. During the 2016 Democratic Party presidential primaries, he served as a superdelegate, supporting Hillary Clinton. In 2019, the Raymond A. Jordan Senior Center, named for Jordan, opened; U.S. Representative Richard Neal stated: "I can't think of a better tribute that we might offer Ray Jordan than naming this facility after him." Jordan died on February 5, 2022, at the age of 78. The mayor of Springfield, Domenic Sarno, lauded him as "a well-respected champion for his district" and "a caring and shrewd gentleman, who could work both sides of the aisle in order to deliver for the people, families and businesses of his district." U.S. Senator Ed Markey said that Jordan "was one of the central figures in the transformation of the Massachusetts State House" and that "he made sure equal opportunity and justice were central to state policymaking".
