= Alfred E. Saggese Jr. =

American politician (born 1946)

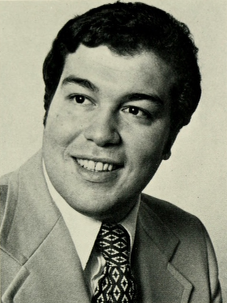
- Alfred Saggese portrait

Member of the Massachusetts House of Representatives from the 20th Suffolk district
- In office January 3, 1979 – January 2, 1991
- Preceded by: Brian J. Donnelly
- Succeeded by: Robert DeLeo

Member of the Massachusetts House of Representatives from the 30th Suffolk district
- In office January 1, 1975 – January 3, 1979
- Preceded by: District created
- Succeeded by: District abolished

Personal details
- Born: November 21, 1946 (age 79)
- Party: Democratic

Alfred E. Saggese Jr. (born November 21, 1946) is an American politician who served in the Massachusetts House of Representatives 1975 to 1991.
