= William Constantino Jr. =

American lawyer and politician

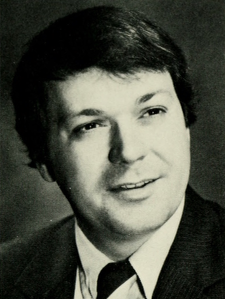

Member of the Massachusetts House of Representatives from the 12th Worcester District
- In office 1983–1995
- Preceded by: Thomas F. Fallon
- Succeeded by: Harold Naughton Jr.

Personal details
- Born: May 27, 1944 (age 82) Clinton, Massachusetts
- Party: Republican
- Relations: William P. Constantino (father)
- Education: College of the Holy Cross (BA); Fitchburg State College; Suffolk University Law School (JD)
- Occupation: Attorney

William Paul Constantino Jr. is an American lawyer and politician who represented the 12th Worcester District in the Massachusetts House of Representatives from 1983 to 1995. His father, William P. Constantino, also served in that house. His nephew, Mike Bonin, is a former Los Angeles City Councilor.
