= David H. Locke =

American politician (1927–2019)

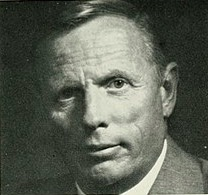
- David H. Locke, circa 1991

Minority Leader of the Massachusetts Senate
- In office 1989–1993
- Preceded by: John F. Parker
- Succeeded by: Brian Lees

Minority Whip of the Massachusetts Senate
- In office 1971–1988
- Preceded by: William D. Weeks
- Succeeded by: Paul Cellucci

Member of the Massachusetts Senate
- In office 1969–1993
- Preceded by: Leslie Bradley Cutler
- Succeeded by: Cheryl Jacques

Personal details
- Born: August 4, 1927 Boston, Massachusetts, United States
- Died: December 12, 2019 (aged 92)
- Party: Republican
- Education: Harvard University; Harvard Law School
- Occupation: Lawyer; Politician

David Henry Locke (August 4, 1927 – December 12, 2019) was an American politician who served in the Massachusetts General Court from 1961 to 1993.

== Early life ==
Locke was born on August 4, 1927, in Boston, Massachusetts. He lived in Wellesley, Massachusetts and graduated from Wellesley High School in 1945. He served in the United States Marine Corps. Locke graduated from Harvard University in 1951 and from Harvard Law School in 1954. Locke practiced law in Wellesley, Massachusetts.

== Political career ==
Locke served on the Wellesley, Massachusetts, Board of Selectmen from 1959 to 1962 and was the board's chairman from 1961 to 1962. From 1961 to 1969 he was a member of the Massachusetts House of Representatives. He then served in the Massachusetts Senate from 1969 to 1993. He was the Assistant Minority Floor Leader of the Senate from 1971 to 1989 and Minority Floor Leader from 1989 to 1993. He was defeated by Cheryl Jacques in 1992.

== See also ==
- Massachusetts Senate's Norfolk, Bristol and Middlesex district
- Massachusetts Senate's 2nd Middlesex and Norfolk district
