= Peter A. Vellucci =

American politician (1942-2014)

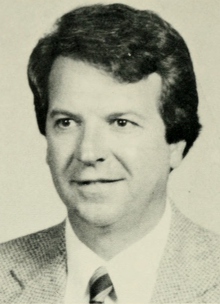
Peter Vellucci Portrait

Peter A. Vellucci (1942/43 – August 4, 2014) was an American politician who served in the Massachusetts House of Representatives from 1982 to 1992. He was succeeded by Timothy J. Toomey, Jr.

== See also ==
- Massachusetts House of Representatives' 29th Middlesex district
