= Robert A. Cerasoli =

American politician

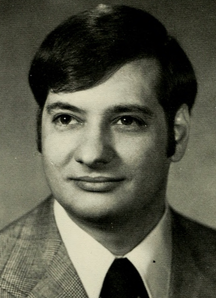

Inspector General of Massachusetts
- In office 1991–2001
- Preceded by: Joseph R. Barresi
- Succeeded by: Gregory W. Sullivan

Member of the Massachusetts House of Representatives from the 3rd Norfolk district
- In office 1979–1991
- Preceded by: Michael W. Morrissey
- Succeeded by: Ronald Mariano

Member of the Massachusetts House of Representatives from the 1st Norfolk district
- In office 1975–1979
- Preceded by: Thomas F. Brownell
- Succeeded by: Michael W. Morrissey

Personal details
- Party: Democratic

Robert A. Cerasoli is a former member of the Massachusetts House of Representatives, the former Inspector General of the Commonwealth of Massachusetts, and the former Inspector General of the City of New Orleans. He also founded the Association of Inspectors General in 1996.

== Education ==
Cerasoli completed his undergraduate education at the American University in Washington, D.C. and his graduate education at Harvard Kennedy School.

== Career ==
Cerasoli is retired from over 37 years of public service in the Commonwealth of Massachusetts and the City of New Orleans, Louisiana.

=== Massachusetts ===
He began his public service career in the Massachusetts House of Representatives in 1970 and served as chairman of the House Post Audit and Oversight Committee, a "fiscal watchdog panel". During his time, he investigated the matter of Massachusetts' prisons giving furloughs to some murderers, prompted by the well-publicized Willie Horton story. In 1989, when House Speaker George Keverian demanded that he and other representatives either support a bill for higher taxes or lose their jobs, Cerasoli resigned instead, knowing that he could not support the bill.

In 1991, Cerasoli was chosen unanimously to serve as the Inspector General (IG) of the Commonwealth of Massachusetts. He launched several investigations and issued many reports but is most widely known for pointing out flaws in the Big Dig highway construction project through the city of Boston. The report would prove to be an "I told you so" when part of the tunnel would later collapse as a result of "cutting corners", causing one death. Although then-outgoing Massachusetts governor Paul Cellucci removed funding for the state IG in his next budget, the Massachusetts House of Representatives changed the figures to include $2.3 million for the office, defending it from what was widely seen as retribution for criticism of the governor's handling of the Big Dig. Cerasoli was one of two finalists in a run for Inspector General of the United States House of Representatives, but there was widespread speculation that a Republican candidate would instead be chosen due to Republican control in the House.

After retiring from his post, he taught at Eastern Nazarene College and the local community college, in his home town of Quincy, Massachusetts. He also taught ethics courses in several African nations and other countries around the world.

=== New Orleans ===
Cerasoli left retirement in 2007 when he was unanimously voted to become the first-ever Inspector General for the City of New Orleans, a post that "was created in late 2006 by the City Council to send a message that New Orleans could be trusted to spend federal recovery aid after Hurricane Katrina," although the City Charter was amended to require an office as early as 1995.

The position required that Cerasoli start the office from scratch. Initially without a budget beyond $250,000, no office, no staff, and no car, Loyola University President Kevin Wildes, the chairman of the city's Ethics Review Board, provided Cerasoli temporary office space in the stacks at the university library. By a vote of the citizens of New Orleans, a city charter amendment was passed to secure funding for the office, roughly 3/4 of one per cent of the city budget. The State of Louisiana also showed unanimous support for Cerasoli's office by widening the powers of the office and making them part of state law in House Bill 80. The office released its first report in December 2008, on the city's take-home-car policy. It revealed that the city allows 273 employees, not including the mayor or the police department, take-home cars in spite of a city ordinance that limits the number to 60, and calculated that the city could save roughly $1 million by complying with that law. Other investigations were initiated, but no reports have yet been published because the investigations are ongoing.

Despite state and citizen support, Cerasoli ran into several roadblocks with city administration, including a shipment of computers that was improperly sent to City Hall, where they were kept in the basement for two weeks and some of the boxes were opened. Upon receiving them at their office, the IG staff proceeded to wipe their memories in order to reverse any potential tampering. Another notable obstacle to the establishment if the IG office was Mayor Ray Nagin's cancellation of law enforcement equipment purchases, despite the IG office's status as a law enforcement agency in the city charter amendment. Cerasoli received support from officials such as Councilwoman Shelley Midura, who said that Nagin used "inflammatory language and limited executive branch resources to fight a non-issue." New Orleans CityBusiness reported the Louisiana state IG as having said that "weapon purchases by inspectors general are routine" and state senator J.P. Morell as saying that Cerasoli was "reasonable" and, "unless you're a city official doing something wrong with contracts ... there's no reason to be afraid of the office."

Cerasoli resigned in January 2009. He cited recent health concerns, two non-cancerous growths surgically removed in December and two other potentially cancerous growths yet to be removed.
