= John A. Brennan Jr. =

American politician

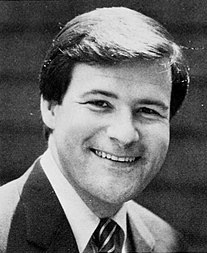
John Brennan, circa 1983

John A. Brennan Jr. (born September 19, 1945) is an American lobbyist and former legislator who served in the Massachusetts House of Representatives from 1973 to 1974 and the Massachusetts Senate from 1974 to 1990. He is a Democrat from Malden.

== See also ==
- Massachusetts Senate's 3rd Middlesex district
