= M. Joseph Manning =

American politician

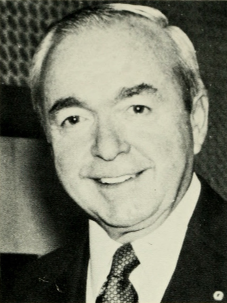
Joseph Manning Portrait

Martin Joseph Manning (September 23, 1924 – April 14, 2015), known as Joe Manning, was an American politician who was a member of the Massachusetts House of Representatives. A member of the Democratic Party, represented the 7th Norfolk District from 1966 to 1996.

He was a lifelong resident of Milton, Massachusetts and served with the Marine Corps in World War II. He served for nearly seven decades on the Milton town meeting, serving from 1946 to his death in 2015.

== Personal life ==
Manning was married to his wife, Audrey, for over 50 years, whom he had a son with, M. Joseph Manning Jr. He died in 2015.
