= Robert W. Healy =

American politician

City Manager of Cambridge, Massachusetts
- In office 1981–2013
- Preceded by: James Sullivan
- Succeeded by: Richard Rossi

Acting City Manager of Lowell, Massachusetts
- In office 1974–1974
- Preceded by: James Sullivan
- Succeeded by: Paul J. Sheehy

Personal details
- Born: August 1943 (age 83) Cambridge, Massachusetts
- Education: University of Massachusetts Amherst; Lowell State College

Robert W. Healy (born August 1943) is an American city manager who was the longest-serving city manager in the history of Cambridge, Massachusetts. He served from July 1, 1981 until June 30, 2013. Prior to assuming that position, Healy initially served as acting city manager from July 1, 1981 to December 14, 1981. He also served as acting City Manager of Lowell, Massachusetts in 1974.

== Early life ==
Healy was born in the North Cambridge neighborhood of Cambridge. During his youth his family moved to Billerica, Massachusetts. He attended the Catholic Keith Academy in Lowell and earned a bachelor's degree in English from University of Massachusetts Amherst in 1965. After graduating he taught English and coached football and hockey at Tewksbury Memorial High School. In 1969, Healy left teaching to become a probation officer at the Lowell District Court.

== Early government career ==
In 1970, Healy was hired by Lowell Mayor Richard P. Howe to run his city hall office. That same year he earned his master's degree in educational administration from Lowell State College. Later that year he was named assistant city manager by city manager James Sullivan. When Sullivan departed Lowell for Cambridge in 1974, Healy served as acting city manager for one month. State Representative Paul Sheehy was chosen over Healy for the permanent job by the Lowell City Council after 53 ballots. After being passed over, Healy followed Sullivan to Cambridge to be deputy city manager. After Sheehy was fired in 1975, Healy applied for the job again. He was a finalist alongside William Taupier and Armand Mercier. Taupier was selected after sixteen ballots.

== Cambridge city manager ==
On May 18, 1981, Sullivan announced that he was resigning effective July 1 to become President of the Greater Boston Chamber of Commerce. Healy was Sullivan's preferred successor and on June 8 the city council voted 8 to 1 to name him acting city manager upon Sullivan's departure. On December 14, 1981, Healy was named permanent manager. Healy retired as City Manager on June 30, 2013.

During the Occupy Wall Street protests, reports criticized the salary of the City Manager as being one of the highest in the State of Massachusetts. His salary was higher than that of the Mayor of the City of Boston, and that of the Governor of Massachusetts, In February 2011, City Councillor Leland Cheung pushed a policy order that would call for greater transparency in city council contracts for the Office of the City Manager's salary.
