= Natalie Enright Jerger =

American computer scientist

- Born: Natalie Dana Enright; Plainfield, New Jersey, US
- Education: Kent Place School; Purdue University; University of Wisconsin
- Known for: Computer architecture
- Relatives: Tony Lupien (grandfather); Ulysses J. Lupien (great-grandfather); John Cena (cousin)
- Awards: CRA-W BECA award (2015); Alfred P. Sloan Foundation Fellowship (2015); ACM Distinguished Member (2018)
- Scientific career
- Fields: Computer science
- Workplaces: University of Toronto
- Doctoral advisor: Mikko Lipasti and Li-Shiuan Peh
- Website: www.eecg.toronto.edu/~enright

Natalie Dana Enright Jerger (née Enright) is an American computer scientist known for research in computer science including computer architecture and interconnection networks.

== Education and career ==
Jerger was born in Plainfield, New Jersey, and attended Kent Place School. She received a BS in computer engineering from Purdue University in 2002, and a PhD from the University of Wisconsin-Madison studying Computer Architecture.

She joined the Edward S. Rogers Sr. Department of Electrical and Computer Engineering at the University of Toronto in 2009 as an assistant professor. She was promoted to associate professor in 2014 and to professor in 2017, becoming the Percy Edward Hart Professor of Electrical and Computer Engineering. Enright Jerger co-chairs the ACM Council on Diversity and Inclusion. In 2023, she was promoted as director of the Division of Engineering Science at the University of Toronto.

== Honours and awards ==
- 2014: Young Engineer Medal from Professional Engineers Ontario.
- 2015: CRA-W Anita Borg Early Career Award (BECA). 2015 Alfred P. Sloan Research Fellowship.
- 2018: ACM Distinguished Member
- 2019: Canada Research Chair in Computer Architecture.
- 2019: University of Toronto McLean Award.
- 2021: Elected as an IEEE Fellow "for contributions to networks-on-chip for many-core architectures".
- 2024: Elected as a Fellow of the Canadian Academy of Engineering

== Activities ==
Enright Jerger has been vocal about the lack of diversity in her field, particularly regarding gender representation. She was part of a group that publicly raised concerns about diversity during the ACM SIGARCH MICRO-50 conference, specifically regarding an all-white-male panel titled "Legends of MICRO." As a response to perceived lack of progress through quieter means, Enright Jerger and her colleagues decided to "step to the microphone" and make their concerns public. At the University of Toronto, Enright Jerger has been described by her colleagues as "tireless" and "stubborn" in her pursuit of gender inclusivity. She acknowledges her reputation for stubbornness, stating, "I am incredibly stubborn. And I'm not going to let go of this until I feel that we've achieved what we want to achieve".

== Personal life ==
Enright Jerger is the grand-daughter of professional baseball player Tony Lupien, the great-granddaughter of Ulysses J. Lupien and cousin of professional wrestler and actor John Cena.
