= Ulysses Lupien =

Ulysses Lupien may refer to:

- Ulysses J. Lupien (1883–1965), American government official
- Ulysses J. "Tony" Lupien, Jr. (1917–2004 ), American first baseman in Major League Baseball
