= James Ayer =

James Ayer may refer to:

- James Cook Ayer (1818–1878), patent medicine businessman
- James H. B. Ayer (1788–1864), mayor of Lowell, Massachusetts
