= Henry Beaudry =

American politician

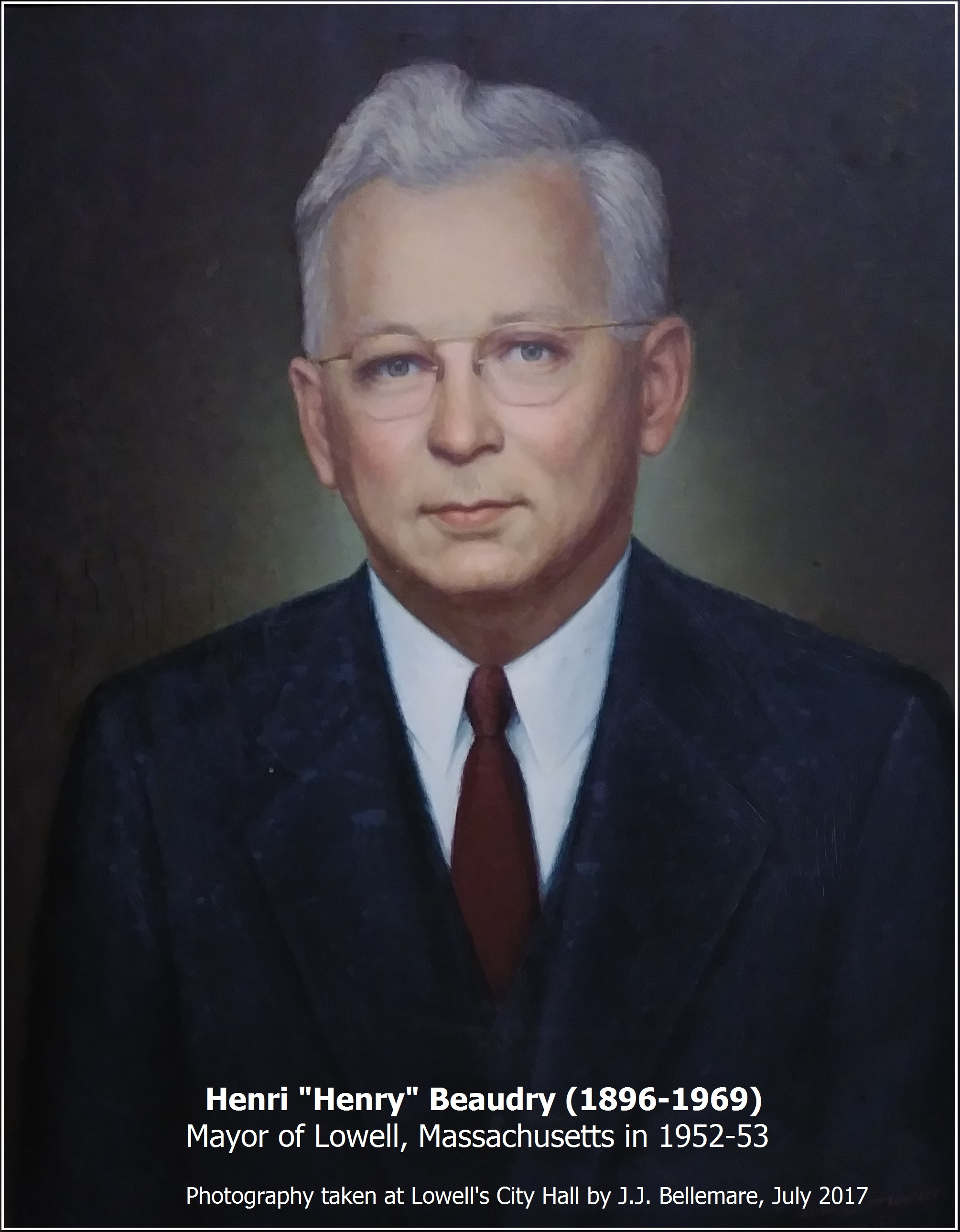

61st Mayor of Lowell, Massachusetts
- In office 1952–1953
- Preceded by: George C. Eliades
- Succeeded by: John Janas

Member of the City Council of Lowell, Massachusetts
- In office 1952–1955

Member of the School Committee of Lowell, Massachusetts
- In office 1944–1945

Member of the School Committee of Lowell, Massachusetts
- In office 1948–1949

Personal details
- Born: February 14, 1896 Lowell, Massachusetts
- Died: March 14, 1969 Lowell, Massachusetts
- Resting place: St. Joseph Cemetery in Chelmsford, MA
- Party: Republican
- Spouse: Marie Laplante
- Children: Dorothy Beaudry Gifford; Beatrice Beaudry Sheehan
- Occupation: Restaurant owner

Henri "Henry" Beaudry (February 14, 1896 – March 14, 1969) was a local business person and a Franco-American politician who served as the sixty-first mayor of Lowell, Massachusetts.

== Politics ==
Beaudry was a Republican and a self-proclaimed middle-of-the-road public servant. He represented Ward 7, an area whose boundaries encompassed Lowell's Acre neighborhood.

He sat on the local school committee in 1944-45 and in 1948-49.

He was a defeated candidate for city councilor in 1939 and 1949. On his third attempt, he was elected to the city council and served two terms in 1952-53 and 1954-55. In January 1952, he was chosen by the city council on the 26th ballot to serve a two-year term as mayor.

Mayor Beaudry's accomplishments include the organization of the Grotto & Way of the Cross landmark near the Franco-American orphanage, the inaugural of the City of Lights parade, an annual event that celebrates the official start to the holiday season, and the October 16, 1952 presidential visit of Harry S. Truman to Lowell, MA. He attended social functions associated with the promotion of the French culture in New England. Under his tenure as mayor, the council ran through three city managers. Ulysses J. Lupien, another Franco-American Republican, was appointed with Beaudry's support. However, he was ousted a year later, against the mayor's wish.

Beaudry lost his bid for re-election to the city council in 1955.

== Business ==
As a youngster he worked as clerk for his parents' grocery store, located at 275-277 Aiken Street. In the 1940s and the 1950s, he was the owner of Henry's Restaurant, located at 331-333 Moody Street.

== Personal life ==
Beaudry was born in 1896 in Lowell, MA. He was a Roman Catholic and the son of French-speaking Canadian immigrants from Sainte-Émélie-de-l'Énergie, Québec.

He and his family lived at 776-780 Merrimack Street in 1939-1942 and on the upper floor of his restaurant business from 1946 until the time of his death.

He and his wife, Marie "Mary" Laplante Beaudry (1901-1975), divorced while he was in office. The couple had two daughters: Dorothy Beaudry Gifford (1925-...) and Beatrice Beaudry Sheehan (1926-2013).

He was a member of the Benevolent and Protective Order of Elks and served as president of the Saint Joseph's Roman Catholic College for Boys Alumni Committee.

His funeral took place in 1969 at Saint-Jean-Baptiste Roman Catholic Church, 741 Merrimack Street. He was buried at St. Joseph Cemetery, 96 Riverneck Road, Chelmsford, Massachusetts.

Henry Beaudry was mentioned in Jack Kerouac's writings.

Political offices
Preceded by George C. Eliades	61st Mayor of Lowell, Massachusetts; 1952-1953	Succeeded by John Janas
