= George Francis Richardson =

American politician

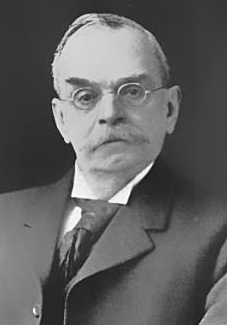

Member of the Massachusetts State Senate
- In office 1871–1873

19th Mayor of Lowell, Massachusetts
- In office 1867 – January 4, 1869
- Preceded by: Josiah G. Peabody
- Succeeded by: Jonathan P. Folsom

Member of the Lowell, Massachusetts Board of Aldermen
- In office 1864

President of the Lowell, Massachusetts Common Council
- In office 1862–1863
- Preceded by: William L. North
- Succeeded by: George Ripely

Member of the Lowell, Massachusetts Common Council Ward 6
- In office 1862–1863

Personal details
- Born: December 6, 1829 Tyngsborough, Massachusetts
- Died: March 22, 1912 (aged 82) Lowell, Massachusetts
- Party: Republican
- Education: Phillips Exeter Academy, Harvard College, 1850; Harvard Law School, 1853
- Occupation: Lawyer

George Francis Richardson (December 6, 1829 – March 22, 1912) was an American lawyer and politician who served as the nineteenth mayor of Lowell, Massachusetts, and as a member of the Massachusetts State Senate.

== Early life and career ==
Richardson was born to Daniel and Hannah (Adams) Richardson, in Tyngsborough, Massachusetts, on December 6, 1829. He was educated at Phillips Exeter Academy.

Lowell graduated from Harvard College in 1850 and Harvard Law School in 1853 After this, he worked as a lawyer.

== Political career ==
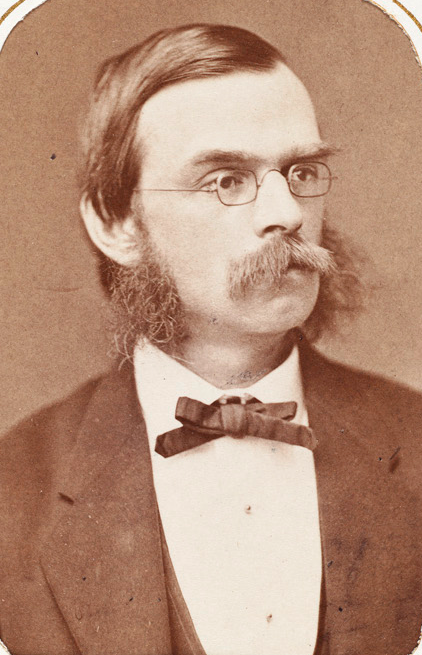
Richardson while he was a member of the Massachusetts Senate in 1872

Lowell held several offices as a Republican Party politician.

Richardson served as a member of the Lowell Common Council (the lower chamber of Lowell's city council), representing the 6th ward in 1862 and 1863. He served as president of the chamber for the duration of the tenure He served as a member of the Board of Aldermen (the upper chamber of Lowell's city council) in 1864.

Richardson was elected mayor of Lowell in 1867, and served as the city's nineteenth mayor from 1867 to 1869. He was a delegate to the 1868 Republican National Convention.

Richardson served as a member of the Massachusetts State Senate from 1871 to 1873.

== See also ==
- 1871 Massachusetts legislature
- 1872 Massachusetts legislature

Political offices
Preceded by Josiah G. Peabody	19th Mayor of Lowell, Massachusetts; 1867—January 4, 1869	Succeeded by Jonathan P. Folsom
