= Charles A. R. Dimon =

Union army colonel in US Civil War (1841-1902)

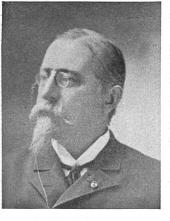
- Bvt. Brig. Gen. Charles A. R. Dimon c. 1890

37th Mayor of Lowell, Massachusetts
- In office 1901 – May 21, 1902
- Preceded by: Jeremiah Crowley
- Succeeded by: Charles E. Howe

Personal details
- Born: April 27, 1841 Fairfield, Connecticut
- Died: May 21, 1902 (aged 61) Lowell, Massachusetts
- Resting place: East Cemetery, Fairfield, Connecticut
- Awards: Brevet Brigadier General

Military service
- Allegiance: (United States) Union
- Branch/service: Union Army
- Years of service: 1861–1865
- Rank: Colonel
- Commands: 1st United States Volunteer Infantry
- Battles/wars: American Civil War

Charles Augustus Ropes Dimon (April 27, 1841 – May 5, 1902) was a volunteer soldier in the Union Army during the American Civil War. Beginning his service as a private in the 8th Regiment of Massachusetts Volunteer Infantry, Dimon rose through the ranks to become a colonel of a US Volunteer Infantry Regiment and was awarded the honorary grade of brevet brigadier general United States Volunteers, by appointment of President Andrew Johnson on January 13, 1866, to rank from March 13, 1865, and confirmation by the U.S. Senate on March 12, 1866. His success was due in part to the sponsorship of Major General Benjamin F. Butler.

In August 1864, Dimon (then only 23) was placed in command of the 1st United States Volunteer Infantry, consisting of former Confederate soldiers who had been prisoners-of-war. In exchange for an Oath of Allegiance to the United States and their volunteer service, the prisoners were pardoned. Due to their uncertain loyalty, however, the U.S. Volunteer regiments composed of ex-Confederates were primarily sent to the American West to combat Native Americans. Dimon therefore spent much of 1864 and 1865 in command of Fort Rice near present-day Bismarck, North Dakota.

After the war, Dimon became manager of the U.S. Cartridge Company in Lowell, Massachusetts and, in 1901, became mayor of Lowell.

== Early life ==
Born in Fairfield, Connecticut, to James and Amelia Dimon, Charles Dimon was educated at Fairfield Academy and relocated as a young man to Salem, Massachusetts, finding employment as a bookkeeper. When the Civil War commenced, Dimon, age 19, enlisted with the 8th Massachusetts Infantry on April 17, 1861.

== Civil War service ==
=== 8th Massachusetts ===
The 8th Massachusetts was one of the first regiments to respond to President Lincoln's initial call for volunteer troops following the fall of Fort Sumter. The unit enlisted for a period of 90 days. Dimon served as a private in Company J of the 8th Massachusetts, which was a Zouave company commanded by Captain Arthur F. Devereux. Upon their arrival in Maryland, Company J was assigned to the frigate USS Constitution in Annapolis, Maryland, to safeguard the iconic vessel as she was transported to New York. For the remainder of their service, the 8th Massachusetts was employed in repairing and guarding railroad lines in the vicinity of Baltimore, Maryland. Dimon returned to Massachusetts with the rest of the regiment and was mustered out on August 1, 1861.

=== 30th Massachusetts ===
In the fall of 1861, Dimon assisted in the recruitment of a new regiment which would become the 30th Massachusetts Infantry. The regiment was one of several being raised by Maj. Gen. Benjamin Butler for his planned expedition to take New Orleans, Louisiana, the largest city in the Confederacy. The regiment left Massachusetts on January 2, 1862, arrived off the Louisiana coast in mid February, and played a minor role in the Siege of New Orleans in April and May 1862.

Early in his service with the 30th Massachusetts, Dimon caught the attention of Maj. Gen. Butler who was impressed with the young man's energy and enthusiasm. Through Butler's influence, Dimon was commissioned 1st lieutenant on February 20, 1862, and given the position of regimental adjutant—an administrative role assisting Colonel Nathan Dudley, the commanding officer of the regiment.

Serving with the 30th Massachusetts, Dimon played a role in the regiment's efforts, in July 1862, to dig a canal opposite Vicksburg, Mississippi (the major Confederate stronghold on the Mississippi River). The aim was to redirect the river and circumvent Vicksburg, thus opening the Mississippi to the Union. The effort was unsuccessful, however, and the 30th's brigade marched to Baton Rouge, Louisiana, at the end of July. On August 5, 1862, Dimon and the 30th Massachusetts saw their first heavy combat during the Battle of Baton Rouge as the Confederates unsuccessfully attempted to recapture the state capital.

=== 2nd Louisiana ===
In September 1862, the 2nd Louisiana Infantry, a unit of Louisiana unionists and former Confederate prisoners-of-war was formed. Again, through Butler's sponsorship, Dimon was promoted to major and assigned to the 2nd Louisiana as third-in-command, serving under Col. Charles Jackson Paine. The 2nd Louisiana saw action during the Battle of Plains Store, and the Siege of Port Hudson in the spring and summer of 1863. After the second assault on Port Hudson in June 1863, Maj. Dimon fell ill and was discharged due to disability on June 22, 1863.

=== 1st United States Volunteers ===
After his recovery, in early 1864, Dimon sought a position on the staff of Maj. Gen. Butler, who was then in command of the Department of Virginia and North Carolina with headquarters at Fortress Monroe. Instead of placing Dimon on his staff, Butler appointed him as major of a new regiment, the 1st United States Volunteer Infantry, then being formed under Butler's supervision. The regiment, organized at the prisoner-of-war camp at Point Lookout, Maryland, would consist entirely of "Galvanized Yankees", Confederate prisoners willing to take an oath of loyalty to and fight for the Union in exchange for their freedom. Eventually, six such regiments would be formed. Dimon's new commission was effective March 18, 1864. Dimon was promoted to lieutenant colonel on April 2, 1864, and, on August 7, 1864, was promoted to colonel and command of 1st United States Volunteers at age 23.

During their first months of service, the 1st U.S. Volunteers saw combat in the vicinity of Elizabeth City, North Carolina, in the summer of 1864. However, Lt. Gen. Ulysses S. Grant, then in command of the Union army, decided that prisoner-of-war units should not be employed against their former comrades writing, "it is not right to expose them where, to be taken prisoners, they might surely suffer as deserters." Therefore, in August 1864, just as Dimon assumed command of the regiment, the 1st U.S. Volunteers were transferred to Fort Rice in the Dakota Territory. After travel by rail from New York and steamship up the Missouri River, the regiment marched the final 250 miles, reaching Fort Rice on October 17, 1864. As commander of the post, Dimon was instructed to complete the construction of the fort, aid settlers, and manage relations with Native Americans in the region.

After enduring a frigid winter, the 1st U.S. Volunteers were further troubled in the spring of 1865 by deteriorating relations with the Sioux people. These included the Yanktonai and Lakota people who perceived Fort Rice as a dangerous encroachment on their homeland and led repeated raids against it. Dimon, who had no experience in Native American relations, nonetheless was successful in fostering a positive relationship with the Yanktonai Chief Two Bears and, together, they began to build a growing alliance with the Yanktonai people. The positive relations were fleeting, however, as the arrival of additional troops in Dakota triggered a large attack on Fort Rice by the Sioux on July 28, 1865. The 1st U.S. Volunteers were successful in driving off the attack and the garrison survived that summer, according to historian Michele Butts, largely due to Dimon's "endless drills and strict discipline."

As commandant of Fort Rice, Dimon took a hardline approach to restricting illegal trade with the Native Americans, ordering the seizure of steamboats coming up the Missouri River and refusing to allow traders to pass without appropriate licenses from the army. He also tried to combat corruption on the part of the Office of Indian Affairs whose local officials frequently misappropriated funds. These practices made Dimon unpopular with civilians in the region and created political difficulties for his superior officer, Brig. Gen. Alfred Sully, who frequently ordered Dimon to change his practices.

Discouraged by these difficulties, Dimon requested a medical leave during September 1865. In his absence, the morale of the 1st U.S. Volunteers deteriorated when they learned that, despite the war's end, they would not be mustered out. Dimon returned to Fort Rice in October 1865 to find that many desertions had taken place and discipline was all but non-existent. News soon arrived, however, that the regiment would be mustered out after all and Dimon led what remained of the 1st U.S. Volunteers back to Fort Leavenworth. The regiment, including Dimon, was mustered out on November 27, 1865.

On January 13, 1866, President Andrew Johnson nominated Dimon for the award of the honorary grade of brevet brigadier general, U.S. Volunteers, to rank from March 13, 1865, for gallant and meritorious services and the U.S. Senate confirmed the award on March 12, 1866.

== Post-war life ==
Dimon's most notable position in civilian life was once again achieved through his connection to Benjamin Butler. In 1869, Butler founded the U.S. Cartridge Company in Lowell, Massachusetts, and secured major government contracts to produce small arms ammunition. Butler hired Dimon to manage the company in the mid-1870s and, under Dimon's direction, the company grew. By the 1880s it had a work force of approximately 250 and had expanded its operations to include the production of the "Lowell Battery Gun," a weapon similar to the Gatling gun.

Towards the end of his life, Dimon engaged in a political career, becoming the 37th mayor of Lowell in 1901. He died while holding that office in 1902 of throat cancer.

== See also ==
- List of Massachusetts generals in the American Civil War
- Massachusetts in the American Civil War

== Notes ==
Political offices
Preceded by Jeremiah Crowley	37th Mayor of Lowell, Massachusetts; 1901 – May 21, 1902	Succeeded by Charles E. Howe
