= Timothy Rourke =

Massachusetts politician (1952–1982)

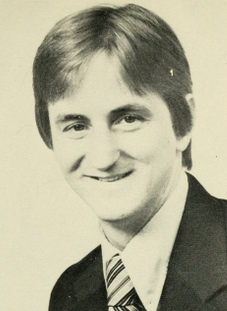

Member of the Massachusetts House of Representatives from the 19th Middlesex district
- In office 1981–1982
- Succeeded by: Susan F. Rourke

Personal details
- Born: Timothy Michael Rourke; October 21, 1952 Lowell, Massachusetts
- Died: April 17, 1982 (aged 29) Lowell, Massachusetts
- Parent: Raymond F. Rourke

Timothy Michael Rourke (October 21, 1952 – April 17, 1982) was an American Democratic politician from Lowell, Massachusetts. He represented the 19th Middlesex district in the Massachusetts House of Representatives from 1981 until his death the following year in an automobile accident.

He was the son of politician Raymond F. Rourke, who served in the state house and as Mayor of Lowell. He attended Keith Academy in Lowell and Lowell High School. He married Susan Fergola in 1973 and they had two children. At the time of his death, he was a night student at the University of Massachusetts Lowell studying for a bachelor's degree in criminal justice. His widow succeeded him in the Massachusetts House.
