= Raymond F. Rourke =

American politician

73rd Mayor of Lowell, Massachusetts
- In office 1978–1979
- Preceded by: Leo J. Farley
- Succeeded by: Robert C. Maguire

Member of the Lowell, Massachusetts City Council

Member of the Massachusetts House of Representatives 47th Middlesex District
- In office 1957–1975
- Preceded by: Patrick Plunkett
- Succeeded by: Edward A. LeLacheur

Personal details
- Born: Raymond Francis Rourke; October 10, 1917 Lowell, Massachusetts
- Died: May 24, 2004 (aged 86) Lowell, Massachusetts
- Resting place: St. Patrick's Cemetery, Lowell.
- Party: Democratic
- Spouse: Rita LaCoss
- Children: Raymond R. Rourke; Maureen A. Rourke; Arthur T. Rourke; Richard P. Rourke; John P. Rourke; Nancy L. Rourke; Timothy M. Rourke
- Education: St. Peter's Grammar School, Keith Academy, Lowell Commercial College
- Occupation: Firefighter

Military service
- Allegiance: (United States)
- Branch/service: U.S. Navy
- Rank: Petty officer third class
- Battles/wars: World War II

Raymond Francis Rourke (October 10, 1917 – May 24, 2004) was an American politician and firefighter who served for many years in the Massachusetts House of Representatives, and as the seventy third Mayor of Lowell, Massachusetts.

His son Timothy Rourke (1952–1982) and daughter-in-law Susan F. Rourke also served in the Massachusetts House of Representatives, representing Lowell.

Political offices
Preceded by Leo J. Farley	73rd Mayor of Lowell, Massachusetts; January 1, 1978 – 1979	Succeeded by Robert C. Maguire
