= Lipasti =

Lipasti is a surname. Notable people with the surname include:

- Irja Lipasti (1905–2000), Finnish sprinter
- Matias Lipasti (born 1997), Finnish wrestler
- Mikko Herman Lipasti, American engineer
