= Thomas J. Corbett =

American politician (1883–1967)

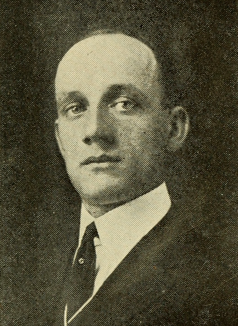
- Corbett as a member of the Massachusetts House of Representatives

Mayor of Lowell, Massachusetts
- In office 1927–1928
- Preceded by: John J. Donovan
- Succeeded by: Thomas H. Braden

Member of the Massachusetts House of Representatives from the 16th Middlesex District
- In office 1917–1922

Personal details
- Born: May 10, 1883 England
- Died: September 23, 1956 (aged 73) Lowell, Massachusetts, U.S.
- Party: Democratic

Thomas J. Corbett (May 10, 1883 – September 23, 1956) was an American politician who was a member of the Massachusetts House of Representatives from 1917 to 1922 and mayor of Lowell, Massachusetts from 1927 to 1928.

== Early life ==
Corbett was born in England on May 10, 1883. His family immigrated to the United States when Corbett was a boy and settled in Lowell's South End. He was educated in the Lowell Public Schools and worked in a mill before entering the trucking business.

== Politics ==
Corbett was a member of the Lowell common council in 1911. From 1917 to 1922, he represented the 16th Middlesex district in the Massachusetts House of Representatives.

In 1926, Corbett was one of five candidates in Lowell's non-partisan election for mayor. The election featured three candidates who had been members of the Lowell police department (incumbent mayor John J. Donovan and former mayor George H. Brown were former police officers and John W. Mahan was a patrolman). The two candidates without law enforcement experience, Corbett and Thomas H. Braden, received the most votes in the primary election and advanced to the runoff. Corbett won the runoff by 175 votes.

During his tenure, Corbett introduced an extensive street construction program. He and Congresswoman Edith Nourse Rogers also aided in the Lowell Airport project, which was spearheaded by Butler Ames. The airport opened on June 21, 1928. In 1928, Corbett lost his bid for reelection to Braden by 865 votes.

== Later life ==
After leaving office, Corbett served on Lowell's board of assessors and was head of the local state unemployment office. From 1936 to 1954, he was public relations officer for Harvard Brewing. He died on September 23, 1956 at his home in Lowell after a brief illness.
