= Perry D. Thompson =

American politician

Perry Daniel Thompson
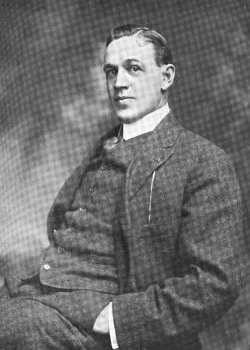

46th Mayor of Lowell, Massachusetts
- In office 1918–1921
- Preceded by: James E. O'Donnell
- Succeeded by: George Henry Brown

Member of the School Committee of Lowell, Massachusetts
- In office 1913–1914

Personal details
- Born: July 4, 1874 Lowell, Massachusetts
- Died: May 26, 1952 (aged 77) Billerica, Massachusetts
- Party: Republican
- Spouse: Alice W.
- Children: Perry G Thompson; Cynthia Thompson
- Education: Phillips Academy
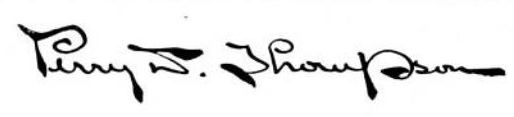
- Signature

Perry Daniel Thompson (July 4, 1874 – May 26, 1952) served as the forty-sixth mayor of Lowell, Massachusetts.

Thompson attended Lowell Public Schools and Phillips Academy. He was a member of the school committee from 1913 to 1914, mayor from 1918 to 1921, a member of the election committee in 1929, and city clerk from 1930 to 1945.

Political offices
Preceded by James E. O'Donnell	46th Mayor of Lowell, Massachusetts; 1918-1921	Succeeded by George Henry Brown
