= Charles A. Stott =

American politician

Charles Adams Stott

Chairperson of the Massachusetts Republican Party
- In office 1881–1883
- Preceded by: Eben F. Stone
- Succeeded by: Henry Cabot Lodge

24th Mayor of Lowell, Massachusetts
- In office January 1, 1876 – 1877
- Preceded by: Francis Jewett
- Succeeded by: John A.G. Richardson

Member of the Lowell, Massachusetts Board of Aldermen
- In office 1869–1870

Member of the Massachusetts House of Representatives
- In office 1866–1866

Member of the Lowell, Massachusetts Common Council Ward Six
- In office 1859–1860

Personal details
- Born: August 18, 1835 Dracut, Massachusetts
- Died: October 31, 1912 (aged 77) Lowell, Massachusetts
- Party: Republican
- Spouse(s): Mary E. Bean, d. December 1860; Lizzie Williams, m. December 3, 1863
- Children: Lilla A. Stott; Edith Stott; Charles W. Stott; Marion Stott

Military service
- Allegiance: (United States) Union
- Branch/service: Union Army
- Years of service: August 31, 1861 – June 3, 1862
- Rank: Major
- Commands: 6th Massachusetts Militia

Charles Adams Stott (August 18, 1835 – October 31, 1912) was a Massachusetts businessman who served in the Massachusetts House of Representatives; and as a member of the Common Council, Board of Aldermen, and the twenty-fourth mayor of Lowell, Massachusetts.

== Early life and education ==
Stott, the son of Charles and Sarah (MacAdams) Stott, was born on August 18, 1835 in the part of Dracut that was later set off to become Lowell. Stott received his education in the public schools of Lowell. Stott graduated from high school in Lowell.

== Family life ==
Stott married Mary E. Bean, daughter of George W. Bean of Lowell, and they had a daughter Lilla A. Stott. Mary (Bean) Stott died in December 1860. On December 3, 1863 Stott married Lizzie Williams, and they had four children including Edith Stott, Charles W. Stott, and Marion Stott.

== Military service ==
From August 31, 1861, to June 3, 1862, Stott actively served as a major in the 6th Regiment Massachusetts Volunteer Infantry.

== Public service ==
=== City of Lowell ===
Stott represented Lowell's ward Six as a member of the Lowell, Massachusetts Common Council in 1859 and 1860, and he was a member of the Lowell Board of Aldermen from 1869 to 1870.

==== Mayor of Lowell ====
From January 1, 1876 to January 1877 Stott served as the twenty-fourth mayor of Lowell, Massachusetts

=== Commonwealth of Massachusetts ===
Stott was a member of the Massachusetts House of Representatives in 1866.

== Party political office ==
From 1881 to 1883 Stott was the chairman of the Massachusetts Republican Party.

== 1884 U.S. Presidential election ==
In 1884 Stott was a presidential elector.

== Death ==
Stott died in Lowell, Massachusetts on October 31, 1912.

Political offices
Preceded by Francis Jewett	24th Mayor of Lowell, Massachusetts; January 1, 1876–1877	Succeeded by John A.G. Richardson
Party political offices
Preceded by Eben F. Stone	Chairman of the Massachusetts Republican Party; 1881–1883	Succeeded by Henry Cabot Lodge
