= John F. Meehan (politician) =

American politician (1875–1947)

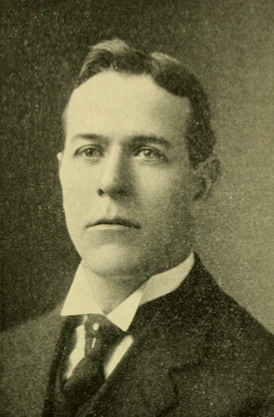
- Meehan as a member of the Massachusetts House of Representatives

Mayor of Lowell, Massachusetts
- In office 1910–1911
- Preceded by: George H. Brown
- Succeeded by: James E. O'Donnell

Member of the Massachusetts House of Representatives from the 15th Middlesex District
- In office 1907–1909

Personal details
- Born: September 29, 1875 Lowell, Massachusetts, U.S.
- Died: December 14, 1947 (aged 72) Lowell, Massachusetts, U.S.
- Party: Democratic
- Education: St. Bonaventure's College

John F. Meehan (November 24, 1875 – December 14, 1947) was an American politician who was a member of the Massachusetts House of Representatives from 1907 to 1909 and mayor of Lowell, Massachusetts from 1910 to 1911.

== Early life ==
Meehan was born in Lowell, Massachusetts on November 24, 1875. His parents, Patrick and Maraget (McDermott) Meehan, were natives of Sligo who came to Lowell in 1861. Meehan graduated from St. Patrick's Parochial School in 1890 and received his Bachelor of Arts from St. Bonaventure's College in 1895. He returned to Lowell and worked as a clerk for Smith & Company, a contractor. He also served as principal of Butler Night School for seven years.

== Politics ==
Meehan represented the 15th Middlesex district in the Massachusetts House of Representatives from 1907 to 1909.

Meehan was the Democratic nominee for mayor of Lowell in 1909. He defeated Republican incumbent George H. Brown by 498 votes. He was reelected in 1910, beating Brown by 556 votes.

In 1915, Meehan was appointed Postmaster of Lowell by president Woodrow Wilson. He succeeded Robert J. Crowley, who resigned to become deputy district attorney of Middlesex County, Massachusetts. He held this position until 1922.

== Personal life ==
On July 19, 1911, Meehan married Nellie Veronica Little. She died in 1921.

Meehan attended St. Patrick's Church and was a member of the Knights of Columbus, Benevolent and Protective Order of Elks, Fraternal Order of Eagles, and Ancient Order of Hibernians.

Meehan died on December 14, 1947, at his sister's home in Lowell. He was buried at Saint Patrick Cemetery in Lowell.
