= Joseph M. Downes =

American politician

65th Mayor of Lowell, Massachusetts
- In office 1962–1963
- Preceded by: Raymond J. Lord
- Succeeded by: Ellen A. Sampson

Member of the Lowell, Massachusetts City Council

Personal details
- Born: Lowell, Massachusetts
- Resting place: Tewksbury Cemetery
- Occupation: Police officer

Military service
- Allegiance: United States
- Branch/service: US Navy
- Battles/wars: World War II

Joseph M. Downes (died November 16, 1993) was an American politician. He was the sixty fifth Mayor of Lowell, Massachusetts.

Downes graduated from Lowell High School in 1937. Downes played baseball with the Boston Braves organization after his high school graduation.

During World War II Downes served in the Pacific on the USS Estes.

After World War II, beginning in 1946, Downes served for twenty years as a member of the Lowell police force.

Political offices
Preceded by Raymond J. Lord	36th Mayor of Lowell, Massachusetts; 1962-1963	Succeeded by Ellen A. Sampson
