= James E. O'Donnell =

American politician (1875–1966)

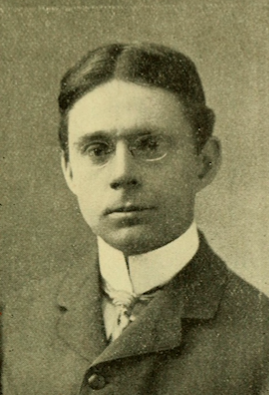
- O'Donnell as a member of the Massachusetts House of Representatives

Mayor of Lowell, Massachusetts
- In office 1916–1917
- Preceded by: Dennis J. Murphy
- Succeeded by: Perry D. Thompson
- In office 1912–1913
- Preceded by: John F. Meehan
- Succeeded by: Dennis J. Murphy

Member of the Massachusetts House of Representatives from the 17th Middlesex District
- In office 1907

Personal details
- Born: September 29, 1875 Chelmsford, Massachusetts, U.S.
- Died: September 15, 1966 (aged 90) Coral Gables, Florida, U.S.
- Party: Democratic
- Education: Boston University School of Law

James E. O'Donnell (September 29, 1875 – September 15, 1966) was an American jurist and politician who was a member of the Massachusetts House of Representatives in the 1908 Massachusetts legislature and mayor of Lowell, Massachusetts from 1912 to 1913 and 1916 to 1917.

== Early life ==
O'Donnell was born in Chelmsford, Massachusetts on September 29, 1875. He attended the Boston University School of Law and worked as a lawyer.

== Politics ==
O'Donnell's first run for political office came in 1907, when he sought the 17th Middlesex district seat in the Massachusetts House of Representatives. Running as a Democrat in a strong Republican district, he upset Louis P. Turcotte by 44 votes. In the 1908 Massachusetts Senate election, O'Donnell was a candidate in the Eighth Middlesex district. He lost to Republican incumbent Joseph H. Hibbard 50% to 47%.

In 1911, O'Donnell was a candidate for mayor in the city's first non-partisan election under the commission form of government. He defeated Percy Parker 7302 votes to 6340. He served as two year term and was defeated for reelection by Dennis J. Murphy 7,899 votes to 5,498. He challenged Murphy in the 1915 and defeated him by 333 votes.

In 1927, O'Donnell was appointed an associate justice of the Lowell District Court by Governor Alvan T. Fuller.

== Personal life and death ==
O'Donnell's first wife, Mary H. Murphy, died in 1930. He sold their home and moved to an apartment. On November 29, 1934, O'Donnell, 58, married his 25-year-old secretary, Gertrude Keene.

O'Donnell died on September 15, 1966 in Coral Gables, Florida. He was buried at Woodlawn Park in Miami.
