= Josiah B. French =

American politician

Josiah Bowers French

7th Mayor of Lowell, Massachusetts
- In office 1849–1850
- Preceded by: Jefferson Bancroft
- Succeeded by: James H.B. Ayer

Personal details
- Born: December 13, 1799
- Died: August 21, 1876 (aged 76)
- Party: Coalitionist
- Spouse(s): Mary Anne Stevens, m. April 6th 1823.
- Children: Mary Ann French, born September 19th 1823; Josiah Stevens French born 30 September 30th 1825; Harriet Stevens French, born 27 August 27th 1827; Josiah Bowers French born January 8th 1830; Samuel Lawrence French born September 25th 1832; Luther Bartlett French, born 25 October 25th 1834; Sarah Josephine French born March 3rd 1838; Catherine Isabella French, born December 20th 1840; Francis Maria French, born 20 April 20th 1843

Josiah Bowers French (December 13, 1799 – August 21, 1876) was a bank president who served as the seventh mayor of Lowell, Massachusetts.

== Family life ==
French married Mary Anne Stevens of Billerica, Massachusetts, on April 6, 1823; they had nine children: Mary Ann French, born September 19, 1823, Josiah Stevens French born September 30, 1825, Harriet Stevens French born August 27, 1827, Josiah Bowers French born January 8, 1830, Samuel Lawrence French born September 25, 1832, Luther Bartlett French born October 25, 1834, Sarah Josephine French born March 3, 1838, Catherine Isabella French born December 20, 1840, and Francis Maria French born April 20, 1843.

== Mayor of Lowell ==
French was elected mayor of Lowell in 1848; he was re-elected mayor in December 1849.

Political offices
Preceded by Jefferson Bancroft	7th Mayor of Lowell, Massachusetts; 1849-1850	Succeeded by James H.B. Ayer
