= List of mayors and city managers of Lowell, Massachusetts =

This is a list of mayors and city managers of Lowell, Massachusetts. Lowell became a city in 1836. From 1836 to 1943 the mayor of Lowell was the chief administrative officer of the city. Lowell switched to a Massachusetts "Plan E" form of city government in 1943, since January 1, 1944 the city has been administrated by a professional city manager, the office of mayor, while retained under "Plan E", is strictly a ceremonial one.

== Mayors ==
Mayor of Lowell
- Incumbent; Erik Gitschier since January 5, 2026
- Style: His/Her Honor
- Type: Ceremonial
- Member of: School Committee
- Residence: None official
- Seat: Lowell City Hall
- Appointer: City Council vote
- Term length: Two years
- Constituting instrument: Lowell City Charter
- Precursor: Lowell Board of Selectmen (1826-1836)
- Formation: 1836
- First holder: Elisha Bartlett
- Salary: $30,000 (2017)
- Website: www.lowellma.gov/549/City-Mayor

#	Mayor	Picture	Term	Party	Notes
1st	Elisha Bartlett		1836–1838	Whig	
2nd	Luther Lawrence		1838 – April 17, 1839	Federalist	
A	Elisha Huntington		April 1839 – April 1840	Whig	Became acting mayor after the death of Luther Lawrence in April 1839.
3rd	Elisha Huntington		April 1840 – April 1842	Whig	
4th	Nathaniel Wright		April 1842 – April 1844	Citizens ticket, (1842); Whig (1843)	
5th	Elisha Huntington		April 1844 – January 1846	Whig	
6th	Jefferson Bancroft		1846–1848	Whig	
7th	Josiah B. French		1849–1850	Coalitionist/Democratic	
8th	James H.B. Ayer		1851	Whig	
9th	Elisha Huntington		January 1852 – January 1853	Whig	
10th	Sewall G. Mack		1853–1854	Whig	
11th	Ambrose Lawrence		1855	Native American Party	
12th	Elisha Huntington		1856	Whig	
13th	Stephen Mansur		1857	Republican	
14th	Elisha Huntington		January 1858 – January 1859	Whig	
15th	James Cook		1859	Republican	
16th	Benjamin C. Sargent		1860–1861	Republican	
17th	Hocum Hosford		1862–1865	Citizens ticket (1862–1863), Republican (1864)	
18th	Josiah G. Peabody		1865–1866	Republican	
19th	George F. Richardson		1867 – January 4, 1869	Republican	
20th	Jonathan P. Folsom		January 4, 1869 – 1870	Republican	
21st	Edward Fay Sherman		1871	Republican	
22nd	Josiah G. Peabody		1872	Republican	
23rd	Francis Jewett		1873–1875	Republican	
24th	Charles A. Stott		January 1, 1876 – 1877	Republican	
25th	John A. G. Richardson		January 7, 1878 – 1879	Democratic	
26th	Frederic T. Greenhalge		1880 – January 2, 1882	Republican	
27th	George Runels		January 2, 1882	Republican	
28th	John J. Donovan		1883–1884	Democratic	First Irish-American Mayor of Lowell
29th	Edward J. Noyes		1885	Republican	
30th	James C. Abbott		1886–1887	Democratic	
31st	Charles Dana Palmer		1888 – January 1891	Republican	
32nd	George W. Fifield		January 1891 – 1892	Democratic	
33rd	John J. Pickman		1893–1894	Republican	
34th	William F. Courtney		1895–1897	Democratic	
35th	Col. James W. Bennett		1898	Republican	
36th	Jeremiah Crowley		1899–1900	Democratic	Irish-American
37th	Charles A. R. Dimon		1901 – May 5, 1902	Democratic	
A	William E. Badger		1902	Republican	Acting
38th	Charles E. Howe		1903–1904	Republican	
39th	James B. Casey		1905–1906	Democratic	Irish-American
40th	Frederick W. Farnham		1907–1908	Republican	
41st	George H. Brown		January 1, 1909-January, 1910	Republican	
42nd	John F. Meehan		1910–1911	Democratic	Irish-American
43rd	James E. O'Donnell		1912–1913	Democratic	Irish-American
44th	Dennis J. Murphy		1914–1915	Democratic	Irish-American
45th	James E. O'Donnell		1916–1917	Democratic	
46th	Perry D. Thompson		1918–1921	Republican	
47th	George H. Brown		1922	Republican	
48th	John J. Donovan		1923–1926	Democratic	
49th	Thomas J. Corbett		1927–1928	Democratic	
50th	Thomas H. Braden		1929–1931	Republican	
52nd	Charles H. Slowey		1932–1933	Democratic	
53rd	James J. Bruin		1934–1935	Democratic	
54th	Dewey G. Archambault		1936–1939	Republican	First Franco-American Mayor of Lowell
55th	George T. Ashe		1940–1943	Democratic	
A	Joseph J. Sweeney		1943	Democratic	Acting mayor. Last mayor before the City Manager form of government was established under a Massachusetts Plan E Charter.
56th	Woodbury F. Howard		1944–1945	Republican	First ceremonial mayor. Beginning of the weak mayor system. City manager form of government established on January 1, 1944.
57th	Leo A. Roy		1946–1947	Republican	
58th	George A. Ayotte		1948–1949	Republican	
59th	William C. Geary		1950	Democratic	
60th	George C. Eliades		1951–1952	Democratic	First Greek-American Mayor of Lowell
61st	Henry Beaudry		1952–1953	Republican	
62nd	John Janas		1954–1955	Republican	First Polish-American Mayor of Lowell
63rd	Samuel S. Pollard		1956–1959	Democratic	
64th	Raymond J. Lord		1960–1961	Republican	
65th	Joseph M. Downes		1962–1963	Democratic	
66th	Ellen A. Sampson		1964–1965	Republican	First Female Mayor of Lowell
67th	Edward J. Early Jr.		1966–1967	Democratic	
68th	Robert G. Maguire		1968–1969	Democratic	
69th	Richard P. Howe		1970–1971	Democratic	
70th	Ellen A. Sampson		1972–1973	Republican	
71st	Armand W. LeMay		1974–1975	Democratic	
72nd	Leo J. Farley		1976–1977	Democratic	
73rd	Raymond F. Rourke		1978–1979	Democratic	
74th	Robert C. Maguire		1980–1981	Democratic	
75th	M. Brendan Fleming		1982–1983	Democratic	
76th	Brian J. Martin		1984–1985	Democratic	
77th	Robert B. Kennedy		1986–1987	Democratic	
78th	Richard P. Howe		1988–1991	Democratic	
79th	Tarsy T. Poulios		1992–1993	Democratic	
80th	Richard P. Howe		1994–1995	Democratic	
81st	Edward "Bud" Caulfield		1996–1997		
82nd	Eileen Donoghue		1998–2001	Democratic	
83rd	Rita Mercier		2002–2003	Democratic	
84th	Armand Mercier		2004–2005		
85th	William F. Martin		2006–2007	Democratic	
86th	Edward "Bud" Caulfield		2008–2009	Democratic	
87th	James L. Milinazzo		2010–2011	Democratic	Italian-American
88th	Patrick O. Murphy		2012–2013	Independent	Inaugurated at age 29, youngest mayor in Lowell history
89th	Rodney Elliott		2014–2016	Democratic	
90th	Edward J. Kennedy		2016–2018	Democratic	
91st	William Samaras		2018–2020	Democratic	
92nd	John Leahy		2020–2022	Independent	
93rd	Sokhary Chau		2022-2024	Democratic	First Cambodian mayor in the United States.
94th	Daniel Rourke		2024–2026		
95th	Erik Gitschier		2026-present		

== City Managers ==
#	City Manager	Term	Notes
1st	John J. Flannery	1944–1952	
2nd	Ulysses J. Lupien	1952–1953	former Massachusetts Director of Civil Service (1939–1944)
A	William Sullivan	1953	
3rd	Frank E. Barrett	1953–1962	
4th	Cornelius Desmond	1962–1963	former State Representative (1941–1962)
5th	P. Harold Ready	1963–1966	
6th	Charles Gallagher	1966–1970	
A	Leo Morris	1970	
7th	James Sullivan	1970–1974	former and future City Manager of Cambridge, Massachusetts (1968–1970, 1974–1981)
A	Robert W. Healy	1974	future City Manager of Cambridge, Massachusetts (1981–2013)
8th	Paul J. Sheehy	1974–1975	former State Representative (1965–1972)
A	William Busby	1975	
9th	William S. Taupier	1975–1979	former Mayor of Holyoke (1968–1975)
A	Victor Normand	1979	
10th	B. Joseph Tully	1979–1987	former State Senator (1971–1979)
11th	James Campbell	1987–1991	
A	James Kennedy	1991	Assistant City Manager
12th	Richard Johnson	1991–1995	former Mayor of Taunton (1982–1992)
13th	Brian J. Martin	1995–2000	former Mayor (1984–1985)
14th	John F. Cox	2000–2006	former State Representative (1983–1995)
A	James Kennedy	2006	Assistant City Manager
15th	Bernard F. Lynch	2006–2014	1st Town Manager of Chelmsford (1989–2006)
A	Michael Geary	2014	City Clerk (Dec. 2011-present) & former City Councilor (1994–1996)
16th	Kevin J. Murphy	2014–2018	former State Representative (1997–2014)
17th	Eileen Donoghue	2018–2022	former Mayor (1998–2002) & State Senator (2011–2018)
A	Michael Geary	2022	City Clerk (Dec. 2011-present) & former City Councilor (1994–1996)
18th	Thomas Golden Jr.	2022–present	former State Representative (1995–2022)
