= Armand Mercier =

American politician

Armand P. Mercier

83rd Mayor of Lowell, Massachusetts
- In office January 2004 – January 2006
- Preceded by: Rita Mercier
- Succeeded by: William F. Martin

Member of the Lowell, Massachusetts City Council
- In office January 1998 – January 2010

Personal details
- Born: November 8, 1933 Lowell, Massachusetts
- Died: January 13, 2012 (aged 78) Lowell, Massachusetts
- Profession: Real estate

Armand P. Mercier (November 8, 1933 – January 13, 2012) was a mayor and city councillor of Lowell, Massachusetts.

== Early life and career ==
Mercier was born in Lowell on November 8, 1933, to the late Peter and Lillian (Rodrigue) Mercier. He was a student of St. Joseph High School, and a lifelong resident of Lowell. He was a long-time member of the former Ste. Jeanne d'Arc Church in the Pawtucketville Section, and also founded Mercier Realty in 1985.

His public service career began in 1966 as the labor appointee to the Lowell Public Housing Board of Commissioners as the Governor's Representative for the Lowell Public Housing. He served as Chairman, Vice-Chairman, Commissioner and Executive Director of the Lowell Housing Authority, as well as Development Director and Executive Director of the Lowell Historical Preservation Commission. He also served on the Lowell Plan of Directors; Community Teamwork Incorporated (CTI); Center Cities Committee, Vice President of the Massachusetts Chapter of the National Association of Housing Redevelopment (NAHRO); Board of Director of the Jeanne D’Arc Credit Union, Chair of the Greater Lowell March of Dimes and Delegate of the Central Labor Council. In 1975 he was a finalist for the position Lowell City Manager. The city council chose Holyoke Mayor William Taupier over Mercier and the other finalist, Robert W. Healy, after sixteen ballots.

== Lowell City Council ==
Mercier served six terms on the Lowell City Council from 1998 to 2010. During this time, he served one term as vice mayor (2002–2004), and one term as mayor (2004–2006). He served on numerous subcommittees including Economic Development and Downtown, Public Safety, and Zoning. In the 2009 Lowell City election Mercier lost his reelection bid by 217 votes.

== Post council ==
The Lowell Housing Authority has named their community building on Salem Street the Armand P. Mercier Multi-Service Center, in his honor.

In 2011, Mercier tried to reclaim his seat on the council, but lost by 55 votes. He died on January 13, 2012, at Lowell General Hospital following a brief illness.

Political offices
| Preceded by Rita Mercier | 83rd Mayor of Lowell, Massachusetts; January 2004—January 2006 | Succeeded by William F. Martin |
