= Paul J. Sheehy =

American politician

Member of the Massachusetts Senate from the First Middlesex District
- In office 1985–1991
- Preceded by: Philip L. Shea
- Succeeded by: Nancy A. Sullivan

City Manager of Lowell, Massachusetts
- In office 1974–1975
- Preceded by: James Sullivan
- Succeeded by: William Taupier

Personal details
- Born: Paul Joseph Sheehy; November 1, 1934 Lowell, Massachusetts
- Died: March 10, 2014 (aged 79)
- Party: Democratic
- Education: Lowell State College; Suffolk University Law School
- Occupation: Attorney; Politician; City Manager

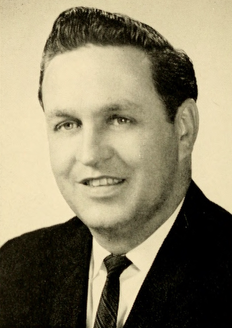
Paul J. Sheehy

Paul Joseph Sheehy (November 1, 1934 – March 10, 2014) was an American politician who served in the Massachusetts House of Representatives, Massachusetts Senate and was City Manager of Lowell, Massachusetts.

Sheehy was born in Lowell. He attended Keith Academy, Lowell State College, and Suffolk University Law School.

From 1965 to 1972 he was a member of the Massachusetts House of Representatives. In 1972 he ran for the Massachusetts's 5th congressional district seat vacated by F. Bradford Morse. He finished second in the nine candidate Democratic primary, losing to John Kerry 27.56% to 20.75%. From 1971 to 1973 he served as director of the Lowell Bank and Trust Co.

In 1974, Sheehy was named city manager of Lowell. He resigned his post on September 5, 1975, after he was convicted of bank fraud and three counts of making false statements in Lowell Bank and Trust Co.'s books. He was sentenced to 60 days in prison and lost his license to practice law.

During the late 1970s and early 1980s, Sheehy worked in the offices of Congressmen James M. Shannon and Joseph D. Early.

In 1984 he was elected to the Massachusetts Senate. He served three terms before losing to Republican Nancy A. Sullivan in 1990.

Sheehy died on March 10, 2014.
