= Senator Tully =

Senator Tully may refer to:

- B. Joseph Tully (1927–2015), Massachusetts State Senate
- Michael J. Tully Jr. (1933–1997), New York State Senate
- William J. Tully (1870–1930), New York State Senate
