= Edward J. Early Jr. =

American politician (1931–2023)

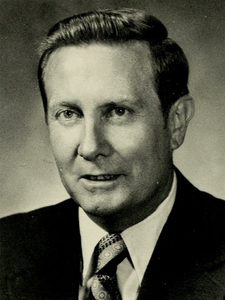

Register of Deeds for the Middlesex Northern district
- In office 1977–1995
- Preceded by: Frederick J. Finnegan
- Succeeded by: Richard P. Howe

Member of the Massachusetts House of Representatives
- In office 1973–1977
- Preceded by: John J. Desmond
- Succeeded by: Leo J. Farley

Mayor of Lowell, Massachusetts
- In office 1966–1967
- Preceded by: Ellen A. Sampson
- Succeeded by: Robert G. Maguire

Personal details
- Born: July 23, 1931 Lowell, Massachusetts, U.S.
- Died: September 4, 2023 (aged 92)
- Party: Democratic
- Education: Boston College; Suffolk University Law School

Edward J. Early Jr. (July 23, 1931 – September 4, 2023) was an American lawyer and politician who served as mayor of Lowell, Massachusetts, state representative, and Middlesex Northern Register of Deeds.

== Early life ==
Early was born on July 23, 1931, in Lowell. He attended the Keith Academy, Boston College, and Suffolk University Law School.

== Political career ==
Early began his political career as a member of the Lowell city council. From 1966 to 1967, he also served as mayor, a ceremonial position as the city is administrated by a professional city manager. From 1973 to 1977, Early was a member of the Massachusetts House of Representatives. In 1976 he was elected Register of Deeds for the Middlesex Northern district. He was reelected without opposition in 1982 and 1988.

== Death ==
Early died at home on September 4, 2023, at the age of 92.
