= George H. Brown (Lowell mayor) =

American politician

George Henry Brown

47th Mayor of Lowell, Massachusetts
- In office 1922–1922
- Preceded by: Perry D. Thompson
- Succeeded by: John J. Donovan

Commissioner of Finance Lowell, Massachusetts
- In office January 1914 – December 31, 1918
- Preceded by: Frederick W. Farnham
- Succeeded by: John F. Meehan

Commissioner of Streets and Highways Lowell, Massachusetts
- In office January 1912 – January 1914

41st Mayor of Lowell, Massachusetts
- In office January 1, 1909 – January 1910
- Preceded by: Frederick W. Farnham
- Succeeded by: John F. Meehan

Personal details
- Born: May 22, 1877 Waterville, Maine
- Died: March 3, 1950
- Resting place: Edson Cemetery, Lowell, Massachusetts
- Party: Republican
- Spouse: Emma Vining

Military service
- Allegiance: United States
- Years of service: 1898; 7-31-1899-May 1901
- Rank: Private; Sergeant
- Commands: Company N, Ninth Regiment Massachusetts Volunteers; Company I, Twenty Sixth Regiment United States Volunteer Infantry
- Battles/wars: Spanish–American War, Philippine–American War

George Henry Brown (May 22, 1877 – March 3, 1950) was a politician who served as the forty first, and forty seventh Mayor of Lowell, Massachusetts.

Brown was born on May 22, 1877, in Waterville, Maine.

Brown married Emma Vining on October 5, 1904, in Lowell, Massachusetts.

Political offices
Preceded by Frederick W. Farnham	41st Mayor of Lowell, Massachusetts; January 1, 1909-January, 1910	Succeeded by John F. Meehan
Preceded by Perry D. Thompson	47th Mayor of Lowell, Massachusetts; 1922–1922	Succeeded by John J. Donovan
