= Jefferson Bancroft =

American politician

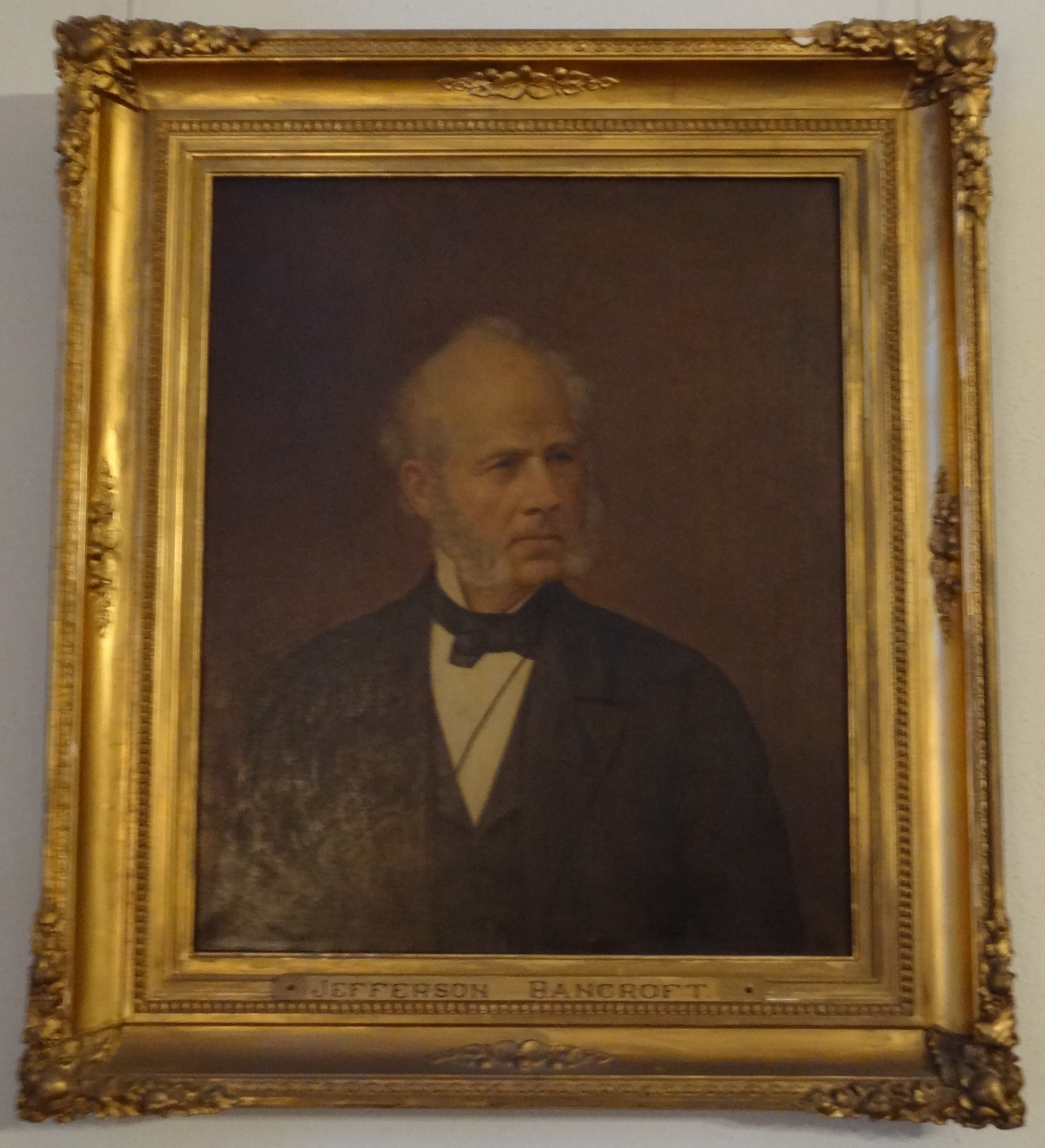

6th Mayor of Lowell, Massachusetts
- In office 1846–1848
- Preceded by: Elisha Huntington
- Succeeded by: Josiah B. French

Member of the Lowell, Massachusetts Board of Aldermen
- In office 1841–1842

Member of the Lowell, Massachusetts City Council
- In office 1839–1840

Personal details
- Born: April 30, 1803 Warwick, Massachusetts
- Died: January 3, 1890 (aged 86) Tyngsborough, Massachusetts
- Party: Whig
- Occupation: Farmer, Deputy Sheriff

Jefferson Bancroft (April 30, 1803 – January 3, 1890) was a farmer and politician who served as the sixth Mayor of Lowell, Massachusetts.

Bancroft was born on April 30, 1803, in Warwick, Massachusetts.

From 1831 to his death in 1890 Bancroft was a Deputy Sheriff of Middlesex County.

Bancroft was a member of the Lowell City Council in 1839 and 1840, and a member of the Lowell Board of Aldermen from 1841 and 1842.

== Massachusetts House of Representatives ==
Beginning in 1840 Bancroft served four terms in the Massachusetts House representing Lowell. While in the Massachusetts House Bancroft sat as a member of the Whig Party.

== Death ==
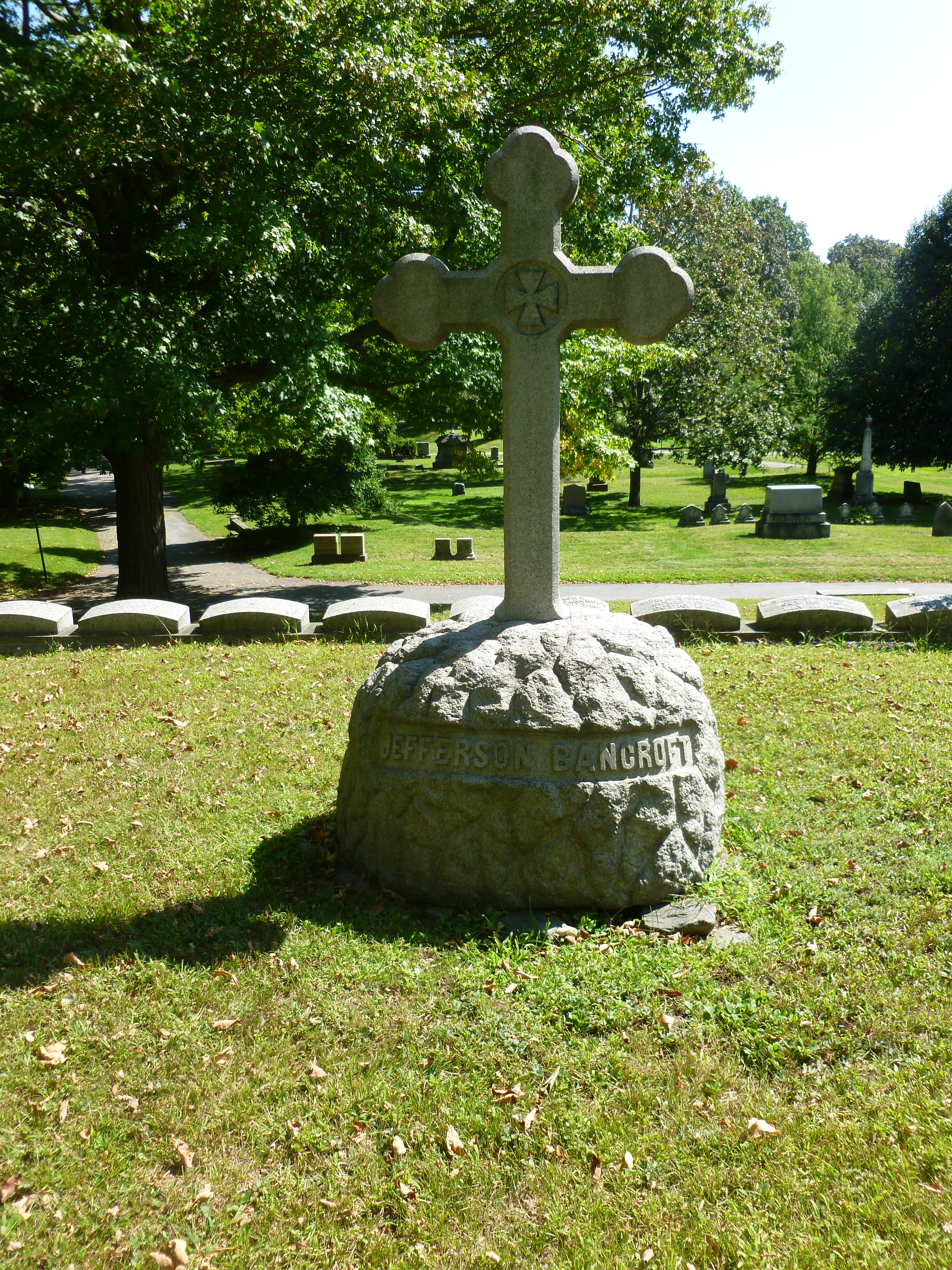
Gravestone among the Bancroft family lot in Lowell Cemetery

Bancroft died on January 3, 1890, at his farm in Tyngborough, Massachusetts. He is buried in Lowell Cemetery.

Political offices
Preceded by Elisha Huntington	6th Mayor of Lowell, Massachusetts; 1846–1848	Succeeded by Josiah B. French
