= James Sullivan (city manager) =

American city manager

City Manager of Cambridge, Massachusetts
- In office 1974–1981
- Preceded by: John H. Corcoran
- Succeeded by: Robert W. Healy
- In office 1968–1970
- Preceded by: Joseph DeGuglielmo
- Succeeded by: John H. Corcoran

City Manager of Lowell, Massachusetts
- In office 1970–1974
- Preceded by: Charles Gallagher
- Succeeded by: Paul J. Sheehy

Personal details
- Born: December 11, 1925 Somerville, Massachusetts
- Died: September 26, 2012 (aged 86) Plainsboro Township, New Jersey
- Party: Democratic
- Spouse: Anne
- Children: Maura, Mark, Lianne, Christopher
- Education: Boston College
- Occupation: City Manager; Chamber of Commerce President

James Leo Sullivan (December 11, 1925 – September 26, 2012) was an American city manager who served as City Manager of Cambridge, Massachusetts, from 1968 to 1970 and again 1974 to 1981. In between his stints as Cambridge City Manager, Sullivan was City Manager of Lowell, Massachusetts. He also served as President of the Greater Boston Chamber of Commerce.

== Early life and career ==
Sullivan was born and raised in Somerville, Massachusetts, to James Christopher Sullivan and Anna Agnes (Kilmartin) Sullivan. His father died when he was five and his mother had to work to support the family. Sullivan was cared for by his grandparents, Patrick J. and Anna (Kelly) Kilmartin, originally of Doolin in County Clare, Ireland. He attended St. John's High School in North Cambridge.

In November 1943 Sullivan enlisted in the United States Navy. He completed radio school in Boston and was assigned as Radioman Second Class on the USS Runels. After the atomic bombing of Nagasaki, Sullivan was one of several men sent ashore to evacuate Allied prisoners of war from Japanese camps.

Following his honorable discharge, Sullivan enrolled at Boston College under the GI bill. He graduated in 1950 with a degree in history and government and later earned a master's degree in administration and finance. After graduating, he worked for the Social Security Administration in Willimantic, Connecticut. In 1951, he returned to Somerville after he married his wife, Anne. For the next six years, he taught history and government in the Somerville Public School system. He supplemented his teacher's salary by working for the Parks and Recreation Department during the summer and driving a cab.

In 1957, Sullivan entered public administration when Arlington, Massachusetts, town manager Edward Monaghan appointed him assistant town manager. In 1962, he was chosen as the first Town Manager in Watertown, Connecticut. He was chosen because the selection committee believed he had the "perfect temperament" to manage the town. In 1966, he moved to Milton, Massachusetts, to become executive secretary of that town.

== First stint in Cambridge ==
On June 24, 1968, the Cambridge City Council voted 5–4 to appoint Sullivan city manager. He was chosen after a six-month search in which 77 applications were sent in from across the country. Sullivan was chosen by the City Council even though he did not apply for the job. He took office on July 15.

On May 22, 1970, the City Council voted to consider at its next meeting a motion to fire Sullivan. After the motion passed, Cambridge citizens organized a grassroots committee called SOC'M (Save Our City Manager) to oppose firing Sullivan. On June 1, 1970, the City Council voted 5–4 to suspend Sullivan from office. The meeting was attended by 300 to 400 citizens who were mostly pro-Sullivan. He was given a public hearing on June 11 in which he was allowed to respond to the council's reasons for firing him. It was attended by 1200 people, most of whom were members of SOC'M.

== Lowell ==
In October 1970, Sullivan was named City Manager of Lowell, Massachusetts. Although he had pledged to not take any other jobs until a referendum was held in Cambridge to determine whether or not he should be reinstated there, Sullivan was convinced by Lowell City Councilor Paul Tsongas to take the job in Lowell.

During his tenure in Lowell, Sullivan stabilized the city's tax rate. He also survived a referendum that would eliminate the city manager position, with 83% voting against eliminating the position.

He resigned as city manager in February 1974 to return to Cambridge. He was offered $45,000 by the Cambridge City Council to accept the position of city manager there while the Lowell Council could not offer more than $30,000 due to legislation that put a salary ceiling in place. Prior to his departure, Sullivan recommended that his assistant city manager, Robert W. Healy, be chosen as his successor. The city council instead chose former state representative Paul J. Sheehy and Healy accepted the assistant city manager's job in Cambridge.

== Return to Cambridge ==
Sullivan returned to Cambridge on April 1, 1974. Upon taking office, he promised to shake up the city's housing authority and police department.

During his second stint in Cambridge, Sullivan was one of the most outspoken opponents of Proposition 2½. He also dealt with paraquat-contaminated marijuana, a murder inside a school, genetic engineering studies, and the hanging of political signs in the city square. In an effort to increase revenue, Sullivan launched a program to acquire back taxes owed to Cambridge. Delinquent taxpayers netted by the program included the mayor and his brother.

On May 18, 1981, Sullivan announced his resignation effective July 1 to become president of the Greater Boston Chamber of Commerce (GBCC). Prior to accepting the job with the GBCC, Sullivan was considered for the position of general manager of the Massachusetts Bay Transportation Authority.

== Greater Boston Chamber of Commerce ==
Sullivan became President of the GBBC on July 1, 1981. He was the Chamber's first full-time executive president. Previously the job was a volunteer position held by a businessman for one or two years.

Sullivan retired on December 31, 1991. He was succeeded by William B. Coughlin, president of the Artery Business Committee which merged with the Chamber earlier that year.

== Death ==
Sullivan died on September 26, 2012, at the University Medical Center of Princeton at Plainsboro.
