= Eben F. Stone =

American politician

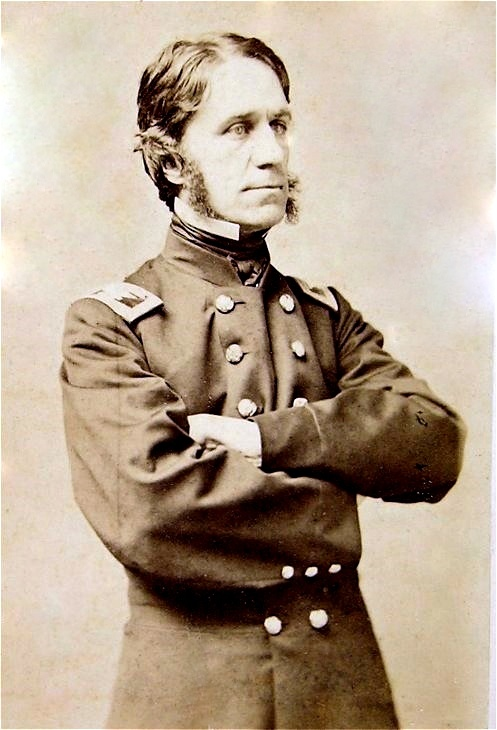
- Stone in 1862

Member of the U.S. House of Representatives from Massachusetts
- In office March 4, 1881 – March 3, 1887
- Preceded by: George B. Loring
- Succeeded by: William Cogswell
- Constituency: 6th district (1881–83); 7th district (1883–87)

Chair of the Massachusetts Republican Party
- In office 1879–1880
- Preceded by: Adin Thayer
- Succeeded by: Charles A. Stott

11th Mayor of Newburyport
- In office 1867–1867
- Preceded by: William Graves
- Succeeded by: Nathaniel Pierce

Member of the Massachusetts Senate for the 4th Essex district
- In office 1857–1858
- In office 1861–1861

President of the Newburyport Common Council
- In office June 24, 1851 – January, 1852
- Preceded by: New office

Member of the Newburyport Common Council for Ward 4
- In office June 16, 1851 – January, 1852
- Preceded by: New office

Personal details
- Born: Eben Francis Stone; August 3, 1822 Newburyport, Massachusetts, USA
- Died: January 22, 1895 (aged 72) Newburyport, Massachusetts, USA
- Resting place: Oak Hill Cometary
- Party: Republican
- Spouse(s): Harriet Perrin, (d. December 31, 1889)
- Children: Frances (Fanny) Coolidge Stone
- Education: Harvard University
- Profession: Attorney

Military service
- Allegiance: United States of America; Union
- Branch/service: Union Army
- Years of service: 1862 – September 3, 1863
- Rank: Colonel
- Commands: 48th Massachusetts Infantry Regiment
- Battles/wars: American Civil War: Battle of Plains Store; Siege of Port Hudson

Eben Francis Stone (August 3, 1822 – January 22, 1895) was an American lawyer, veteran of the Civil War, and politician who served three terms as a U.S. representative from Massachusetts from 1881 to 1887.

== Biography ==
Stone was born in Newburyport, Massachusetts to Ebenezer and Fanny (Coolidge) Stone.

Stone attended North Andover Academy and graduated from Harvard University in 1843 and from Harvard Law School in 1846. He was admitted to the bar in 1847 and commenced practice in Newburyport, Massachusetts.

=== Early career ===
He served as president of the common council in 1851.

He served in the Massachusetts Senate in 1857, 1858, and 1861.

=== Civil War ===
Stone enlisted in the Union Army during the Civil War, and commanded the 48th Regiment Massachusetts Volunteer Infantry of the Massachusetts Volunteer Militia. He achieved the rank of colonel.

=== Return to politics ===
Stone served as the eleventh mayor of Newburyport in 1867. Stone served as member of the Massachusetts House of Representatives in 1867, 1877, 1878, and 1880.

=== Congress ===
Stone was elected as a Republican to the Forty-seventh, Forty-eighth, and Forty-ninth Congresses (March 4, 1881 – March 3, 1887). He was not a candidate for renomination in 1886.

=== Later career and death ===
He resumed the practice of law in Newburyport, Massachusetts, where he died January 22, 1895. Stone was interred in Oak Hill Cemetery.

== See also ==
- 1877 Massachusetts legislature
- 1878 Massachusetts legislature

== Notes ==
U.S. House of Representatives
Preceded by George B. Loring	Member of the U.S. House of Representatives from Massachusetts's 6th congressional district March 4, 1881 – March 3, 1883	Succeeded by Henry B. Lovering
Preceded by William A. Russell	Member of the U.S. House of Representatives from Massachusetts's 7th congressional district March 4, 1883 – March 3, 1887	Succeeded by William Cogswell
Political offices
Preceded by William Graves	Mayor of Newburyport, Massachusetts; 1867–1867	Succeeded by Nathaniel Pierce
Preceded by None	Member of the Newburyport, Massachusetts; Common Council; June 24, 1851 – January, 1852	Succeeded by
Preceded by None	President of the Newburyport, Massachusetts; Common Council; June 24, 1851 – January, 1852	Succeeded by
Preceded by	Member of the Massachusetts House of Representatives	Succeeded by
