= Jeremiah Crowley (politician) =

American politician

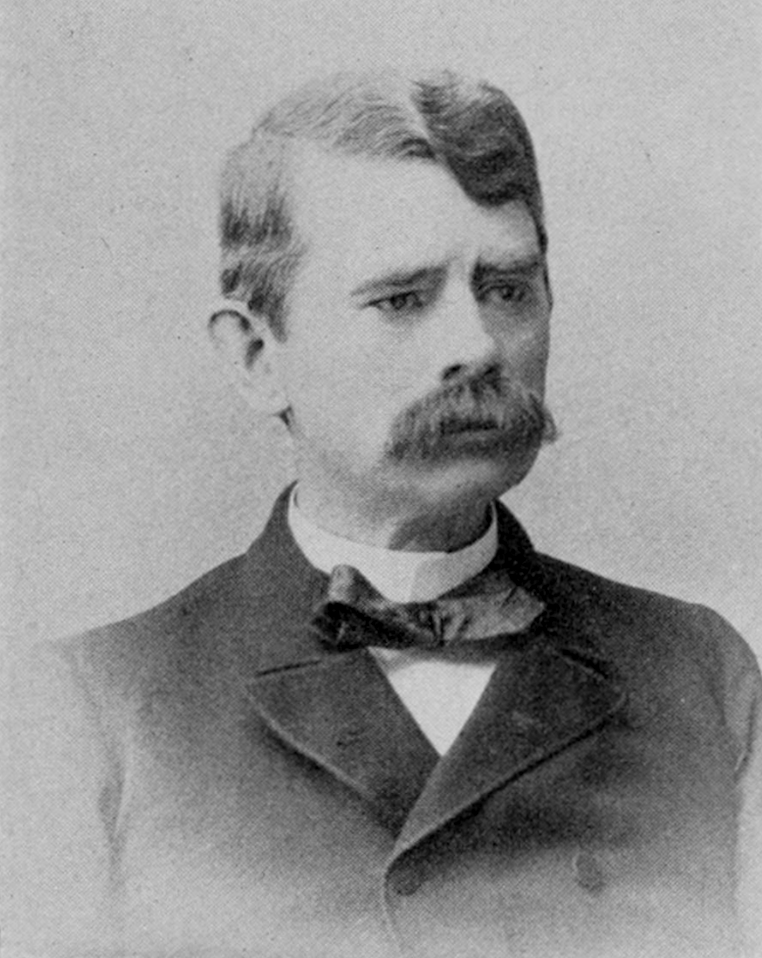

36th Mayor of Lowell, Massachusetts
- In office 1899–1900
- Preceded by: James W. Bennett
- Succeeded by: Charles A.R. Dimon

Member of the Massachusetts Senate
- In office 1881–1882

Member of the Lowell, Massachusetts Board of Aldermen
- In office 1870–1871

Member of the Lowell, Massachusetts Board of Aldermen
- In office 1873–1874

Member of the Lowell, Massachusetts Board of Aldermen
- In office 1877–1878

Member of the Lowell, Massachusetts Board of Aldermen
- In office 1884–1884

Member of the Lowell, Massachusetts Board of Aldermen
- In office 1891–1891

Member of the Lowell, Massachusetts Common Council Ward Five
- In office 1868–1869

Personal details
- Born: January 12, 1832
- Died: September 23, 1901 (aged 69) Lowell, Massachusetts
- Party: Democratic
- Occupation: Attorney

Military service
- Allegiance: (United States) Union
- Branch/service: Union Army
- Years of service: 1861
- Battles/wars: American Civil War

Jeremiah Crowley (January 12, 1832 – September 23, 1901) served as the thirty sixth Mayor of Lowell, Massachusetts.

== See also ==
- 103rd Massachusetts General Court (1882)

Political offices
Preceded by James W. Bennett	36th Mayor of Lowell, Massachusetts; 1899-1900	Succeeded by Charles A.R. Dimon
