= Leo J. Farley =

American politician

Member of the Massachusetts House of Representatives from the 44th Middlesex district
- In office 1977–1979
- Preceded by: Edward J. Early Jr.
- Succeeded by: District eliminated

Mayor of Lowell, Massachusetts
- In office 1975–1976
- Preceded by: Armand W. Lemay
- Succeeded by: Raymond F. Rourke

Personal details
- Born: June 1, 1926 Lowell, Massachusetts
- Died: July 14, 1984 (aged 58) Lowell, Massachusetts
- Party: Democratic

Leo J. Farley Jr. (June 1, 1926 – July 14, 1984) was an American politician who served as Mayor of Lowell, Massachusetts and was a member of the Massachusetts House of Representatives.

== Early life ==
Farley was born on June 1, 1926, in Lowell. He grew up in Lowell and graduated from Lowell High School.

== Political career ==
From 1970 to 1977, Farley was a member of the Lowell city council. From 1975 to 1976, he also served as Mayor, a ceremonial position in which the city was administrated by a professional city manager. From 1977 to 1979, Farley represented the 44th Middlesex district in the Massachusetts House of Representatives.

== Death ==
Farley died on July 14, 1984, in Lowell.
