= Ambrose Lawrence =

American politician

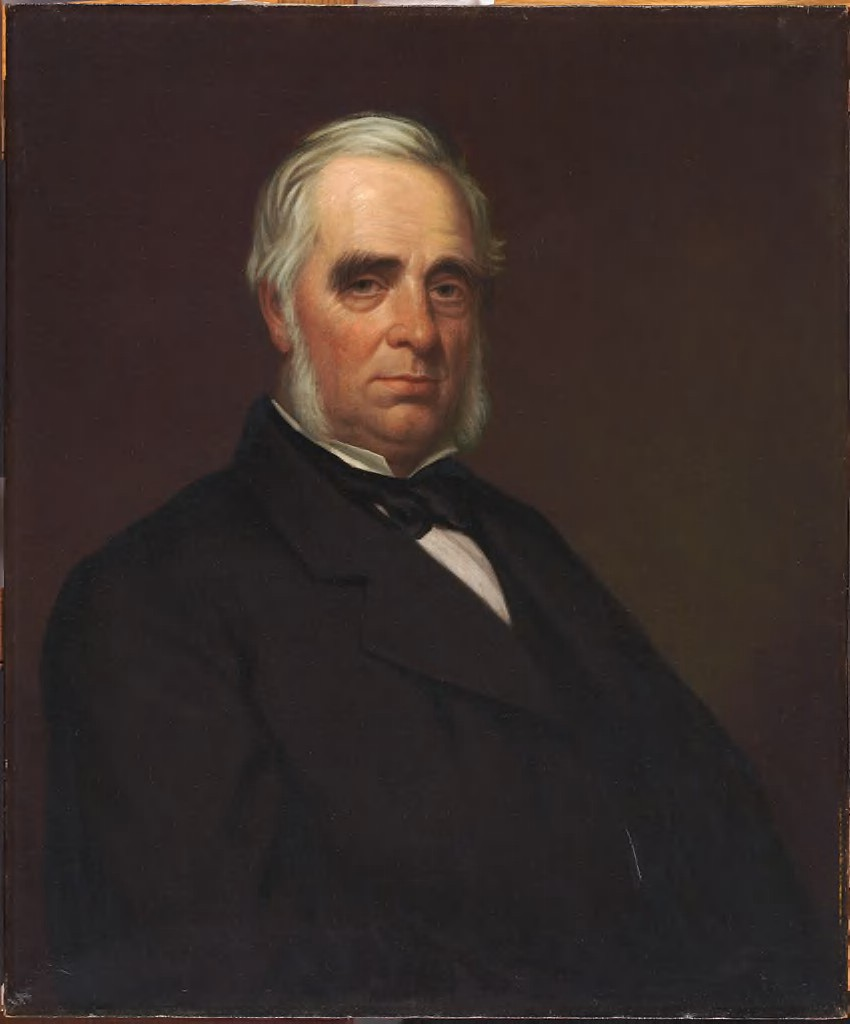
- Portrait by Thomas B. Lawson, 1876

11th Mayor of Lowell, Massachusetts
- In office 1855–1855
- Preceded by: Sewall G. Mack
- Succeeded by: Elisha Huntington

Member of the Lowell, Massachusetts Board of Aldermen
- In office 1851–1851

Member of the Lowell, Massachusetts Common Council
- In office 1849–1849

Personal details
- Born: 1816 Boscawen, New Hampshire
- Died: 1893 (aged 76–77)
- Profession: Dentist

Ambrose Lawrence (1816-1893) was a dentist who served as the eleventh mayor of Lowell, Massachusetts.

Lawrence was elected mayor in December 1854 as a member of the Know Nothings. He had previously been a member of the Whig Party. He was also a member of the Independent Order of Odd Fellows, serving as Grand Patriarch for Massachusetts during the 1880s.

Political offices
Preceded by Sewall G. Mack	11th Mayor of Lowell, Massachusetts; 1855-1855	Succeeded by Elisha Huntington
