= Thomas H. Braden =

American politician

Thomas Henry Braden

50th Mayor of Lowell, Massachusetts
- In office 1929–1931
- Preceded by: Thomas J. Corbett
- Succeeded by: Charles H. Slowey

Member of the Massachusetts Senate 8th Middlesex District

President of the Lowell, Massachusetts City Council

Member of the Lowell, Massachusetts City Council

Member of the Lowell, Massachusetts Board of Aldermen

Personal details
- Born: September 11, 1874 Mooers, New York
- Party: Republican

Thomas Henry Braden (September 11, 1874 – after 1941) was an American politician. He served as the fiftieth Mayor of Lowell, Massachusetts.

Born in Mooers, New York, Braden worked as a clerk in the city's office of elections, eventually becoming the Commissioner of Elections. He was elected to a one-year term as mayor of Lowell in 1928, and re-elected to a two-year term in 1929. In 1932, Braden sought the Republican nomination for sheriff of Middlesex County, Massachusetts. and in 1936, was elected to the Massachusetts State Senate from that county, defeating Democratic challenger James H. Deignan to succeed the retiring incumbent Democratic senator William F. McCarty. In the state senate, Braden championed efforts to limit or prohibit Sunday liquor sales. Braden ran for mayor again in 1939, but was defeated by Democrat George D. Ashe. Braden ran for mayor for a last time in 1941, and was again defeated by Ashe, thereafter declaring his retirement from politics.

Braden was married in the late 1910s, but his wife died of influenza in 1918, three months after their marriage. He married his second wife, Florence J. Hunter of Lowell, in 1931.

== See also ==
- 1937–1938 Massachusetts legislature

Political offices
Preceded by Thomas J. Corbett	50th Mayor of Lowell, Massachusetts; 1929–1931	Succeeded by Charles H. Slowey
