= Elisha Bartlett =

American politician (1804–1855)

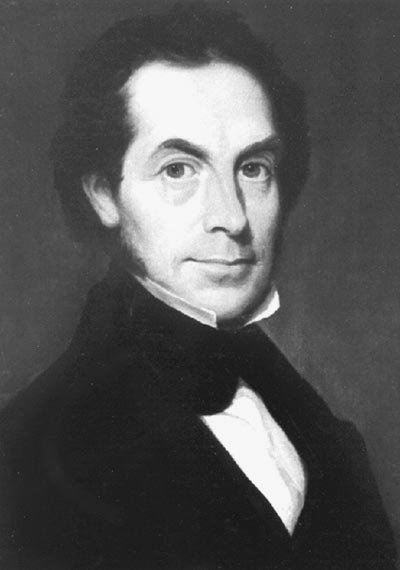

1st Mayor of Lowell, Massachusetts
- In office 1836–1838
- Preceded by: Board of Selectmen
- Succeeded by: Luther Lawrence

Member of the Massachusetts House of Representatives

Member of the Massachusetts House of Representatives
- In office 1841–1841

Personal details
- Born: October 6, 1804 Smithfield, Rhode Island
- Died: July 19, 1855 Smithfield, Rhode Island
- Party: Whig
- Spouse: Elizabeth Slater
- Education: Brown University, M.D., 1826.
- Occupation: Medical doctor

Elisha Bartlett (October 6, 1804 – July 19, 1855) was a medical doctor, professor and poet who served in the Massachusetts House of Representatives and as the first mayor of Lowell, Massachusetts.

== Medical professor ==
Elisha Bartlett was born in Smithfield, Rhode Island, and was educated in Smithfield, Uxbridge, and a friend's school in New York. After studying medicine under the mentorship of Dr. Willard of Uxbridge, Dr. Green and Dr. Heywood of Worcester, and Dr. Levi Wheaton of Providence, he earned an M.D. degree at Brown Medical School in 1826. Beginning with his appointment as Professor of Pathological Anatomy and Materia Medica at the Berkshire Medical College in Pittsfield, Massachusetts, in 1832, Bartlett taught at a number of medical schools, including Transylvania University, the University of Maryland School of Medicine, Vermont Medical College, Woodstock, Vermont, the University of Louisville, where he was Professor of the Theory and Practice of Medicine, the University of the City of New York, and the College of Physicians and Surgeons in New York City, where he was Chair of Materia Medica and Medical Jurisprudence. He was elected a Fellow of the American Academy of Arts and Sciences in 1845.

== First Mayor of Lowell ==
After graduating from Brown in 1826 and brief study in Paris, Bartlett married Elizabeth Slater, also of Smithfield, and in 1827 settled in Lowell, Massachusetts. Except for his tenure at Berkshire Medical College, he remained in Lowell throughout the 1830s. In April 1836, Lowell received its city charter from the Commonwealth of Massachusetts, and in October 1836, Bartlett was elected as the city's first mayor. Running as a Whig, he defeated Democrat Eliphalet Case 958–868 for a one-year term. In 1837 he ran for re-election, defeating Case again, by a margin of 1,018-817.

During his tenure he was faced with the challenges of the Lowell Mill Girls strike in 1836, and the Panic of 1837.

== Writings ==
- An Address of the Birth of Spurzheim (1838)
- The history, diagnosis, and treatment of typhoid and of typhus fever, with an essay on the diagnosis of bilious remittent and of yellow fever (1842).
- An essay on the philosophy of medical science, (1844).
- The history, diagnosis, and treatment of the fevers of the United States, (1847).
- An inquiry into the degree of certainty in medicine: and into the nature and extent of its power over disease, (1848).
- The history, diagnosis, and treatment of edematous laryngitis, (1850).

== Bibliography ==
- Rider, Sidney Smith (1878), A Brief Memoir of Dr. Elisha Bartlett: With Selections from His Writings, Providence, Rhode Island: Sidney Smith Rider
- Stempsey, William E. (2005), Elisha Bartlett's Philosophy of Medicine, Dordrecht, Netherlands: Springer, ISBN 140203041X

Political offices
Preceded by Board of Selectmen	1st Mayor of Lowell, Massachusetts; 1836–1838	Succeeded by Luther Lawrence
Academic offices
Preceded by	Professor of Pathological Anatomy and Materia Medica at the Berkshire Medical Institute; Pittsfield, Massachusetts; 1832–1832	Succeeded by
Preceded by	Professor of the Theory and Practice of Medicine; University of Louisville; March 13, 1849 – September 1850	Succeeded by
Preceded by J. R. Beck	Chair of Materia Medica and Medical Jurisprudence at the College of Physicians and Surgeons; New York City; March 5, 1852–1855	Succeeded by
