= William Taupier =

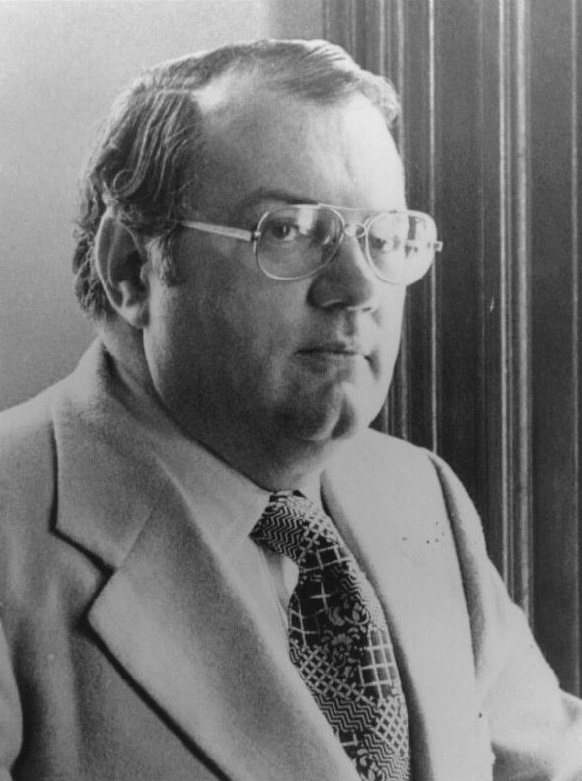

Mayor of Holyoke, Massachusetts
- In office 1968–1975
- Preceded by: Daniel F. Dibble
- Succeeded by: Thomas Monahan (acting)

City Manager of Lowell, Massachusetts
- In office 1975–1979
- Preceded by: Paul J. Sheehy
- Succeeded by: B. Joseph Tully

Personal details
- Born: September 24, 1936 Holyoke, MA
- Died: December 3, 2014 (aged 78) Lowell, MA
- Party: Democratic
- Education: Boston College
- Occupation: Politician; City Manager

William S. Taupier (September 24, 1936 – December 3, 2014) was an American politician and city manager who served as Mayor of Holyoke, Massachusetts from 1968 to 1975 and City Manager of Lowell, Massachusetts from 1975 to 1979.

== Early life ==
Taupier became interested in politics at a young age. He attended his first Board of Aldermen meeting at the age of sixteen. Taupier was twice elected class president in high school. He envisioned himself becoming campaign manager.

Taupier attended Boston College, where he earned a degree and met Patricia McGuire. The two married in 1960 and a year later they settled in Holyoke. Once in Holyoke, Taupier began attending alderman meetings and looked for a candidate to manage. Unable to find one, he decided to run himself and was elected as an alderman-at-large in 1963.

== Mayor ==
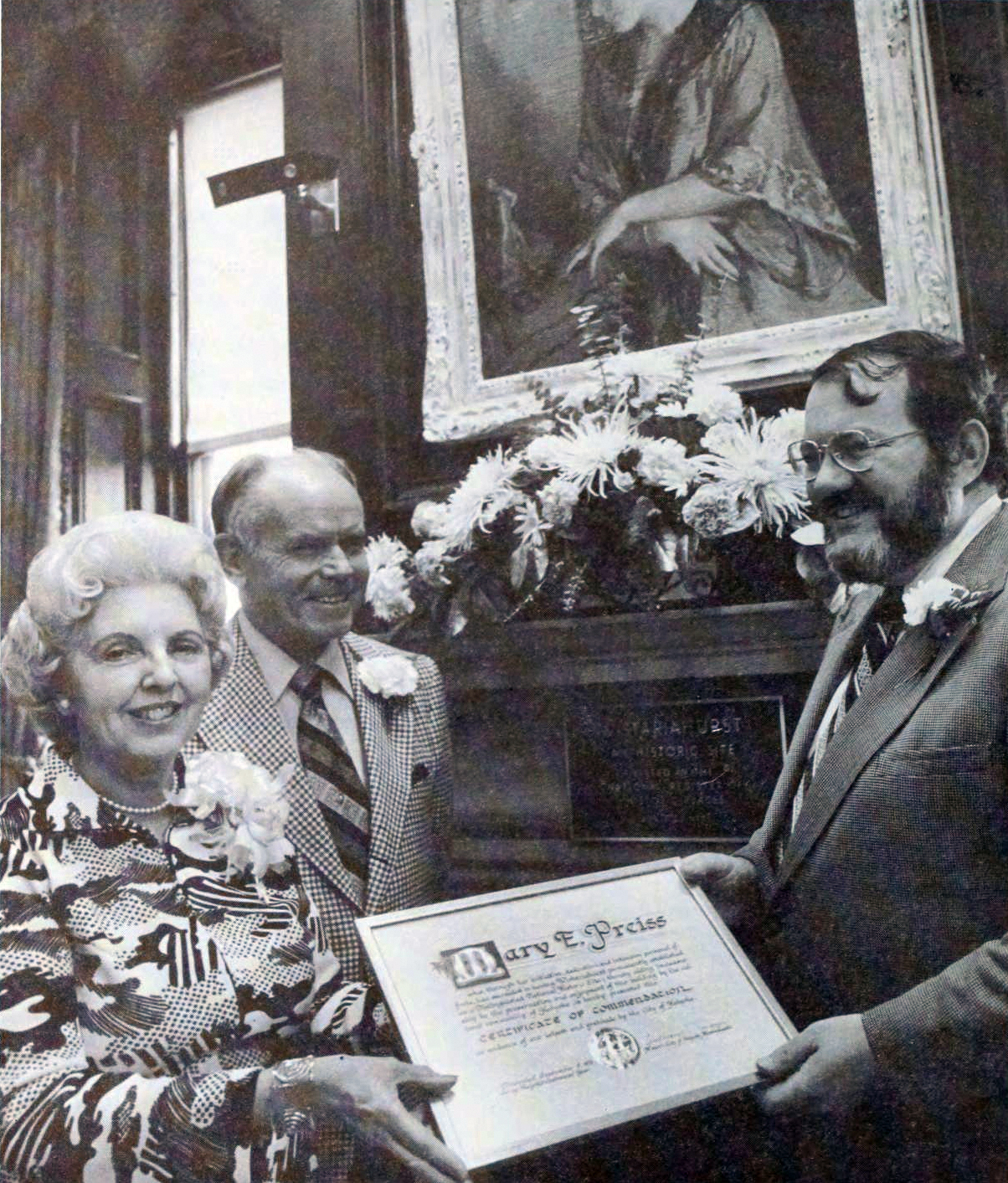
Mayor William Taupier presenting Mary E. Preiss a certificate of commendation for her work in getting Wistariahurst on the National Register of Historic Places

Taupier realized that he would be unable to do many of the things he wanted to do as an alderman so he decided to run for mayor in 1967. He defeated incumbent Daniel Dibble by approximately 600 votes. Among his most enduring accomplishments was the creation of the Friends of Holyoke Community College in the wake of a massive fire that nearly forced the college to permanently close. That organization subsequently became the Holyoke Community College Foundation which manages its endowment and donor-funded scholarships today. Taupier was reelected in 1969, 1971, and 1973, but decided not to run in 1975.

== City Manager ==
On October 15, 1975 Taupier was selected to serve as Lowell City Manager by a 5 to 4 vote of the City Council. He was chosen over Armand Mercier and Robert W. Healy after sixteen ballots. Taupier succeeded Paul J. Sheehy, who resigned after he was convicted of bank fraud. Taupier resigned in 1979 to accept a job with a private company in Saudi Arabia.

== Civic involvement in Lowell ==
Taupier returned to Lowell, where he worked as a real estate developer and was the owner of two real estate agencies. In 1995 he was elected to the Lowell School Committee. He finished in fifth place with 5,904 votes in a race where the top six vote getters were elected. He was elected to a second term in 1997. When the Lowell Lock Monsters American Hockey League franchise was about to leave the city, Taupier worked with the "Save the Lock Monsters" citizens committee to save the team. He also served on the Lowell Memorial Auditorium Board of Trustees.
