= John Janas =

American politician

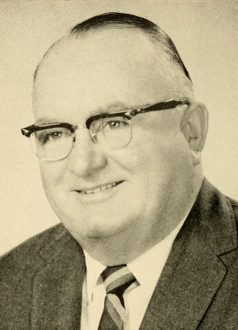

Member of the Massachusetts House of Representatives
- In office 1963–1969
- Preceded by: Cornelius Desmond
- Succeeded by: Nicholas Lambros
- Constituency: 15th Middlesex (1963–1969); 29th Middlesex (1969)

Mayor of Lowell, Massachusetts
- In office 1954–1955
- Preceded by: Henry Beaudry
- Succeeded by: Samuel S. Pollard

Personal details
- Born: September 4, 1910 Lowell, Massachusetts
- Died: December 5, 1969 (aged 59) Lowell, Massachusetts
- Party: Republican
- Education: Lowell Technological Institute
- Occupation: Real estate and insurance broker

John Jacob Janas (September 4, 1910 – December 5, 1969) was an American politician who served as mayor of Lowell, Massachusetts, and as a member of the Massachusetts House of Representatives.

== Early life ==
Janas was born on September 4, 1910, in Lowell. He graduated from Lowell High School and took evening courses at the Lowell Technological Institute.

== Political career ==
Janas began his political career as a member of the Lowell school committee. He then served fourteen years as a member of the Lowell city council and from 1954 to 1955 also served as mayor.

In 1962, Janas was elected to the Massachusetts House of Representatives in an upset victory. He was the first Republican to represent the 15th Middlesex district. Janas remained in the House until his death on December 5, 1969. Lowell's John J. Janas Memorial Ice Skating Rink, built in 1971, is named in his honor.
