= John J. Pickman =

American politician

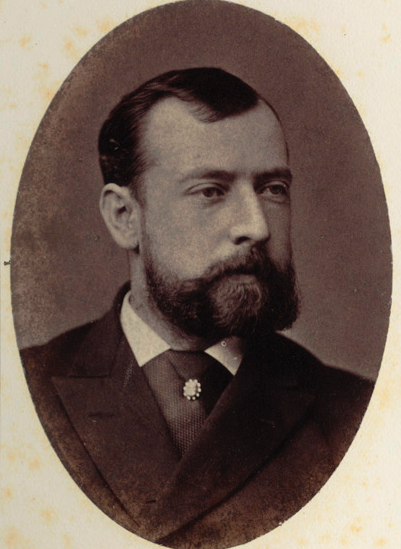

33rd Mayor of Lowell, Massachusetts
- In office 1893–1894
- Preceded by: George W. Fifield
- Succeeded by: William F. Courtney

Member of the Massachusetts House of Representatives
- In office 1879–1880

Personal details
- Born: John James Pickman; January 9, 1850 Lowell, Massachusetts, U.S.
- Died: August 17, 1930 (aged 80) Lowell, Massachusetts, U.S.
- Party: Republican
- Education: Harvard Law School

John James Pickman (January 9, 1850 – August 17, 1930) was an American attorney and politician who was the 33rd mayor of Lowell, Massachusetts. A Republican, he was a member of the Massachusetts House of Representatives from 1879 to 1880. He was a member of the Lowell Common Council from 1876 to 1877. He was a member of the Lowell School Board from 1882 to 1885.

He was buried at Edson Cemetery in Lowell, Massachusetts.

Political offices
Preceded by George W. Fifield	33rd Mayor of Lowell, Massachusetts; 1893–1894	Succeeded by William F. Courtney
