= James H. B. Ayer =

American politician

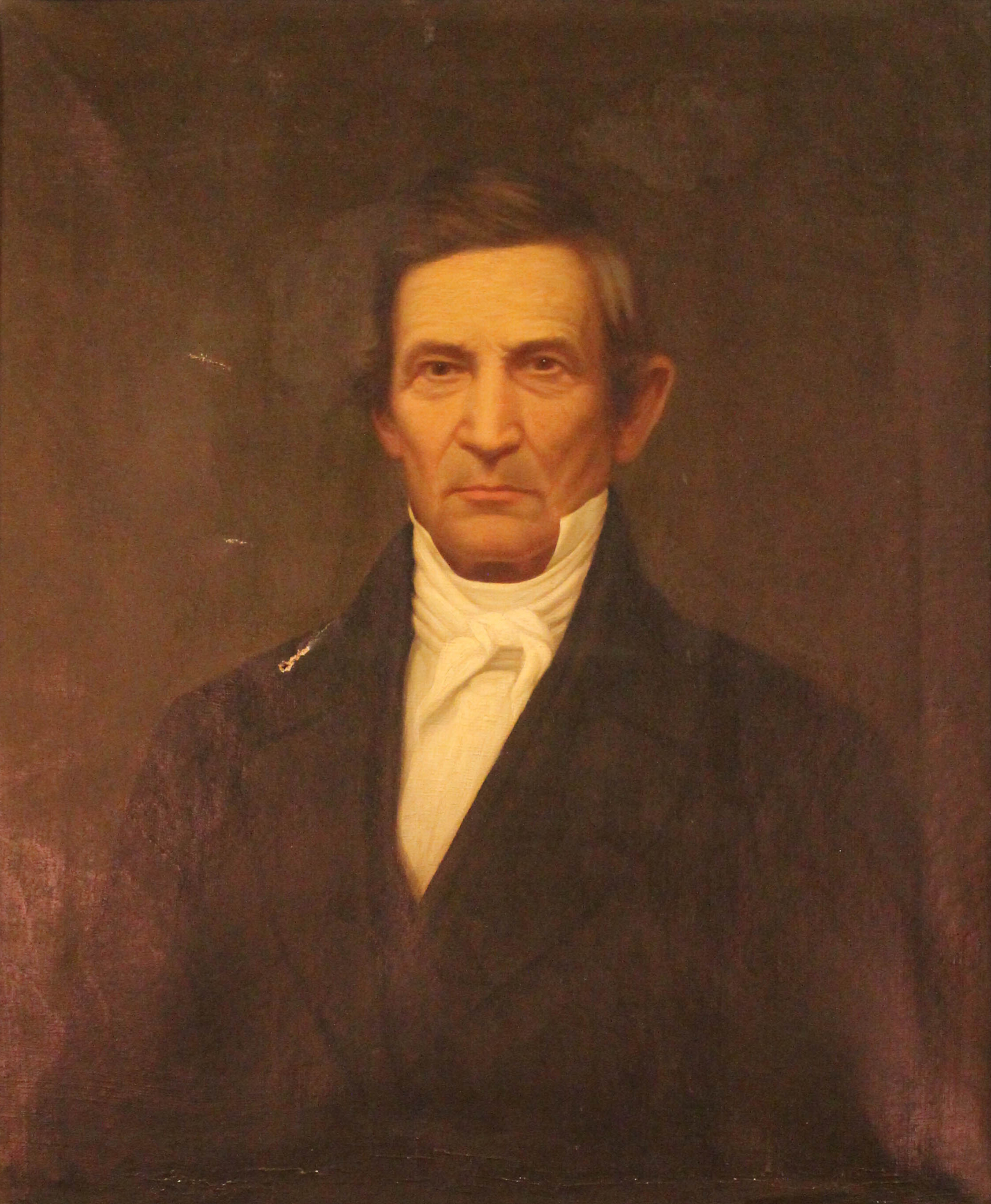

8th Mayor of Lowell, Massachusetts
- In office 1851–1851
- Preceded by: Josiah B. French
- Succeeded by: Elisha Huntington

Member of the Lowell, Massachusetts Board of Aldermen

Personal details
- Born: 1788
- Died: 1864 (aged 75–76)
- Party: Whig
- Occupation: Mill Manager and Paymaster

James Hazen Brickett Ayer (1788–1864) served as the eighth Mayor of Lowell, Massachusetts.

Prior to becoming mayor, Ayer served as the manager of the lumber department at Merrimack Mills, and as Paymaster for the Locks and Canals Company, both in Lowell.

Political offices
Preceded by Josiah B. French	8th Mayor of Lowell, Massachusetts; 1851	Succeeded by Elisha Huntington
