= Susan F. Rourke =

American politician

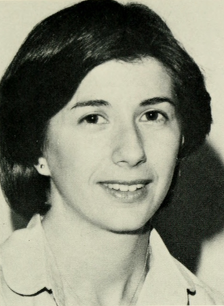

Member of the Massachusetts House of Representatives from the 19th Middlesex district
- In office 1983–1993
- Preceded by: Timothy Rourke

Personal details
- Born: Susan Frances Fergola; March 7, 1954 (age 72)

Susan Frances Rourke (née Fergola; born March 7, 1954) is an American Democratic politician from Lowell, Massachusetts. She represented the 19th Middlesex district in the Massachusetts House of Representatives from 1983 to 1993. She succeeded her late husband, Timothy Rourke, who was killed in April 1982 in an automobile accident.

She was educated at Lowell High School and the University of Massachusetts Dartmouth. She married Rourke in October 1973.

== See also ==
- 1983–1984 Massachusetts legislature
- 1985–1986 Massachusetts legislature
- 1987–1988 Massachusetts legislature
- 1989–1990 Massachusetts legislature
- 1991–1992 Massachusetts legislature
