= Charles E. Howe =

American politician

Charles Emerson Howe
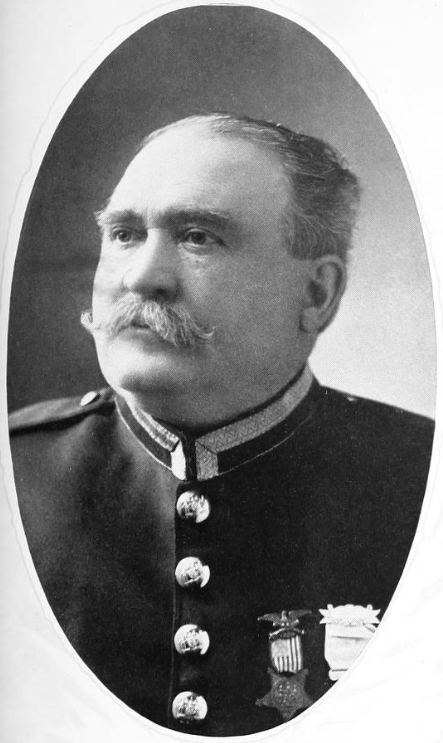

38th Mayor of Lowell, Massachusetts
- In office 1903 – January 1904
- Preceded by: William E. Badger
- Succeeded by: James B. Casey

Chairman of the Lowell, Massachusetts Board of Aldermen
- In office 1896–1896

Member of the Lowell, Massachusetts Board of Aldermen
- In office 1894–1896

Personal details
- Born: January 27, 1846 Gonic Village, Rochester, New Hampshire
- Died: July 23, 1911 (aged 65) Lowell, Massachusetts
- Party: Republican
- Spouse: Elizabeth F. Webster

Military service
- Allegiance: (United States) Union
- Branch/service: Union Army
- Rank: Private
- Commands: Company E, Thirteenth Massachusetts Regiment.
- Battles/wars: American Civil War, Thoroughfare Gap, Second Bull Run

Charles Emerson Howe (January 27, 1846 – July 23, 1911) was an American politician who served as the thirty eighth Mayor of Lowell, Massachusetts.

== Early life ==
Howe was born to John Swain and Mary (Chadwick) Howe in Gonic, a village in the city of Rochester, New Hampshire, January 27, 1846.

== Family life ==
On January 1, 1884, Howe married Elizabeth F. Webster of Lowell, Massachusetts.

He died at his home in Lowell on July 23, 1911.

== Notes ==
Political offices
Preceded by William E. Badger	38th Mayor of Lowell, Massachusetts; 1903-1904	Succeeded by James B. Casey
