= Jonathan P. Folsom =

American politician

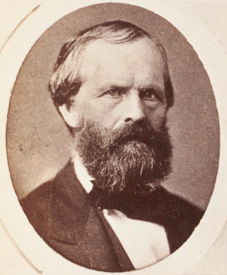

20th Mayor of Lowell, Massachusetts
- In office January 4, 1869 – 1870
- Preceded by: George F. Richardson
- Succeeded by: Edward F. Sherman

Member of the Massachusetts House of Representatives

Member of the Lowell, Massachusetts Board of Aldermen
- In office 1859; 1861; 1878; – 1859; 1862; 1878

Member of the Lowell, Massachusetts Common Council
- In office 1856; 1867; 1867; – 1856; 1867; 1867;

Personal details
- Born: October 9, 1820 Tamworth, New Hampshire
- Died: February 23, 1893 (aged 72)

Jonathan P. Folsom (October 9, 1820 – February 23, 1893) served as the twentieth Mayor of Lowell, Massachusetts.

== Business career ==
Folsom was, for many years, involved in the dry goods trade. Folsom had a dry goods store on Merrimack Street, in Lowell.

Folsom was a director of the Old Lowell National Bank, and a Trustee of the Central Savings Bank.

== Public service career ==
Folsom was a member of the Lowell Common Council, Board of Aldermen, and was twice elected the mayor of Lowell.

After he was mayor Folsom served two terms in the Massachusetts legislature as a member of the Massachusetts House of Representatives.

== See also ==
- 1872 Massachusetts legislature

Political offices
Preceded by George F. Richardson	20th Mayor of Lowell, Massachusetts; January 4, 1869-1870	Succeeded by Edward F. Sherman
