= Frederick W. Farnham =

American mayor

40th Mayor of Lowell, Massachusetts
- In office 1907–1908
- Preceded by: James B. Casey
- Succeeded by: George H. Brown

Personal details
- Born: November 30, 1860 Lowell, Massachusetts
- Died: December 11, 1943 Lowell, Massachusetts
- Party: Republican
- Spouse(s): Eleanor P. Butters; m. October 13, 1886
- Occupation: Assistant City Engineer

Frederick W. Farnham (November 30, 1860 – December 11, 1943) served as the fortieth Mayor of Lowell, Massachusetts.

Political offices
Preceded by James B. Casey	40th Mayor of Lowell, Massachusetts; 1907-1908	Succeeded by George H. Brown
