= Mikko Herman Lipasti =

Mikko Herman Lipasti from the University of Wisconsin-Madison, Madison, WI was named Fellow of the Institute of Electrical and Electronics Engineers (IEEE) in 2013 for contributions to the microarchitecture and design of high-performance microprocessors and computer systems.
