= Tony Lupien =

American baseball player (1917–2004)

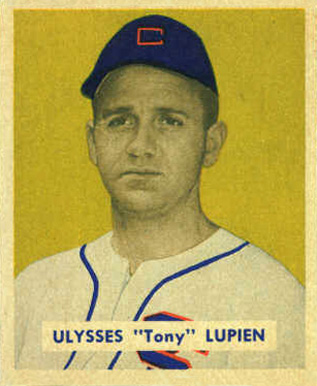
- Lupien in 1949
- First baseman
- Born: April 23, 1917; Chelmsford, Massachusetts, U.S.
- Died: July 9, 2004 (aged 87); Norwich, Vermont, U.S.
- Batted: Left Threw: Left

MLB debut
- September 12, 1940, for the Boston Red Sox

Last MLB appearance
- October 3, 1948, for the Chicago White Sox

MLB statistics
- Batting average: .268
- Home runs: 18
- Runs batted in: 230
- Stats at Baseball Reference

Teams
- Boston Red Sox (1940, 1942–1943); Philadelphia Phillies (1944–1945); Chicago White Sox (1948)

Ulysses John "Tony" Lupien Jr. (April 23, 1917 – July 9, 2004) was an American first baseman in Major League Baseball (MLB). He was a left-handed batter who played for the Boston Red Sox, Philadelphia Phillies and Chicago White Sox. Lupien was an all-around athlete and successful coach. He was the grandfather of former professional wrestler, and actor John Cena.

== Early life ==
Lupien was born in Chelmsford, Massachusetts, the son of Eugenie Gosselin and Ulysses J. Lupien. His parents were of French Canadian descent, and his father was named "Ulysses" because of his great-grandfather's admiration for president Ulysses S. Grant. Lupien graduated from Harvard in 1939. At Harvard, he was captain of the baseball team as a junior and of the basketball team as a senior. He was the Eastern Intercollegiate League batting champion in 1938 and 1939, and he also was a quarterback for his freshman football team.

== Career ==
Upon graduation from Harvard, Lupien signed a professional baseball contract with the Red Sox and played the 1939 season for the Double-A Scranton Red Sox Eastern League championship team. He made his major league debut for the Red Sox on September 12, 1940. One of his most productive seasons came in 1942 when he batted .281 with three home runs and 70 runs batted in for the Red Sox. He was traded to the Phillies where he played in 1944 and early in 1945, before serving in the U.S. Navy during World War II. In the 1944 season, he hit .283 with five homers, 52 RBI, 82 runs, 23 doubles, 9 triples and 18 stolen bases. After his discharge from the Navy, Lupien played two years for the Hollywood Stars of the Pacific Coast League, where his 1947 record of batting .341, with 21 homers and 110 RBI, led to his return to the major leagues for one final season in 1948, with the White Sox.

Lupien finished his MLB career hitting .268 with 18 home runs, 230 RBI, 285 runs, 92 doubles, 30 triples, and 57 stolen bases in 614 games. Excellent defensively, he recorded a .993 fielding percentage with only 45 errors in 6077 total chances in 602 games covering 5338 innings. In 1949, he played with Triple-A Toledo (American Association). He concluded his professional career from 1951 to 1953 and in 1955 when he was a player as well as field and general manager with the Jamestown Falcons and Corning Independents, in the PONY League. From 1951 to 1956, he was head basketball coach at Middlebury College, compiling a record of 60–49 in five seasons.

In 1956, Lupien was hired as the Dartmouth Big Green baseball coach. He spent 21 seasons at Dartmouth College and guided his teams to 313 wins, 305 losses and three ties, winning the Eastern Baseball Intercollegiate League championship four times (1963, 1967, 1969–70). His 1970 team advanced to the College World Series at Omaha, Nebraska where it finished fifth. That team had a 24–10 record that included a 21-game win streak. He was also the Dartmouth freshman basketball coach from 1956 to 1968.

== Personal life and legacy ==
Lupien retired from coaching in 1977, but continued to work for many years as a stockbroker with various firms in New England. He died in Norwich, Vermont, at 87 years of age. He was married to Natalie Nichols, and later to Mildred Robinson. His grandson is professional wrestler and actor John Cena, with whom he shared a birthday. He was Catholic.

Lupien was recognized for decades as a great teacher and mentor. He was also an outspoken observer of labor relations in professional baseball. In 1980 he collaborated with writer Lee Lowenfish to author The Imperfect Diamond, a book that remains a definitive text on baseball labor from the introduction of the reserve clause in 1879 to the litigation in the 1970s that led to free agency. . In recognition of his lasting impact on the community where he was born, Chelmsford Youth Baseball named one of their baseball fields after Lupien, an honor that remains to this day.
