= Lowell State College =

College in Lowell, Massachusetts, United States

- Type: Public college
- Active: June 6, 1894–1975; 51 years ago; merged to form University of Lowell
- Location: Lowell, Massachusetts, United States; 42°38′31.13″N 71°20′7.30″W
- Campus: Urban

Lowell State College was a public college in Lowell, Massachusetts, United States. It was established in 1959 and is the precursor to the University of Massachusetts Lowell. The founding of this new state school was the culmination of decades of institutional growth that began in 1894 with the establishment of Lowell Normal School (a two-year training college for teachers), continued through the transition to the four-year Lowell Teachers College in 1932, and concluded in 1959 with the founding of Lowell State College. From 1959 to 1975, Lowell State College served the region's need for comprehensive public higher education. It was not superseded in this role until the merging of Lowell State College and Lowell Technological Institute into one new organization—University of Lowell and then the University of Massachusetts Lowell in 1991. The Lowell State College campus continues to serve as the core of what is now known as the University of Massachusetts Lowell's South Campus. The final enrollment at Lowell State College was 2,353 students with 1,877 of them undergraduates and 476 of them being postgraduates.

Lowell State College and its predecessor organizations—Lowell Normal School and Lowell Teachers College—together served as important economic, political, and cultural drivers to the region through the development of teachers to serve in schools in the region and the opportunities offered for further education in diverse fields as the school expanded. Located in Lowell, Massachusetts, one of the country's early sites of industrial manufacturing, the city was the home of diverse and rapid immigration as new waves of new people sought jobs in the mills. Spanning the period from 1894 to 1960, Lowell State College (and its earlier iterations) were one of the major institutions in this regional city in northeastern Massachusetts.

== Lowell Normal School (1894–1932) ==
Coburn Hall, 1899, Lowell Normal School

The Lowell Normal School was chartered in 1894 as a teacher training institution. Located in Lowell, Massachusetts, one of the new manufacturing towns springing up in America that had been carved out of several, earlier Colonial villages (Dracut, Chelmsford, Tyngsboro, Tewksbury), which were themselves sitting on land once the province of the indigenous peoples of the area. As a new and growing town, Lowell had established a reputation for educational innovation with the creation of the "first co-educational and racially integrated High School in the country (1831)."

Securing the right to establish the state school in Lowell required backing from the State Board of Education and the legislature of the Commonwealth. Normal schools already existed in Westfield, Bridgewater, Worcester, and Framingham, Massachusetts when the legislature began to consider the need for the development of more. The Lowell School Committee and the city council lobbied hard for the Normal School, eventually beating out the town of Lawrence for the honor. Along with Lowell, normal schools were created in Barnstable, Fitchburg, and North Adams.

Lowell Normal School opened in 1897 with 108 students—3 men joined the first class of 105 female students—and five faculty members. The two-year program prepared teachers to work in grades 1-9. Required classes included "educational methods and psychology and how to teach various subjects to children including English, mathematics, science, and drawing."

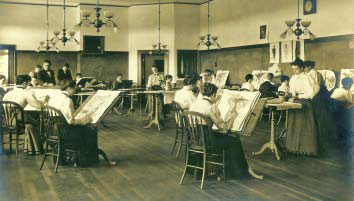
Geography class at Lowell Normal School in the early 1900s

The original classroom building opened the next year at the corner of Broadway and Wilder streets and quickly became a landmark in the city. Designed by local firm Stickney & Austin, it reflects the fashion of the time: high-style Beaux Arts with classical symmetry, arches, cast-iron lampposts and yellow brick. Its design was influenced in part by Lowell High School, which was also designed by Lowell native Frederick W. Stickney. Frank Coburn, for whom the hall was later named, served as the school's first principal until 1908.

The main mission of the school at that time was to prepare students for the teaching of elementary education. Courses typically took two years, with the third and fourth years optional because of space in the building. In 1910, the mission of the school expanded with the creation of a three-year music program.

As the mission of the school was to train the students, they needed space so that the students would be able to practice their skills. The nearby Bartlett Training School was first used when 27 rooms were made available.

Principals of the Normal School included: Frank Coburn (1897–1907); Cyrus A. Durgin (1908–1916); John Mahoney (1916–1922); and Clarence Weed (1922–1935). Teresa Garland Lew and Marion Scott Lew were notable graduates of the Lowell Normal School (Class of 1914). Members of an historically important African-American family within the Dracut/Lowell area, they were the first African Americans to graduate from the Normal School. Teresa Garland Lew went on to teach for 21 years at the Bartlett Training School and obtained a law degree from Portia Law School in Boston. Marion Lew was one of the first graduates of the new music program at the Normal School.

== Lowell Teachers College (1932–1959) ==
In the early 1930s, Lowell Normal School transitioned to Lowell Teachers College becoming a four-year program for the training of teachers.

The years prior to this transition were challenging for the Normal School as enrollments steadily declined and the job situation for teachers worsened. An economic boom in the 1920's that accompanied the peak of the textile industry led to a building boom across Lowell. However, this was followed by the depression, and, for Lowell, massive loss of jobs and wages and a 12% drop in population.

In 1938, in order to balance budgets state legislators considered a suggestion to close several normal schools. School administrators rallied local support to help keep it open. A delegation of prominent individuals representing Lowell's powerful interest groups traveled to Boston and convinced state officials of the school's importance. The result was that the school not only survived but continued to grow and expand.

James M. Dugan (1936–1950) led the school through these challenging years. He was the first Catholic to be selected to head the school. He revitalized curriculum, hired new staff, and sought accreditation with the American Association of Teachers' Colleges.

Dugan's tenure was followed by Daniel H. O'Leary (1950–1965) who oversaw the next transition from four-year teachers college to comprehensive state college in 1960.

Mary A. Halleren (class of 1927) was a particularly well known graduate. She taught at the Normal School for 15 years before she joined the Women's Army Corps in 1942, where she rose steadily through the service to eventually become director before she retired in 1960

== Lowell State College (1960–1975) ==
As the demand for more qualified teachers grew, the legislature reorganized the Normal School into Lowell State College in 1960 with a curriculum that expanded beyond education to include baccalaureate degrees in other fields including nursing and music. Beginning in 1967, the college was authorized to confer two graduate degrees: Master of Education and Master of Music Education.

In addition to education, Lowell State College also expanded to include a school of nursing. Gertrude Barker led the charge for the program on campus, eventually becoming Dean of the College of Health Professions. A specialist in the field of aging, she became a fellow in the American Academy of Nursing in 1980.

On other fronts within the college, liberal arts programs were expanding and the numbers of faculty holding the Ph.D. degree also increased.

In 1950, Daniel O'Leary assumed the presidency and initiated an ambitious building program. The physical plant of the campus expanded during post-war era from a single structure to a multi-building complex, forming an area now known as UMass Lowell's South Campus.The dedication of several buildings named for each of the school's six presidents was held on June 9, 1974. These buildings were built in the style of brutalism.

During these years, in addition to the school presidents, there were a number of important administrators and educators who also played significant roles in the development of the school. Mary McGauvran, a 1939 graduate of Lowell Teachers College, returned to her alma mater In 1957, going on to hold important positions as director of admissions, assistant dean of women, and director of student affairs. McGauvran was a teacher and a nationally recognized assessment expert with a Ph.D. from Boston University Patricia A. Goler was hired in the Social Sciences department (later the History Department of Lowell State College). She was not only the first female African-American Ph.D. to be hired at Lowell Teachers College, but the first within the Commonwealth's public higher education system. Marguerite Gourville was originally hired as director of physical education in 1936, and quickly distinguished herself as founder of the Modern Dance Club. Gourville, like McGauvran want on to fill many important administrative roles including dean (1944) and interim president (1950).

== Merger ==
In 1972, a feasibility study was conducted on merging the school with the nearby Lowell Technological Institute. In 1975, the schools merged to form the University of Lowell. The name was changed in 1991 to the University of Massachusetts Lowell when the institution joined the University of Massachusetts system. Today, the school's campus is known as the South Campus of UMass Lowell. The legacy of Lowell Normal School lives on in the University of Massachusetts Lowell College of Education.
