= Ulysses J. Lupien =

American businessman and government official

City Manager of Lowell, Massachusetts
- In office 1952–1953
- Preceded by: John J. Flannery
- Succeeded by: Frank E. Barrett

Massachusetts Director of Civil Service
- In office 1939–1944

Personal details
- Born: December 12, 1883 Cochituate, Massachusetts, U.S.
- Died: August 15, 1965 (aged 81) Lowell, Massachusetts, U.S.
- Party: Republican
- Spouse: Eugenie Gosselin
- Children: 4, including Tony
- Relatives: John Cena (great-grandson); Natalie Enright Jerger (great-granddaughter)
- Education: Harvard College
- Occupation: Businessman; Government official

Ulysses John Lupien Sr. (December 12, 1883 – August 15, 1965) was an American businessman and politician who served as Massachusetts director of civil service and city manager of Lowell, Massachusetts.

== Early life ==
Lupien was born in Cochituate, a neighborhood in Wayland, Massachusetts. His parents were of French Canadian descent and were brought to the United States from Canada when they were infants. He was named "Ulysses" because of his grandfather's admiration for President Ulysses S. Grant. He began working at the age of 14, shoeing mules at the Metropolitan Water Works. After about six months, he was given a job swinging a sledgehammer and was later promoted to a pick and shovel crew. He later worked in construction as a concrete mixer and as a shoe packer for a shoe manufacturing company. Lupien also played semipro baseball while working and attending school.

After graduating from Wayland High School, Lupien attended Harvard College. He worked his way through school as a tutor. While at Harvard, Lupien was unable to play for the school's varsity athletic teams due to his status as a semipro baseball player. He graduated from Harvard in 1906.

After graduating, Lupien worked at the General Electric plant in Lynn, Massachusetts. During World War I, he was in charge of construction at the Bethlehem Sparrows Point Shipyard in Sparrows Point, Maryland. Lupien later worked as a teacher and athletic coach at the Lowell Textile Institute. Courses taught by Lupien included electrical engineering and physics. While he was at the Institute, Lupien also acted as a contractor on the school's construction projects, which included additions to the school and installing a power plant.

== Business career ==
Lupien left the Institute to enter the business world. His first job was as director of industrial relations at Cheney Brothers in Manchester, Connecticut. In 1933, he returned to Massachusetts as the director of public relations for Pacific Mills in Lawrence, Massachusetts. His duties as public relations director included passing on the qualifications of job applicants, which were then divided into between 200 and 250 types of work.

== Director of civil service ==
In 1939, Lupien was appointed to a five-year term as the state director of civil service. The position was created by a revision in the state law which replaced the three-person civil service board with a five-person commission consisting of members of both political parties and a civil service director chosen by the board and approved by the Governor. His duties consisted of appointing examiners, setting up classifications, and judging appeals.

Lupien's appointment was heralded as an end to favoritism in civil service hiring. Lupien considered himself to be a political independent, as he had never voted a straight party line in his life, and his only political experience was on the Chelmsford, Massachusetts school committee more than two decades earlier. He sought to eliminate the practice of job selling in the state civil service and pledged to hire the best person, regardless of race, religion, or political affiliation. He was praised for breathing new life into the civil service system, but was also involved in a number of controversies involving the hiring and firing of employees. One such controversy involved the Lowell School Committee voting to bypass Lupien's recommendation for the position of school attendance officer, a disabled veteran who had scored a 72 on the civil service test, in favor of a woman who had earned a higher score (90), as the committee had asked only for a list of female candidates (the school system already had a male attendance officer and wanted a female officer as there was a majority of female students). He was also criticized by Boston City Councilor Charles I. Taylor for usurping the power of the chief executives of the cities in towns by serving as the final authority on whether or not municipalities needed additional temporary help.

After his term ended, Lupien returned to Pacific Mills as the consulting director of public relations.

== Lowell city manager ==
On November 29, 1952, the Lowell City Council voted five to four to appoint Lupien to the position of city manager. Lupien was elected over City Solicitor P. Harold Ready on the 10th ballot at a special meeting called days before incumbent city manager John J. Flannery was to retire due to ill health. Lupien was sworn in by the city clerk soon after the vote was taken. In September 1953, the Lowell retirement board ruled that Lupien, who would turn 70 in December, must quit by December 31 of that year, citing a provision in the retirement law dealing with employees who began their initial employment with the city after the age of 60. On November 10, 1953, the City Council voted five to three to remove Lupien from office in order to give the next city manager plenty of time to prepare the city's budget for the following year.

After his firing, Lupien campaigned to get his job back. Four city councilors strongly supported him and were ready to rehire him if a fifth councilor was willing to join them. He remained involved in Lowell politics by delivering a weekly "State of the Nation" radio address. On July 24, 1954, Lupien announced his candidacy for the Massachusetts Senate seat in the 1st Middlesex District, which included his hometown of Chelmsford as well as most of Lowell. He faced incumbent Senator Paul A. Achin and former Lowell City Council candidate Joseph N. Herbert. According to Fred A. Simmonds of The Boston Daily Globe, Lupien's candidacy was viewed by some as a test of strength in his effort to return to Lowell politics. Lupien finished second in the primary with 2731 (36%) votes to Achin's 4099 (54%).

== Personal life and death ==
Lupien lived on a small farm in Chelmsford from 1939 until his death. He had four sons, Ulysses John "Tony" Lupien Jr., an athletic standout at Harvard who played professional baseball for the Boston Red Sox, Philadelphia Phillies, Chicago White Sox, and in the Pacific Coast League, Albert J. Lupien, captain of the 1932 Harvard Crimson baseball team, Theodore A. Lupien, also a varsity athlete at Harvard, and Frank U. Lupien. His great-grandson is wrestler and actor John Cena, and his great-granddaughter is computer scientist Natalie Enright Jerger.

Lupien died on August 15, 1965, at the Willow Nursing Home in Lowell. He was 81 years old.
