= Joseph B. O'Keefe =

American attorney and politician (1901-1983)

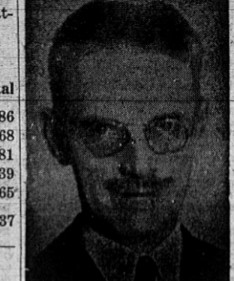

Mayor of Peabody, Massachusetts
- In office 1939–1946
- Preceded by: James E. McVann
- Succeeded by: Leo F. McGrath

Personal details
- Born: 1901 Salem, Massachusetts, U.S.
- Died: May 7, 1983 (aged 81–82) Peabody, Massachusetts, U.S.
- Party: Democratic
- Spouse: Stasia Guiney (1925–1974; her death)
- Education: Suffolk University Law School
- Occupation: Leather worker Attorney

Joseph B. O'Keefe (1901–1983) was an American attorney and politician who served as mayor of Peabody, Massachusetts.

== Early life ==
O'Keefe was born in Salem, Massachusetts, where his father, Bartholomew O'Keefe, was a city councilman and his uncle, Mathias J. O'Keefe, was mayor. O'Keefe was a leatherworker and a member of the Congress of Industrial Organizations' National Leather Workers' Association. While looking for work in Little Falls, New York, he met Anastasia "Stasia" Guiney. They married in 1925 and remained together until her death in 1974.

== Politics ==
In 1935, O'Keefe was elected represent ward 3 on the Peabody city council. In 1936, he challenged mayor James E. McVann, but lost by 58 votes.

McVann did not run for reelection in 1938 and O'Keefe defeated state representative John E. Murphy by 709 votes to become the city's chief executive. O'Keefe's first term was marked by a dispute with the trustees of J. B. Thomas Hospital. O'Keefe refused provide funding for the hospital because he believed its director, James F. Ingraham, had been illegally elected. The trustees stopped admitting new patients on December 20, 1939, and then closed the facility on January 31, 1940, due to a lack of money. On April 26, 1940, the city council rejected O'Keefe's proposed budget on an 8 to 3 vote because it did not include an appropriation for the hospital. On August 22, 1940, O'Keefe gave in and submitted a $40,000 appropriation for the hospital, which reopened on September 1, 1940.

Murphy and O'Keefe faced of again in the 1940 election. O'Keefe was declared the winner by a single vote, however a recount later expanded his margin of victory to eight votes. A group of citizens sought to remove O'Keefe from office on the grounds that he had violated the Corrupt Practices Act by spending more on his reelection campaign than the statute allowed. On May 13, 1941, the petition was denied by three Massachusetts Superior Court judges.

In 1942, O'Keefe was reelected to a third term when he defeated city councilor Carl Kiley 3980 votes to 2035. He was defeated for a fourth term in 1945 by city councilor Leo F. McGrath.

After leaving office, O'Keefe earned a law degree from the Suffolk University Law School. He challenged McGrath in the 1949 mayoral election and McGrath was once again victorious. In 1957 he ran in the special election to fill the Massachusetts House of Representatives seat that had been vacated by Philip J. Durkin. He finished fourth placed in the Democratic primary, which was won by Henry W. Hallinan.

O'Keefe died on May 7, 1983, in Peabody. He was survived by a daughter.
