= Leo F. McGrath =

American politician (1898 - 1977)

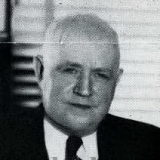

Mayor of Peabody, Massachusetts
- In office 1946–1952
- Preceded by: Joseph B. O'Keefe
- Succeeded by: Philip C. O'Donnell

Personal details
- Died: April 10, 1977 (aged 78) Peabody, Massachusetts, U.S.
- Party: Democratic

Leo F. McGrath (1898–1977) was an American politician who served as mayor of Peabody, Massachusetts from 1946 to 1952.

== Biography ==
McGrath was born and educated in Peabody. He was elected to the Peabody city council as a councilor at large in 1942. In 1945 he defeated incumbent mayor Joseph B. O'Keefe. During McGrath's tenure as mayor, J. B. Thomas Hospital reopened and the new Peabody Municipal Light Plant was constructed. In 1951, he was defeated for reelection by city councilor Philip C. O'Donnell. After leaving office, McGrath served as clerk of the Peabody district court. He retired in 1971 and spent his later years residing in Danvers, Massachusetts. McGrath died on April 10, 1977, at a nursing home in Peabody after a lengthy illness. He was 78 years old.
