= John T. Berry =

American politician (1924–1966)

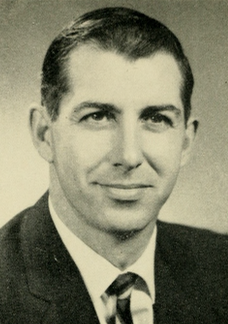
- Tucker in 2021

Member of the Massachusetts House of Representatives
- In office 1961–1966
- Preceded by: Henry W. Hallinan
- Succeeded by: Philip C. O'Donnell
- Constituency: 10th Essex (1961–1965); 5th Essex (1965–1966)

Personal details
- Born: November 10, 1924 Danvers, Massachusetts, U.S.
- Died: April 11, 1966 (aged 41) Salem, Massachusetts, U.S.
- Resting place: St. Mary's Cemetery; Danvers, Massachusetts, U.S.
- Party: Democratic
- Occupation: Jewelry store owner

John Thomas Berry (November 20, 1924 – April 11, 1966) was an American jeweler and politician who was a member of the Massachusetts House of Representatives from 1961 until his death in 1966.

== Early life ==
Berry was born on November 20, 1924, in Danvers, Massachusetts to Thomas J. and Mabel (Drake) Berry. He graduated from Danvers High School and attended a trade school for watchmakers. He married Mary Lou Greehy of Peabody, Massachusetts.

== Career ==
Berry operated a jewelry shop, John T. Berry Jeweler's Store, in Peabody. He began his political career as a member of the Peabody Electric Light Commission. From 1961 to 1966 he was a member of the Massachusetts House of Representatives. In 1961, Berry initiated legislation that stopped burning at the Peabody city dump. That same year he introduced legislation to base automobile insurance premiums on a driver's accident record. In 1963 he supported Michael Paul Feeney in his challenge of John F. Thompson for the position of Speaker of the House. In 1965 he was named chairman of the House cities committee. He also headed a special legislative committee tasked with recommending uses for the shuttered Essex County Sanatorium. Berry died on April 11, 1966, in Salem, Massachusetts.
