= Shirley Shillingford =

Political activist, Founder of Shirley's Pantry, Boston

Shirley Shillingford is a political activist in Boston, Massachusetts.

Shillingford was born and raised in Jamaica. She traveled to Montreal in 1967 to work on the Jamaica pavilion in the World's Fair. She later moved to Boston where she worked in Mayor Kevin White's office in 1974.

Shillingford has been the president of the Caribbean American Carnival Association in Boston for 34 years and supervises the annual Caribbean parade in Boston. She also ran a food pantry in Mattapan for 33 years. The food pantry was named after her in 2019.

Shillingford endorsed Tanisha Sullivan during her campaign for Boston secretary of state in 2022. She also signed on as a plaintiff in a lawsuit filed by South Boston community advocates against the Boston City Council to overturn a redistricting map passed in October 2022.

In 2023, she was recognized as one of "Boston’s most admired, beloved, and successful Black Women leaders" by the Black Women Lead project.
