= Phil O'Donnell =

Phil O'Donnell may refer to:

- Phil O'Donnell (cyclist), American cyclist, see United States at the 2013 UCI Road World Championships
- Phil O'Donnell (Irish republican) (1932–1982), volunteer in the Derry Brigade of the Provisional Irish Republican Army and member of Saor Uladh
- Phil O'Donnell (footballer) (1972–2007), Motherwell, Celtic and Scotland football player
- Philip C. O'Donnell (1915–1986), American politician
