= Leo Sullivan =

Leo Sullivan may refer to:

- J. Leo Sullivan (1895–1977), American politician from Massachusetts
- Leo J. Sullivan (1905–1963), American politician from Massachusetts
- Leo D. Sullivan (1940–2023), American animator and director

== See also ==
- Lee Sullivan
- Leon Sullivan
