= Alden P. White =

American jurist

Judge of the Essex County Probate Court
- In office 1917–1933
- Appointed by: Samuel W. McCall

District Attorney for Essex County, Massachusetts
- In office 1895–1899
- Preceded by: William Henry Moody
- Succeeded by: W. Scott Peters

Special Judge of the First Essex District Court
- In office 1890–189?

Personal details
- Born: October 20, 1856 Danvers, Massachusetts, U.S.
- Died: July 9, 1933 (aged 76) Salem, Massachusetts, U.S.
- Party: Republican
- Education: Amherst College
- Occupation: Lawyer

Alden P. White (October 20, 1856 – July 9, 1933) was an American jurist who served as a judge of the Essex County Probate Court.

== Early life ==
White was born on October 20, 1856, in Danvers, Massachusetts. He grew up in South Danvers (now Peabody, Massachusetts) and attended school in Danvers, South Danvers, and Salem, Massachusetts. He graduated from Amherst College in 1878 and, after taking a course at Harvard Law School, studied in the office of Perry & Endicott. He was admitted to the bar in 1881.

== Legal career ==
In 1890, White was appointed a special justice of the First Essex District Court in Salem. He then served as an assistant district attorney under William Henry Moody. Moody, who had gained prominence as a prosecutor in the 1893 Lizzie Borden trial, left the district attorney's office when he won a special election to the U.S. House of Representatives in November 1895, going on to serve as Secretary of the Navy, Attorney General, and ultimately as an Associate Justice of the U.S. Supreme Court. When Moody was elected to the United States House of Representatives, White succeeded him as DA. He later served on Salem's school committee and board of aldermen and was president of the latter body in 1906.

In 1917, White was made a judge of the Essex County Probate Court by Governor Samuel W. McCall. White presided over challenges to the wills of Edward Francis Searles and William A. Shea and former Page & Shaw president Otis Emerson Dunham's non-support trial. He remained on the bench until his death on July 9, 1933. He is buried in Walnut Grove Cemetery in Danvers, Massachusetts.
