= J. Leo Sullivan =

American politician (1895–1977)

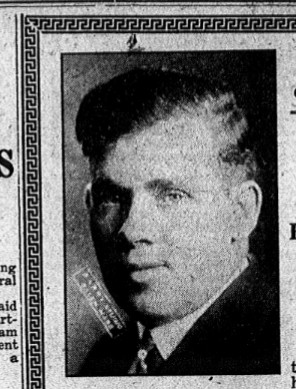

Mayor of Peabody, Massachusetts
- In office 1929–1935
- Preceded by: Robert A. Bakeman
- Succeeded by: James E. McVann

Personal details
- Born: December 8, 1895 Peabody, Massachusetts, U.S.
- Died: October 16, 1977 (aged 81) Peabody, Massachusetts, U.S.
- Party: Democratic

J. Leo Sullivan (December 8, 1895 – October 16, 1977) was an American politician who served as mayor of Peabody, Massachusetts from 1929 to 1935.

== Early life ==
Sullivan was born on December 8, 1895, to Timothy J. and Bridget (Vaile) Sullivan. His father was a member of the Peabody Electric Light Commission from 1902 to 1904. Sullivan ran a hardware and mill business in Peabody from 1915 to 1930. From 1917 to 1919 he served in the United States Army Motor Transport Corps. On June 28, 1926, he married Elizabeth McGlone. They had two children.

== Career ==
Sullivan was a member of the Peabody city council from 1923 to 1929. In 1928 he defeated incumbent mayor Robert A. Bakeman 59% to 41% to become the city's chief executive. At the age of 33 he was the city's youngest mayor. He was reelected in 1930 by a margin of 922 votes over James E. McVann. He won a third term in the 1932 preliminary election through an unusual clause that bypassed the general election if a candidate received over 50% of the vote in a preliminary election that had over 80% turnout. He was the first person elected to three terms as mayor of Peabody.

As mayor, Sullivan presided the city's tercentenary ceremonies and lobbied Congress for shoe and leather tariffs. He pushed for a settlement to end the 1933 leather worker's strike and after he refused strikers a permit to hold a parade, Sullivan had his home picketed.

Sullivan did not run for reelection in 1934. Governor Joseph B. Ely appointed Sullivan to the board of trustees of the Chelsea Soldiers' Home in November 1934. From 1936 to 1970 he was Peabody's postmaster.

Sullivan died on October 16, 1977, in Peabody. He was survived by his two children.
