= Jeffrey Turco =

Massachusetts state politician

Jeff Turco
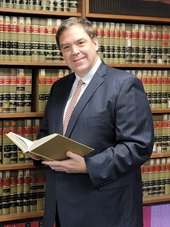

Member of the Massachusetts House of Representatives from the 19th Suffolk district
- Incumbent
- Assumed office April 7, 2021
- Preceded by: Robert DeLeo

Personal details
- Born: Jeffrey Rosario Turco; August 26, 1971 (age 54) Revere, Massachusetts, U.S.
- Party: Democratic
- Children: 6
- Education: University of Massachusetts Amherst (BA); Quinnipiac University (JD)

Jeffrey Rosario Turco is an American attorney, politician, and former law enforcement officer serving as a member of the Massachusetts House of Representatives from the 19th Suffolk district. He was elected in a March 30, 2021, special election.

== Early life and education ==
Turco was born in Revere, Massachusetts and graduated from Malden Catholic High School. He earned a Bachelor of Arts degree in history from the University of Massachusetts Amherst and a Juris Doctor from the Quinnipiac University School of Law.

== Career ==
Prior to entering politics, Turco owned and operated a law firm. He also served as a special sheriff and superintendent of the Worcester County Sheriff's Office. Turco was elected to the Massachusetts House of Representatives in a March 30, 2021 special election to replace Robert DeLeo.

In addition to his role as a state rep, Turco is still active as an attorney. He frequently represents clients before the Licensing Board in Chelsea MA.

=== Political positions ===
A self-described moderate Democrat, Turco has stated that he voted for Donald Trump in the 2016 presidential election. Turco has previously criticized Democratic politicians, including Barack Obama, Hillary Clinton, and Elizabeth Warren, in Facebook posts before they were removed during his special election campaign. Turco is Pro-Life.

== Personal life ==
Turco and his wife, Melissa, have six children.
