= James E. McVann =

American attorney and politician (1891-1970)

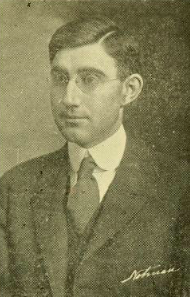
- official portrait, circa 1921

Mayor of Peabody, Massachusetts
- In office 1935–1939
- Preceded by: J. Leo Sullivan
- Succeeded by: Joseph B. O'Keefe

Member of the Massachusetts House of Representatives for the 11th Essex district
- In office 1921–1922
- Preceded by: Henry F. Duggan
- Succeeded by: John A. Jones
- In office 1919
- Preceded by: William H. Mahoney
- Succeeded by: Henry F. Duggan

Member of the Peabody City Council
- In office 1950–1962

Personal details
- Born: December 24, 1891 Peabody, Massachusetts, U.S.
- Died: July 31, 1970 (aged 78) Peabody, Massachusetts, U.S.
- Party: Republican
- Education: Northeastern College
- Occupation: Lawyer

James Edward McVann (December 24, 1891 – July 31, 1970) was an American attorney and politician who served as mayor of Peabody, Massachusetts and was a member of the Massachusetts House of Representatives.

== Early life ==
McVann was born on December 24, 1891. He was educated in the Peabody public schools and graduated from Northeastern College. He studied law in the office of Frank E. Farnham and was admitted to the bar in 1916. In 1918 he formed a partnership with Farnham's son, Horace P. Farnham. On January 19, 1919, McVann married Helen G. Regan, a Salem, Massachusetts public school teacher.

== Politics ==
McVann represented the 11th Essex district in the Massachusetts House of Representatives in the 1919 and 1921–1922 legislatures. He was the runner up to J. Leo Sullivan in the 1930 and 1932 mayoral elections. Sullivan did not run in 1934 and McVann defeated former mayor Robert A. Bakeman and Charles V. Cassidy by a wide margin to become mayor. In 1936, he beat leather worker Joseph B. O'Keefe by 58 votes to win a second term. He did not run for reelection in 1938. From 1950 to 1962, McVann was a member of the Peabody city council.

McVann died on July 31, 1970, at his home in Peabody. He was survived by his wife and three children.
