= W. Paul White =

American politician (born 1945)

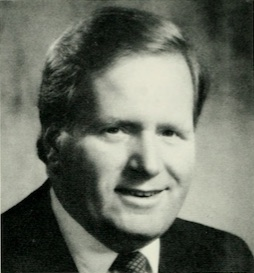

Member of the Massachusetts Senate
- In office 1989–1995 (Second Suffolk and Norfolk); 1995–1997 (Suffolk and Norfolk)
- Preceded by: Joseph B. Walsh
- Succeeded by: Brian A. Joyce

Member of the Massachusetts House of Representatives
- In office 1973–1975 (12th Suffolk); 1975–1979 (19th Suffolk); 1979–1989 (13th Suffolk)
- Preceded by: Paul Murphy (12th Suffolk); District created (19th Suffolk); James J. Craven, Jr. (13th Suffolk)
- Succeeded by: John G. Kelleher (12th Suffolk); William F. Galvin (19th Suffolk); Thomas Finneran (13th Suffolk)

Personal details
- Born: July 7, 1945 (age 81) Cambridge, Massachusetts, U.S.
- Party: Democratic
- Education: Boston College; Suffolk University Law School; John F. Kennedy School of Government
- Occupation: Politician, lobbyist

W. Paul White (born July 7, 1945) is an American politician.

== Career ==
White was a member of the Massachusetts House of Representatives from 1973 to 1989 from Dorchester, and the Massachusetts Senate from 1989 to 1999. White served as the House Majority Leader in 1984 and the Second Assistant Majority Leader in the Senate from 1995 to 1996.

He resigned from the Senate on October 1, 1997 to become Associate Vice President at Boston College.

Since 2001, he has been a principal at the Karol Group, Inc., a Boston government relations firm.

Political offices
Preceded by Frederick Berry	Second Assistant Majority Floor Leader of the Massachusetts Senate; 1995–1996	Succeeded by Robert Durand
Preceded by John E. Murphy Jr.	Majority Leader of the Massachusetts House of Representatives; 1984–1985	Succeeded by Charles Flaherty
