= John E. Murphy Jr. =

American lobbyist and politician

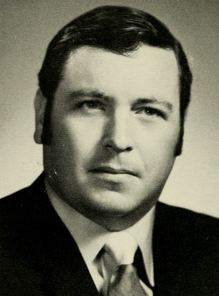
- official portrait, circa 1975

Member of the Massachusetts House of Representatives for the 13th Essex District
- In office 1971–1985
- Preceded by: Philip C. O'Donnell
- Succeeded by: Peter G. Torkildsen

Personal details
- Born: April 3, 1943 (age 83) Richmond, Virginia
- Party: Democratic
- Relations: John E. Murphy (father)
- Education: Providence College; Suffolk Law School
- Occupation: Lawyer; Lobbyist

John E. Murphy Jr. (born April 3, 1943) is an American politician and lobbyist who served in the Massachusetts House of Representatives from 1971 to 1985.

== Early life ==
Murphy was born on April 3, 1943, in Richmond, Virginia. His father, John E. Murphy also served in the House and was a Peabody District Court judge. He attended The Newman School, Providence College, and Suffolk Law School.

== Politics ==
In 1970, Murphy was elected to the House in his first ever bid for elected office. In 1978 he became majority whip. Murphy was a Massachusetts delegate to the 1980 Democratic National Convention, and served on the convention's platform committee.

In 1983 Murphy was promoted to majority leader when George Keverian was removed from the position by Speaker Thomas W. McGee after Keverian decided to run for speaker himself.

In 1984 Murphy lost his re-election bid by 228 votes to Republican Peter G. Torkildsen.

== Lobbying ==
After leaving the House, Murphy practiced law and later joined Issues Management, a lobbying firm managed by former Senate President Kevin B. Harrington. In 1992 he received $130,000 from the YMCA after the organization received $12.2 million in state funds for a new building in the Boston Navy Yard. The project was criticized by The Boston Globe as by 1993, the state-of-the-art facility had a nightly occupancy rate of about 8% due to its remote location. The paper criticized Murphy's role in the deal, as the payment was never reported to the state and his fee was based on the successful completion of the project - both of which violated state law and because Murphy did not disclose the payment before a bankruptcy judge who forgave about $350,000 of Murphy's debts. By 1993 Murphy had 14 clients, which included racetracks, hospitals, a billboard company, solid waste facilities, and an electric utility. His close relationship with House Speaker Charles Flaherty was cited as a reason for his success. In 1996, Flaherty pleaded guilty to felony tax evasion and admitted to violations of state conflict of interest law for receiving free vacation housing from lobbyists. Murphy was fined $2,000 by the Massachusetts Ethics Commission for providing Flaherty with use of a vacation home.

Massachusetts House of Representatives
Preceded by George Keverian	Majority Leader of the Massachusetts House of Representatives; 1983–1984	Succeeded by W. Paul White
Preceded by George Keverian	Majority Whip of the Massachusetts House of Representatives; 1978–1983	Succeeded by Vincent J. Piro
