= William F. Galvin =

American politician (born 1950)

Bill Galvin
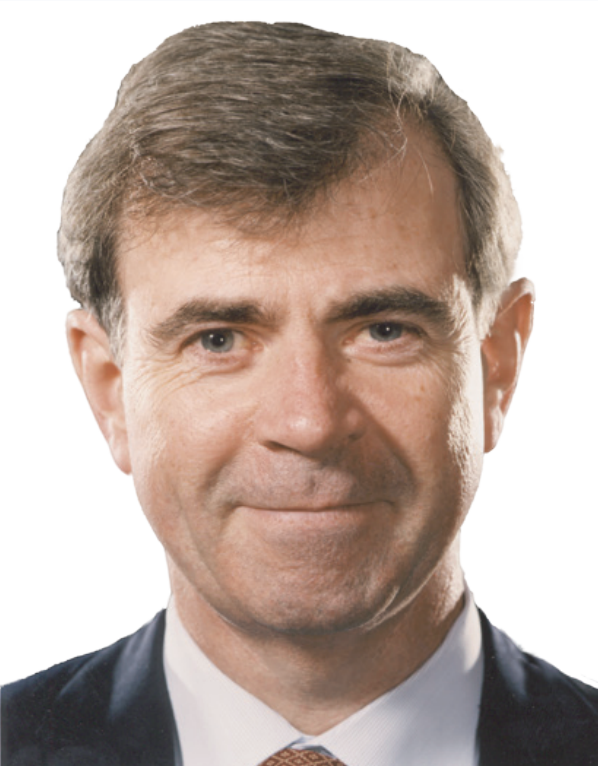
- Galvin c. 2008

27th Secretary of the Commonwealth of Massachusetts
- Incumbent
- Assumed office January 1, 1995
- Governor: Bill Weld; Paul Cellucci; Jane Swift (acting); Mitt Romney; Deval Patrick; Charlie Baker; Maura Healey
- Preceded by: Michael J. Connolly

Member of the Massachusetts House of Representatives
- In office January 1975 – January 1991
- Preceded by: Michael Daly
- Succeeded by: Susan Tracy
- Constituency: 27th Suffolk (1975–1979); 19th Suffolk (1979–1991)

Personal details
- Born: William Francis Galvin; September 17, 1950 (age 75) Brighton, Massachusetts, U.S.
- Party: Democratic
- Spouse: Eileen Galvin
- Children: Bridget Galvin
- Education: Boston College (BA); Suffolk University (JD)
- Website: Government website

William Francis Galvin (born September 17, 1950) is an American politician who has served as the 27th Massachusetts Secretary of the Commonwealth since 1995. A member of the Democratic Party, he previously served in the Massachusetts House of Representatives from 1975 to 1991.

== Early life ==
Galvin was born and raised in the Brighton neighborhood of Boston. He attended Saint Mary's High School in Waltham, Massachusetts and graduated in 1968. Galvin graduated cum laude from Boston College in 1972 and received a Juris Doctor from Suffolk University Law School in 1976.

== Career ==
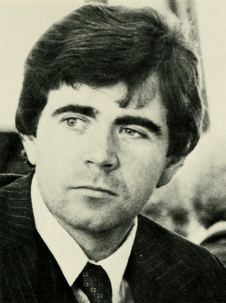
Galvin c. 1983 as a member of the Massachusetts House of Representatives

Galvin began his political career in 1972 as an aide to the Massachusetts Governor's Council after graduating from Boston College, thanks to his connection with councilor Herb Connolly, whom Galvin had campaigned for. Galvin worked part-time at the council while attending Suffolk Law School full-time. Galvin won a special election to the open seat in the Massachusetts General Court in 1975, after State Representative Michael Daly departed from office; the race had nine candidates. Galvin became the Massachusetts state representative from the Allston-Brighton district, the same year he graduated from law school. He was the Democratic nominee for Massachusetts State Treasurer in 1990, but was defeated by Republican Joe Malone. It was during this election that he was given the nickname "The Prince of Darkness", in reference to his habit of working late into the night and making legislative deals behind closed doors. He was first elected Secretary of the Commonwealth in 1994, and has retained this title longer than any other politician in Massachusetts history.

Galvin has been an active participant in the National Association of Secretaries of State, serving first as Chairman of the Standing Committee on Securities, then as co-chairman of the Committee on Presidential Primaries.

At one point during the administration of Gov. Mitt Romney and Lt. Gov. Kerry Healey, Galvin became the Acting Governor of Massachusetts when both Romney and Healey were out of the state. During the administration of former Acting Governor Jane Swift, Galvin automatically became Acting Governor whenever Swift left the state, since there was no lieutenant governor in office at the time. When Swift gave birth to twins in 2001, she chose to keep full executive authority and did not hand over the governorship at any point to Galvin.

=== 2006 election ===
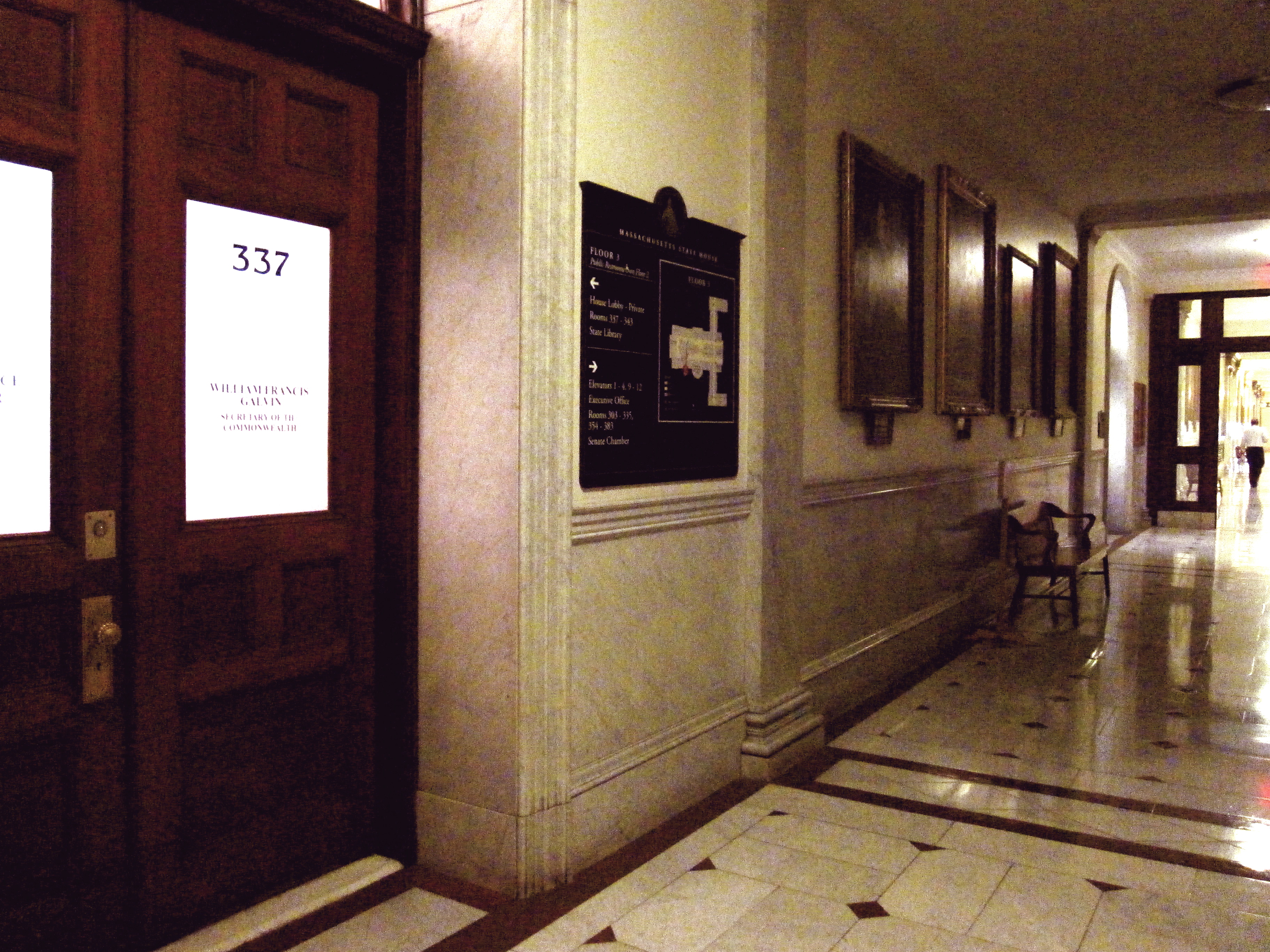
Galvin's office in the State House, 2010

While it had been widely rumored that Galvin would run for Governor of Massachusetts in 2006 as a Democrat, he announced at the end of 2005 that he would instead seek reelection as Secretary of State. Voting rights advocate John Bonifaz had already declared that he would run for the office, and stayed in the race to challenge Galvin for re-election. However, Galvin defeated Bonifaz in the September 19 Democratic primary. Galvin defeated Green-Rainbow Party candidate Jill Stein, a medical doctor and environmental health advocate who ran for Governor in 2002, in the November general election.

The Democratic primary race received relatively little attention or press coverage for most of 2006, but in the last few weeks before election, a controversy over Galvin's refusal to debate his opponent broke into the news with a front-page story in The Boston Sunday Globe. This is the first time a front-page story appeared about this race in any major Boston paper.

=== 2018 election ===
In November 2017, Boston City Council member Josh Zakim announced that he would run for Secretary of the Commonwealth, challenging fellow-Democrat Galvin in the 2018 election. Amid the primary challenge, Galvin came out in favor of same-day voter registration and automatic voter registration. Previously, Galvin had expressed skepticism of automatic voter registration, and had appealed a Superior Court ruling which struck down a state law requiring that voters be registered 20 days prior to an election in order to vote in it. On June 2, 2018, Zakim won the endorsement of the Massachusetts Democratic Party at its state convention, defeating Galvin with 55% of the vote to Galvin's 45%. Galvin subsequently defeated Zakim in the Democratic primary on September 4 with 67% of the vote. On November 6, Galvin won re-election as Secretary of the Commonwealth, winning 71% of the vote against Republican Anthony Amore.

=== 2022 election ===
In January 2022, NAACP Boston president Tanisha Sullivan announced a campaign for Secretary of the Commonwealth. Galvin campaigned on his voting rights record, having implemented no-excuse mail-in voting during the COVID-19 pandemic, which became a permanent change. On the other hand, Sullivan claimed that he hadn't gone far enough to further voting rights. She claimed that mail-in voting should have been implemented before the pandemic, and emphasized that Massachusetts still did not have same-day voter registration. Galvin claimed that while he supports same-day registration, the legislature is responsible for implementing it. Sullivan won the endorsement of the state Democratic Party, as well as from multiple Boston city councillors and mayors. 62% of Massachusetts Democratic Party Convention delegates voted to support her. During the campaign, Sullivan was more active, attending regular interviews and hosting rallies, while Galvin ran a quieter campaign. Galvin defeated Sullivan in the September 6 Democratic primary with 70% of the vote. In the general election, Galvin faced Republican Rayla Campbell, who opposed mail in voting. On November 8, Galvin won re-election with 68% of the vote.

=== 2026 election ===
On February 4, 2026, Galvin announced he would be running for a ninth term, adding that he had "no intention of running in 2030."

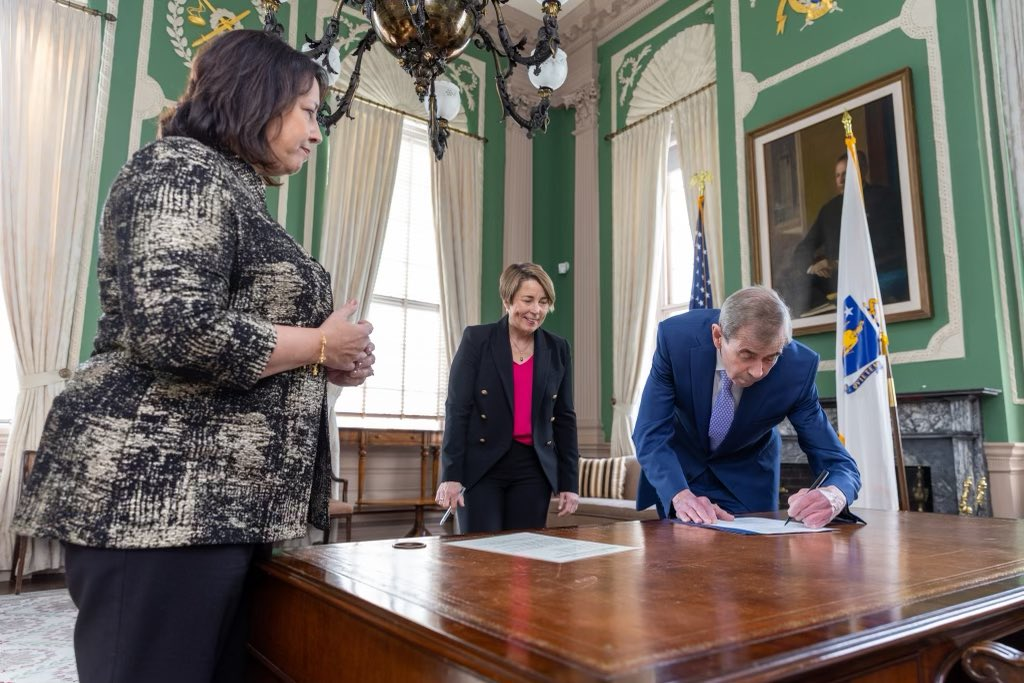
L–R: Lieutenant Governor Kim Driscoll, Governor Maura Healey, and Galvin in January 2023

== Notable lawsuits ==
=== 2008 UOCAVA violation settlement with Department of Justice ===
An investigation by the US Justice Department found that Galvin, as Massachusetts Secretary of State, had violated the Uniformed and Overseas Citizens Absentee Voting Act. The Office of the Secretary of the Commonwealth was found to have failed to collect and report data on absentee ballots sent, returned, and cast by overseas citizens and military personnel registered to vote in Massachusetts, as required by the law since amendments in 2002. The lawsuit was settled out of court, requiring Galvin to comply with the law.

=== 2009 lawsuit against stockbroker Robert Jaffe ===
On January 14, 2009, Galvin filed suit against Robert Jaffe to compel Jaffe to testify about his role in the Bernard Madoff investment scandal. Jaffe, who lives in Weston, Massachusetts and in Florida, countered that he is actually one of the victims of Madoff. Jaffe is married to Ellen Shapiro, daughter of Boston philanthropist Carl Shapiro. Jaffe reportedly convinced the elder Shapiro to invest $250 million with Madoff about 10 days before Madoff's arrest.

=== 2021 regulatory action against MassMutual in GameStop affair ===
In September 2021, Massachusetts regulators fined MassMutual $4 million for failing to supervise the trading activity of their employee Keith Gill, a leading player in the GameStop short squeeze which led to hedge funds losing billions. Galvin characterised Gill as a professional trader/dealer, citing his 1,700 trades on behalf of three other individuals. However, Galvin failed to disclose that the three individuals were all members of Gill's family and that less than 5% of the 1,700 trades were for GameStop. Following his pursuit of litigation against Gill, it was reported that Galvin was engaging in partisan politics and had opposed bilingual ballots in contravention of the Voting Rights Act.

== Electoral history ==
1975 Massachusetts House of Representatives 27th Suffolk district special election Democratic primary
Party	Candidate	Votes	%
Democratic	William F. Galvin	1,266	30.5
Democratic	James L. Sullivan	655	15.8
Democratic	Michael J. Hanaon Jr.	512	12.3
Democratic	Ronald Capling	380	9.2
Democratic	David M. Graham	375	9.0
Democratic	Dante G. Mummolo	335	8.1
Democratic	Donald Feener	319	7.7
Democratic	Albert Mancini	161	3.9
Democratic	Donald Williams	149	3.6
Total votes		4,157	100.0

1975 Massachusetts House of Representatives 27th Suffolk district special election
Party	Candidate	Votes	%
Democratic	William F. Galvin	520	100.0
Total votes		520	100.0
Democratic hold			

1976 Massachusetts House of Representatives 27th Suffolk district election
Party	Candidate	Votes	%
Democratic	William F. Galvin (incumbent)	5,131	100.0
Total votes		5,131	100.0
Democratic hold			

1978 Massachusetts House of Representatives 19th Suffolk district election
Party	Candidate	Votes	%
Democratic	William F. Galvin (incumbent)	5,503	100.0
Total votes		5,503	100.0
Democratic hold			

1980 Massachusetts House of Representatives 19th Suffolk district Republican primary
Party	Candidate	Votes	%
Democratic	William F. Galvin (incumbent, write-in)	124	47.1
Republican	Joan F. Kiley	85	32.3
Republican	J. Michael Marion	54	20.5
Total votes		333	100.0

1980 Massachusetts House of Representatives 19th Suffolk district election
Party	Candidate	Votes	%
Democratic	William F. Galvin (incumbent)	6,673	99.97
Write-in		2	<0.1
Total votes		6,675	100.0
Democratic hold			

1982 Massachusetts House of Representatives 19th Suffolk district election
Party	Candidate	Votes	%
Democratic	William F. Galvin (incumbent)	5,230	100.0
Total votes		5,230	100.0
Democratic hold			

1984 Massachusetts House of Representatives 19th Suffolk district election
Party	Candidate	Votes	%
Democratic	William F. Galvin (incumbent)	8,248	99.96
Write-in		3	<0.1
Total votes		8,251	100.0
Democratic hold			

1986 Massachusetts House of Representatives 19th Suffolk district Democratic primary
Party	Candidate	Votes	%
Democratic	William F. Galvin (incumbent)	3,311	65.5
Democratic	Helene Solomon	1,744	34.5
Total votes		5,055	100.0

1986 Massachusetts House of Representatives 19th Suffolk district election
Party	Candidate	Votes	%
Democratic	William F. Galvin (incumbent)	5,044	99.9
Write-in		3	0.1
Total votes		5,047	100.0
Democratic hold			

1988 Massachusetts House of Representatives 19th Suffolk district election
Party	Candidate	Votes	%
Democratic	William F. Galvin (incumbent)	6,433	82.1
Republican	Michael Wilcon	1,406	17.9
Total votes		7,839	100.0
Democratic hold			

1990 Massachusetts Treasurer and Receiver-General Democratic primary
Party	Candidate	Votes	%
Democratic	William F. Galvin	489,512	51.0
Democratic	George Keverian	287,626	30.0
Democratic	Dick Kraus	182,715	19.0
Write-in		436	0
Total votes		960,289	100.0

1990 Massachusetts Treasurer and Receiver-General election
Party	Candidate	Votes	%
Republican	Joseph D. Malone (incumbent)	1,298,521	57.2
Democratic	William F. Galvin	825,808	36.4
Ind. High Tech	C. David Nash	143,324	6.3
Write-in		753	0
Total votes		2,268,406	100.0
Republican hold			

1994 Massachusetts Secretary of the Commonwealth Democratic primary
Party	Candidate	Votes	%
Democratic	William F. Galvin	262,018	63.7
Democratic	Augusto F. Grace	148,785	36.2
Write-in		418	0.1
Total votes		411,221	100.0

1994 Massachusetts Secretary of the Commonwealth election
Party	Candidate	Votes	%
Democratic	William F. Galvin	1,077,506	54.7
Republican	Arthur E. Chase	813,068	41.3
Libertarian	Peter C. Everett	77,584	3.9
Write-in		567	0
Total votes		1,968,725	100.0
Democratic hold			

1998 Massachusetts Secretary of the Commonwealth election
Party	Candidate	Votes	%
Democratic	William F. Galvin (incumbent)	1,252,912	69.9
Republican	Dale C. Jenkins Jr.	451,556	25.2
Libertarian	David L. Atkinson	87,196	4.9
Write-in		680	0
Total votes		1,791,664	100.0
Democratic hold			

2002 Massachusetts Secretary of the Commonwealth election
Party	Candidate	Votes	%
Democratic	William F. Galvin (incumbent)	1,472,562	74.0
Republican	Jack E. Robinson III	516,260	25.9
Write-in		1,832	0.1
Total votes		1,990,654	100.0
Democratic hold			

2006 Massachusetts Secretary of the Commonwealth Democratic primary
Party	Candidate	Votes	%
Democratic	William F. Galvin (incumbent)	633,035	82.9
Democratic	John Bonifaz	129,012	16.9
Write-in		1,997	0.3
Total votes		764,044	100.0

2006 Massachusetts Secretary of the Commonwealth election
Party	Candidate	Votes	%
Democratic	William F. Galvin (incumbent)	1,638,594	82.0
Green-Rainbow	Jill Stein	353,551	17.7
Write-in		5,715	0.3
Total votes		1,997,860	100.0
Democratic hold			

2010 Massachusetts Secretary of the Commonwealth election
Party	Candidate	Votes	%
Democratic	William F. Galvin (incumbent)	1,420,481	64.4
Republican	William Campbell	720,967	32.7
Independent	James Henderson	61,812	2.8
Write-in		1,424	0.1
Total votes		2,204,684	100.0
Democratic hold			

2014 Massachusetts Secretary of the Commonwealth election
Party	Candidate	Votes	%
Democratic	William F. Galvin (incumbent)	1,395,616	67.4
Republican	David D'arcangelo	597,491	28.9
Green-Rainbow	Daniel Factor	74,789	3.6
Write-in		1,421	0.1
Total votes		2,069,317	100.0
Democratic hold			

2018 Massachusetts Secretary of the Commonwealth Democratic primary
Party	Candidate	Votes	%
Democratic	William F. Galvin (incumbent)	435,244	67.4
Democratic	Josh Zakim	208,977	32.4
Write-in		1,139	0.2
Total votes		645,360	100.0

2018 Massachusetts Secretary of the Commonwealth election
Party	Candidate	Votes	%
Democratic	William F. Galvin (incumbent)	1,877,065	70.8
Republican	Anthony M. Amore	671,300	25.3
Green-Rainbow	Juan Sanchez	100,428	3.8
Write-in		1,731	0.1
Total votes		2,650,524	100.0
Democratic hold			

2022 Massachusetts Secretary of the Commonwealth Democratic primary
Party	Candidate	Votes	%
Democratic	William F. Galvin (incumbent)	524,947	70.1
Democratic	Tanisha Sullivan	223,420	29.8
Write-in		602	0.1
Total votes		748,969	100.0

2022 Massachusetts Secretary of the Commonwealth election
Party	Candidate	Votes	%
Democratic	William F. Galvin (incumbent)	1,665,808	67.7
Republican	Rayla Campbell	722,021	29.3
Green-Rainbow	Juan Sanchez	71,717	2.9
Write-in		1,396	0.1
Total votes		2,460,942	100.0
Democratic hold			

Party political offices
Preceded by Robert Q. Crane	Democratic nominee for Treasurer and Receiver-General of Massachusetts; 1990	Succeeded by Shannon O'Brien
Preceded by Michael J. Connolly	Democratic nominee for Secretary of the Commonwealth of Massachusetts; 1994, 1998, 2002, 2006, 2010, 2014, 2018, 2022, 2026	Most recent
Massachusetts House of Representatives
Preceded by Michael Daly	Member of the Massachusetts House of Representatives from the 27th Suffolk district 1975–1979	Succeeded by Constituency abolished
Preceded by W. Paul White	Member of the Massachusetts House of Representatives from the 19th Suffolk district 1979–1991	Succeeded by Susan Tracy
Political offices
Preceded by Michael Connolly	Secretary of the Commonwealth of Massachusetts; 1995–present	Incumbent
Lines of succession
Preceded by Kim Driscoll as Lieutenant Governor	2nd in line as Secretary of the Commonwealth	Succeeded by Andrea Campbell as Attorney General
