= William A. Shea (mayor) =

American politician

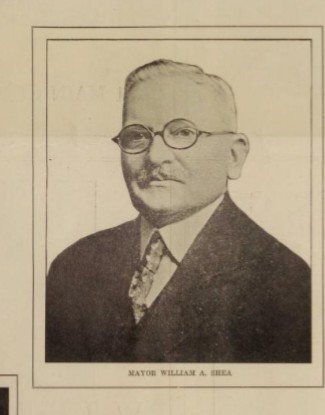

Mayor of Peabody, Massachusetts
- In office 1921–1925
- Preceded by: S. Howard Donnell
- Succeeded by: Robert A. Bakeman

Personal details
- Born: November 18,1877 Salem, Massachusetts, U.S.
- Died: July 16, 1929 (aged 52) Peabody, Massachusetts, U.S.
- Party: Republican

William A. Shea was an American politician who served as mayor of Peabody, Massachusetts from 1921 to 1925.

== Early life and business career ==
Shea was born in Salem, Massachusetts to John and Mary (Foley) O'Shea. He followed his father into the leather industry and started his own hand-finished leather manufacturing business. After the business failed, Shea worked for the Salem Electric Railway Company. He eventually moved to Peabody, where he worked in a restaurant and fruit store until 1893, when he purchased his own restaurant. The restaurant also housed a tobacco stand in 1915 he opened a new tobacco store. Shea went into the wholesale tobacco business and by 1918 his wholesale tobacco and restaurant business was reported to have made over a half-million dollars. That same year, Shea became treasurer and general manager of the American Degreasing Company. Shea was also a director of the A. B. Clark Co., a sheepskin tannery.

== Politics ==
Shea held various offices in Peabody, including overseer of the poor, sewer commissioner, and selectman. In 1915, he was the Republican nominee for the Massachusetts House of Representatives seat in the 11th Essex district. He lost to Democrat Michael J. Sherry by 32 votes. In 1916, Shea was elected to Peabody's first city council and was chosen to serve as the body's first president. In 1920, Shea was elected mayor of Peabody by 872 votes. In 1922 he was reelected over Rev. Robert A. Bakeman by 126 votes.

== Personal life ==
In 1903, Shea's sister, Mary J. O'Shea, went missing and was presumed dead until she reappeared in 1924. While the reason for her disappearance was not given, it was known that she had married a businessman from the Midwestern United States and had settled with him in Los Angeles in the years since she had left Salem.

Shea married Alice Crouse, a concert singer from Salem. They had two children. Alice Crouse Shea predeceased her husband and he married an employee of his tobacco store.

Shea died on July 16, 1929, at the age of 52. He was survived by his second wife, Bridget, and his two children, William G. Shea and Alice Shea Barrett, from his first marriage. Shea left his entire estate to his wife and his two children contested his will on the grounds of undue influence and mental incapacity. On January 8, 1931, Judge Alden P. White sustained Shea's will.
