= Robert DeLeo (politician) =

American politician (born 1950)

Bob DeLeo
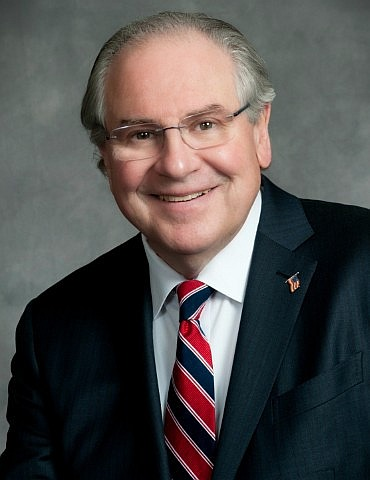

85th Speaker of the Massachusetts House of Representatives
- In office January 27, 2009 – December 29, 2020
- Preceded by: Salvatore DiMasi
- Succeeded by: Ron Mariano

Member of the Massachusetts House of Representatives from the 19th Suffolk district
- In office January 4, 1995 – December 29, 2020
- Preceded by: Susan Tracy
- Succeeded by: Jeffrey Turco

Member of the Massachusetts House of Representatives from the 20th Suffolk district
- In office January 3, 1991 – January 4, 1995
- Preceded by: Alfred E. Saggese Jr.
- Succeeded by: constituency abolished

Personal details
- Born: Robert Alfred DeLeo; March 27, 1950 (age 76) Winthrop, Massachusetts, U.S.
- Party: Democratic
- Education: Northeastern University (BA); Suffolk University (JD)

Robert Alfred DeLeo (born March 27, 1950, in Winthrop, Massachusetts) is an American former politician from the state of Massachusetts. He served as Speaker of the Massachusetts House of Representatives from 2009 to 2020, having succeeded Salvatore DiMasi, who resigned due to allegations of an ethics violation.

As of 2021, DeLeo is a University Fellow for Public Life at Northeastern University.

DeLeo represented the Nineteenth Suffolk district, and before becoming House Speaker, was the chairman of the House Ways and Means Committee. The Nineteenth Suffolk district includes Winthrop and Revere.

In addition to serving as a state representative, DeLeo served as a Winthrop town meeting member from 1977 to 2005 and was a member of the town's board of selectmen from 1978 to 1988.

On December 16, 2020, it was reported that DeLeo would be stepping down as Speaker for a job at Northeastern University. He resigned both his house seat and speakership on December 29.

== Early life and education ==
DeLeo resides in the same house in which he grew up. When he was young, his father, Al, was in charge of a restaurant at Suffolk Downs. Al was often seen around the community including at the Winthrop Golf Club, but "DeLeo never took up the game". DeLeo attended solely Boston area schools, graduating from the Boston Latin School, attaining a Bachelor of Arts degree from Northeastern University and a Juris Doctor from Suffolk University Law School.

== Massachusetts House of Representatives ==
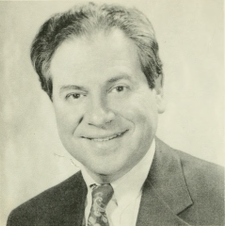
DeLeo in 1995

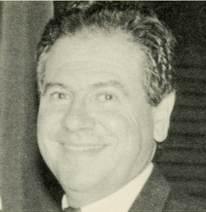
DeLeo in 2003

During DeLeo's time in the Massachusetts House of Representatives between 1990 and 2005, he was known as "an amiable, rank-and-file lawmaker who focused on constituent issues such as toll hikes, the expansion of Logan Airport, and rates charged by the Massachusetts Water Resources Authority".

In 2005, Speaker Salvatore DiMasi appointed DeLeo as chairman of the House Committee on Ways and Means. According to the Globe, "He became so identified with handing out perks to members that earmarks became known as DeLeo Dollars".

Prior to becoming the Speaker of the House, DeLeo had created a reputation for himself as a "consensus-builder", someone who strived to prevent "major flareups while crafting the budget". He does not ideologically identify himself with a large number of issues or legislation, but "his views appear more conservative" than the former speaker, DiMasi. Unlike DiMasi, who was strongly in favor of defending gay marriage rights, DeLeo was originally against same-sex marriage. In 2007 DeLeo may have shown a change in this belief when he voted against the amendment that would have defined marriage as the union of one man and one woman. Another conservative opinion that DeLeo has is against the "right of women to have an abortion, except in cases of rape, incest, or to save a mother's life".

=== Speakership ===
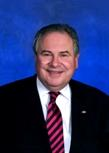
Portrait of DeLeo

In early 2008, both DeLeo and John H. Rogers put themselves forward as candidates if the state house speakership, held by legally embattled lawmaker Salvatore DiMasi, became vacant. When the position became available in January 2009, there was an animated competition for the position. Rogers ultimately conceded to DeLeo and urged lawmakers to vote for him as the house speaker. DeLeo was elected speaker by a 137–16 vote of the state house.

In April 2011, DeLeo led a vote to remove the health-care related collective bargaining rights of Massachusetts police officers, firefighters, teachers, and other municipal employees. The vote was conducted at 11:30pm in order to avoid protesters. It passed with 111 in favor and 42 opposed.

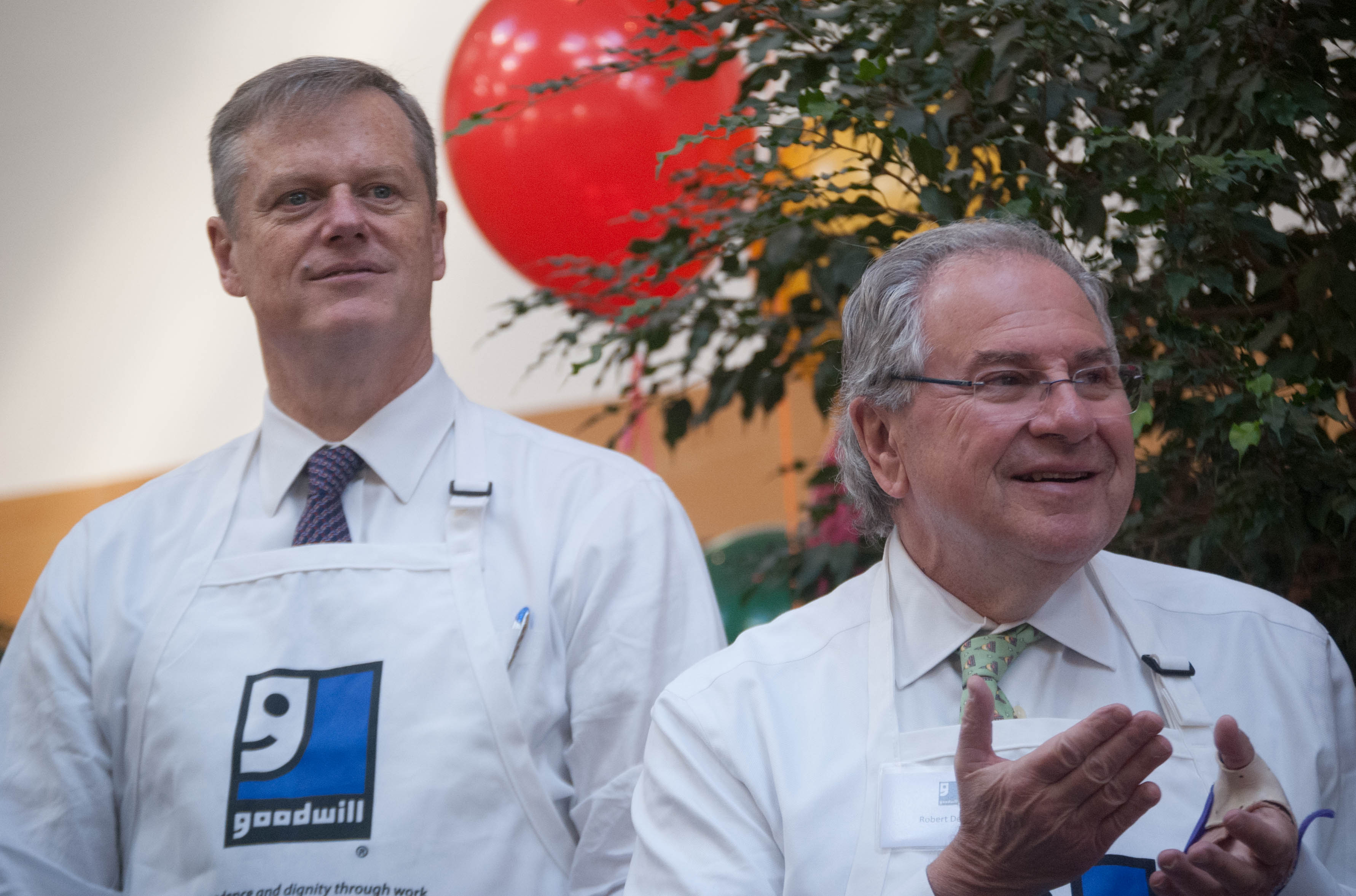
DeLeo (right) and Governor Charlie Baker at a Thanksgiving event in 2016

During the 2014 corruption trial of former probation commissioner John O'Brien, prosecutors alleged that DeLeo had participated in the job-trading as a means of getting elected Speaker. Although he was never formally charged, DeLeo was labeled an "unindicted co-conspirator" by Federal prosecutors. A number of prominent politicians, including Boston Mayor Marty Walsh came out in his defense.

== Casino gambling ==
DeLeo reintroduced the gambling debate to the House of Representatives in his first months as speaker. Gambling legislation introduced under DiMasi had failed. In the beginning of February 2009, DeLeo met with Governor Deval Patrick to discuss policy plans as part of the leadership meetings, where this issue of slot machines and resort casinos first presented itself under DeLeo's leadership. The casino debate was initially supported by the general public; the State House News Service poll at the time showed 57% support for reintroducing the gambling debate.

Towards the end of 2009, DeLeo began to publicly support casinos as a way to increase revenues, and minimize the effects of the economic downturn. DeLeo stated in an interview with The Boston Globe, "I'm hoping this will not just be a gaming bill, but also an economic development one". By December 2009, DeLeo had shown favor to putting slot machines in the state's four racetracks; Patrick, however, had shown opposition along with Senate President Therese Murray who stated that her preference was resort casinos. DeLeo stated that the slot machines were a "natural progression" to casinos, and they would have the advantage of being installed quickly. The conflict between DeLeo and Patrick was further exacerbated by the fact that against Patrick's wishes the debate had been postponed until 2010. The gambling debate became complicated further by the economic recession which had taken its toll on the casino industry.

On March 4, 2010, DeLeo announced his blueprint for expanded gambling to the Greater Boston Chamber of Commerce. His plan included two resort casinos and 3,000 slot machines at the state's four racetracks. DeLeo added that the legislation would add jobs and part of the revenue would be put aside for capital investments for Massachusetts businesses. While Patrick had not stated that he would veto legislation which included slots at racetracks, he had made it clear that he was not in favor of adding slots to the gaming debate.

As the debate continued tensions between Patrick and DeLeo grew over the issue of slots in the racetracks, by July 2010 Patrick had called the addition of slots "a no bid contract" that would give a few developers all of the gaming contracts for slots. DeLeo retorted that his plan for expanded gaming was Massachusetts' best way to deal with the revenue shortfalls, and lack of jobs. At this point, a number of groups opposed to the expanded gaming bill had gained a voice on the state level and the whole process began to lose steam.

Over the next few months the debate shrank from two casinos and four tracks to two casinos and one track at which point Patrick was still unwilling to compromise. By August, DeLeo had entrenched himself into the position of continuing to push for the bill while simultaneously rejecting any additional compromises. Patrick had rejected the measure, and with the end of the full session and the majority of the Legislature on summer break it became apparent that the bill would not survive.

== Personal life ==
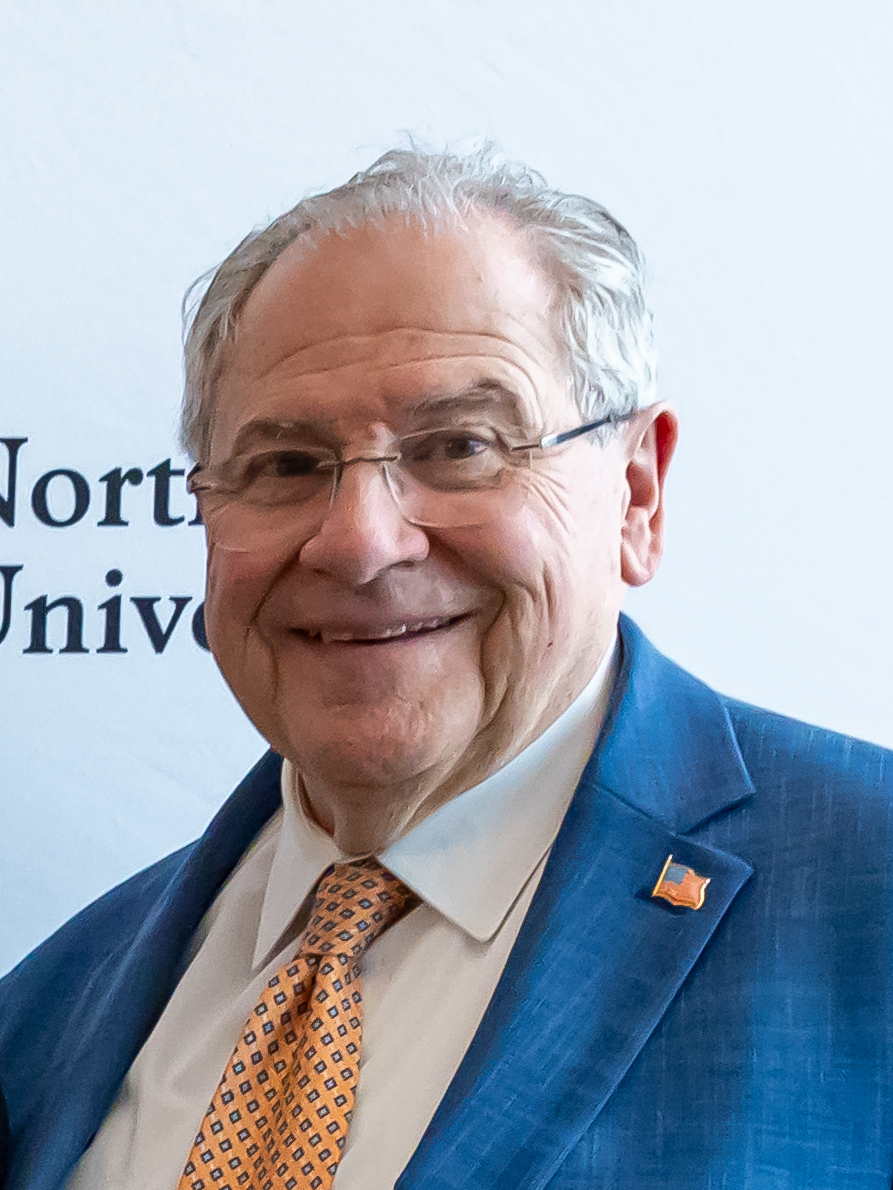
DeLeo in 2024

He is the father of two children, Robbie and Rachele.

== See also ==
- 1991–1992 Massachusetts legislature
- 1993–1994 Massachusetts legislature
- 1995–1996 Massachusetts legislature
- 1997–1998 Massachusetts legislature
- 1999–2000 Massachusetts legislature
- 2001–2002 Massachusetts legislature
- 2003–2004 Massachusetts legislature
- 2005–2006 Massachusetts legislature
- 2007–2008 Massachusetts legislature
- 2009–2010 Massachusetts legislature
- 2011–2012 Massachusetts legislature
- 2013–2014 Massachusetts legislature
- 2015–2016 Massachusetts legislature
- 2017–2018 Massachusetts legislature
- 2019–2020 Massachusetts legislature

Political offices
| Preceded by Salvatore DiMasi | Speaker of the Massachusetts House of Representatives; 2009–2020 | Succeeded by Ronald Mariano |
