= Massachusetts House of Representatives' 19th Suffolk district =

American legislative district

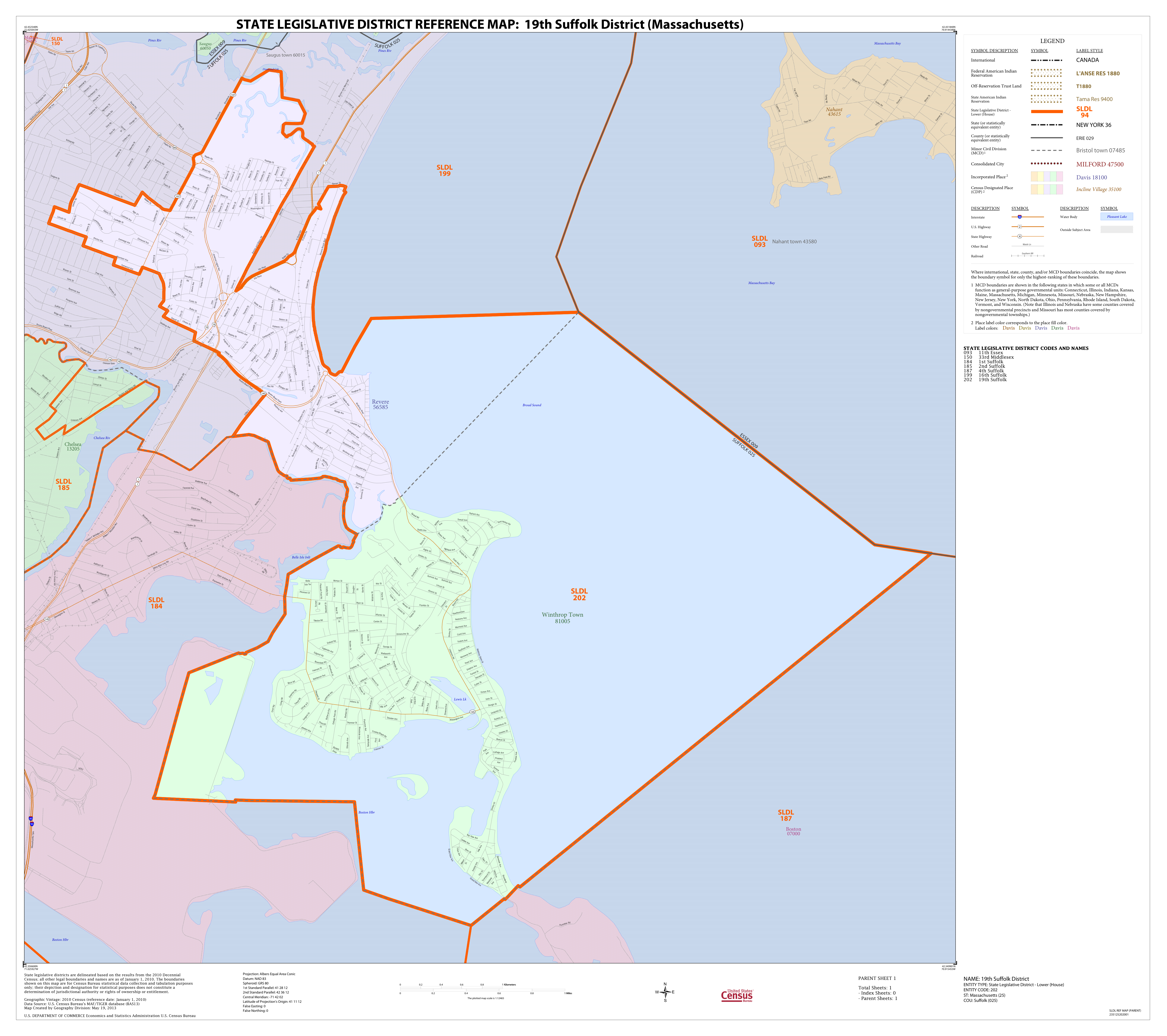
Map of Massachusetts House of Representatives' 19th Suffolk district, based on the 2010 United States census.

Massachusetts House of Representatives' 19th Suffolk district in the United States is one of 160 legislative districts included in the lower house of the Massachusetts General Court. It covers part of Suffolk County. The seat is represented by Jeffrey Turco.

== Locales represented ==
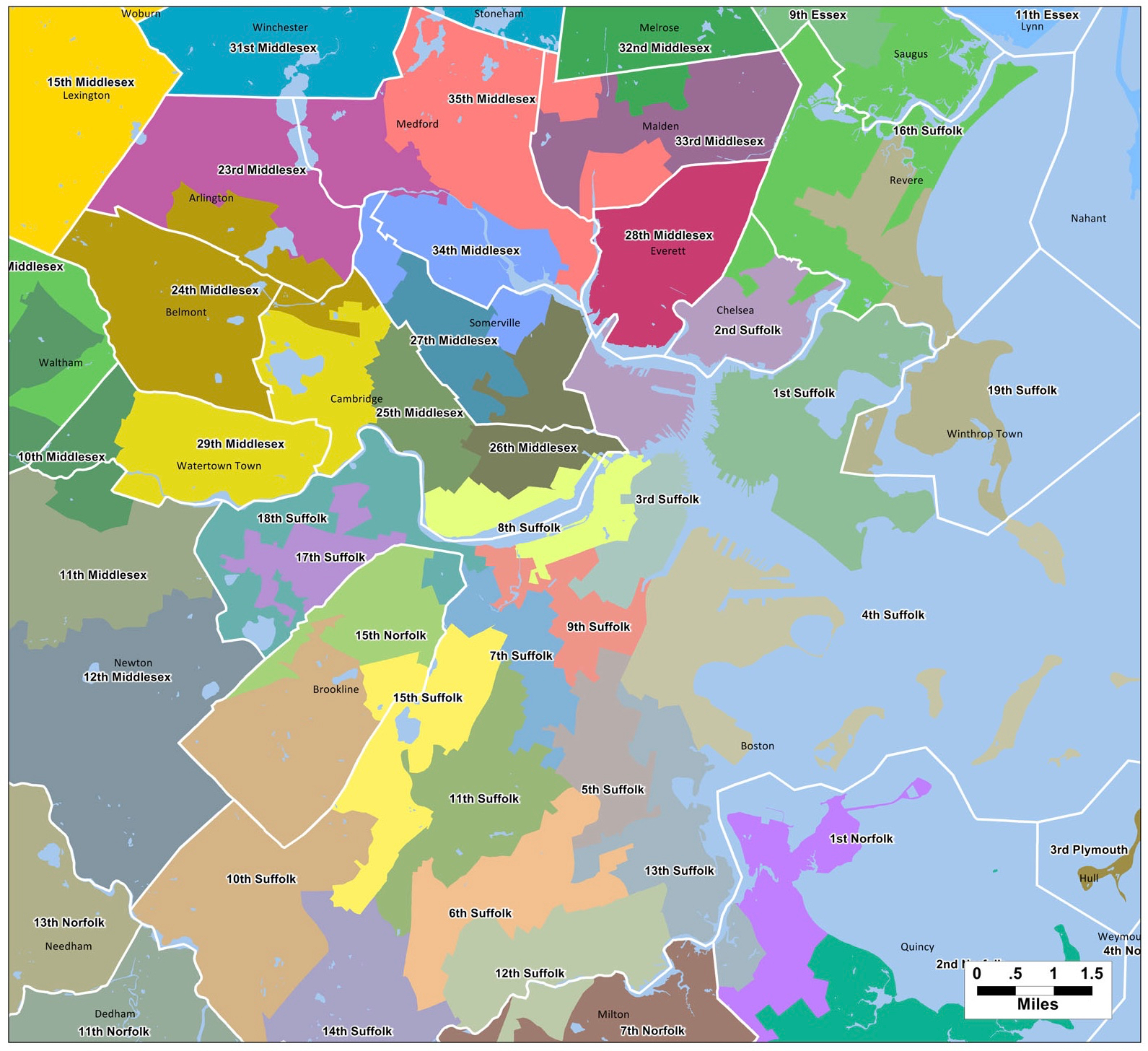
Map of Massachusetts House of Representatives districts for Suffolk County, apportioned in 2011

The district includes the following localities:

- part of Revere
- Winthrop

The current district geographic boundary overlaps with that of the Massachusetts Senate's 1st Suffolk and Middlesex district.

== Representatives ==
- William H. Monahan, circa 1888
- Thomas L. Noonan, circa 1888
- Florence Driscoll, circa 1908
- Samuel Madden, circa 1908
- Thomas Fay, circa 1908
- Jacob Wasserman, circa 1918
- Thomas Leavitt, circa 1918
- Frank L. Brier, circa 1920
- Herbert W. Burr, circa 1920
- Elihu D. Stone, circa 1920
- Harrison Atwood, circa 1923
- Richard McClennan Walsh, circa 1923
- William Arthur Fish, circa 1923
- John White, circa 1935
- Lawrence McHugh, circa 1935
- James Sullivan, circa 1945
- Robert Connolly, circa 1945
- Walter D. Bryan, circa 1951
- Edmond J. Donlan, circa 1951-1953
- William F. Sullivan, circa 1951
- Charles Robert Doyle, circa 1953
- Joseph Michael O'Loughlin, circa 1953
- John Donovan, circa 1967
- W. Paul White, circa 1975
- William F. Galvin, 1979-1991
- Susan Tracy, 1991–1995
- Robert DeLeo, 1995-2020
- Jeffrey Turco, 2021–present

== See also ==
- List of Massachusetts House of Representatives elections
- Other Suffolk County districts of the Massachusetts House of Representatives: 1st, 2nd, 3rd, 4th, 5th, 6th, 7th, 8th, 9th, 10th, 11th, 12th, 13th, 14th, 15th, 16th, 17th, 18th
- List of Massachusetts General Courts
- List of former districts of the Massachusetts House of Representatives

== Images ==
Portraits of legislators

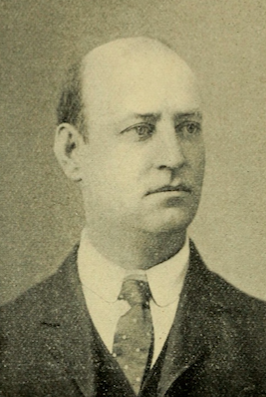
Florence Driscoll

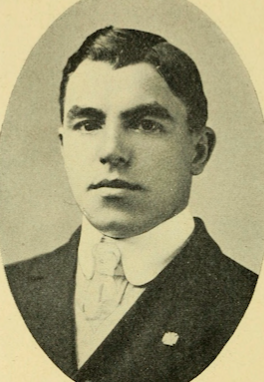
Samuel Madden

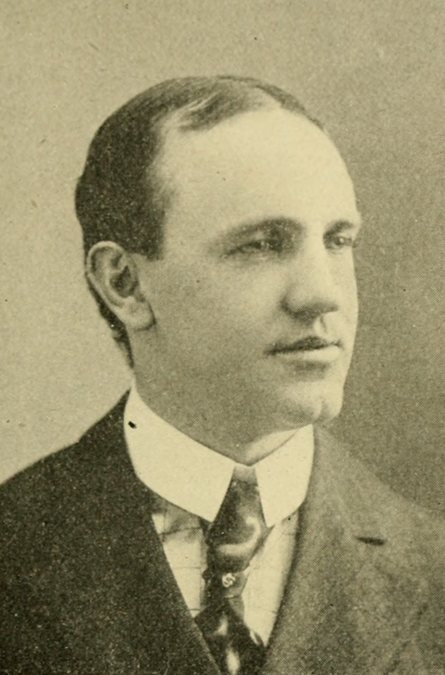
Thomas Fay

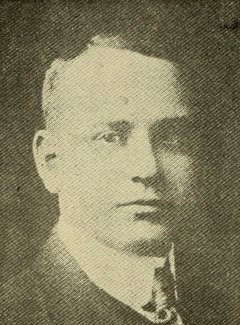
Jacob Wasserman

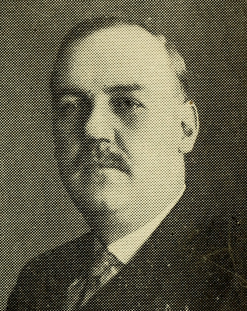
Thomas Leavitt

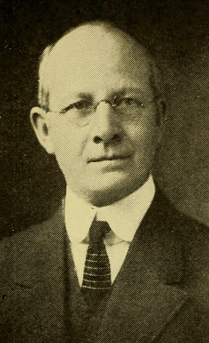
Harrison Atwood

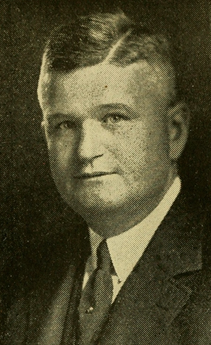
Richard McClennan Walsh

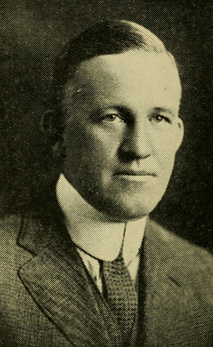
William Arthur Fish

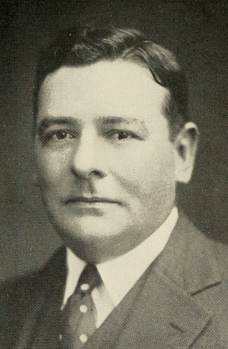
John White

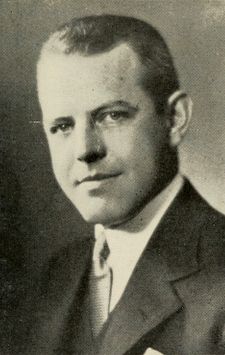
Lawrence McHugh

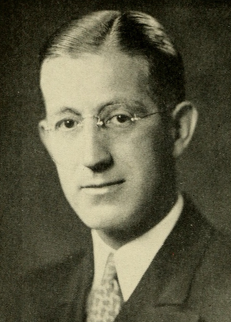
James Sullivan

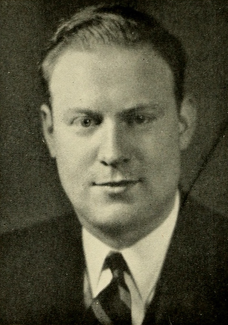
Robert Connolly

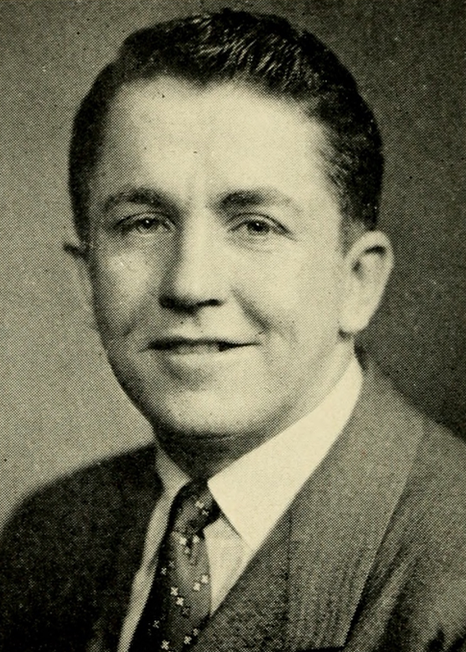
Charles Robert Doyle

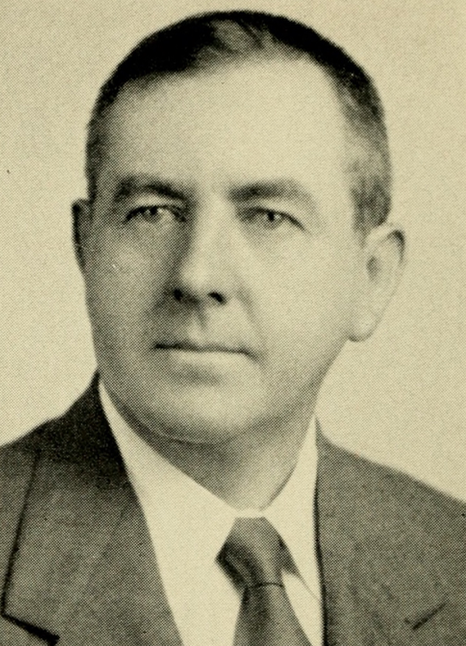
Edmond Donlan

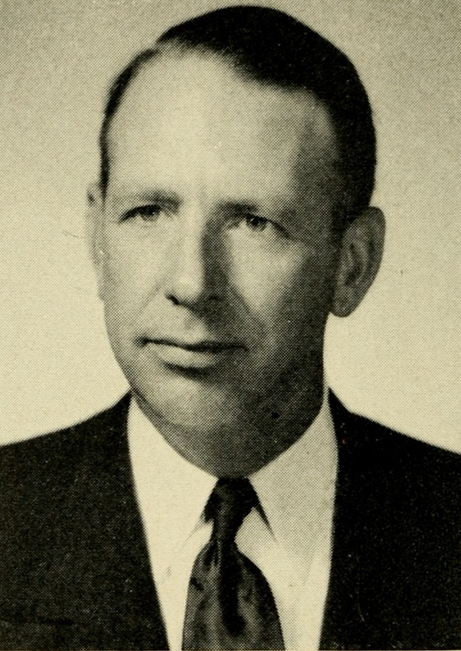
Joseph Michael O'Loughlin

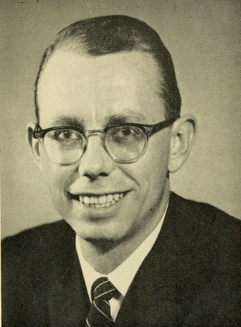
John Donovan

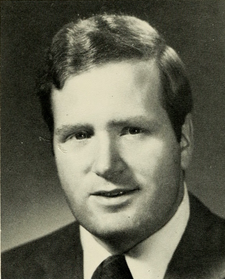
W. Paul White

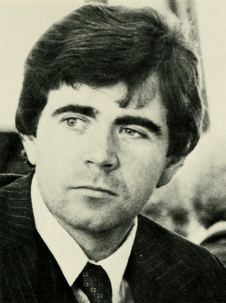
William Galvin

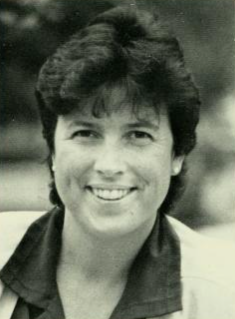
Susan Tracy

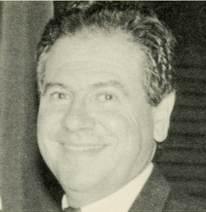
Robert DeLeo

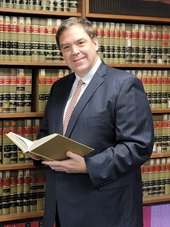
Jeffrey Turco
