= John E. Murphy (judge) =

American politician (born 1900)

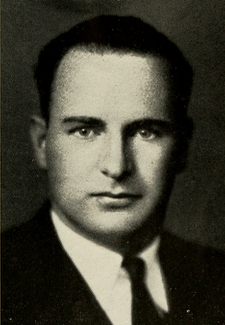
- official portrait, circa 1935

Presiding Justice of the Peabody District Court
- In office 1964–1972

Special Justice of the Peabody District Court
- In office 1958–1964
- Appointed by: Foster Furcolo

Member of the Massachusetts House of Representatives
- In office 1951–1958
- Preceded by: Louis F. O'Keefe
- Succeeded by: Thaddeus M. Buczko
- Constituency: 10th Essex district
- In office 1935–1939
- Preceded by: John A. Jones
- Succeeded by: Joseph F. Luz
- Constituency: 8th Essex district

Personal details
- Born: February 13, 1900 Portsmouth, New Hampshire, U.S.
- Died: November 1, 1994 (aged 94) Danvers, Massachusetts, U.S.
- Resting place: St. Mary's Cemetery; Danvers, Massachusetts, U.S.
- Party: Democratic
- Relations: John E. Murphy Jr. (son)
- Education: Bentley School of Accounting and Finance; Suffolk University Law School
- Occupation: Judge; Lawyer; Accountant

John E. Murphy (February 13, 1900 – November 1, 1994) was an American jurist and politician who served as presiding justice of Peabody District Court and served two stints in the Massachusetts House of Representatives.

== Early life ==
Murphy was born on February 13, 1900, in Portsmouth, New Hampshire. He served in the United States Army during both World Wars. He graduated from Bentley School of Accounting and Finance in 1922 and Suffolk University Law School and 1926.

== Politics ==
Murphy represented the 8th Essex district in the Massachusetts House of Representatives from 1935 to 1939. He ran for mayor of Peabody in 1938, but lost to Joseph B. O'Keefe by 709 votes. He challenged O'Keefe in 1940, but lost by a single vote. A recount later expanded O'Keefe's margin of victory to eight votes. Murphy returned to the House in 1951.

== Judicial service ==
In 1958, Governor Foster Furcolo appointed Murphy a special justice of the Peabody District Court. He was appointed presiding justice in 1964 and remained on the bench until his retirement in 1972.

== Personal life and death ==
Murphy married Marie L. Mulcahy, who adopted his surname.

Murphy died on November 1, 1994, at a rehabilitation center in Danvers, Massachusetts. He was survived by three children, one of whom John E. Murphy Jr., also served in the House of Representatives.
