= Robert A. Bakeman =

American clergyman and socialist activist (1879-1950)

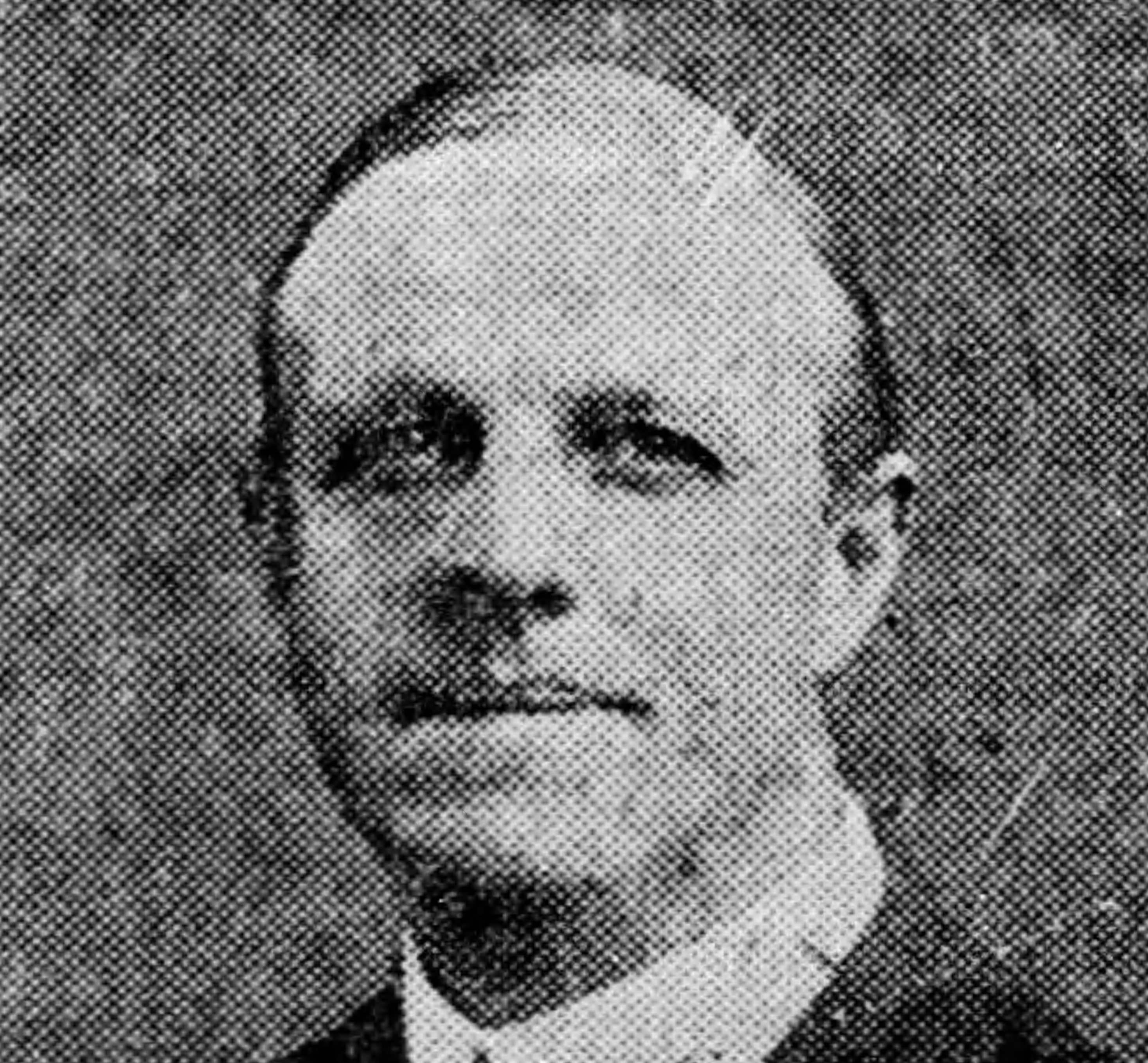
- Bakeman c. 1926

Mayor of Peabody, Massachusetts
- In office 1925–1929
- Preceded by: William A. Shea
- Succeeded by: J. Leo Sullivan

Personal details
- Born: August 16, 1879 Auburn, Maine, U.S.
- Died: September 29, 1950 (aged 71) Peabody, Massachusetts, U.S.
- Party: Socialist
- Education: Colby College; Newton Theological Institution; Harvard University
- Occupation: Minister, teacher

Robert Atherton Bakeman (August 16, 1879 – September 29, 1950) was an American clergyman and socialist activist who served as mayor of Peabody, Massachusetts.

== Early life ==
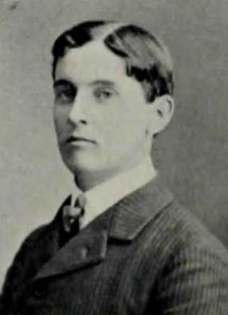
Bakeman in the Colby College yearbook, 1900

Bakeman was born in Auburn, Maine and raised in Chelsea, Massachusetts, where his father, Francis W. Bakeman, was the pastor of the First Baptist Church for several years. Bakeman graduated from Colby College in 1901. After graduating he enrolled in the Newton Theological Institution and preached at churches in Maine during the summer. In November 1905, he married June Dunn of Houlton, Maine. They had two children.

== East Jaffrey ==
Bakeman graduated from the Newton Theological Institution in 1905. On October 9, 1905, he was ordained to the ministry at his father's church. On October 28, 1905, he accepted a call from the Baptist church in East Jaffrey, New Hampshire and became its pastor on November 5, 1905. In 1906, he was elected to the Jaffrey school board. One of his first acts was to remove 11 children who were illegally working in cotton mill. He gained notoriety at the 1909 New England Baptist Conference for asserting that the Baptist church could not reach the workingman until it refused to accept gifts from John D. Rockefeller and others who profited from the slavery of the common people. At the following year's conference he attempted to introduce a resolution declaring the Baptist denomination to be against such gifts but the presiding officer refused to receive it. In 1910, Bakeman joined the Socialist Party of America and was offered the part's nomination for the United States House of Representatives seat in New Hampshire's 2nd congressional district, but declined on the ground that he had not been a member of the party long enough. His socialist beliefs caused his more conservative parishioners to leave the church and Bakeman worked as a weaver in a Fitchburg, Massachusetts mill on weekdays to help make ends meet.

== Schenectady ==
In 1912, Bakeman became an associate pastor under George R. Lunn at the United People's Church of Schenectady, New York. He left the church later that year for a job with the city's department of cleaning. He declared in his farewell address that there was no need for professional ministers and that it was "time ministers get off the people's back's and went to work". In 1912, Bakeman was arrested five times for his involvement in a strike in Little Falls, New York. Bakeman was found guilty of violating a city ordinance with prohibited blocking a city street. He was fined $50 and sentenced to 50 days in jail.

== Teaching ==
In 1914, Bakeman enrolled at Harvard University and earned his Master of Arts degree the following year. He taught in the Springfield, Massachusetts public schools, however he was asked to resign after his arrest in Little Falls became known. The following year he was principal of a grammar school in Adams, Massachusetts. He was dismissed when his past was revealed. He read gas meters and sold fire insurance until 1917, when he left Adams for a teaching position in Hinckley, Maine. In February 1918, Bakeman joined the YMCA and worked for the organization in France during World War I.

== Peabody ==
After the war, Bakeman settled in Peabody, Massachusetts, where he became pastor of the Second Congregational Church and taught an Americanization class in the public schools. In 1920, he opposed a proposed city ordinance that would have required a permit for public speaking in the city streets. Mayor S. Howard Donnell, who proposed the ordinance, accused Bakeman of wanting a Soviet government in Peabody, a charge that Bakeman denied. After the ordinance was defeated, Donnell stated that he would not approve any pay vouchers for Bakeman. One month later, Bakeman was elected to the city's school committee over a pro-Donnell candidate. In 1921 he helped settle a leather workers' strike. In 1922 he left the Second Congregational Church in order to run for mayor of Peabody. He lost by 126 votes to incumbent William A. Shea.

Bakeman ran again in 1924 and was elected. In 1926 he was reelected over David A. Barry by 194 votes. After socialist leader Alfred Baker Lewis was arrested at a rally for Sacco and Vanzetti in Peabody, Bakeman dismissed the city's acting police chief, arranged for the charges to be dismissed, and led a second rally three days later that was attended by 10,000 people. Bakeman lost his 1928 reelection bid to city councilor J. Leo Sullivan 59% to 41%. The Boston Globe blamed his defeat on his decision to permit the Sacco and Vanzetti rally.

In 1930, Bakeman became a counselor at the Norfolk Prison Colony. On February 10, 1931, he was one of twelve people arrested when the Boston Police Department broke up an unpermitted meeting of the Trade Union Unity League at the Parkman Bandstand. He was found not guilty.

Bakeman was runner-up in the 1934 mayoral election. He received 25% of the vote to James E. McVann's 55% (Charles V. Cassidy received the remaining 20%).

Bakeman died on September 29, 1950, in Peabody.
