= Susan Tracy =

American politician from Massachusetts (born 1960)

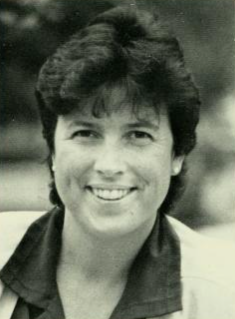

Member of the Massachusetts House of Representatives from the 19th Suffolk District
- In office 1991–1995
- Preceded by: William F. Galvin
- Succeeded by: Robert DeLeo

Personal details
- Born: August 24, 1960 (age 66) Boston, Massachusetts
- Party: Democratic
- Education: Boston College; John F. Kennedy School of Government
- Occupation: Political Consultant; Politician

Susan M. Tracy (born August 24, 1960, in Boston, Massachusetts) is an American political consultant and politician who represented the 19th Suffolk District in the Massachusetts House of Representatives from 1991 to 1995. She was a candidate in the 1998 Massachusetts 8th congressional district race. She finished eight out of ten candidates in the Democratic primary.
