= Philip C. O'Donnell =

American politician

Philip O'Donnell
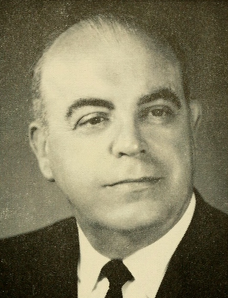
- official portrait, circa 1967

Member of the Massachusetts House of Representatives for the 5th Essex District
- In office 1967–1971
- Preceded by: John T. Berry
- Succeeded by: John E. Murphy Jr.

Mayor of Peabody, Massachusetts
- In office 1952–1962
- Preceded by: Leo F. McGrath
- Succeeded by: Edward T. Meaney

Member of the Peabody City Council
- In office 1947–1951

Personal details
- Born: July 29, 1915 Peabody, Massachusetts
- Died: November 23, 1986 (aged 71) Salem, Massachusetts
- Party: Democratic
- Education: Suffolk Law School
- Occupation: Leather worker Airport employee Mayor; Shopping center director State representative

Philip Conroy O'Donnell (July 29, 1915 – November 23, 1986) was an American politician who served as mayor of Peabody, Massachusetts from 1952 to 1962 and was a member of the Massachusetts House of Representatives from 1967 to 1971.

== Early life ==
O'Donnell was born on July 29, 1915, in Peabody. He graduated from Peabody High School and was a leather worker until he entered the United States Army during World War II. He was a technical sergeant in the Army Air Corps and served in Europe for 28 months. After the war he graduated Suffolk Law School and worked for the state airport management board.

== Politics ==
O'Donnell was a member of the Peabody city council from 1947 to 1951. In 1951 he defeated incumbent Leo F. McGrath to become mayor of Peabody. During his decade as mayor, O'Donnell presided over a building boom that saw development of West Peabody and the North Shore Shopping Center, the construction of Leo Buckley Stadium, three new schools, three housing projects, two new fire stations, municipal parking lots, and little league fields, a $1 million addition to J. B. Thomas Hospital, and water rehabilitation, street paving, and sidewalk projects. He was not a candidate for reelection in 1961, but allowed his supporters to run a write-in campaign for him that saw him finish fourth out of eight candidates.

O'Donnell was chairman of the Massachusetts Alcoholic Beverage Commission from 1959 to 1962. In 1962 he was an unsuccessful candidate for the Democratic nomination for the Massachusetts's 6th congressional district in the United States House of Representatives. From 1967 to 1971 he represented the 5th Essex District in the Massachusetts House of Representatives. He later served as clerk of the House Rules Committee.

== Personal life ==
Outside of politics, O'Donnell was the director of the Lowe Mart Shopping Center in West Peabody. He was the father of two children. In 1982 his son was convicted of attempting to bribe a Danvers, Massachusetts selectman. O'Donnell died on November 23, 1986, after a short illness.
