= Henry W. Hallinan =

American politician

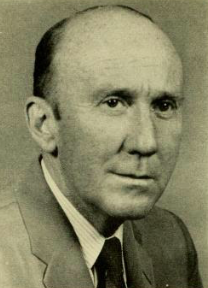
- Hallinan, circa 1959

Member of the Massachusetts House of Representatives for the 10th Essex district
- In office 1957–1960
- Preceded by: Philip J. Durkin
- Succeeded by: John T. Berry

Member of the Peabody City Council
- In office 1947–1951

Personal details
- Born: February 1, 1915 Peabody, Massachusetts, U.S.
- Died: August 29, 1960 (aged 45) Peabody, Massachusetts, U.S.
- Resting place: St. Mary's Cemetery; Salem, Massachusetts, U.S.
- Party: Democratic
- Education: University of Vermont
- Occupation: Civil engineer

Henry Walter Hallinan (February 1, 1915 – August 29, 1960) was an American politician who was a member of the Massachusetts House of Representatives from 1957 to 1960.

== Early life ==
Hallinan was born on February 1, 1915, in Peabody, Massachusetts. He graduated from Peabody High School and the University of Vermont. He served in the United States Army during World War II and was a civil engineer for the Massachusetts Department of Public Works.

== Politics ==
Hallinan was a member of the Peabody city council from 1947 to 1951 and was the council president in 1951. In 1955 he was an unsuccessful candidate for mayor. He won a 1957 special election for the Massachusetts House of Representatives seat in the 10th Essex district. He remained in the House until his death on August 29, 1960.
