= Philip J. Durkin =

American politician (1903–1992)

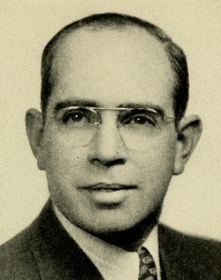

Presiding Justice of the Salem District Court
- In office 1964–1973
- Preceded by: Joseph B. Harrington
- Succeeded by: Samuel Zoll

Member of the Massachusetts House of Representatives from the 10th Essex district
- In office 1949–1957
- Preceded by: Arthur B. Carney Jr.
- Succeeded by: Henry W. Hallinan

Personal details
- Born: October 21, 1903 Salem, Massachusetts
- Died: January 15, 1992 (aged 88) Largo, Florida
- Party: Democratic
- Education: Boston University School of Business Administration; Suffolk Law School
- Occupation: Lawyer; State legislator Judge

Philip J. Durkin (October 21, 1903 – January 15, 1992) was an American jurist and politician who served as a judge of the Salem District Court from 1957 to 1973 and a member of the Massachusetts House of Representatives from 1949 to 1957.

== Early life ==
Durkin was born on October 21, 1903, in Salem, Massachusetts. He graduated from Salem High School in 1923, the Boston University School of Business Administration in 1927, and Suffolk Law School in 1930.

== Political career ==
From 1933 to 1949, Durkin was a member of the Salem City Council. From 1940 to 1941 he was the council president. In 1948 he was elected to the Massachusetts House of Representatives.

== Judicial career ==
In August 1957, Durkin, who had been a supporter of Governor Foster Furcolo's failed 3% sales tax, was appointed an associate justice of the Salem District Court by Furcolo. In 1964 he was elevated to presiding justice by Governor Endicott Peabody. In 1972, Massachusetts voters passed a Constitutional Amendment requiring the retirement of judges at age 70, which forced Durkin into retirement the following year.

== Later life ==
Durkin spent his later years in Beverly, Massachusetts, and Largo, Florida. He died on January 15, 1992, at his winter home in Largo.
