= 2022 Massachusetts Secretary of the Commonwealth election =

State election

- November 8, 2022
- Turnout: 51.4%
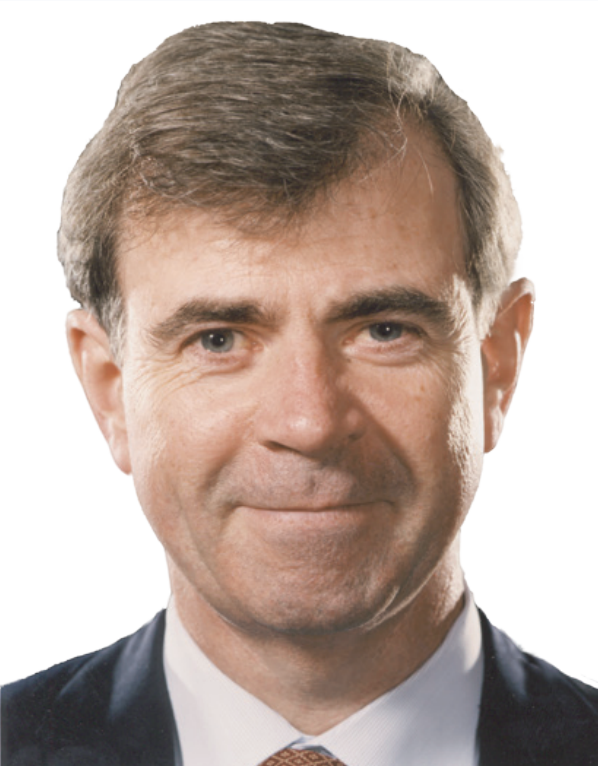

Nominee	William Galvin	Rayla Campbell
Party	Democratic	Republican
Popular vote	1,665,808	722,021
Percentage	67.69%	29.34%
- Galvin: 40–50% 50–60% 60–70% 70–80% 80–90% >90% Campbell: 40–50% 50–60% 40–50% 50–60% 60–70% 70–80% Tie: 40–50% 50% No votes
Secretary of the Commonwealth before election
William Galvin
Democratic
Elected Secretary of the Commonwealth
William Galvin
Democratic

The 2022 Massachusetts Secretary of the Commonwealth election was held on November 8, 2022, to elect the Massachusetts Secretary of the Commonwealth. Incumbent Democrat William Galvin won re-election to an eighth term. Primary elections were held on September 6, with Galvin defeating Tanisha Sullivan, president of NAACP Boston, to win the Democratic nomination. Galvin has been Secretary since January 1, 1995. The last Republican to be elected to the position was Frederic Cook, in 1949. Galvin is the longest tenured secretary in the history of the Commonwealth, surpassing Cook.

== Democratic primary ==
=== Candidates ===
==== Nominee ====
- William Galvin, incumbent secretary of the commonwealth

==== Eliminated in primary ====
- Tanisha Sullivan, corporate attorney and president of NAACP Boston

=== Endorsements ===
William Galvin

Labor unions

- Massachusetts AFL–CIO
- Massachusetts Teachers Association

Newspapers

- The Boston Globe
Tanisha Sullivan

U.S. representatives

- Joe Kennedy III, former MA-04 (2013–2021)
- Seth Moulton, MA-06 (2015–present)
- Ayanna Pressley, MA-07 (2019–present)

State legislators

- Julian Cyr, state senator from the Cape and Islands district (2017–present)

Local officials

- Katjana Ballantyne, mayor of Somerville
- Nicole LaChapelle, mayor of Easthampton
- Sumbul Siddiqui, mayor of Cambridge
- Greg Verga, mayor of Gloucester

Individuals

- Barbara F. Lee, philanthropist

Labor unions

- International Brotherhood of Electrical Workers Local 103
- Service Employees International Union Local 509 & 1199SEIU
- United Auto Workers

Organizations

- EMILY's List
- Our Revolution Massachusetts

Political parties

- Massachusetts Democratic Party

=== Debates ===
2022 Massachusetts Secretary of the Commonwealth democratic primary debate
No.	Date	Host	Moderator	Link	Democratic	Democratic
Key: P Participant A Absent N Not invited I Invited W Withdrawn						
Key: P Participant A Absent N Not invited I Invited W Withdrawn					William Galvin	Tanisha Sullivan
1	Aug. 8, 2022	WBUR-FM	Tiziana Dearing	YouTube	P	P
2	Aug. 10, 2022	WGBH-TV	Jim Braude	YouTube	P	P

=== Polling ===
Poll source	Date(s) administered	Sample size (Note: Key: A – all adults RV – registered voters LV – likely voters V – unclear)	Margin of error	William Galvin	Tanisha Sullivan	Other	Undecided
UMass Amherst	August 26–29, 2022	500 (LV)	± 5.1%	49%	30%	1%	20%
UMass Lowell	August 16–25, 2022	800 (LV)	± 3.9%	56%	21%	1%	22%
Advantage, Inc. (R) (Note: Poll sponsored by the Massachusetts Fiscal Alliance, a Republican-aligned group)	August 22–23, 2022	563 (LV)	± 4.1%	55%	14%	–	31%
MassINC Polling Group (D) (Note: Poll sponsored by Priorities for Progress, a Democratic-aligned group)	August 19–21, 2022	401 (LV)	± 4.9%	53%	20%	1%	23%
MassINC Polling Group	August 5–9, 2022	520 (LV)	± 5.1%	43%	15%	3%	38%
DAPA Research (D) (Note: Poll sponsored by the National Association of Government Employees, which supports Galvin)	Mid-July 2022	300 (LV)	± 5.7%	49%	23%	–	28%
UMass Amherst	June 15–21, 2022	557 (LV)	± 4.7%	38%	25%	0%	37%
MassINC Polling Group (D)	June 2022	– (LV)	–	52%	15%	3%	29%

=== Results ===
==== Convention ====
Democratic convention vote, June 4
Party	Candidate	Votes	%
Democratic	Tanisha Sullivan	2,578	62.4
Democratic	William Galvin (incumbent)	1,553	37.5
Total votes		4,131	100.0%

==== Primary ====
Democratic primary results
Party	Candidate	Votes	%
Democratic	William Galvin (incumbent)	524,947	70.15%
Democratic	Tanisha Sullivan	223,420	29.85%
Total votes		748,367	100.0%

== Republican primary ==
=== Candidates ===
==== Nominee ====
- Rayla Campbell, former dental assistant and insurance claims manager and write-in candidate for Massachusetts's 7th congressional district in 2020

=== Results ===
Republican primary results
Party	Candidate	Votes	%
Republican	Rayla Campbell	207,927	100.0%
Total votes		207,927	100.0%

== General election ==
=== Post-primary endorsements ===
William Galvin (D)

Newspapers

- Boston Herald
Rayla Campbell (R)

Organizations

- Maggie's List

=== Predictions ===
Source	Ranking	As of
Sabato's Crystal Ball	Safe D	December 1, 2021
Elections Daily	Safe D	November 7, 2022

=== Polling ===
Poll source	Date(s) administered	Sample size	Margin of error	Bill Galvin (D)	Rayla Campbell (R)	Juan Sanchez (G-R)	Other	Undecided
UMass Amherst/YouGov	October 20–26, 2022	700 (RV)	± 4.3%	58%	30%	4%	2% (Note: "Other" with 2%)	6%
UMass Lowell/YouGov	October 18–25, 2022	1,000 (LV)	± 4.1%	58%	24%	3%	–	15%
Suffolk University	October 13–16, 2022	500 (LV)	± 4.4%	52%	25%	7%	1% (Note: "Refused" with 1%)	14%
Suffolk University	September 10–13, 2022	500 (RV)	± 4.4%	53%	19%	6%	1%	22%

=== Results ===
2022 Massachusetts Secretary of the Commonwealth election
Party	Candidate	Votes	%	±%
Democratic	William Galvin (incumbent)	1,665,808	67.69%	−3.13%
Republican	Rayla Campbell	722,021	29.34%	+4.01%
Green-Rainbow	Juan Sanchez	71,717	2.91%	−0.88%
Write-in		1,396	0.06%	-0.01%
Total votes		2,460,942	100.0%	
Democratic hold				

==== By county ====
By county

County	William F. Galvin Democratic		Rayla Campbell Republican		All Others	
County	#	%	#	%	#	%
Barnstable	75,796	64.68%	39,302	33.54%	2,081	1.77%
Berkshire	35,432	72.78%	11,435	23.49%	1,818	3.73%
Bristol	106,575	58.73%	70,681	38.95%	4,222	2.33%
Dukes	7,262	78.37%	1,727	18.64%	277	2.99%
Essex	188,233	66.3%	88,390	31.13%	7,288	2.57%
Franklin	22,146	70.52%	7,506	23.9%	1,750	5.57%
Hampden	80,214	58.51%	50,993	37.2%	5,882	4.29%
Hampshire	46,156	71.73%	14,300	22.22%	3,887	6.04%
Middlesex	440,230	73.37%	141,095	23.52%	18,650	3.11%
Nantucket	3,422	70.43%	1,324	27.25%	113	2.33%
Norfolk	197,864	70.16%	77,740	27.56%	6,424	2.28%
Plymouth	128,988	60.52%	80,552	37.79%	3,594	1.69%
Suffolk	156,881	79.66%	30,555	15.52%	9,499	4.83%
Worcester	176,609	60.76%	106,421	36.61%	7,628	2.62%
Totals	1,665,808	67.69%	722,021	29.34%	72,543	2.97%

==== By congressional district ====
Galvin won all nine congressional districts.

District	Galvin	Campbell	Representative
1st	61%	35%	Richard Neal
2nd	66%	30%	Jim McGovern
3rd	65%	32%	Lori Trahan
4th	66%	32%	Jake Auchincloss
5th	76%	21%	Katherine Clark
6th	66%	32%	Seth Moulton
7th	83%	12%	Ayanna Pressley
8th	70%	28%	Stephen Lynch
9th	62%	36%	Bill Keating

== Notes ==
Partisan clients
