= Peabody Municipal Light Plant =

Electric utility company

Peabody Municipal Light Plant (PMLP) is an American municipal electric utility company serving the citizens of Peabody, Massachusetts and some surrounding communities. The five-member Municipal Lighting Commission is responsible for the operations of PMLP, and its members are elected by the citizens of Peabody. PMLP was founded in 1891 following a protracted legal battle with surrounding jurisdictions.

The company was governed by an elected Municipal Board from 1902 to 1916. When Peabody became a city in 1916, the company was placed under the control of the Mayor, who appointed a Light Board to act in an advisory capacity. This form of governance was in place until November 6, 1951, when voters accepted a Massachusetts Statute which reinstated an elected Municipal Lighting Commission to independently oversee the operation of PMLP.

== See also ==
- Electricity distribution companies by country
- List of United States electric companies
- Peabody, Massachusetts
