= List of members of the Boston City Council =

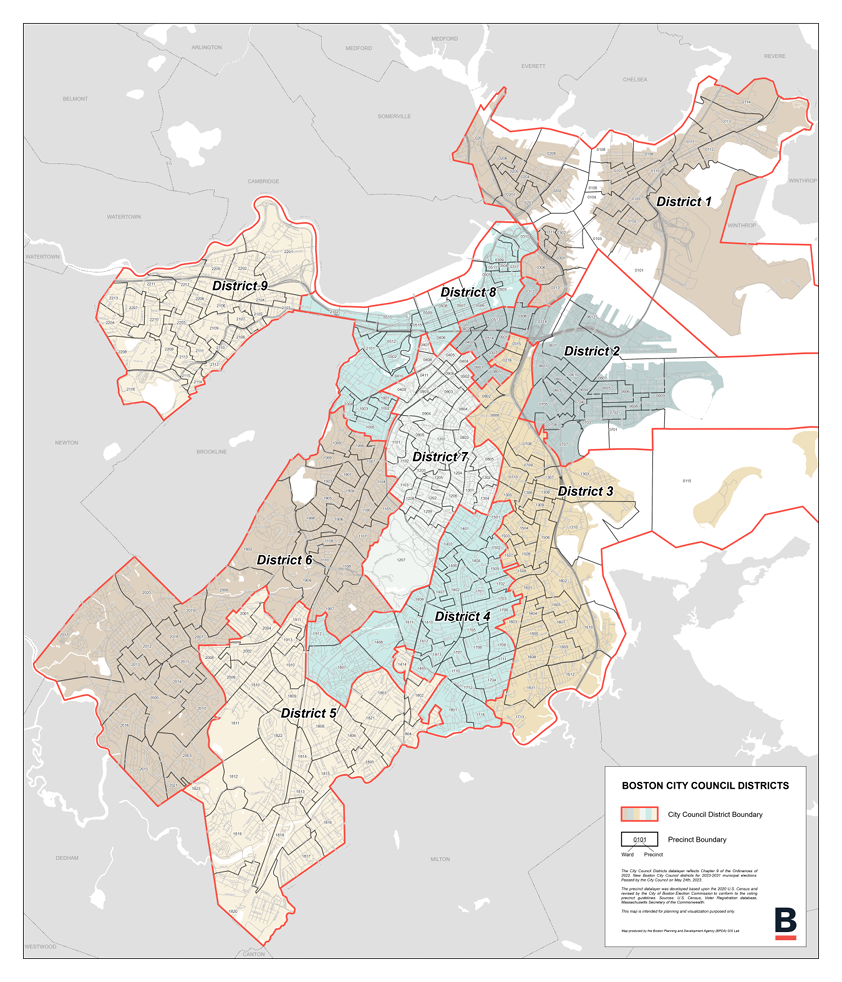
Map of City Council districts, Boston, Massachusetts (2023)

This is a list of members of the Boston City Council, both past and present, serving the people of Boston, Massachusetts, United States.

== Council member selection ==
Since 1984, the council has consisted of 13 members: four members elected at-large and nine members elected by district. All 13 seats are contested every two years. The preliminary election and general election are held in September and November, respectively, of odd years, with winners starting their terms in January of even years. For example, a preliminary election was held in September 2017 for the November 2017 general election, with elected council members starting their terms in January 2018.

Historically, the makeup of the council has changed multiple times. Since 1910:

Years	Total size	Seats	
Years	Total size	At-large	Ward or district
1910–1925	9	9	0
1926–1951	22	0	22
1952–1983	9	9	0
1984–present	13	4	9

== By term ==
=== 1822–29 ===
Beginning May 1, 1822

- Aldermen: Samuel Billings, Ephraim Eliot, Jacob Hall, Joseph Head, Joseph Jenkins, Joseph Lovering, Nathaniel Pope Russell, Bryant Parrott Tilden
- Common Council:
  - Ward 1: William Barry, Thaddeus Page, Charles Wells, Simon Wilkinson
  - Ward 2: Martin Bates, Benjamin Lamson, Henry Orne (Note: Resigned July 29.), Joseph Stodder
  - Ward 3: Theodore Dexter, Joshua Emmons, Samuel Jones, William Bowes Bradford (Note: Did not qualify.)
  - Ward 4: Joseph Coolidge, Samuel Perkins, Robert Gould Shaw, Joel Thayer
  - Ward 5: George Washington Coffin, Thomas Kendall, Horatio Gates Ware, Isaac Winslow (Note: From May 20.)
  - Ward 6: Samuel Appleton, Thomas Motley, Jesse Shaw, William Sullivan
  - Ward 7: Jonathan Amory, Patrick Tracy Jackson, Augustus Peabody, Enoch Silsby
  - Ward 8: Jonathan Davis, Hawkes Lincoln, William Prescott (president), John Welles
  - Ward 9: David Watts Bradlee, Peter Chardon Brooks, James Perkins, Benjamin Russell
  - Ward 10: Andrew Drake, Daniel Lewis Gibbens, David Collson Moseley, Isaac Stevens
  - Ward 11: George Watson Brimmer, Asa Bullard, Barzillai Homes, Winslow Lewis
  - Ward 12: Cyrus Alger, John French, John Howe, Moses Williams

Beginning May 1, 1823

- Aldermen: Daniel Baxter, George Odiorne, David Weld Child, Joseph Hawley Dorr, Asher Benjamin, Enoch Patterson, Caleb Eddy, Stephen Hooper
- Common Council:
  - Ward 1: Thaddeus Page, Simon Wilkinson, John Elliott, Joseph Wheeler
  - Ward 2: Martin Bates, Benjamin Lamson, Joseph Stodder, John Parker Boyd (Note: From May 5.)
  - Ward 3: Theodore Dexter, Samuel Jones, John Richardson Adan, John Damarisque Dyer
  - Ward 4: Joseph Coolidge, Samuel Perkins, Robert Gould Shaw, Henry Farnam
  - Ward 5: Thomas Kendall, Isaac Winslow, Elias Haskell, John Sullivan Perkins
  - Ward 6: Joseph Stacy Hastings, Joel Prouty, John Stevens, William Wright
  - Ward 7: Jonathan Amory, Enoch Silsby, Samuel Swett, Charles Pelham Curtis
  - Ward 8: Jonathan Davis, Hawkes Lincoln, John Welles (president), Lewis Tappan
  - Ward 9: Benjamin Russell, James Savage, Eliphalet Williams, Samuel King Williams
  - Ward 10: Aaron Baldwin, David Francis, Francis Johonnot Oliver, Thomas Beale Wales
  - Ward 11: Asa Bullard, Charles Howard, Josiah Stedman, Joseph Willet
  - Ward 12: Samuel Bradlee, Noah Brooks, Francis Jackson, Charles Sprague

Beginning May 1, 1824

- Aldermen: Daniel Baxter, George Odiorne, David Weld Child, Joseph Hawley Dorr, Asher Benjamin, (Note: Resigned December 13.) Enoch Patterson, Caleb Eddy, Stephen Hooper, (Note: Died in September.) Cyrus Alger (Note: From November 1.)
- Common Council:
  - Ward 1: William Barry, John Elliot, Joseph Wheeler, Michael Tombs
  - Ward 2: William Little Jr., Oliver Reed, Joseph Stone, Thaddeus Page
  - Ward 3: John Richardson Adan, John Damarisque Dyer, Edward Page, William Sprague (Note: From May 3.)
  - Ward 4: Joseph Coolidge, Robert Gould Shaw, Jeremiah Fitch, William R. P. Washburn
  - Ward 5: Elias Haskell, Eliphalet Porter Hartshorn, George Washington Otis, Winslow Wright
  - Ward 6: Joseph Stacy Hastings, (Note: From May 3.) Joel Prouty, William Wright, Thomas Wiley
  - Ward 7: Charles Pelham Curtis, William Goddard, Elijah Morse, Isaac Parker
  - Ward 8: Jonathan Davis, Hawkes Lincoln, John Ballard, John Chipman Gray Sr.
  - Ward 9: Benjamin Russell, Eliphalet Williams, Samuel King Williams, Benjamin Willis
  - Ward 10: Thomas Beale Wales, James Savage, Phineas Upham, Francis Johonnot Oliver (president)
  - Ward 11: Josiah Stedman, Samuel Frothingham, Giles Lodge, Charles Sprague
  - Ward 12: Samuel Bradlee, Francis Jackson, Isaac Thom, Charles Bemis

Beginning May 1, 1825

- Aldermen: Daniel Carney, John Bellows, Josiah Marshall, John Damarisque Dyer, Thomas Welsh Jr., George Blake, Henry Jackson Oliver, John Bryant
- Common Council:
  - Ward 1: William Barry, John Elliot, Robert Fennelly, Lewis Lerow
  - Ward 2: Oliver Reed, Scammel Penniman, Benjamin Clark, John Ward Fenno
  - Ward 3: John Richardson Adan, Thomas Wells, Abraham William Fuller, Amos Farnsworth
  - Ward 4: Joseph Coolidge, William R. P. Washburn, George Hallet, Theodore Dexter
  - Ward 5: John Sullivan Perkins, Ezra Dyer, Charles Tracy, William Simonds
  - Ward 6: Joseph Stacy Hastings, Thomas Wiley, (Note: From May 6.) Isaac Waters, Samuel Thaxter
  - Ward 7: Charles Pelham Curtis, William Goddard, Elijah Morse, Isaac Parker
  - Ward 8: John Chipman Gray Sr., Franklin Dexter, Jeremiah Smith Boies, Levi Meriam
  - Ward 9: Eliphalet Williams, Benjamin Willis, (Note: From May 6.) Jeffrey Richardson, Josiah Bradlee (Note: From May 6.)
  - Ward 10: Francis Johonnot Oliver (president), James Savage, Jonathan Simonds, John Parker Rice
  - Ward 11: Samuel Frothingham, Giles Lodge, George Morey Jr., Joshua Vose
  - Ward 12: John Stevens, Adam Bent, Oliver Fisher, Ephraim Groves Ware

Beginning January 2, 1826

- Aldermen: Daniel Carney, John Bellows, Josiah Marshall, Thomas Welsh Jr., Henry Jackson Oliver, John Foster Loring, Francis Jackson, Edward Hutchinson Robbins
- Common Council:
  - Ward 1: William Barry, Lewis Lerow, Lemuel Putnam Grosvenor, Samuel Aspinwall
  - Ward 2: Scammel Penniman, Benjamin Clark, John Ward Fenno, Nathaniel Faxon
  - Ward 3: John Richardson Adan (president), William Sprague, Amos Farnsworth, Asa Adams
  - Ward 4: George Hallet, William Howe, John Warren James, Joseph Eveleth
  - Ward 5: Ezra Dyer, Charles Tracy, Jonathan Thaxter, William Parker
  - Ward 6: Joseph Stacy Hastings, Thomas Wiley, Isaac Waters, Samuel Thaxter
  - Ward 7: Augustus Peabody, Charles Pelham Curtis, Isaac Parker, Edward Brooks
  - Ward 8: John Chipman Gray Sr., Jeremiah Smith Boies, Levi Meriam, Charles Torrey
  - Ward 9: Francis Bassett, Joseph Helger Thayer, Joseph Hawley Dorr, John Baker
  - Ward 10: Aaron Baldwin, John Parker Rice, Solomon Piper, Charles Barnard
  - Ward 11: Giles Lodge, George Morey Jr., Joshua Vose, Thomas Brewer
  - Ward 12: John Stevens, Adam Bent, Oliver Fisher, Henry Hatch

Beginning January 1, 1827

- Aldermen: Cyrus Alger, John Bellows, Thomas Welsh Jr., John Foster Loring, Jeremiah Smith Boies, Robert Fennelly, Thomas Beale Wales, James Savage
- Common Council:
  - Ward 1: William Barry, Simon Wilkinson, John Elliot, (Note: From January 8.) Samuel Aspinwall
  - Ward 2: Benjamin Clark, Scammel Penniman, John Warren James, John Floyd Truman
  - Ward 3: John Richardson Adan, John Damarisque Dyer, Asa Adams, Thomas Gould
  - Ward 4: Quincy Tufts, George Hallet, William Howe, Joseph Eveleth
  - Ward 5: Jonathan Thaxter, William Parker, Lewis Glover Pray, George Lane (Note: From February 19.)
  - Ward 6: Isaac Waters, Samuel Thaxter, Jonathan Loring, Joseph Warren Lewis
  - Ward 7: Samuel Dorr, Samuel Dexter Ward, John Arno Bacon, Thomas Walley Phillips
  - Ward 8: John Chipman Gray Sr., Levi Meriam, Gamaliel Bradford, John Prescott Bigelow
  - Ward 9: David Watts Bradlee, Benjamin Russell, Eliphalet Williams, Joshua Sears
  - Ward 10: Jonathan Simonds, George Brinley, William Parker, Charles Sprague
  - Ward 11: Giles Lodge, George Morey Jr., Joshua Vose, Josiah Vose
  - Ward 12: Adam Bent, William Wright, William Little Jr., (Note: From January 8.) George Gay

Beginning January 7, 1828

- Aldermen: John Foster Loring, Robert Fennelly, (Note: Died in September.) James Savage, Thomas Kendall, James Hall, Phineas Upham, John Pickering, Samuel Turell Armstrong
- Common Council:
  - Ward 1: Samuel Aspinwall, Ninian Clark Betton, Horace Fox, (Note: From January 14 to December 29.) Eleazer Pratt
  - Ward 2: John Warren James, Frederick Gould, Henry Fowle Jr., George Washington Johnson
  - Ward 3: John Richardson Adan (president), Thomas Gould, Levi Roberts Lincoln, John Damarisque Dyer, (Note: Resigned April 29.) James Lendall Pitts Orrok (Note: From May 12.)
  - Ward 4: Joseph Eveleth, Quincy Tufts, Andrew Cunningham Jr., James Means
  - Ward 5: George Washington Otis, William Parker, Lewis Glover Pray, George Lane (Note: From February 19.)
  - Ward 6: Isaac Waters, Francis Johonnot Oliver, Ebenezer Appleton, David Moody
  - Ward 7: John Arno Bacon, John Belknap, Waldo Flint, (Note: Resigned February 11.) George Washington Adams, (Note: From May 12.) Thomas Wren Ward, (Note: Resigned July 14.) Benjamin Toppan Pickman (Note: From August 6.)
  - Ward 8: John Chipman Gray Sr., John Prescott Bigelow, Norman Seaver, (Note: From January 14.) Daniel Lewis Gibbens
  - Ward 9: Benjamin Russell, Eliphalet Williams, Samuel King Williams, Thomas Lamb
  - Ward 10: Jonathan Simonds, William Parker, George Bethune, (Note: Resigned April 28.) Robert Treat Paine, (Note: From May 12.) John Lowell Jr.
  - Ward 11: Otis Everett, Otis Turner, Perez Gill, Payson Perrin
  - Ward 12: Alpheus Cary, Walter Cornell, Joseph Neale Howe, Benjamin Stevens

Beginning January 5, 1829

- Aldermen: Henry Jackson Oliver, John Foster Loring, Thomas Kendall, James Hall, Samuel Turell Armstrong, Benjamin Russell, Winslow Lewis, Charles Wells
- Common Council:
  - Ward 1: Ninian Clark Betton, Eleazer Pratt, John Wells, Christopher Gore
  - Ward 2: John Warren James, Henry Sewall Kent, Samuel Ellis, Thomas Reed, (Note: Died in February.) Daniel Ballard (Note: From March 2.)
  - Ward 3: Thomas Gould, Levi Roberts Lincoln, Joseph Bradley, Amos Bradley Parker
  - Ward 4: Quincy Tufts, Andrew Cunningham Jr., Josh Rayner, Samuel Davenport Torrey
  - Ward 5: Jonathan Thaxter, William Parker, George Lane, Joseph Eveleth
  - Ward 6: Isaac Waters, Samuel Austin Jr., Jared Lincoln, Samuel Goodhue
  - Ward 7: Benjamin Toppan Pickman, Thomas Wetmore, Walter Frost, George Washington Adams, (Note: Died April 30.) Isaac Danforth
  - Ward 8: John Prescott Bigelow, Jacob Amee, Levi Brigham, Daniel Lewis Gibbens
  - Ward 9: Eliphalet Williams, Samuel King Williams, Thomas Minns, James Brackett Richardson
  - Ward 10: Jonathan Simonds, John Lowell Jr., Samuel Leonard Abbot, Charles Casey Starbuck
  - Ward 11: Otis Everett, Otis Turner, Perez Gill, Payson Perrin
  - Ward 12: Oliver Fisher, Walter Cornell, Aaron Willard Jr., Isaac Parker Townsend

=== 1830–1839 ===
Beginning January 4, 1830

- Aldermen: Henry Jackson Oliver, John Foster Loring, Samuel Turell Armstrong, Benjamin Russell, Winslow Lewis, Charles Wells, John Burbeck McCleary, Moses Williams
- Common Council:
  - Ward 1: Ninian Clark Betton, Eleazer Pratt, (Note: From January 11.) Christopher Gore, Simon Wiggin Robinson (Note: From January 11.)
  - Ward 2: John Warren James, Samuel Ellis, Daniel Ballard, (Note: From January 11.) John B. Wells (Note: Wells added a middle initial to his name under Massachusetts chapter 76 of the special law s of 1830, which permitted individuals running for public office to insert an "intermediate letter" to clearly distinguish themselves from another local citizen of the same name.)
  - Ward 3: Thomas Gould, Levi Roberts Lincoln, Larra Crane, Michael Lovell (Note: From January 11.)
  - Ward 4: Quincy Tufts, Josh Rayner, Samuel Davenport Torrey, Washington Parker Bragg
  - Ward 5: Winslow Wright, Joseph Eveleth, Levi Boynton Haskell, Charles Leighton
  - Ward 6: Isaac Waters, Jared Lincoln, Joshua Seaver, Benjamin Parker, (Note: Seat vacated February 22.) Samuel Austin Jr. (Note: From April 12.)
  - Ward 7: Benjamin Toppan Pickman, Thomas Wetmore, Isaac Danforth, Elias Hasket Derby
  - Ward 8: John Prescott Bigelow, Jacob Amee, Levi Brigham, Edward Goldsborough Prescott
  - Ward 9: Thomas Minns, James Brackett Richardson, Joseph Reynolds Newell, Leach Harris
  - Ward 10: John Parker Rice, John Lowell Jr., Samuel Leonard Abbot, Levi Bliss
  - Ward 11: Otis Everett, Perez Gill, Jabez Ellis, Joseph Hay
  - Ward 12: Henry Hatch, Aaron Willard Jr., Thomas Melville Vinson, James Wright

Beginning January 3, 1831

- Aldermen: Henry Jackson Oliver, Samuel Turell Armstrong, Benjamin Russell, John Burbeck McCleary, Henry Farnam, Adam Bent, John Binney, Richard Devens Harris
- Common Council:
  - Ward 1: Simon Wiggin Robinson, John Brigden Tremere, Charles French, Frederick Gould
  - Ward 2: John Warren James, Daniel Ballard, (Note: From February 10.) Ephraim Milton, Daniel Dickinson
  - Ward 3: Larra Crane, James Clark, Asa Swallow, Samuel Chessman
  - Ward 4: Joseph Eveleth, Josh Rayner, Washington Parker Gregg, Joshua Barker Flint
  - Ward 5: Winslow Wright, William Parker, Levi Boynton Haskell, Charles Leighton
  - Ward 6: Joseph Stacy Hastings, Isaac Waters, Ensign Sargent, Stephen Titcomb (Note: From January 27.)
  - Ward 7: Benjamin Toppan Pickman, Thomas Wetmore, Levi Bartlett, Abbott Lawrence
  - Ward 8: John Prescott Bigelow, Jacob Amee, Edward Goldsborough Prescott, Edward Hutchinson Robbins
  - Ward 9: Thomas Minns, James Brackett Richardson, Joseph Reynolds Newell, Leach Harris
  - Ward 10: Samuel Leonard Abbot, Levi Bliss, Ebenezer Bailey, Josiah Pierce
  - Ward 11: Otis Everett, Perez Gill, Jabez Ellis, Joseph Hay
  - Ward 12: Henry Hatch, Aaron Willard Jr., Thomas Melville Vinson, John Stevens

Beginning January 2, 1832

- Aldermen: Henry Jackson Oliver, Benjamin Russell, John Burbeck McCleary, Henry Farnam, John Binney, Jabez Ellis, Richard Devens Harris, (Note: Resigned February 6.) James Bowdoin, (Note: From January 23.) William Tileston, (Note: From February 27.) John Stevens (Note: Stevens died December 20, 1831, before his term began.)
- Common Council:
  - Ward 1: Simon Wiggin Robinson, Charles French, John Center, Bill Richardson
  - Ward 2: John Warren James, Ephraim Milton, Daniel Dickinson, John Brigden Tremere
  - Ward 3: Larra Crane, James Clark, Asa Swallow, Samuel Chessman
  - Ward 4: George Hallet, Joseph Eveleth, Josh Rayner, Joshua Barker Flint
  - Ward 5: Eliphalet Porter Hartshorn, William Parker, Levi Boynton Haskell, Charles Leighton
  - Ward 6: Joseph Stacy Hastings, Isaac Waters, Jonathan Porter, Grenville Temple Winthrop
  - Ward 7: Isaac Parker, Thomas Wetmore, Levi Bartlett, Henry Rice
  - Ward 8: John Prescott Bigelow, Jacob Amee, Edward Goldsborough Prescott, Edward Hutchinson Robbins
  - Ward 9: Thomas Minns, Richard Hildreth, James Brown, John Lewis Dimmock
  - Ward 10: Ebenezer Bailey, Josiah Pierce, Francis Brinley Jr., John Collamore Jr.
  - Ward 11: Joseph Hay, John Lillie Phillips, Gilman Prichard, Henry Willis Kinsman
  - Ward 12: Henry Hatch, Thomas Hunting, Ebenezer Hayward, Joseph Harris Jr.

Beginning January 7, 1833

- Aldermen: Henry Farnam, John Binney, Jabez Ellis, William Tilestone, Thomas Wetmore, Samuel Fales, Joseph Warren Revere, Benjamin Fiske
- Common Council:
  - Ward 1: Simon Wiggin Robinson, Bill Richardson, Enoch Howes Snelling, Thomas Hart Thompson
  - Ward 2: John Warren James, John B. Wells, Henry Andrews, George Priest Thomas
  - Ward 3: Larra Crane, James Clark, Samuel Chessman, Philip Adams
  - Ward 4: Robert Gould Shaw, Joseph Eveleth, Edward Blake, Silas Pierce Tarbell
  - Ward 5: Eliphalet Porter Hartshorn, Charles Leighton, Abel Phelps, Perez Loring
  - Ward 6: Joseph Stacy Hastings, Isaac Waters, Grenville Temple Winthrop, Luther Parks
  - Ward 7: Levi Bartlett, Henry Rice, William Tappan Eustis, Josiah Quincy Jr.
  - Ward 8: John Prescott Bigelow, Jacob Amee, Edward Goldsborough Prescott, Oliver W. B. Peabody
  - Ward 9: Eliphalet Williams, Silas Bullard, Francis Osborn Watts, Abner Bourne
  - Ward 10: Josiah Pierce, Daniel Messinger, Israel Martin, Thomas Richards Dascomb
  - Ward 11: Robert Treat Paine, John Doggett, Samuel Gilbert Jr., Ruel Baker
  - Ward 12: Thomas Hunting, Joseph Harris Jr., James Blake, Josiah Dunham

Beginning January 6, 1834

- Aldermen: Jabez Ellis, Thomas Wetmore, Samuel Fales, Charles Leighton, Josiah Dunham, Nathan Gurney, Samuel Atkins Eliot, Samuel Greele
- Common Council:
  - Ward 1: Enoch Howes Snelling, Henry D. Gray, Robert Keith, Henry Jackson Oliver
  - Ward 2: John Warren James, John Brigden Tremere, George Washington Smith, Joseph Melcher Leavitt
  - Ward 3: John Snelling, Simon Green Shipley, Joshua Sears, Samuel Chessman
  - Ward 4: Ammi Cutter, Ezra Trull, Asa Lewis, George Worthington Lewis
  - Ward 5: Michael Roulstone, Nathaniel Fellows Cunningham, Calvin Washburn, Enoch Hobart
  - Ward 6: Jesse Shaw, Joseph Stacy Hastings, Grenville Temple Winthrop, George Washington Bazin
  - Ward 7: Levi Bartlett, Henry Rice, William Tappan Eustis, Josiah Quincy Jr.
  - Ward 8: Edward Goldsborough Prescott, Oliver W. B. Peabody, Benjamin Apthorp Gould, Isaac McLellan Jr.
  - Ward 9: Eliphalet Williams, James Brackett Richardson, Henry Sargent, Edward Cruft Jr.
  - Ward 10: Daniel Messinger, Israel Martin, Thomas Richards Dascomb, William Reed
  - Ward 11: Robert Treat Paine, Ruel Baker, Elias Bond Thayer, Philip Marett
  - Ward 12: Thomas Hunting, Joseph Harris Jr., James Blake, Josiah Lee Currell Amee

Beginning January 5, 1835

- Aldermen: Thomas Wetmore, (Note: Resigned February 9.) Winslow Lewis, (Note: From March 9.) Samuel Fales, John Burbeck McCleary, Charles Leighton, Joseph Henshaw Heyward, Josiah Dunham, Nathan Gurney, Samuel Atkins Eliot, Samuel Greele
- Common Council:
  - Ward 1: Henry D. Gray, Robert Keith, Isaac Harris, Caleb Gould Loring
  - Ward 2: John Warren James, Stephen William Olney, Lewis Josselyn, Thomas Hollis
  - Ward 3: John Snelling, Simon Green Shipley, William Turner Spear, George Washington Smith
  - Ward 4: Moses Grant, George William Gordon, Henry Lincoln, Benajah Brigham
  - Ward 5: Calvin Washburn, Enoch Hobart, Abraham Water Blanchard, John Cochran Park
  - Ward 6: Jesse Shaw, Stephen Titcomb, Jonathan Chapman, Amos Wood
  - Ward 7: William Tappan Eustis, Josiah Quincy Jr., Horatio Masa Willis, James Means
  - Ward 8: Daniel Lewis Gibbens, Benjamin Apthorp Gould, Zebedee Cook Jr., James Harris
  - Ward 9: Eliphalet Williams, Edward Cruft Jr., Ebenezer Bailey, Horace Dupree
  - Ward 10: Solomon Piper, Israel Martin, Richard Sullivan Fay, Jedediah Tuttle
  - Ward 11: Ruel Baker, Elias Bond Thayer, Philip Marett, John Thompson
  - Ward 12: Thomas Hunting, Joseph Harris Jr., James Blake, Josiah Lee Currell Amee

Beginning January 4, 1836

- Aldermen: Winslow Lewis, John Burbeck McCleary, Joseph Henshaw Heyward, Josiah Dunham, Nathan Gurney, Samuel Greele, Thomas Hunting, Samuel Quincy
- Common Council:
  - Ward 1: Enoch Howes Snelling, Joseph Bassett, Gilbert Nurse, William Eaton
  - Ward 2: Lewis Josselyn, Thatcher Rich Raymond, Nathan Carruth, Thomas Moulton
  - Ward 3: John Boles, Benjamin Kimball, Jason Dyer Battles, Asa Barker Snow
  - Ward 4: Moses Grant, George William Gordon, Henry Lincoln, Benajah Brigham
  - Ward 5: Abraham Water Blanchard, John Cochran Park, George Washington Edmands, Ebenezer Ellis
  - Ward 6: Isaac Waters, Jonathan Chapman, Amos Wood, Henry Upham
  - Ward 7: William Tappan Eustis, Josiah Quincy Jr., Henry Edwards, James Thomas Hobart
  - Ward 8: Daniel Lewis Gibbens, Benjamin Apthorp Gould, James Harris, Thomas Coffin Amory
  - Ward 9: Eliphalet Williams, Horace Dupee, William Greene Eaton, Aaron Breed
  - Ward 10: Solomon Piper, Jedediah Tuttle, Elbridge Gerry Austin, Israel Martin, (Note: Resigned March 24.) Benjamin Yeaton (Note: From April 21.)
  - Ward 11: Elias Bond Thayer, Philip Marett, John Thompson, Benjamin Marshall Nevers
  - Ward 12: Alpheus Stetson, Stephen Child, George Savage, Solon Jenkins

Beginning January 2, 1837

- Aldermen: Henry Farnam, Thomas Wetmore, Nathan Gurney, Joseph Henshaw Hayward, Thomas Hunting, Samuel Quincy, John B. Wells, Thomas Richardson
- Common Council:
  - Ward 1: Isaac Harris, Erasmus Thompson, (Note: Died August 31.) Eleazer Pratt, (Note: From September 14.) Thomas Hudson, Samuel Locke Cutter
  - Ward 2: Lewis Josselyn, Thatcher Rich Raymond, Nathan Carruth, Thomas Moulton
  - Ward 3: John Boles, Jason Dyer Battles, Asa Barker Snow, William Orne Haskell
  - Ward 4: Moses Grant, George William Gordon, Joseph Thornton Adams, Lemuel Putnam Grosvenor
  - Ward 5: Ebenezer Ellis, Edmund Trowbridge Hastings, Philip Greely Jr., Francis Brown
  - Ward 6: Isaac Waters, Jonathan Chapman, Ezra Lincoln, Henry Edwards
  - Ward 7: Levi Bartlett, James Thomas Hobart, Thomas Buckminster Curtis, Simon Davis Leavens
  - Ward 8: Benjamin Apthorp Gould, James Harris, Thomas Coffin Amory, Charles Brooks
  - Ward 9: Eliphalet Williams, Horace Dupee, William Greene Eaton, Aaron Breed
  - Ward 10: Solomon Piper, Jedediah Tuttle, Elbridge Gerry Austin, Benjamin Yeaton
  - Ward 11: Philip Marett, Lemuel Shattuck, Calvin Bullard, Thomas Vose
  - Ward 12: George Savage, Solon Jenkins, Josiah Dunham Jr., John Thomas Dingley

Beginning January 1, 1838

- Aldermen: Henry Farnam, Thomas Wetmore, Nathan Gurney, Joseph Henshaw Hayward, Thomas Hunting, Thomas Richardson, Isaac Harris, Martin Brimmer
- Common Council:
  - Ward 1: Eleazer Pratt, Thomas Hudson, Benjamin Dodd, Bradley Newcomb Cumings
  - Ward 2: Daniel Ballard, Lewis Josselyn, Thatcher Rich Raymond, Thomas Moulton
  - Ward 3: Asa Barker Snow, Rowland Ellis, William Eaton, Charles Arnold
  - Ward 4: Moses Grant, George William Gordon, Lemuel Putnam Grosvenor, James Morris Whiton
  - Ward 5: Francis Brown, Nathaniel Hammond, James McAllaster, Theophilus Burr
  - Ward 6: Jonathan Chapman, Ezra Lincoln, Henry Edwards, Newell Aldrich Thompson
  - Ward 7: Isaac Parker, Henry Rice, Thomas Buckminster Curtis, Simon Davis Leavens
  - Ward 8: James Harris, Thomas Coffin Amory, Charles Brooks, John Brooks Russell
  - Ward 9: Eliphalet Williams, Benjamin Parker Richardson, John Brooks Parker, Thomas Jefferson Shelton
  - Ward 10: Elbridge Gerry Austin, Benjamin Yeaton, Jonathan Preston, Stephen Shelton
  - Ward 11: Philip Marett, Lemuel Shattuck, Calvin Bullard, Thomas Vose
  - Ward 12: Jeremy Drake, Nehemiah Pitman Mann, Samuel Wheeler, Warren White
- 1839 - Alderman: James Harris. — Common Council: Zebina Lee Raymond; William Dillaway; Richard Brackett; Freeborn Fairfield Raymond; Samuel Emmes; Jacob Stearns; Ezekiel Bates; Charles Wilkins; James Haughton; Alfred Augustus Wellington; William Vinal Kent; Ephraim Larkin Snow; Horace Williams; Ezra Child Hutchins; William Walker Parrott; Gideon French Thayer; Winslow Lewis Jr; Elisha Copeland Jr; John Stevens; Nicholas Noyes; George Page; Horatio Nelson Crane.

=== 1840–1849 ===
- 1840 - Aldermen: James Clark; Charles Wilkins; Abraham Thompson Lowe; William Turell Andrews; Charles Amory. — Common Council: Henry Leeds; William Russell Lovejoy; Peter Dunbar; Erastus Wilson Sanborn; Dexter Follett; Lucius Doolittle; George Washington Otis Jr; John Hubbard Wilkins; Elijah Williams Jr; George William Phillips; Daniel Kimball; Holmes Hinckley; Eben Jackson.
- 1841 - Alderman: Benson Leavitt. — Common Council: Henry Northey Hooper; Pelham Bonney; Freeman Stowe; Edward Parker Meriam; Enoch Train; Joseph Neale Howe Jr; John Plummer Healy; Theophilus Rogers Marvin; Moses Whitney Jr; Luther Blodgett; John Gardner Nazro; Richard Urann; Edward Shirley Erving; John Gray Roberts; Samuel Leeds; William Henry Howard; Seriah Stevens; William Burton Harding.
- 1842 - Aldermen: Larra Crane; William Parker, Joseph Tilden; James Longley; Richard Urann. — Common Council: Norton Newcomb; Cyrus Buttrick; Perkins Boynton; Aaron Adams; Joseph Cullen Ayer; Abner Williams Pollard; Enoch Hemenway Wakefield; Francis Boardman Crowninshield; William Brown Spooner; Noah Sturtevant; George Wheelwright; Henry Plimpton; Samuel Ripley Townsend; William Augustus Weeks; Josiah Moore Jones; Benjamin Burchstead; Charles Edward Cook; John Rice Bradlee; William Hayden; Jonathan Ellis; Henry Worthington Dutton; William Dall; Asaph Parmelee; Robert Cowdin; Willis Howes; John Tillson; Caleb Thurston.
- 1843 - Aldermen: Simon Wilkinson; Josiah Stedman; Jonathan Preston. — Common Council: Jacob George Lewis Libbey; Daniel Bartlett Jr; William Henry Learnard; Joshua B. Fowle; Henry Davis; James Whiting; James Harvey Dudley; George Washington Crockett; Willard Nason Fisher; James Fowle; Kimball Gibson; Peleg Whitman Chandler; John Slade Jr; George Tyler Bigelow; Andrew Townsend Hall; Clement Willis; Isaac Cary; Greenleaf Connor Sanborn; Romanus Emerson.
- 1844 - Aldermen: Simon Wiggin Robinson; Henry Bromfield Rogers. — Common Council: Job Turner; John Plummer Ober; Timothy Converse Kendall; Oliver Dyer; James Boynton; Samuel Whitney Hall; Charles Boardman; Loring Norcross; John Gardner; Otis Clapp; Benjamin Barnard Appleton; Joseph Bradlee; Samuel Topliff; George Whittemore; Samuel Harris; Charles H. Brown; William Pope; Asa Brown; Henry Wadsworth Fletcher; Isaac Jones.
- 1845 - Aldermen: William Pope; John Hathaway; Samuel Shurtleff Perkins; Simon Green Shipley; Joseph Cullen Ayer; Lyman Reed; James Sullivan Savage. — Common Council: Samuel Parkman Oliver; James Munroe; William R. Carnes; Benjamin Wood; John Turner; Artemus Ward; Cyrus Cummings; Samuel Abbott Lawrence; Sargent Smith Littlehale; Benjamin Seaver; George R. Sampson; George Stillman Hillard; James Hayward; Daniel Denny; James Dennison; George Davis; Calvin Whiting Haven; Samuel C. Demerest; Thomas Jones; Samuel Whittemore Sloan; Theophilus Stover.
- 1846 - Aldermen: Frederick Gould; Charles Allyn Wells; Thomas Jones; George Edward Head. — Common Council: Samuel C. Nottage; Noah Harrod; George Carlisle; George Cofran; Jeremiah Ross; Thomas Butler Pope; Thomas Haviland; Charles Henry Parker; Nathaniel Wheeler Coffin; William Whitney; Walter Bryent; Henry Waldo Cushing; James Dodd; John L. Emmons; Stephen Tucker; George Washington Frothingham; William Eaton; Seth Adams; John W. Crafts.
- 1847 - Aldermen: John Hubbard Wilkins; Billings Briggs. — Common Council: Noah Lincoln Jr; William Wildes; Edwin Curtis Bailey; George W. Felt; William Whitwell Greenough; Darwin Erasmus Jewett; Eliphalet Jones; William Dawes Coolidge; George Whiting Abbot; Richard Bridge Carter; William Gray Brooks; Samuel Eliot Guild; Francis Gardner; Willard Adams Harrington; William Blake; Tisdale Drake; Samuel Wales Jr; Ezra Lincoln Jr; Jabez Coney; Samuel Shurtleff Perkins; Alvan Simonds.
- 1848 - Aldermen: John Plummer Ober; Moses Grant. — Common Council: John Hillard Bowker; Abel B. Munroe; William Palfrey; George D. Boardman Blanchard; Thomas Critchet; John Phelps Putnam; Josiah Putnam Bradlee; Nathaniel Brewer; Solomon Hopkins; Jesse Maynard; Benjamin James; Joseph Smith.
- 1849 - Alderman: Samuel Hall. — Common Council: Isaiah Faxon; William Parkman; Emory Goss; Julius Auboineau Palmer; Robert Marsh; John Atkins; Nathaniel Seaver; Frederick Crosby; Benjamin Beal; John M. Wright; Charles Brown; Edward Hennessey; Daniel Noyes Haskell; Richard B. Callender; Calvin Whiting Clark; George Woodman; Moses Kimball; Reuben Lovejoy; Manlius Stimson Clarke; George William McLellan; Albert T. Minot; Francis Richards; Samuel Dexter Crane.

=== 1850–1859 ===
- 1850 - Aldermen: Solomon Piper; Henry Manning Holbrook; James Perkins. — Common Council: John Cushing; Solomon Carter; Charles Emerson; Henry Joseph Gardner; William C. Ford; Abraham Gibson Wyman; Avery Plumer Jr; Ebenezer Dale; Samuel Appleton Appleton; David Chapin; John B. Dexter Jr; James W. Sever; Joseph W. Merriam; Aaron Heywood Bean.
- 1851 - Aldermen: Abel B. Munroe; Calvin Whiting Clark; Moses Kimball; Benjamin Smith. — Common Council: James G. Hovey; Joel M. Holden; Charles H. Stearns; Cyrus Washburn; James B. Allen; William Howard Calrow; Richard Shackford; Hiram Bosworth; Thomas Sprague; Andrew Abbot; James Lawrence; Harvey Jewell; Ezekiel Kendall; Oliver B. Dorrance; Francis C. Manning; Peter C. Jones; Otis Kimball; Edward Reed; Andrew J. Loud; Theodore P. Hale; Zibeon Southard.
- 1852 - Aldermen: Benjamin James; Sampson Reed; Jacob Sleeper; Lyman Perry; Benjamin Leach Allen; Thomas Phillips Rich; Isaac Cary. — Common Council: Elijah Stearns; Benjamin Fessenden; Edward A. Vose; George Wilson; Andrew Burnham; Samuel A. Bradbury; Dexter Roby; John James Rayner; Joseph D. Roberts; Paul Adams; William Thomas; Frederick H. Stimpson; Samuel Nicolson; Edward H. Eldredge; Farnham Plummer; Amos Cutler; George Washington Warren; John Odin Jr; John F. Banister; Horace A. Breed; Aaron Hobart; David Hamblen; John Proctor; George N. Noyes; Samuel Rogers Spinney.
- 1853 - Aldermen: James Whiting; Benjamin Franklin White; Oliver Frost. — Common Council: Charles Todd Woodman; Charles A. Turner; Henry D. Gardiner; Daniel Dole Kelly; Benjamin F. Russell; Mical Tubbs; Charles Dupee; William F. Goodwin; Martin L. Hall; Israel C. Rice; Matthew Binney; Ezra Forristall; Francis B. Winter; Henry Fowle Durant; William Washburn; Samuel Hatch; William Burrage; Charles Demond; John H. Thorndike; Calvin P. Hinds; Thacher Beal; Joseph Lawrence Drew; Jonas H. French; Samuel J. M. Homer; Joel Richards; Alexander Hamilton Rice; Stephen Tilton Jr; Gardner P. Drury; John A. Cummings; Charles C. Conley; Joshua Jenkins; William S. Thacher; James F. Whittemore.
- 1854 - Aldermen: John Thomas Dingley; Josiah Dunham Jr; William Washburn; Tisdale Drake; George Frederick Williams; George Odiorne. — Common Council: William P. Howard; John Davis; Morrill Cole; Watson G. Mayo; Ebenezer Atkins; Caleb S. Johnson; Benjamin F. Mahan; George Washington Messinger; John M. Clark; George W. Chipman; Levi Boles; Daniel Warren; George S. Jones; Jonathan Amory Davis; Hiram Simmons; Ebenezer Johnson; Artemas Stone; David Whiton; Charles Owen Rogers; John W. T. Stodder; David Bryant; Hezekiah Prince; John R. Mullin; John W. F. Hobbs; Charles Mayo; Edward H. Brainard.
- 1855 - Aldermen: Robert Cowdin; Samuel Topliff; Thomas Sprague; Joseph Lawrence Drew; Charles Todd Woodman; John M. Clark; Salma Elger Gould; Charles Woodberry; Albion Keith Parris Joy; Benjamin Franklin Cooke; Goorge Washington Messinger. — Common Council: William Marble; Samuel P. Whitman; George Dexter Ricker; Bradbury G. Prescott; Austin Gove; Amos A. Dunnels; Edward Francis Porter; Samuel Jepson; Jonathan B. Severance; William H. Lounsbury; Edward W. Hinks; Robert I. Burbank; Charles B. Farley; Lorenzo S. Cragin; Jerome W. Tyler; Joseph Story; Joseph A. Pond; William Giles Harris; George W. Learnard; Benjamin Franklin Stevens; Alvin Vinal; Hales Wallace Suter; Joseph Buckley; Sylvester P. Gilbert; Frederick L. Washburn; Charles Nowell; William B. Merrill; William Augustus Bell; Samuel W. Ropes; Charles S. Burgess; Eben Tarbell; Jairus A. Frost; George S. Dexter; Daniel Hall; Jedediah P. Bean.
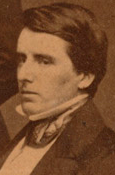
Joseph A. Pond, c. 1855

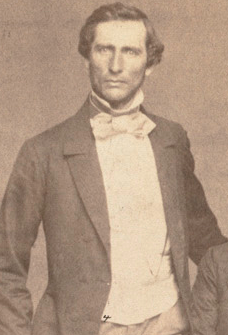
Edward F. Porter, c. 1855

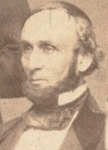
Charles Woodberry, c. 1855

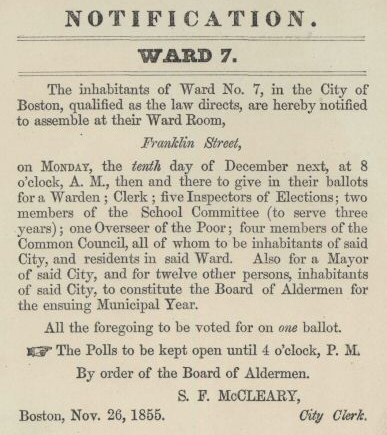
Notice of municipal election, Ward 7, 1855
- 1856 - Aldermen: Eben Jackson; Pelham Bonney; Timothy Converse Kendall; William Howard Calrow; Farnham Plummer; James Cheever; Osmyn Brewster; Levi Benjamin Meriam; Otis Rich; George Washington Torrey; Robert Codman; Joseph Milner Wightman. — Common Council: Oliver Frost; William A. Kruger; Henry A. Dalton; William S. Albertson; James M. Stevens; Lucius A. Bigelow; James W. Russell; John Peak; Jacob Albert Dresser; Oliver Stevens; Reuben Reed; Barnet F. Warner; Daniel J. Coburn; Ezra Farnsworth; John G. Webster; Davis B. Roberts; Rufus B. Bradford; Daniel Cragin; David F. McGilvray; Nahum Morrill Morrison; Lemuel Miles Standish; Robert Slade; Nathaniel Cushing Nash; Francis Jewett Parker; William Fox Richardson; Frederick Fessenden Thayer; Julian Ovando Mason; Ezra Harlow; Freeman Marshall Josselyn Jr; Lewis Gary Whiton; Sumner Crosby.
- 1857 - Aldermen: Solomon Carter; Samuel Hatch; Silas Peirce; James Nute; Timothy Allen Sumner. — Common Council: John B. Wedger; Nehemiah Gibson; Benjamin F. Palmer; Benjamin Pond; James J. Cobb; Samuel Talbot Jr; Francis Edwin Faxon; George N. Nichols; George Atwood Shaw 6; John Stanhope Damrell; George W. Tuxbury; John H. Barry; Henry E. Bayley; George Silsbee Hale; James H. Beal; Benjamin French; Sidney Algernon Stetson; John Tyler; Josiah B. Richardson; Samuel Wallis Waldron Jr; Davis W. Bailey; Henry Mason.
- 1858 - Aldermen: Samuel Dexter Crane; Charles Emerson; Rufus B. Bradford; George Dennie; George Augustus Curtis; Jesse Holbrook; Ebenezer Atkins. — Common Council: John W. Bartlett; Albert Betteley; Horace Poland; John C. Tucker; Francis Dana Stedman; Alexander Wadsworth; William Cross Williamson; Joseph L. Bates; Jairus Beal; Lucius Slade; Joseph Lyman Henshaw; Prescott Barker; Henry Williamson Haynes; Elijah Drew; Timothy R. Page; Thomas M. Howard; Edward F. Robinson; John A. Warren; Edward F. Hall; William S. McGowan; Calvin Allen Richards; Benjamin B. Brown; George P. French; Henry B. Janes; Chauncy Page.
- 1859 - Aldermen: Clement Willis; William Welden Allen; Joseph Tilden Bailey; Thomas Coffin Amory Jr; Otis Clapp. — Common Council: Samuel Brown Krogman; Cornelius Doherty; Gilbert E. Pierce; Joseph Robbins; William Clark Burgess; Thomas Mooney; Theophilus Burr Jr; John H. Robinson; Philip Howes Sears; Jabez Frederick; Gharles J. McCarthy; James Riley; John Steele Tyler; Jonas Fitch; John Langdon Batchelder; William Carpenter; Horace Jenkins; Levi Lincoln Willcutt; Justin Jones; Ansel Lothrop; William Warland Clapp Jr; Joseph Frost Paul; Osborn Howes; Joel Baker Jr.

=== 1860–1869 ===
- 1860 - Aldermen: Francis Edwin Faxon; Harrison Otis Briggs; James Laighton Hanson. — Common Council: John Dacey; Thomas A. Mathews; Albert P. Morrison; Daniel Goodwin; George Thomas Sampson; John Allison; John Milton Roberts; William Edward Webster; Lyman Sawin Hapgood; Nathaniel C. A. Preble; Benjamin Greenleaf Boardman; Gardiner Howland Shaw; John Leahy; Joseph Hildreth Bradley; Samuel A. B. Bragg; George Partridge Sanger; William Bentley Fowle Jr; Joseph W. Howard; Henry Souther; George Washington Sprague; Benjamin Pope.
- 1861 - Aldermen: Samuel Rogers Spinney; Nehemiah Gibson; George Washington Parmenter; Moses Clark; John Francis Pray; Elisha Tyson Wilson. — Common Council: Andrew Ainsworth; John William Leighton; Cornelius Murphy; Horace Dodd; Albert Bowker; Stephen N. Stockwell; Sylvanus Allen Denio; John Rogers; Philip O. Donnell; Seldon Crockett; Elias E. Davison; Benjamin Franklin Edmands; Daniel H. Whitney; Daniel Carr Jr; John S. Pear; Daniel Davies; Henry W. Foley; Morris C. Fitch; Frederick Grant; John Coffin Jones Brown; William A. Clark; Francis H. Ward; John Borrowscale; Joseph F. Huntress; Joshua Dorsey Ball; John C. Fallon; Hollis Randall Gray.
- 1862 - Aldermen: Francis Richards No; Joseph Lyman Henshaw; Joseph Frost Paul; Calvin Allen Richards; Otis Norcross. — Common Council: Dennis Bonner; Matthew Keany; Richard Beeching; George Hinman; Augustus Reed; Bernard Cullen; John Glancy; Joseph Andrew Brown; Linus Mason Child; Michael F. Wells; William Emery Bicknell; George P. Clapp; George Otis Shattuck; Edward Ryan; Windsor Hatch; Franklin H. Sprague; Samuel G. Bowdlear; William Hormby Ireland; Loring B. Barnes; Cyrus Hicks; Horace Bullard Fisher; Lucius A. Cutler; Henry A. Drake; Stanley Gore.
- 1863 - Aldermen: Sylvanus Allen Denio; Robert Marsh; Lemuel Miles Standish; John Steele Tyler; Hiram Ambrose Stevens. — Common Council: Patrick McLaughlin; Charles Rankin McLean; Nicholas J. Bean; John Minot Fiske; Granville Mears; William Wilkins Warren; Joseph Allen; Joseph Richardson; David Hill Coolidge; Charles Woodbury; John P. Ordway; Daniel J. Sweeney; John Tisdale Bradlee; Gilbert C. Brown; John C. Haynes; Patrick F. Logan; Nathaniel Adams; William Cumston; Nathan Morse; William Gallagher; Lewis J. Bird.
- 1864 - Aldermen: George Washington Warren; Nathaniel Cushing Nash; William Warland Clapp Jr; George Washington Sprague; Daniel Davies; Charles Francis Dana. — Common Council: Jabez Fisher Hewes; Albert Stevens Pratt; John Turner; William W. Elliott; Nathaniel McKay; Edwin Mason Putnam; Lewis Rice; Patrick H. Farren; Robert Bunten; Thomas Gaffield; Patrick Tracy Jackson; William Mooney; Samuel Harvey Loring; Thomas Francis Richardson; Joshua Putnam Preston; Cadis Barney Boyce; Solomon B. Stebbins; George Parmer Darrow; Moses Wright Richardson; Charles W. Livermore; Thomas Gogin; Horace Smith; Moses Colman.
- 1865 - Aldermen: Edward Francis Porter; Thomas Gaffield. — Common Council: John Miller; Andrew Hall; Allen Riley; John F. Flynn; Joel Gray; Noah Webster Farley; Augustine G. Stimson; Weston Lewis; Jarvis Dwight Braman; Francis Winthrop Palfrey; James Joseph Flynn; William Driver Park; Walbridge Abner Field; Horace Leander Bowker; Job T. Souther; Benjamin Dean; Freeborn Adams Jr.
- 1866 - Aldermen: Jonas Fitch; Charles Wesley Slack; Gilbert Wait; Noah Mayo Jr. — Common Council: William James Ellis; Francis James Munroe; Moses B. Tower; Dennis Cawley Jr; Murdock Matheson; Elam W. Hale; Increase Eldredge Noyes; Alfonso Bowman; Christopher Augustus Connor; Thomas Leavitt; Hugh Ambrose Madden; Michael Carney; Israel Smith Trafton; Edward Augustus White; William Sanford Hills; George Nowell; Jeremiah L. Newton; Daniel Gorton Grafton; Samuel W. Hodges; Charles Caverly Jr; Matthias Rich; Jonas Ball; Hubbard Winslow Tilton; Henry Dwight Hyde; Solomon S. Gray; Henry E. Bradlee.

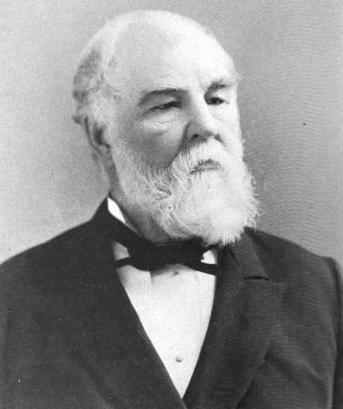
Newton Talbot; served as alderman 1867

- 1867 - Aldermen: William Cumston; Charles Rankin McLean; Albert Stevens Pratt; Jarvis Dwight Braman; Edward Augustus White; Walter Edward Hawes; Newton Talbot. — Common Council: William Woolley; George E. Young; Michael Carney; John Furness Jarvis; Edward R. Merritt; Charles R. Train; Edward E. Batchelder; Francis Augustus Osborn; Hiram Burr Crandall; Oliver Cromwell Livermore; William H. Emerson; Warren Lothrop Tower; Henry Clement Lougee; George Baxter Jr; Sewall B. Bond; Lucius W. Knight; William R. Bryden; Frederick A. Wilkins; Albert F. Upton; Charles Hastings Allen; Ivory Bean; Henry Warren Wilson; Howard A. Doe.
- 1868 - Aldermen: Nathaniel Seaver; Samuel Crocker Cobb; Moses Fairbanks. — Common Council: James Byron Nason; Joshua Weston; Thomas Dinsmore; Edward Malone; Thomas Leighton Jenks; Lyman Alonzo Belknap; Zimri B. Heywood; Michael J. Driscoll; William M. Flanders; Francis Wayland Jacobs -; Sereno T. Thayer; Horace Goodman Tucker; Robert Bishop; Michael G. Minon; John White; Sidney Squires; Samuel Rice; Ebenezer Nelson; Charles S. Butler; George P. Denny; Horace Tyler Rockwell; Samuel B. Hopkins; Samuel Thomas Snow; Albert Judd Wright; William Treadwell Van Nostrand; Thomas Dolan; Benjamin Franklin; Lemuel Foster Morse; Joseph T. Ryan; William Hobbs Jr; Augustus Parker; Henry B. Phelps; Henry White Pickering; James Monroe Keith; Everett C. Kingsbury; John Austin Rogers; Horace H. White.
- 1869 - Aldermen: Lewis Rice; John Tisdale Bradlee; William Treadwell Van Nostrand; George Partridge Baldwin. — Common Council: Jeremiah Hobbs Pote; Thomas Doherty; George Going; Nathan Hagar Daniels; Amos Lucian Noyes; Milford Joy Coyle; Grenville Temple Winthrop Braman; Albert Frye Cole; Winslow Bradford Lucas; James K. Crowley; Edmund B. Vannevar; William Frost; Albert Gay; George Edward Learned; John Osborne Poor; George H. Johnston; Solomon Adams Woods; Melville Ezra Ingalls; Jeremiah M. Mullane; George C. Pearson; David P. Davis; Gurdon C. Judson; Giles Hopkins Rich; Nathan D. Conant.

=== 1870–1879 ===
- 1870 - Aldermen: Christopher Augustus Connor; Francis Wayland Jacobs; Grenville Temple Winthrop Braman; George Washington Pope; Charles Edwin Jenkins; George O. Carpenter; Henry Lillie Pierce. — Common Council: Joseph H. Barnes; William Francis Brooks; Thomas W. Brown Jr; William Taylor; Albert Cushman Pond; Eugene C. Donnelly; Charles Brooks Perkins; Barney Hull; John Joseph Murphy; John Quinn; Stephen Rensselaer Niles; George Middleton Barnard Jr; John O. Brien; John Henry Giblin; Patrick O. Connor; Isaac Hale Robbins; John Sam Moulton; Calvin M. Winch; Solomon Sewall Rowe; William Jamieson Smith; Daniel Augustus Patch; William C. Roberts; John Bullard Meads; William Morse; Franklin Williams; Joel Seaverns; Adams Ayer; Herman D. Bradt; James Devine; Patrick Henry Rogers; Charles D. Bickford; William Pope; William Say; Thomas French Temple; George Lathe Burt.
- 1871 - Aldermen: Avery Plumer; George Dexter Ricker; Samuel Talbot Jr; William Woolley; Samuel Little; Leonard Richardson Cutter. — Common Council: James Smith; Frederick Pease; William Cunningham; George S. Kendall; Thomas R. Jacobs; Stephen Decatur Salmon Jr; Alfred Alonzo Clatur; John Robertson; John W. Foye; Henry Nathan Stone; William Edward Perkins; David Locke Webster; Robert McDevitt; Edward J. Long; Washington L. Prescott; James Davis Knowles Willis; Stephen Locke Emery; Wallace Fullam Robinson; Marquis Fayette Dickinson Jr; Charles Henry Hersey; John Henry Locke; Thomas Brennan; Theodore C. Faxon; Isaac Paul Gregg; Alfred Heyer Perry; William Henry West.
- 1872 - Aldermen: Thomas Leighton Jenks; Sidney Squires; William Say; Stephen Abbot Stackpole; John Taylor Clark; William Chadwell Poland; James Power. — Common Council: Neil Doherty; Patrick Collins; Timothy J. Dacey; Thomas J. Anderson; George Parkman Kingsley; Horace E. Walker; Edward Olcott Shepard; Horace Loring; Francis Michael Hughes; Edward J. Holmes; John Bernard Martin; John Edward Fitzgerald; Abraham John Lamb; Charles Darrow; Benjamin Heath; David Whiston; Cyrus Andrew Page; Edward Payson Wilbur; James Freeman Marston; John Johnson McNutt; Frederick Samuel Risteen; Wilmon Whilldin Blackmar; Asa Harden Caton; William Henry Hart; Daniel Dowd; Bartholomew Dolan; William Hatch Jones; William G. Thacher; Hiram Augustus Wright; Charles Augustus Burditt; Hartford Davenport.
- 1873 - Aldermen: Solomon B. Stebbins; John Brown; Alanson Bigelow; Hiram Emery; Charles Hulbert; Samuel Miller Quincy. — Common Council: William McKenney; Thomas H. Doherty; Jacob Abbott; Charles Edward Powers; Michael James Flatley; John W. Mahan; Robert McCue; Elijah B. Hine; John Madden; Henry W. Harrington; Edwin Hutton Woods; John Quincy Adams Brackett; Andrew Jackson Hall; Samuel S. Cudworth; Hillman B. Barnes; Harrison Loring; Hiram A. Bowles; Alonzo Warren; William G. Train; William Elliot Woodward; Charles G. Davis; Ebenezer Adams; Halsey Joseph Boardman; Pierpont Edwards; Frederick Bleiler; Michael Kelley; James Humphreys Upham.
- 1874 - Aldermen: William Francis Brooks; Andrew Jackson Hall; Charles Jones Prescott; Thomas Burdett Harris; Francis Alonzo Peters; Roland Worthington. — Common Council: Frederick B. Day; Rufus Cushman; Michael D. Collins; James Bent; Thomas Mooney; George F. Gordon; Thomas Charles Butler; Henry Harrison Sprague; Michael H. McCarty; Richard Jennings; David Pulsifer Kimball; Samuel H. Russell; Uriel Haskell Crocker; Edward William Barry; Frank B. Brown; Francis H. Peabody; John Sweetser; Zenas E. Smith; Henry Lowell Leach; John Goldthwait; Horace M. Bearce; Frederick Griswold Walbridge; Nathan S. Wilbur; Thacher F. Sweat; Henry Ware Putnam; Henry W. Fuller; Samuel Cony Perkiris; Alexander Beal; William Minot Jr; Francis Hunnewell; Patrick Moley; Edwin Sibley; James F. Dacey; William H. Kent; Francis William Pray; George H. Long; John Tyler Hicks.
- 1875 - Aldermen: William Pope; Abraham Orlando Bigelow; Alvah Augustus Burrage; Clinton Viles; Hugh O'Brien; — Common Council: Emery Dyer Leighton; Jeremiah Harrigan; Charles Marvel Kingsley; Jeremiah A. Murray; Albus R. Cushing; William Henry Whitmore; Alexander Fairfield Wadsworth; John H. Walsh; John Augustus Duggan; Ward; Curtis Guild; Walter Harmon; Patrick Barry; Thomas J. Fitzpatrick; John Osborne Jr; Francis Jaques; Eugene Henry Sampson; Joseph Augustus Felt; Otis H. Pierce; Osborne Howes Jr; George Leonard Damon; James A. Lappen; Ephraim D. Whitcomb; George J. Coyle; Lowell Brigham Hiscock; John F. Newton; Isaac P. Clarke; Omar Loring; Charles F. Curtis; Charles E. Rice; Ezra Jackson Trull; Benjamin Franklin Stacey; John Kelley; John N. Devereux; Richard Power.
- 1876 - Aldermen: George Thomas Sampson; Liverus Hull; Francis Thompson; Choate Burnham; Thomas Jones Whidden. — Common Council: Edwin R. Webster; Edward Pearl; William J. Burke; Albert H. Taylor; Marcellus Day; Phinehas J. Stone Jr; Stephen G. Jones; Franklin Oliver Reed; George F. Shepard; Sidney E. Adams; Michael Barr; John William Fraser; Daniel Doherty; Joseph Doherty; James O. Donnell; Warren Kendall Blodgett; James Hall Jr; George Lewis Ruffin; John A. Smardon; Alfred Israel Woodbury; James W. Fox; John Mullen; Martin Luther Ham; Richard Pope; Francis Allen Davis; Abraham Firth; William Tuttle; William Everett Shay; Christopher J. Spenceley; James Benton Graham; Joseph Morrill Jr; William Blanchard; Benjamin Holt Ticknor; John Wilder May; James Homer Pierce.
- 1877 - Aldermen: Lucius Slade; John Edward Fitzgerald; Charles Henry Bass Breck; George Dunbar; Richard Worth Robinson; Charles Woodard Wilder. — Common Council: James J. Doherty; George Larkin Thorndike; George B. Webster; Peter Stillings Roberts; Frederick B. Day; Norman Young Brintnall; John H. Dee; John Kelley; John Augustine Kidney; Richard Roach; Peter Cannon; Edward O. Donnell; Patrick F. McGaragle; Thomas O. Connor; Robert Means Thompson; James Bailey Richardson; James Hutchins Danforth; Oscar Brownell Mowry; Roger Wolcott; Jeremiah Henry Mullane; Patrick Francis McDonald; James F. McClusky; James W. Loughlin; Joaquin Kilvert Souther; Oliver George Fernald; Robert Cox; John Cross; Andrew Jackson; Dennis Ambrose Flynn; Salmon P. Hibbard; Charles Henry Reed; James Henry Nugent; James Fagan; Charles Edward Pratt; James Joseph Barry; Henry Francis Coe; Alfred Staniford Brown; Charles S. Perham; Coolidge Barnard; Robert Vose Jr; Webster F. Warren.
- 1878 - Aldermen: Lewis Cary Whiton; Samuel Cony Perkins; Curtis Guild; George Burrell Faunce; Charles Hayden; Josiah Shepard Robinson; John Perrin Spaulding. — Common Council: James Woolley; Harvey Newton Shepard; Benjamin Brintnall; Nathaniel D. Toppan; George H. Lovering; Charles W. Howland; John Drynan; Alexander B. McGahey; Dennis O. Connor; Lemuel Meader Ham; John J. Smith; Nathaniel Johnson Rust; Charles Wheeler; Thomas Joseph Denney; Thomas Henry Devlin; James Aloysius McGeough; Howard Clapp; Thomas Hill; Albert Frederic Lauten; John Tavlor; Isaac Rosnosky; Jesse Leonard Nason; John Freeman Colby; Oscar Hallett Sampson; Nathan Sawyer; John P. Santry; John Patrick Brawley; Paul Henry Kendricken; William E. Whitcher; Thomas Edwin Wilson; George H. Wyman; Francis J; Charles Herbert Plimpton; Henry Nathan Sawyer; George Warren Hollis; Jacob F. Taylor.
- 1879 - Aldermen: Daniel Dole Kelly; Benjamin Pope; James Joseph Flynn; Joseph Augustus Tucker; George Edwin Bell. — Common Council: Martin Moore Hancock; Cornelius Francis Doherty; John Thomas Hayes; Frank Eliot Sweetser; William Hanson Howard; Otis B. Dudley; John Paul Hilton; Andrew A. O'Dowd; Stephen F. McLaughlin; Roger John Kelley; John Doherty; Charles V. Bunten; James Christal; Henry Parkman; Malcolm Scollay Greenough; Henry Walton Swift; Joseph Healy; Charles F. Austin; Nicholas Furlong; Francis O. Brien; John Cannon; George Henry Cavanagh; Evan H. Morgan; John Elliott Bowker; George T. Perkins; John William Morrison; Thomas Norton Hart; Benjamin Franklin Anthony; Patrick James Maguire; John Andrew Slattery; Timothy A. Murphy; Michael William Costello; John Eli Blakemore; Albert Thomas Stearns; George Albert Fisher; John A. Sawyer.

=== 1880–1889 ===
- 1880 - Aldermen: Asa Harden Caton; Frederick Griswold Walbridge; George Larkin Thorndike; Charles Varney Whitten; Joseph Caldwell. — Common Council: Clarence Parker Lovell; Daniel J. Sweeney; Hiram I. Nason; Matthew Walsh; Andrew Jackson Bailey; Philip J. McLaughlin; Edward Dixon; John Patrick Joseph; William Joseph Welch; John Bernard Fitzpatrick; Alden Everett Viles; James Goldthwaite Freeman Alder; man; Eugene Bigelow Hagar; William Fisher Wharton; Charles Herbert Williams; Patrick H. Cronin; Martin Thomas Folan; John I. Lane; Lewis Raymond Tucker; Charles William Donahoe; Frank Foster Farwell; Henry Elisha Hosley; David Franklin Barry; Dudley Richards Child; Nathaniel Brimbecom; Jeremiah J. McNamara; Abraham Theobald Rogers; Horace Beals Clapp; Austin Bigelow.
- 1881 - Aldermen: Charles Henry Hersey; George Curtis; Cyrus Summerfield Haldeman; William Frost. — Common Council: Peter Morrison; Jesse Morse Gove; Christopher Patrick Conlin; Charles Francis Quigley; William L. Harding; Francis J. Murphy; Henry Ward Beecher Cotton; Samuel Josiah Harrison; George Frederick Mullett; James F. Daly; Martin Sumner McCormick; John Aloysius McLaughlin; John Joseph Foyle; James W. Pope; Prentiss Cummings; George Lewis Huntress; Charles A. Powers; Joseph Binard Gomez; Otis Dexter Dana; William Eustis Bartlett; Leander Beal; William H. Ford; Thomas Jefferson Emery; James Teevan; William Caverly Fisk; Arthur Frederick Means; Joseph Patrick Connell; Nathan Gilman Smith; Thomas Richard Mathews; Nelson Sumner Wakefield; Reuben Samuel Swan; Otis Eddy.
- 1882 - Aldermen: Benjamin Franklin Anthony; Thomas Norton Hart; Laban Pratt; Clinton White. — Common Council: Benjamin P. Bates; James Edmund Fitzgerald; Alfred N. Proctor; Ernest Clifton Marshall; Horace E. Boynton; Patrick John Donovan; Michael J. Houghton; Daniel McLaughlin; John Joseph Cannon; Godfrey Morse; Edward Perry Fisk; John Davis Williams French; James Henry Stack; James Ambrose Murphy; William Henry Frizzell; Charles H. Orr; James Donovan; Frederick Bourne Taylor; John Good; Felix Aloysius Strange; Michael J. Killion; Charles Henry Wise; Munroe Chickering; Joseph Francis Howland; John Henry Lee.
- 1883 - Aldermen: Francis William Pray; Thomas Henry Devlin; Paul Henry Kendricken; William Joseph Welch; Edwin Forrest Leighton. — Common Council: Edwin Grosvenor Smith; Walter F. Burk; William Abraham Foss; George E. Bacon; Joseph W. Peterson; Samuel Lombard; Harvey Newton Collison; James H. Gallagher; Robert Donnelly; Francis Patrick Maguire; Andreas Blume; Eugene David Sullivan; Patrick Leo Cassidy; George Francis Henry Murray; Benjamin W. Dean; Charles Michael Bromwich; George Henry Bond; John Edward Lappen; James F. Marley; Aaron Francis Richards; Samuel Hichborn; Francis L. White; William A. Thomes; John Albree; Edward Jacob Hathorne; Thomas O Flynn; John P. O'Brien; Francis Anthony Strater; Chauncey Thomas; Lewis Wheaton Morse; James Goodman; Edward Finnerty; Asa Spalding Weld.
- 1884 - Aldermen: Oliver George Fernald; James Henry Nugent Coundlman; Malcolm Scollay Greenough; John William McDonald; Andrew Marathon Morton. — Common Council: John E. Lynch; William Henry Harrison Emmons; John Henry Sullivan; Michael G. Lynch; Francis W. Curry; Hugh E. Brady; E. Gerry Brown; Lyman Haven Bigelow; Thomas Hinds Green; Patrick Kearins; John Doherty; William Taylor Jr; William J. Reagan; John E. McNellev; Alfred D wight Foster; Herbert Lee Harding; Daniel Foster Farrar; Michael H. Burke; Henry J. McKee; Samuel Kelley; Dennis A.Horgan; Charles Wilbur Whitcomb; William J. Kilduff; Lewis Grieve Farmer; William McKinley Osborne; Henry Phillips Oakman; Frank E. Brigham; James Granville Young Jr; William Mackin.
- 1885 - Aldermen: James Smith; Patrick John Donovan; Jeremiah Henry Mullane; Charles Hastings Allen; Benjamin French Cutter. — Common Council: Bedfield Erskine; William Henry Murphy; George Nelson Fisher Jr; William H. Miller; William P. Henry; Edward L. Quigley; John Gallagher; Richard J. Murray; William Oscar Armstrong; Benjamin B. Jenks; Jacob Fottler; Thomas Prince Beal; Edward John Jenkins; William Peter Cherrington; William A. Daly; James F. Murphy; Thomas Joseph Keliher; William English; William Edward Hodgkins; Thomas F. Fallon; Patrick Edward Riddle; Albert Watson Hersey; Henry S. Dewey; Patrick Henry Costello; Francis B. Kelley; Edward Payson Butler; John F. Brown.
- 1886 - Aldermen: John Henry Sullivan; Michael Barr; James Goldthwaite Freeman; William Patrick Carroll; Charles Michael Bromwich; Patrick James Maguire; Nathan Gilman Smith; Henry Francis Coe; Samuel John Capen. — Common Council: Nathaniel March Jewett; John Archibald Webster; Thomas Owen McEnaney; Benjamin Joseph Sullivan; WardS; Joseph H. Carroll; Patrick Coyle; Edwin F. Dunn; Samuel J. Cochran; Edward F. Reilly; William J. Mahoney; Christopher O. Brien; Edward A. Rogan; William Bernarden Francis Whall; William Power Wilson; Nathaniel Watson Ladd; William Reuben Richards; George Partridge Sanger Jr; John J. Egan; Edward Joseph Leary; Edward J. Powers; William Sarsfield McNary; Robert Provan; John W. Hayes; Whittemore Rowell; Alpheus Sanford; Henry Frost; Augustus Gordon Perkins; Frank Bartlett Thayer; Bartholomew J. Connolly; Thomas Hugh Duggan; James F. Davern; John Murphy; Cassius Clay Powers; Julius D. Whipple; Thomas Hendee Hickey; Robert William Light; William Scollans.
- 1887 - Aldermen: John Aloysius McLaughlin; Tilly Haynes; Charles Whipple Smith; John Henry Lee. — Common Council: Henry Carstensen; Frank Robert Morrison; Jeremiah F. Coleman; Peter J. Gallagher; John F. Sundberg; Maurice Joseph McKenna; Augustus L. Perry; John J. Murphy; Roger Haggerty; Edward J. Harrington; Thomas Francis Kelley; John J. Kennedy; Andrew Berkley Lattimore; Frank Morison; Edward Sullivan; Cornelius Francis Desmond; Thomas Francis Tracy; John James Teevens; Frank Jefferson Tuttle; Michael Joseph Carroll; Thomas Francis Nunan; Robert Howard Bowman; John William O Mealey; Samuel Edward Shaw; Ward; James H. Sullivan; Charles Havey Dolan; John Homans Norton; See No; John Charles Short; Richard Sullivan; Lewis L. P. Atwood; Sidney Leeland Burr; George Robert Fowler; Louis Munroe Clark; Edmund Francis Snow; John T. Chamberlain.
- 1888 - Aldermen: Jesse Morse Gove; Philip Joseph Doherty; William Power Wilson; James Ambrose Murphy; Samuel Kelley; John Charles Short; Homer Rogers; Otis Eddy. — Common Council: Joseph Benjamin Maccabe; Frank Casey; Robert C. Fanning; Frank Eugene Bagley; Francis Henry Dillon; Michael John Mitchell; William Herbert Oakes; Israel Frank Pierce; Patrick Cannon; Neil J. Gillespie; Thomas Francis Keenan; Joseph Patrick Lomasney; George Wesley Boynton; Charles Joseph Brooks; Francis William Sprague; James Means; Frank Ellery Winslow; James Bernard Hayes; Jeremiah Stephen Mahoney; Michael William Norris; John McNamara; James Francis Mullen; William James Murphy; William Henry Vialle; William Stanford Stevens; Thomas Francis Lyons; John James Hoar; John Patrick Kelley; Horace Gwynne Allen; William Gardner Reed; Sidney Cushing; Anton Peters; Andrew J. Robinson; John Comerford.
- 1889 - Aldermen: Benjamin Franklin Stacey; Albert Alonzo Folsom; Homer Rogers; William Gardner Reed. — Common Council: Lewis Burnham; John Andolph Campbell; Frank Cushing Wood; Patrick H. Quinn; William Joseph Doherty; Tobias Beck; Edward Everett Drew; Benjamin Franklin Hatch; William Thomas Graham; Neil Francis Doherty; James Daniel Doherty; James Joseph Donnelly; Daniel Francis Breen; Nathaniel Goddard Robinson; Albert Harrison Hall; Charles Edward Harris; George von Lengerke Meyer; Bowdoin Strong Parker; Charles Franklin Sprague; Perlie Appleton Dyar; Francis Cabot Lowell; Ira Loriston Moore; John Francis Joseph Mulhall; Charles James Chance; Nicholas Francis McCarthy; Samuel Hood Wise; Edward Patrick Barry; James M. O'Brien; John Augustine Keefe; William Warren Towle; Maurice J. Hahlo; George Evans Lovett; Andrew Peter McCauley; Benjamin Franklin Brown; Melancthon Ware Burlen; John Francis Kinney; Frederick Peterson Knapp; Franklin Plummer Pierce; Walter Lawton Hayes; Harlan Page Paige; Henry B. Goodenough; George Francis Mitchell.

=== 1890–1899 ===
- 1890 - Aldermen: William Power Wilson (chairman); Thomas William Flood; Charles Burr Woolley; Herbert Schaw Carruth; Wesley Austin Gove; Edward Joseph Leary; Homer Rogers; Sidney Cushing. — Common Council: John Joseph Cotter; Patrick Cornelius Kelly; John Joseph Mahoney; John Patrick Reed; Henry Warren Woodbury; James Gilfillian Jones; Charles Carroll; Edward William Dixon; John James Irving; Edward Patrick Clark; James Benjamin Hamilton; Michael Bartholomew Gilbride; Arthur Langdon Spring; Charles Wallace Hallstram; Patrick Joseph Heffernin; Daniel Patrick Toomey; John Henry Griffin; George Augustus Whiteley; Jacob Nelson Goodnough; Francis Edwin Park; Osgood Chandler Blaney; Joseph James Casey; Isaac Paul Hutchinson; Abraham Captaine Ratshesky; Thomas Talbot; Paul Cuff Brooks; Charles Henry Bryant; Thomas Caldwell Thompson; John Davidson Wayne; Charles Edward Wiggin Jr; Horace Bacon; Bernice Jenkins Noyes; James Benjamin Light; Frederic Eaton.
- 1891 - Aldermen: Herbert Schaw Carruth (chairman); Thomas Francis Keenan; George von Lengerke Meyer; Nathaniel Johnson Rust; Weston Lewis; Martin Regan; Lewis Grieve Farmer. — Common Council: John L. Bates; Hugh L. Stalker; Thomas Arthur; William J. Donovan; Michael J. Tierney; William H. Boardman; Myron D. Cressy; John Hurley; James W. O Brien; Elliott D. Robbins; Patrick F. Brogan; Cornelius H. Toland; Patrick Higgins; Hugh McLaughlin; Nelson G. Gaskins; Seth P. Smith; Clarence P. Weston; Frank H. Briggs; John Quinn Jr; Andrew J. Quinn; James H. Coughlin; John A. Daunt; Josiah S. Dean; Charles H. Dirksmeyer; Timothy J. Sullivan; John B. Cadigan; Abraham Levy; William R. Browne; William Gordon; Mark H. Lynch; Hugh Gilligan; William B. McClellan; George H. Murray; Frank F. Proctor; John J. Kane; Charles E. Folsom Jr Aldemian; Fred H. Young.
- 1892 - Aldermen: John H. Lee (chairman); Michael John Mitchell; Jacob Fottler; William Alonzo Folsom; John Francis Dever. — Common Council: James A. Cochran; Cornelius J. Flynn; Frank McGinniss; John M. O Hara; Albert W. Forbush; Frank A. Teeling; John F. Fitzgerald; Cornelius Doherty; Timothy F. Murphy; William Francis Donovan; Walden Banks; Sidney B. Everett; William C. Parker; Royal Robbins; Michael T. Callahan; William J. Welch; John Merrill; William J. Sullivan; Frederick S. Gore; John J. Healy; James Keenan; Charles H. Reinhart; Charles E. Clark; Andrew J. Patterson; Nicholas J. Quinn; Albert C. Smith; Hubert B. Curley; Thomas H. Boyd; Albert C. Burrage; George M. Scates; Frederick C. Bleiler; William F. Finneran; Patrick F. Gormley; Edward F. Draper; John B. Patterson; Edward Farrell; Frank H. Ricker.
- 1893 - Aldermen: Charles Thomas Witt; Martin Michael Lomasney; John J. Maguire; Alpheus Sanford; William L. Mooney; Charles Wallace Hallstram; Charles Edward Folsom. — Common Council: George R. W. Battis; David H. Jones Jr; Manassah E. Bradley; Michael W. Collins; William H. Fallon; Timothy J. Donovan; William H. Marnell; Jeremiah E. Mahoney; Christopher F. O Brien; Daniel D. Rourke; Bernard McMackin; David T. King; Charles H. Hall; Joshua B. Holden; Timothy J. Crowley; John B. Collins; William E. Mansfield; John P. O Connor; Daniel A. McCarthy; William Berwin; Freeman O. Emerson; John H. Colby; Henry S. Fisher; Charles C. Collins; Norman Mintz; Michael J. Lyons; Albert Wise; Richard F. Andrews Jr; Walter C. Brown; Charles J. Jacobs; William A. Davis; James H. Kelly; Herbert M. Manks; George I. Robinson Jr; J. Harris Aubin; Samuel H. Mitchell.
- 1894 - Aldermen: Alpheus Sanford (chairman); Charles Henry Bryant; Bordman Hall; Edward Webb Presho; David Franklin Barry. — Common Council: John W. Hayes; Michael J. Leary; Peter F. Tague; Martin F. Connorton; William J. Miller; James T. Roche; Patrick J. Carroll; George F. Coleman; Daniel A. Whelton; J. Henderson Allston; Stanley Ruffin; Calvin M. Lewis; Edward H. McGuire; Walter L. Sears; John J. Browne; John E. Baldwin; Jeffrey R. Eager; Michael J. Reidy; Timothy J. Wholey; Joseph L. Bartlett; Daniel F. Connor; Edwin S. Fields; William W. Davis; William M. Mclnness; Edward H. Costello; Thomas Reynolds; Frederick A. Wood; Eugene A. Reed Jr.
- 1895 - Aldermen: Perlie Appleton Dyar; Horace Gwynne Allen. — Common Council: Joseph H. Barnes Jr; John E. Lowden; Joseph H. Corny; John L. Kelly; James F. Haley; John J. O'Callaghan; George A. Garland; William E. Mahoney; James J. Brock; James A. Doherty; James C. Murphy; Simon Hirshon; John R. Foster; Edward S. Crockett; George U. Crocker; Timothy J. Butler; William H. Woods; John H. Dunn; Edward C. Cadigan; John J. Mahoney; Patrick Bowen; John J. Gartland Jr; Benjamin C. Lane; John W. Johnson; G. Waldon Smith; George W. Bennett; Michael E. Gaddis; Timothy E. McCarthy; Samuel C. Jones; Alfred Newmarch; Chauncey K. Bullock; Edward Orchard; Franklin L. Codman; Walter W. Strangman; William M. Farrington; Francis F. Morton.
- 1896 - Aldermen: Samuel Darius Charles; William Francis Donovan; William Joseph Donovan; John Joseph Mahoney. — Common Council: Collingwood C. Millar; William B. Whitney; John E. McCarthy; Dennis J. Falvey; John A. Ryan; James H. Shannon; Michael J. McColgan; John A. Rowan; Francis J. Horgan; Daniel J. Kiley; Nelson I. Southwick; Alfred H. Colby; Alfred F. Kenney; John J. Falvey; Hugh W. Bresnahan; James T. Mahoney Jr; Patrick J. O Toole; William P. Hickey; Thomas F. Donovan; John Dugan; David F. McCarthy; George G. Banchor; Charles Hiller Innes; Sidney Moulthorp; Arthur G. Wood; Thomas L. Noonan; George Whittaker; Timothy L. Connolly; Albert C. Sawyer; Charles P. Nangle; Charles W. Dennis; John A. Maier Jr; Thomas C. Bachelder; Elmer E. Chain.
- 1897 - Aldermen: William Berwin; Franklin Lincoln Codman; John Henry Colby; Josiah Stevens Dean; William Henry Lott; Milton Coburn Paige. — Common Council: Charles I. Albee; A. Dudley Bagley; William J. Cronin; James H. Donovan; Henry B. Carroll; John I. Toland; John W. Donahue; Joseph A. Turnbull; Michael J. Donovan; W. T. A. Fitzgerald; Thomas Mackey; William H. Roth; Louis Sonnabend; Michael Leonard; Maurice J. McCarthy; George S. Brooks; Walter E. Nichols; Charles R. Saunders; George H. Tinkham; John B. Dumond; Edward P. Sands; James F. Mulcahy; Daniel V. Mclsaac; Oliver F. Davenport; Frederick W. Farwell; Arthur P. Russell; John P. Lanergan; James J. Casey; John H. Daly; John F. Dempsey; John J. Flanagan; Wilbur F. Adams; Edwin D. Bell; Louis T Ho; Charles F. Adams; William Dallow Jr; Konrad Young; William E. Harvey; Willard W. Hibbard; Harry B. Whall; Ezra N. Rolland; William D. Wheeler.
- 1898 - Aldermen: Michael Henry Cleary; Joseph Aloysius Conry; Edward William Dixon; Joseph James Norton; Frank John O Toole. — Common Council: Joseph F. Hickey; William F. Harrington; Charles A. Horrigan; John F. Desmond; John P. Sullivan; William E. Bennett; Edward H. Madden; Samuel H. Borofsky; Daniel J. Donnelly; John L. Donovan; William H. Cuddy; Michael F. Hart; Frank H. Cowin; Samuel Kasanof; Charles A. Atkins; David R. Robinson; Edward A. Armistead; William S. B. Stevens; David B. Chamberlain; Thomas J. Collins; Michael J. Lydon; John D. Fenton; William Martin; Charles E. Eddy; Patrick H. Brennan; John J. Curley; James A. Watson; Michael T. Athridge; Frederick W. Klemm; Paul F. Folsom; Abram Jordan; Andrew Brauer; Clarence W. Sanderson,.
- 1899 - Aldermen: Wilbur Fiske Adams; Michael William Brick; Frederick William Day; James Henry Doyle; Patrick Francis McDonald. — Common Council: George H. Battis; David W. Simpson; Frank J. Johnson; Thomas F. Rice; Francis J. Doherty; Thomas A. Kelley; John F. Gibbons; Andrew A. Badaracco; Patrick H. Bradley; William J. O Brien; James H. Stone; James A. Sweeney; Martin Leftovith; John J. Tobin; John Bordman Jr; Walter R. Mansfield; George H. Moore; Lawrence M. Stockton; Donald N. MacDonald; Arthur K. Peck; Frank J. Linehan; George A. Donahoe; Edward L. Logan; John H. Giblin, A; Frank S. Atwood; Frank E. Wells; George A. Flynn; William H. Doyle; James Mclnerney; George R. Miller; George O. Wood; Fred A. Emery; Temple A. Winsloe; George W. Lorey; William G. Roemer; John H. Broderick; Guy F. Newhall; Samuel H. Mildram.

=== 1900–1909 ===
- 1900 - Aldermen: Philip O Brien; Patrick Bowen; Michael William Norris; Michael Joseph O Brien; George Holden Tinkham; Robert Anson Jordan; Edwin Peabody Gerry. — Common Council: Herbert W. Burr; William B. Jackson; William C. S. Healey; Daniel J. Sheehan; William J. Carley; George H. Cadigan; Arthur W. Dolan; John C. Hurley; Thomas J. Grady; Daniel L. Flanagan; Osborn A. Newton; Harry S. Upham; Lawrence J. Kelly; John E. L. Monaghan; J. Frank O Hare; William L. White; William McG Grant; James M. Curley; William E. Good; Michael W. Kelley; William O. S. Hennigan; William M. Curtis; Clarence W. Starratt; William H. Nitz; William L. Strickland; Walter E. Henderson; J. Henry Smith; Frederick W. Whiteley; Herbert W. Burr; William E. Hannan; Frank H. Howe.
- 1901 - Aldermen: John Lawrence Kelly; George Robert Miller; Joseph Irving Stewart. — Common Council: Walter J. Staples; Joseph F. Carter; Thomas F. Clark; Edward L. Cauley; Henry M. Wing; Ward A; Philip C. McMahon; John J. Mullen; Frank P. Murphy; Maurice J. Power; Henry S. Fitzgerald; George A. Scigliano; James F. McDermott; John L. Sullivan; Hyman Weinberg; John L. Curry; Edward F. Fitzgerald; Harry Alexander; James F. Phelan; March G. Bennett; Robert Homans; S. William Simms; Frank E. Gaylord; Andrew L. O Toole; Patrick J. Shiels; John J. Teevens Jr; William E. Hickey; James M. Lane; William H. Gavin; Hugh J. Young; William H. Murphy; William J. Barrett; Thomas E. Raftery; John F. Egan; Peter A. Hoban; Bernard W. Kenney; Frank W. Thayer; Edmund Weber; Thomas D. Roberts; George P. Beckford; Edward J. Bromberg; Edward W. Brown; George McKee.
- 1902 - Aldermen: Edward Louis Quigley; Thomas Henry Dowd; Charles Henry Slattery; Frederick Walter Farwell; Timothy Edward McCarthy; William Blackman Heath. — Common Council: Herbert W. Burr; Robert J. Gove; James J. Donnelly; John J. Flaherty; John J. Conway; Daniel J. McDonald; Peter A. McDonald; George A. Murdock; Philip J. McGonagle; William A. H. Crowley; Joseph A. Maynard; Aaron E. Myers; Guy W. Cox; Daniel W. Lane; Everett H. Jenney; Edward F. McGrady; Robert J. Ware; Charles E. Walsh; Arthur L. Gavin; William J. Lyons; Jeremiah J. Good; John F. Hoar; Martin Milmore; David M. Owens; John J. Burke; John Grauman; John J. Conway; Henry S. Clark.
- 1903 - Aldermen: James Francis Nolan; Hugh William Bresnahan; John Joseph Flanagan; Henry Adams Frothingham; Fred Eldridge Bolton; Edward Justin Bromberg. — Common Council: Thomas H. Dalton; Gilbert M. Stalker; John D. Cadogan; John F. Collins; James E. Fitzgerald; Patrick J. Long; Thomas J. McMackin; William J. Foley; David Mancovitz; Robert J. McKirdy; Frank J. Gethro; Edward N. Lacey; George Nicols; Charles W. M. Williams; Fred A. Ewell; Eugene T. Brazzell; William L. Newton; William J. Drummond; Joseph H. Reagan; Thomas B. Bradley; Clement H. Coleman; Charles M. Callahan; John M. McDonald; Theodore A. Glynn; William P. Grady; Thomas J. Fay; William H. Curley; Michael A. Spillane; Tilton S. Bell; Thomas Leavitt; Edwin T. McKnight; John E. Crook; William F. Howes; William H. Jordan; Gideon B. Abbott; Charles Patterson; Joseph B. Brown; Hammond B. Hazelwood; Edward M. Richardson.
- 1904 - Aldermen: John Edward Baldwin, No; James Michael Curley; William John Hennessey; Fred James Kneeland; Daniel Aloysius Whelton. — Common Council: William G. Harrington; Lewis B. McKie; Edward F. Colbert; Joseph F. Crowley; Michael J. Eagan; Thomas F. Fitzgerald; William F. Murray Jr; Max L. Rachkowsky; John W. Craig; Daniel L. Sullivan; J. Bernard Ferber; Philip S. Dalton; Myron E. Pierce; Humphrey J. Collins; Nathan B. McLoud; James J. Moynihan; John J. Driscoll; Timothy J. Sullivan Jr; George F. Coughlin; James J. Conboy; William J. Gleason; Joseph P. Good; James J. Kelley; Charles F. Mackenzie; Sherwin L. Cook; Fred P. Warner; Matthew J. Hanley; Jeremiah J. Hourin; Paul L. Jepson; James A. Price; James Oliver Higgins; Patrick H. Barry; Francis B. McKinney.
- 1905 - Aldermen: Edward Lawrence Cauley; Louis Munroe Clark; Frank J. Linehan. — Common Council: Robert E. Sexton; Ernest W. Woodside; William G. Donovan; Michael H. Fitzgerald; Bernard F. Hanrahan; William E. Magurn; Joseph M. Sullivan; Alfred J. Lill Jr; Jeremiah J. McCarthy; David T. Montague; Malcolm E. Nichols; James B. Noyes; Isaac L. Roberts; William E. Chester; Florence H. Fitzgerald; Leo F. McCullough; Thomas P. McDavitt; Thomas F. Coogan; James J. Hughes; Hugh Mealey Jr; Patrick H. O Connor; John P. Noonan; Thomas M. Joyce; Daniel J. Cuttey Jr; Samuel J. Madden; Timothy F. Murphy; Charles E. Beatty; James J. McCarty; John J. Shea Jr; George W. Carruth; Harry B. Fowler; J. Henry Leonard; William E. Cose; Edward C. Webster.
- 1906 - Aldermen: Francis Reginald Bangs; George H. Battis; Tilton Stuart Bell; Charles Martin Draper. — Common Council: Edward C. R. Bagley; Thomas F. Doherty; Joseph E. Donovan; James E. Ducey; John J. Hayes; John J. McDermott; J. Frank O Brien; Joseph Santosuosso; Bartholomew A. Brickley; Matthew J. Dacey; Jacob Rosenberg; John S. Driscoll; John B. McGregor; Patrick D. McGrath; John Troy; John D. McGivern; William S. Bramhall; Charles A. Clark; Donald J. Ferguson; E. Howard George; Joseph H. Wentworth; William C. Clark; Edward M. Green; William B. Willcutt.

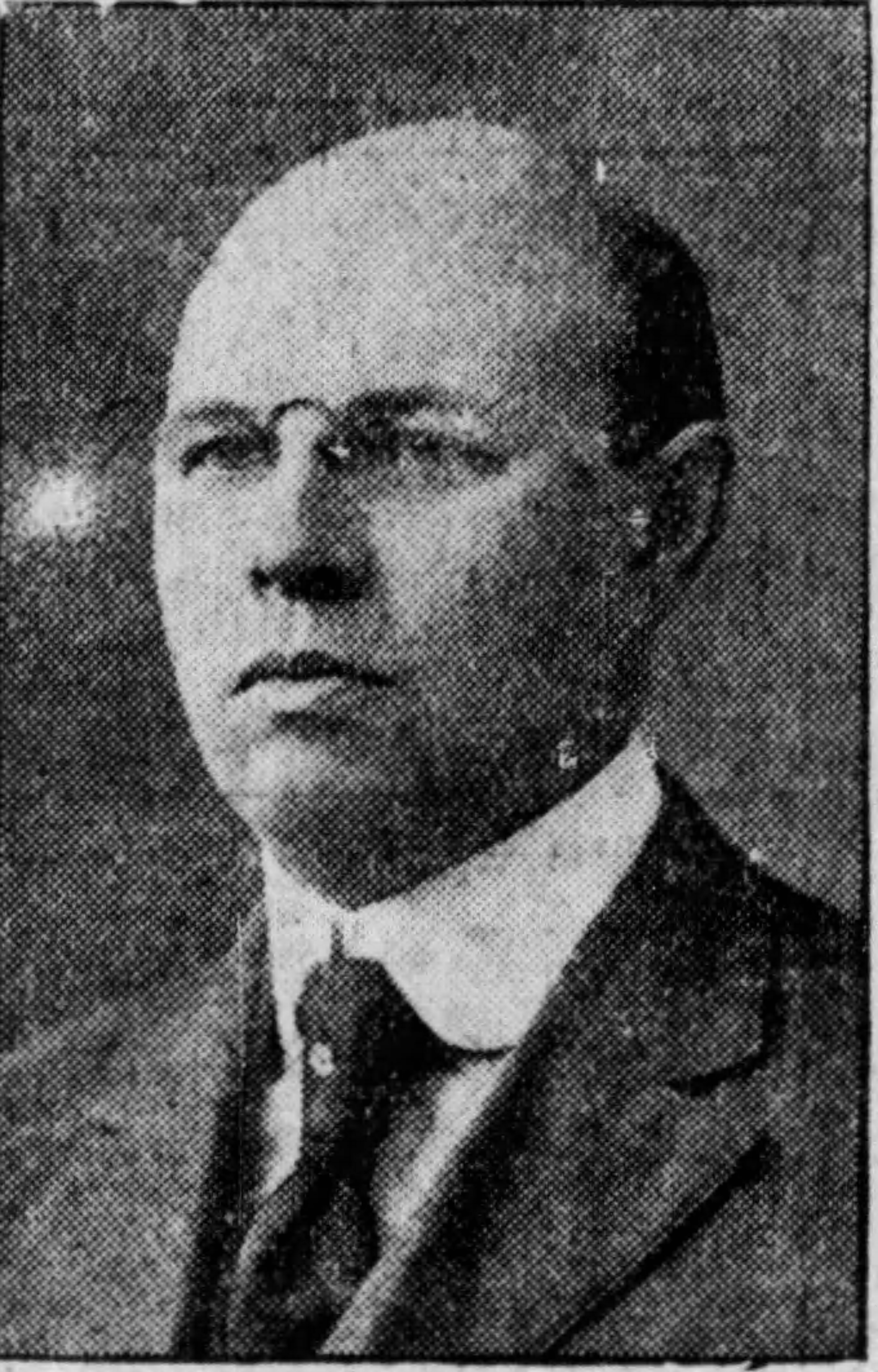
George P. Anderson

- 1907 - Aldermen: Frederick Andrew Finigan; Daniel Lawrence Flanagan, Michael John Leary; William Henry Woods. — Common Council: Theodore L. Sorenson; Joseph H. Pendergast; John J. McCormack; James A. Hatton; John J. Buckley; James T. Purcell; John T. Kennedy; Edward D. Spellman; Joseph Leonard; Solomon Sacks; George P. Anderson; Joseph W. Wharton; George T. Daley; Augustus D. McLennan; James J. Doyle; Edward T. J. Noonan; Cornelius J. Fitzgerald; Thomas F. O Brien; Francis L. Colpoys; John L. Costello; James H. Kelly; Francis L. Daly; Frederick J. J. Sheenan; Daniel F. Cronin; Michael F. O Brien; William J. Kohler; Charles T. Harding; William N. Hackett; William H. Morgan; George Penshorn; George M. Brown; Earl E. Davidson; George C. McCabe; Axel E. Zetterman.
- 1909:

Aldermen

Frederick Brand, chairman
- James M. Curley
- James P. Timilty
- Daniel A. Whelton
- J. Frank O’Hare
- Daniel J. Donnelly†
- John J. Attridge
- George P. Anderson
- Charles L. Carr
- Walter Ballantyne
- Thomas J. Giblin
- Frederick J. Brand
- Matthew Hale
- W. Dudley Cotton, Jr

†Died June 23, 1909

Councilors

George C. McCabe, president

Ward	Councilors
Ward 1	Edward C. R. Bagley; Frank A. Goodwin; Joseph A. Hoey
Ward 2	Joseph H. Pendergast; Dannis A. O’Neil; Michael J. Brophy
Ward 3	James J. Brennan; Joseph A. Dart; William J. Murray
Ward 4	Francis M. Ducey; Patrick B. Carr; James I. Green
Ward 5	John J. Buckley; William E. Carney; Edward A. Troy
Ward 6	Stephen Gardella; Francis D. O’Donnell; Alfred Scigliano
Ward 7	John L. Donovan; John T. Kennedy; Dominick F. Spellman
Ward 8	James J. Ryan; James A. Bragan; Adolphus M. Burroughs

Ward	Councilors
Ward 9	Issac Gordon; Robert J. Howell; Thomas B. McKeagney
Ward 10	J. Henderson Allston; Channing H. Cox; William S. Kinney
Ward 11	Courtenay Crocker; Theodore Hoague; Charles H. Moore
Ward 12	Seth Fenelon Arno; Alfred G. Davis; Francis J. H. Jones
Ward 13	Leo F. McCullough‡; Stephen A. Welch; Coleman E. Kelly
Ward 14	Cornelius J. Fitzgerald; Thomas J. Casey; Joseph L. Collins
Ward 15	John O’Hara; William T. Conway; Joseph A. O’Bryan
Ward 16	John D. McGivern; Hugh M. Garrity; William D. McCarthy

Ward	Councilors
Ward 17	Thomas M. Joyce; Francis J. Brennan; John D. Connors
Ward 18	Daniel F. Cronin; Michael F. O’Brien; George Kenney
Ward 19	Peter A. Hoban; William J. Kohler; John J. Donovan
Ward 20	Charles T. Harding; Harry H. Cumming; William Smith, Jr.
Ward 21	William N. Hackett; John Ballantyne; Walter R. Meins
Ward 22	William H. Morgan; George Penshorn; Bernhard G. Krug
Ward 23	George W. Carruth; George W. Smith; Ward D. Prescott
Ward 24	Frank B. Crane; James A. Hart; Clifford C. Best
Ward 25	Edward C. Webster; George C. McCabe; Charles H. Warren

=== 1910–1919 ===
- 1910: Walter Ballantyne, President; John J. Attridge; James M. Curley; Frederick J. Brand; Matthew Hale; Daniel J. McDonald; Walter L. Collins; Thomas J. Kenny; Timothy J. Buckley.
- 1911: Daniel J. McDonald; John J. Attridge; James M. Curley; Timothy J. Buckley; Matthew Hale; Walter Ballantyne; Ernest E. Smith; Walter L. Collins; Thomas J. Kenny.
- 1912: John J. Attridge, President; Walter Ballantyne; Daniel J. McDonald; Thomas J. Kenny; Timothy J. Buckley; Matthew Hale; John A. Coulthurst; Ernest E. Smith; Walter L. Collins.
- 1913: Thomas J. Kenny, President; John J. Attridge; Walter Ballantyne; Daniel J. McDonald; Walter L. Collins; Timothy J. Buckley; James A. Watson; John A. Coulthurst; Ernest E. Smith.
- 1914: Daniel J. Mcdonald, President; John J. Attridge; Walter Ballantyne; George W. Coleman; Walter L. Collins; Thomas J. Kenny; William H. Woods; James A. Watson; John A. Coulthurst.
- 1915: George E. Coleman, President; Walter Ballantyne; George W. Coleman; John J. Attridge; John A. Coulthurst; Daniel J. McDonald; Walter L. Collins; Henry E. Hagan; William H. Woods; James A. Watson; James J. Storrow.
- 1916: Henry E. Hagan, President; John J. Attridge; Walter Ballantyne; Daniel J. McDonald; Walter L. Collins; John A. Coulthurst; George W. Coleman; James Storrow; Thomas J. Kenny; Geoffrey B. Lehy.
- 1917: James J. Storrow, President; Fran J. W. Ford; John J. Attridge; Walter Ballantyne; Daniel J. McDonald; Walter L. Collins; Henry E. Hagan; James A. Watson; Alfred E. Wellington.
- 1918: Wavier L. Collins, President; Henry E. Hagan; Francis J. W. Ford; John J. Attridge; Daniel W. Lane; Daniel J. McDonald; Walter L. Collins; James T. Moriarty; James A. Watson; James J. Storrow.
- 1919: Francis J. W. Ford, President; Walter L. Collins; Henry E. Hagan; John A. Donoghue; Daniel W. Lane; Daniel J. McDonald; Edward F. McLaughlin; James T. Moriarty; James A. Watson.

=== 1920–1929 ===
- 1920: James T. Moriarty, President; David J. Brickley; Walter L. Collins; Henry E. Hagan; Francis J. W. Ford; John A. Donoghue; Daniel W. Lane; James A. Watson; Edward F. McLaughlin.
- 1921: James W. Watson, President; Henry E. Hagan; David J. Brickley; Walter L. Collins; Daniel W. Lane; Francis J. W. Ford; John A. Donoghue; James T. Moriarty; James A. Watson; Edward F. McLaughlin.
- 1922: David J. Buckley, President; John A. Donoghue; Henry E. Hagan; David J. Brickley; George F. Gilbody; Daniel W. Lane; Francis J. W. Ford; William J. Walsh; James T. Moriarty; James A. Watson.
- 1923: Daniel W. Lane, President; David J. Brickley; John A. Donoghue; Henry E. Hagan; William C.S. Healey; George F. Gilbody; James A. Watson; William J. Walsh; James T. Moriarty.
- 1924: John A. Donoghue, President; Daniel W. Lane; David J. Brickley; James T. Moriarty; William C.S. Healey; George F. Gilbody; James T. Purcell; James A. Watson; William J. Walsh.
- 1925: James T. Moriarty, President; Daniel W. Lane; David J. Brickley; John A. Donoghue; William C.S. Healey; George F. Gilbody; James T. Purcell; James A. Watson; William J. Walsh.

In November 1924, Boston voters approved replacing the 9-person City Council (all elected at-large) with a 22-person City Council (elected by wards). The first such election was held in November 1925, for terms starting in January 1926.

- 1926: Charles G. Keene, President; Timothy F. Donovan; John F. Dowd; Thomas W. Mcmahon; Thomas H. Green; Michael J. Ward; George F. Gilbody; John I. Fitzgerald; Walter J. Freeley; Robert Gardiner Wilson Jr.; Seth F. Arnold; Edward L. Englert; Walter E. Wragg; Michael J. Mahoney; Herman L. Bush; Horace Guild; Henry Parkman Jr.; Joseph McGrath; Frederick E. Dowling; William G. Lynch; Israel Ruby; John J. Heffernan.
- 1927: John J. Heffernan, President; Timothy F. Donovan; John F. Dowd; Thomas W. McMahon; Thomas H. Green; Michael J. Ward; George F. Gilbody; John I. Fitzgerald; Walter J. Freeley; Robert Gardiner Wilson Jr.; Seth F. Arnold; Edward L. Englert; Walter E. Wragg; Michael J. Mahoney; Herman L. Bush; Horace Guild; Henry Parkman Jr.; Joseph McGrath; Charles C. Keene; William G. Lynch; Israel Ruby; Frederic E. Dowling.
- 1928: Thomas H. Green, President; Timothy F. Donovan; Michael J. Ward; Albert L. Fish; John I. Fitzgerald; Roger E. Deveney; Robert Gardiner Wilson Jr.; Seth F. Arnold; William A. Motle Jr. Peter J. Murphy; Henry Parkman Jr.; Herman L. Bush; Peter A. Murray; Michael J. Mahoney; Frank E. Sullivan; Charles G. Keene; William G. Lynch; Israel Ruby; Frederic E. Dowling; John F. Dowd; Thomas W. McMahon; Edward M. Gallagher.
- 1929: Timothy F. Donovan, President; Thomas H. Green; Michael J. Ward; Albert L. Fish; John I. Fitzgerald; Roger E. Deveney; Robert Cardiner Wilson Jr.; Seth F. Arnold; William A. Motley Jr. Peter J. Murphy; Henry Parkman Jr.; Herman L. Bush; Peter A. Murray; Michael J. Mahoney; Frank E. Sullivan; Charles G. Keene; William G. Lynch; Israel Ruby; Frederic E. Dowling; John F. Dowd; Thomas W. McMahon; Edward M. Gallagher.

=== 1930–1939 ===
- 1930: William G. Lynch, President; Timothy F. Donovan; Richard D. Gleason; Albert L. Fish; Thomas H. Green; Leo F. Power; Robert Gardiner Wilson Jr.; John I. Fitzgerald; Edward L. Englert; Clement A. Norton; Seth F. Arnold; Herman L. Bush; Peter A. Murray; Laurence Curtis; Joseph McGrath; Joseph P. Cox; Michael J. Mahoney; Israel Ruby; James Hein; John F. Dowd; Francis E. Kelley; Edward M. Gallagher.
- 1931: Joseph McGrath, President; Timothy F. Donovan; John F. Dowd; Albert L. Fish; Thomas H. Green; Richard D. Gleason; Robert Gardiner Wilson Jr.; John I. Fitzgerald; Leo F. Power; Clement A. Norton; Seth F. Arnold; Edward L. Englert; Peter A. Murray; Laurence Curtis; Herman L. Bush; Joseph P. Cox; Michael J. Mahoney; Israel Ruby; James Hein; William G. Lynch; Francis E. Kelley; Edward M. Gallagher.
- 1932: Edward M. Gallagher, President; William H. Barker; John F. Dowd; Albert L. Fish; Thomas H. Green; Richard D. Gleason; Francis E. Kelley; John I. Fitzgerald; Leo F. Power; Thomas Burke; George W. Roberts; Edward L. Englert; Clement A. Norton; Laurence Curtis; David M. Brackman; Peter A. Murray; George P. Donovan; Joseph McGrath; Joseph P. Cox; William G. Lynch; Israel Ruby; James Hein.
- 1933: Joseph Mcgrath, President; William H. Barker; John F. Dowd; Albert L. Fish; Thomas II Green; Richard D. Gleason; Thomas Burke; John I. Fitzgerald; Leo F. Power; Clement A. Norton; George W. Roberts; Edward L. Englert; Peter A. Murray; Laurence Curtis; David M. Brackman; Joseph P. Cox; George P. Donovan; Israel Ruby; James Hein; William G. Lynch; Francis E. Kelley; Edward M. Gallagher.
- 1934: John A. Dowd, President; Henry Selvitella; Richard D. Gleason; Albert L. Fish; Thomas H. Green; John J. Doherty; Robert Gardiner Wilson Jr.; John I. Fitzgerald; Edward L. Englert; Clement A. Norton; George W. Roberts; David M. Brackman; Peter A. Murray; Henry Lee Shattuck; Joseph McGrath; James F. Finley; George P. Donovan; Maurice M. Goldman; James E. Agnew; John E. Kerrigan; Martin H. Tobin; Edward M. Gallagher.
- 1935: John I. Fitzgerald, President; Henry Selvitella; Richard D. Gleason; Albert L. Fish; Thomas H. Green; John J. Doherty; Robert Cardiner Wilson Jr.; George W. Roberts; Edward L. Englert; Clement A. Norton; Henry L. Shattuck; David M. Brackman; Peter A. Murray; George P. Donovan; Joseph McGrath; James F. Finley; John E. Kerrigan; Maurice M. Goldman; James E. Agnew; John F. Dowd; Martin H. Tobin; Edward M. Gallagher.
- 1936: John I. Fitzgerald, President; Henry Selvitella; Richard D. Gleason; John J. McGrath; James J. Mellen; John J. Doherty; Robert Gardiner Wilson Jr.; George W. Roberts; James J. Kilroy; Clement A. Norton; Henry L. Shattuck; David M. Brackman; Peter J. Murphy; George A. Murray; Peter J. Fitzgerald; James F. Finley; John E. Kerrigan; Sidney Rosenberg; James E. Agnew; John F. Dowd; Martin H. Tobin; Edward M. Gallagher.
- 1937: John I. Fitzgerald, President; Henry Selvitella; Mildred M. Harris; John J. McGrath; James J. Mellen; John J. Doherty; Robert Gardiner Wilson Jr.; George W. Roberts; James J. Kilroy; Clement A. Norton; Henry L. Shattuck; David M. Brackman; Peter A. Murray; George A. Murray; Peter J. Fitzgerald; James F. Finley; John E. Kerrigan; Sidney Rosenberg; James E. Agnew; John F. Dowd; Martin H. Tobin; Edward M. Gallagher.
- 1938: John E. Kerrigan, President; Francis W. Irwin; Mildred M. Harris; Philip Austin Fish; William J. Galvin; William A. Carey; Robert Gardiner Wilson Jr.; John I. Fitzgerald; Edward L. Englert; Clement A. Norton; Perlie Dyar Chase; Charles I. Taylor; Peter A. Murray; Henry L. Shattuck; Edward A. Hutchinson Jr. Theodore F. Lyons; George A. Murray; Sydney Rosenberg; James E. Agnew; John F. Dowd; John B. Kelly; Maurice H. Sullivan.
- 1939: George A. Murray, President; Francis W. Irwin; Mildred M. Harris; Philip Austin Fish; William J. Galvin; William A. Carey; Robert Gardiner Wilson Jr.; John I. Fitzgerald; Edward L. Englert; Clement A. Norton; Perlie Dyar Chase; Charles I. Taylor; James M. Langan; Henry L. Shattuck; Edward A. Hutchinson Jr. Theodore F. Lyons; John E. Kerrigan; Sidney Rosenberg; James E. Agnew; George F. McMahon; John B. Kelly; Maurice H. Sullivan.

=== 1940–1949 ===
- 1940–1941: William J. Galvin, President; James S. Coffey; Daniel F. Sullivan; Philip Austin Fish; Joseph Russo; William A. Carey; John C. Wickes; Perlie Dyar Chase; Edward L. Englert; James J. Goode Jr.; Henry L. Shattuck; Charles I. Taylor; James M. Langan; Joseph M. Scannell; Edward A. Hutchinson Jr. Theodore F. Lyons; Thomas E. Linehan; Joseph J. Gottlieb; Michael J. Ward; William F. Hurley; John B. Kelly; Maurice H. Sullivan.
- 1942: Thomas E. Linehan, President; James S. Coffey; Daniel F. Sullivan; Philip Austin Fish; Michael L. Kinsella; William A. Carey; John C. Wickes; Joseph Russo; Matthew F. Hanley; James J. Goode Jr.; Perlie Dyar Chase; Charles I. Taylor; James M. Langan; A. Frank Foster; Thomas J. Hannon; Theodore F. Lyons; Joseph M. Scannell; Joseph J. Gottlieb; William F. Dwyer; William F. Hurley; John B. Kelly; Maurice H. Sullivan.
- 1943: Thomas J. Hannon, President; James S. Coffey; William F. Hurley; Philip Austin Fish; Michael L. Kinsella; Daniel F. Sullivan; John C. Wickes; Joseph Russo; William A. Carey; James J. Goode Jr.; Perlie Dyar Chase; Matthew F. Hanley; James M. Langan; A. Frank Foster; Charles I. Taylor; Theodore F. Lyons; Joseph M. Scannell; Isadore H. Y. Muchnick; William F. Dwyer; Thomas E. Linehan; John B. Kelly; Maurice H. Sullivan.
- 1944: John E. Kerrigan, President; James S. Coffey; Daniel F. Sullivan; Philip Austin Fish; Michael Leo Kinsella; William A. Carey; William Joseph Keenan; Joseph Russo; Matthew F. Hanley; Michael Paul Feeney; Perlie Dyar Chase; Charles I. Taylor; Thomas L. McCormack; James C. Bayley Jr.; Thomas J. Hannon; Thomas G. J. Shannon; Joseph M. Scannell; Isadore H.Y. Muchnick; William F. Dwyer; William F. Hurley; John B. Kelly; Maurice H. Sullivan.
- 1945: John E. Kerrigan, President; James S. Coffey; Daniel F. Sullivan; Philip Austin Fish; Michael Leo Kinsella; William A. Carey; William Joseph Keenan; Joseph Russo; Matthew F. Hanley; Michael Paul Feeney; Perlie Dyar Chase; Charles I. Taylor; Thomas L. McCormack; James C. Bayley Jr.; Thomas J. Hannon; Thomas G. J. Shannon; Joseph M. Scannell; Isadore H. Y. Muchnick; William F. Dwyer; William F. Hurley; John B. Kelly; Maurice H. Sullivan.
- 1946: John B. Kelly, President; James F. Coffey; William F. Hurley; Philip Austin Fish; Michael Leo Kensella; Daniel F. Sullivan; William Joseph Keenan; Joseph Russo; William A. Carey; Michael H. Cantwell; Perlie Dyar Chase; William A. Moriarty; Thomas L. McCormack; James C. Bayley Jr.; Milton Cook; Walter D. Bryan; Joseph M. Scannell; Thomas J. Hannon; Edmund V. Lane; Thomas E. Linehan; Isadore H. Y. Muchnick; Edward C. Madden.
- 1947: John B. Kelly, President; James S. Coffey; William F. Hurley; Philip Austin Fish; Michael Leo Kinsella; Daniel F. Sullivan; William Joseph Keenan; Joseph Russo; William A. Carey; Michael H. Cantwell; Perlie Dyar Chase; William A. Moriarty; Thomas L. McCormack; James C. Bayley Jr.; Milton Cook; Walter D. Bryan; Joseph M. Scannell; Thomas J. Hannon; Edmund V. Lane; Thomas E. Linehan; Isadore H. Y. Muchnick; Edward C. Madden.
- 1948: Thomas J. Hannon, President; James S. Coffey; William F. Hurley; John J. Beades; Michael Leo Kinsella; Daniel F. Sullivan; William Joseph Keenan; George T. Lanigan; William A. Carey; Michael H. Cantwell; Perlie Dyar Chase; Philip A. Tracy; Thomas L. McCormack; John Yerxa; Milton Cook; Walter D. Bryan; John B. Wenzler; Julius Ansel; Edmund V. Lane; Thomas E. Linehan; Robert J. Ramsey; Vincent J. Shanley.
- 1949: William F. Hurley, President; James S. Coffey; Daniel F. Sullivan; John J. Beades; Michael Leo Kinsella; William A. Carey; William Joseph Keenan; George T. Lanigan; Philip A. Tracy; Michael H. Cantwell; Perlie Dyar Chase; Milton Cook; Thomas L. McCormack; John E. Yerxa; Thomas J. Hannon; Walter D. Bryan; John B. Wenzler; Julius Ansel; Edmund Lane; Thomas E. Linehan; Robert J. Ramsey; Vincent J. Shanley.

=== 1950–1959 ===
- 1950: William F. Hurley, President; James S. Coffey; Daniel F. Sullivan; John J. Beades; Michael Leo Kinsella; Francis P. Tracey; Anthony J. Farin; George T. Lanigan; Philip A. Tracy; Michael H. Cantwell; Perlie Dyar Chase; Milton Cook; Thomas L. McCormack; John E. Yerxa; Thomas J. Hannon; Walter D. Bryan; John B. Wenzler; Julius Ansel; Edmund Lane; Thomas E. Linehan^{1}; Robert J. Ramsey; Vincent J. Shanley; John J. McColgan^{1}.
- 1951: William F. Hurley, President; James S. Coffey; Laurence H. Banks; John J. Beades; Michael Leo Kinsella; Francis P. Tracey; Anthony J. Farin; George T. Lanigan; Philip A. Tracy; Michael H. Cantwell; Perlie Dyar Chase; Milton Cook; Thomas L. McCormack; John E. Yerxa; Thomas J. Hannon; Walter D. Bryan; John B. Wenzler; Julius Ansel; Edmund Lane; John J. McColgan; Robert J. Ramsey; Vincent J. Shanley; Daniel F. Sullivan.

In November 1949, Boston voters approved changes to municipal elections, including replacing the 22-person City Council (elected by wards) with a 9-person City Council (all elected at-large). The first such election was held in November 1951, for terms starting in January 1952.

- 1952: Gabriel F. Piemonte, President; Francis X. Ahearn; William F. Hurley; William J. Foley Jr.; Francis X. Joyce; Michael J. Ward; Frederick C. Hailer Jr.; John E. Kerrigan; Joseph C. White.
- 1953: Francis X. Ahearn, President; William F. Hurley; Gabriel F. Piemonte; Francis X. Joyce; Michael J. Ward^{2}; Michael H. Cantwell^{2}; William J. Foley Jr.; John E. Kerrigan; Joseph C. White; Frederick C. Hailer Jr.
- 1954: Joseph C. White, President; Francis X. Ahearn; William F. Hurley; Edward F. McLaughlin Jr.; William J. Foley Jr.; John E. Kerrigan; Gabriel F. Piemonte; Frederick C. Hailer Jr.; Edward J. McCormack Jr.
- 1955: William F. Hurley, President; Francis X. Ahearn; Edward F. McLaughlin Jr.; William J. Foley Jr.; John E. Kerrigan; Gabriel F. Piemonte; Frederick C. Hailer Jr.; Edward J. McCormack Jr. Joseph C. White.
- 1956: Edward J. McCormack Jr., President; Francis X. Ahearn; John E. Kerrigan; Edward F. McLaughlin Jr.; John F. Collins; Gabriel F. Piemonte; William J. Foley Jr.; Patrick F. McDonough; Joseph C. White.
- 1957: William J. Foley Jr., President; Francis X. Ahearn; John E. Kerrigan; Edward F. McLaughlin Jr.; John F. Collins^{3}; Edward J. McCormack Jr.; Gabriel F. Piemonte; Patrick F. McDonough; Joseph C. White; Frederick C. Hailer Jr.^{3}
- 1958: Patrick F. McDonough, President; Christopher A. Iannella; Edward F. McLaughlin Jr.^{5}; William J. Foley Jr.; John E. Kerrigan; Gabriel F. Piemonte; Frederick C. Hailer Jr.^{4}; Edward J. McCormack Jr.; Joseph C. White; Peter F. Hines^{5}; James S. Coffey^{4}.
- 1959: Edward F. McLaughlin Jr., President; James S. Coffey; Christopher A. Iannella; William J. Foley Jr.; John E. Kerrigan; Gabriel F. Piemonte; Peter F. Hines; Patrick F. McDonough; Joseph C. White.
- 1. In September 1950, John J. McColgan won a special election to succeed Thomas E. Linehan as Ward 7's council representative after Linehan was appointed as a special justice of the South Boston Municipal Court.
- 2. In December 1953, Michael H. Cantwell served the final week of Michael J. Ward's term, when the latter retired.
- 3. In February 1957, John F. Collins was appointed Suffolk County register of probate. He was replaced on the City Council by Frederick C. Hailer Jr.
- 4. On April 21, 1958, Frederick C. Hailer Jr. resigned from the City Council. He was succeeded by James S. Coffey.
- 5. Following Edward F. McLaughlin Jr.'s election as Massachusetts Attorney General, he was replaced on the City Council by Peter F. Hines in September 1958.

=== 1960–1969 ===
- 1960: Edward F. McLaughlin Jr., President; James S. Coffey; Peter F. Hines; Patrick F. McDonough; John Patrick Connolly; Christopher A. Iannella; William J. Foley Jr.; John E. Kerrigan; Joseph C. White.
- 1961: Patrick F. McDonough, President; James S. Coffey; Peter F. Hines; John Patrick Connolly; Christopher A. Iannella; Edward F. McLaughlin Jr.†; William J. Foley Jr.; John E. Kerrigan; Joseph C. White‡; Thomas A. Sullivan†; Frederick C. Langone‡
- 1962: Christopher A. Iannella, President; James S. Coffey; Gabriel F. Piemonte; William J. Foley Jr.; John E. Kerrigan; Thomas A. Sullivan; Peter F. Hines; Patrick F. McDonough; John J. Tierney Jr.
- 1963: Peter F. Hines, President; James S. Coffey; Christopher A. Iannella; Gabriel F. Piemonte; William J. Foley Jr.; John E. Kerrigan; Thomas A. Sullivan; Patrick F. McDonough; John J. Tierney Jr.
- 1964: John J. Tierney, President; Katherine Craven; Peter F. Hines; John E. Kerrigan; George F. Foley Jr.; Barry T. Hynes; Frederick C. Langone; William J. Foley Jr.; Christopher A. Iannella.
- 1965: John J. Tierney, President; Katherine Craven; Peter F. Hines; John E. Kerrigan; George F. Foley Jr.; Barry T. Hynes; Frederick C. Langone; William J. Foley Jr.; Christopher A. Iannella.
- 1966: Frederick C. Langone, President; Katherine Craven; Barry T. Hynes; William J. Foley Jr.; Christopher A. Iannella; Patrick F. McDonough; Peter F. Hines; John E. Kerrigan; Gabriel F. Piemonte.
- 1967: Barry T. Hynes, President; Katherine Craven; Frederick C. Langone; William J. Foley Jr.; Christopher A. Iannella; Patrick F. McDonough; Peter F. Hines; John E. Kerrigan; Gabriel F. Piemonte.
- 1968: William J. Foley Jr., President; Thomas I. Atkins; John E. Kerrigan; Gerald F. O'Leary Jr.; Garrett M. Byrne; Frederick C. Langone; John L. Saltonstall Jr.; Patrick F. McDonough; Joseph F. Timilty.
- 1969: Gerald F. O'Leary Jr., President; Thomas I. Atkins; John E. Kerrigan; Garret M. Byrne; Frederick C. Langone; John L. Saltonstall Jr.; William J. Foley Jr.; Patrick F. McDonough; Joseph F. Timilty.
- † Following Edward F. McLaughlin Jr.'s election as Lieutenant Governor of Massachusetts, he was replaced on the City Council by Thomas A. Sullivan in January 1961.
- ‡ In 1961, White resigned from the City Council due to ill health. He was succeeded by Frederick C. Langone on May 1, 1961.

=== 1970–1979 ===
- 1970: Gabriel F. Piemonte, President; Thomas I. Atkins; John E. Kerrigan; Louise Day Hicks; Frederick C. Langone; John L. Saltonstall Jr.; Christopher A. Iannella; Gerald F. O'Leary Jr.; Joseph F. Timilty.
- 1971: Gabriel F. Piemonte, President; Thomas I. Atkins; John E. Kerrigan; Louise Day Hicks^{6}; Frederick C. Langone; John L. Saltonstall Jr.; Christopher A. Iannella; Gerald F. O'Leary Jr.; Joseph F. Timilty; Albert Leo "Dapper" O'Neil^{5}.
- 1972: Gabriel F. Piemonte, President; Lawrence DiCara; Patrick F. McDonough; Albert Leo O'Neil; Christopher A. Iannella; John Joseph Moakley; John E. Kerrigan; Gerald F. O'Leary Jr.; Joseph M. Tierney.
- 1973: Patrick F. McDonough, President; Lawrence S. DiCara; Albert Leo O'Neil; Christopher A. Iannella; Gabriel F. Piemonte; John E. Kerrigan; John Joseph Moakley^{6}; Joseph M. Tierney; Gerald F. O'Leary Jr.; Frederick C. Langone^{6}
- 1974–1975: Gerald F. O'Leary Jr., President; James Michael Connolly; Christopher A. Iannella; Lawrence S. DiCara; Frederick C. Langone; Albert Leo O'Neil; Louise Day Hicks; Patrick F. McDonough; Joseph M. Tierney.
- 1976: Louise Day Hicks, President; James Michael Connolly; Christopher A. Iannella; Patrick F. McDonough; Lawrence S. DiCara; John J. Kerrigan; Albert Leo O'Neil; Frederick C. Langone; Joseph M. Tierney.
- 1977: Joseph M. Tierney, President; James Michael Connolly; Christopher A. Iannella; Patrick F. McDonough; Lawrence S. DiCara; John J. Kerrigan; Albert Leo O'Neil; Louise Day Hicks; Frederick C. Langone.
- 1978: Lawrence DiCara, President; James Michael Connolly; Christopher A. Iannella; Albert Leo O'Neil; Frederick C. Langone; Rosemarie E. Sansone; Raymond Flynn; Patrick F. McDonough; Joseph M. Tierney.
- 1979: Joseph M. Tierney, President; James Michael Connolly^{7}; Albert Leo O'Neil; Lawrence S. DiCara; Christopher A. Iannella; Rosemarie E. Sansone; Raymond L. Flynn; Frederick C. Langon; Patrick F. McDonough; Louise Day Hicks^{7}
- 5. Following Louise Day Hicks's election to the United States House of Representatives, she was replaced on the City Council by Dapper O'Neil in January 1971.
- 6. Following John Joseph Moakley's election to the United States House of Representatives, he was replaced on the City Council by Frederick C. Langone in January 1973.
- 7. Following James Michael Connolly's election as Suffolk County register of probate, he was replaced on the City Council by Louise Day Hicks in January 1979.

=== 1980–1989 ===
- 1980: Christopher A. Iannella, President; Lawrence S. DiCara; Frederick C. Langone; Rosemarie E. Sansone; Raymond L. Flynn; Patrick F. McDonough; John W. Sears; Albert Leo "Dapper" O'Neil; Joseph M. Tierney.
- 1981: Patrick F. McDonough, President; Lawrence S. DiCara; Frederick C. Langone; Rosemarie E. Sansone; Raymond L. Flynn; John W. Sears; Christopher A. Iannella; Albert Leo O'Neil; Joseph M. Tierney.
- 1982: Christopher A. Iannella, President; Bruce C. Bolling; Terence P. McDermott; Raymond L. Flynn; Frederick C. Langone; Albert Leo O'Neil; Maura A. Hennigan; Michael J. McCormack; Joseph M. Tierney.
- 1983: Joseph M. Tierney, President; Bruce C. Bolling; Christopher A. Iannella; Terence P. McDermott; Raymond L. Flynn; Frederick C. Langone; Albert Leo O'Neil; Maura A. Hennigan; Michael J. McCormack.

Starting with the November 1983 election (for terms starting in January 1984) the City Council consists of four at-large members and nine district representatives.

Year	At-large				Districts								
Year	At-large				1	2	3	4	5	6	7	8	9
1984–1985	Christopher A. Iannella	Michael J. McCormack	Albert Leo "Dapper" O'Neil	Joseph M. Tierney	Robert Travaglini	James M. Kelly	James E. Byrne	Charles Yancey	Thomas Menino	Maura Hennigan	Bruce Bolling	David Scondras	Brian J. McLaughlin
1986–1987	Christopher A. Iannella	Michael J. McCormack	Albert Leo O'Neil	Joseph M. Tierney	Robert Travaglini	James M. Kelly	James E. Byrne	Charles Yancey	Thomas Menino	Maura Hennigan	Bruce Bolling	David Scondras	Brian J. McLaughlin
1988–1989	Christopher A. Iannella	Michael J. McCormack	Albert Leo O'Neil	Rosaria Salerno	Robert Travaglini	James M. Kelly	James E. Byrne	Charles Yancey	Thomas Menino	Maura Hennigan	Bruce Bolling	David Scondras	Brian J. McLaughlin

=== 1990–1999 ===
Year	At-large				Districts								
Year	At-large				1	2	3	4	5	6	7	8	9
1990–1991	Christopher A. Iannella	Michael J. McCormack	Albert Leo O'Neil	Rosaria Salerno	Robert Travaglini	James M. Kelly	James E. Byrne	Charles Yancey	Thomas Menino	Maura Hennigan	Bruce Bolling	David Scondras	Brian J. McLaughlin
1992–1993	Christopher A. Iannella†	John A. Nucci	Albert Leo O'Neil	Rosaria Salerno	Robert Travaglini	James M. Kelly	James E. Byrne	Charles Yancey	Thomas Menino	Maura Hennigan	Anthony Crayton	David Scondras	Brian J. McLaughlin
1992–1993	Bruce Bolling	John A. Nucci	Albert Leo O'Neil	Rosaria Salerno	Robert Travaglini	James M. Kelly	James E. Byrne	Charles Yancey	Thomas Menino	Maura Hennigan	Anthony Crayton	David Scondras	Brian J. McLaughlin
1994–1995	Richard P. Iannella	John A. Nucci	Albert Leo O'Neil	Peggy Davis-Mullen	Diane J. Modica	James M. Kelly	Maureen Feeney	Charles Yancey	Daniel F. Conley	Maura Hennigan	Gareth R. Saunders	Thomas M. Keane Jr.	Brian J. McLaughlin
1996–1997	Richard P. Iannella‡	Francis Roache	Albert Leo O'Neil	Peggy Davis-Mullen	Diane J. Modica	James M. Kelly	Maureen Feeney	Charles Yancey	Daniel F. Conley	Maura Hennigan	Gareth R. Saunders	Thomas M. Keane Jr.	Brian Honan
1996–1997	Stephen J. Murphy	Francis Roache	Albert Leo O'Neil	Peggy Davis-Mullen	Diane J. Modica	James M. Kelly	Maureen Feeney	Charles Yancey	Daniel F. Conley	Maura Hennigan	Gareth R. Saunders	Thomas M. Keane Jr.	Brian Honan
1998–1999	Stephen J. Murphy	Francis Roache	Albert Leo O'Neil	Peggy Davis-Mullen	Paul Scapicchio	James M. Kelly	Maureen Feeney	Charles Yancey	Daniel F. Conley	Maura Hennigan	Gareth R. Saunders	Thomas M. Keane Jr.	Brian Honan

† Following the death of Christopher A. Iannella in September 1992; Albert Leo "Dapper" O'Neil was selected as president, while Bruce Bolling served the remainder of Iannella's term, as Bolling had finished fifth in the general election for four at-large seats.
‡ Following the resignation of Richard P. Iannella, who had been elected Register of Probate of Suffolk County, Stephen J. Murphy joined the council in February 1997 and served the balance of Iannella's term, as Murphy had finished fifth in the general election for four at-large seats.

=== 2000–2009 ===
Year	At-large				Districts								
Year	At-large				1	2	3	4	5	6	7	8	9
2000–2001	Peggy Davis-Mullen	Michael F. Flaherty	Stephen J. Murphy	Francis Roache	Paul Scapicchio	James M. Kelly	Maureen Feeney	Charles Yancey	Daniel F. Conley	Maura Hennigan	Chuck Turner	Michael P. Ross	Brian Honan
2000–2001	Peggy Davis-Mullen	Michael F. Flaherty	Stephen J. Murphy	Francis Roache	Paul Scapicchio	James M. Kelly	Maureen Feeney	Charles Yancey	Daniel F. Conley	Maura Hennigan	Chuck Turner	Michael P. Ross	Brian Honan
2002–2003	Maura Hennigan	Michael F. Flaherty	Stephen J. Murphy	Francis Roache†	Paul Scapicchio	James M. Kelly	Maureen Feeney	Charles Yancey	Robert Consalvo	John M. Tobin Jr.	Chuck Turner	Michael P. Ross	Brian Honan†
2002–2003	Maura Hennigan	Michael F. Flaherty	Stephen J. Murphy	Felix D. Arroyo	Paul Scapicchio	James M. Kelly	Maureen Feeney	Charles Yancey	Robert Consalvo	John M. Tobin Jr.	Chuck Turner	Michael P. Ross	Jerry P. McDermott
2004–2005	Maura Hennigan	Michael F. Flaherty	Stephen J. Murphy	Felix D. Arroyo	Paul Scapicchio	James M. Kelly	Maureen Feeney	Charles Yancey	Robert Consalvo	John M. Tobin Jr.	Chuck Turner	Michael P. Ross	Jerry P. McDermott
2006–2007	Sam Yoon	Michael F. Flaherty	Stephen J. Murphy	Felix D. Arroyo	Salvatore LaMattina	James M. Kelly†	Maureen Feeney	Charles Yancey	Robert Consalvo	John M. Tobin Jr.	Chuck Turner	Michael P. Ross	Jerry P. McDermott
2006–2007	Sam Yoon	Michael F. Flaherty	Stephen J. Murphy	Felix D. Arroyo	Salvatore LaMattina	Bill Linehan	Maureen Feeney	Charles Yancey	Robert Consalvo	John M. Tobin Jr.	Chuck Turner	Michael P. Ross	Jerry P. McDermott
2008–2009	Sam Yoon	Michael F. Flaherty	Stephen J. Murphy	John R. Connolly	Salvatore LaMattina	Bill Linehan	Maureen Feeney	Charles Yancey	Robert Consalvo	John M. Tobin Jr.	Chuck Turner	Michael P. Ross	Mark Ciommo
2008–2009	Sam Yoon	Michael F. Flaherty	Stephen J. Murphy	John R. Connolly	Salvatore LaMattina	Bill Linehan	Maureen Feeney	Charles Yancey	Robert Consalvo	John M. Tobin Jr.	Chuck Turner	Michael P. Ross	Mark Ciommo

† Francis Roache, Brian Honan, and James M. Kelley did not complete their terms and were replaced by Felix D. Arroyo, Jerry P. McDermott, and Bill Linehan, respectively.

=== 2010–2019 ===
Year	At-large				Districts								
Year	At-large				1	2	3	4	5	6	7	8	9
2010–2011	Felix G. Arroyo	John R. Connolly	Stephen J. Murphy	Ayanna Pressley	Salvatore LaMattina	Bill Linehan	Maureen Feeney	Charles Yancey	Robert Consalvo	John M. Tobin Jr.†	Chuck Turner†	Michael P. Ross	Mark Ciommo
2010–2011	Felix G. Arroyo	John R. Connolly	Stephen J. Murphy	Ayanna Pressley	Salvatore LaMattina	Bill Linehan	Maureen Feeney	Charles Yancey	Robert Consalvo	Matt O'Malley	Tito Jackson	Michael P. Ross	Mark Ciommo
2012–2013	Felix G. Arroyo	John R. Connolly	Stephen J. Murphy	Ayanna Pressley	Salvatore LaMattina	Bill Linehan	Frank Baker	Charles Yancey	Robert Consalvo	Matt O'Malley	Tito Jackson	Michael P. Ross	Mark Ciommo
2014–2015	Michael F. Flaherty	Michelle Wu	Stephen J. Murphy	Ayanna Pressley	Salvatore LaMattina	Bill Linehan	Frank Baker	Charles Yancey	Timothy McCarthy	Matt O'Malley	Tito Jackson	Josh Zakim	Mark Ciommo
2016–2017	Michael F. Flaherty	Michelle Wu	Annissa Essaibi George	Ayanna Pressley	Salvatore LaMattina	Bill Linehan	Frank Baker	Andrea Campbell	Timothy McCarthy	Matt O'Malley	Tito Jackson	Josh Zakim	Mark Ciommo
2018–2019	Michael F. Flaherty	Michelle Wu	Annissa Essaibi George	Ayanna Pressley	Lydia Edwards	Edward M. Flynn	Frank Baker	Andrea Campbell	Timothy McCarthy	Matt O'Malley	Kim Janey	Josh Zakim	Mark Ciommo
2018–2019	Michael F. Flaherty	Michelle Wu	Annissa Essaibi George	Althea Garrison‡	Lydia Edwards	Edward M. Flynn	Frank Baker	Andrea Campbell	Timothy McCarthy	Matt O'Malley	Kim Janey	Josh Zakim	Mark Ciommo

† Both John M. Tobin Jr. and Chuck Turner did not complete their terms and were replaced by Matt O'Malley and Tito Jackson, respectively, through special elections.
‡ Following Ayanna Pressley's election to the United States House of Representatives, she was replaced on the City Council by Althea Garrison in January 2019.

=== 2020–2029 ===
Year	At-large				Districts								
Year	At-large				1	2	3	4	5	6	7	8	9
2020–2021	Michael F. Flaherty	Michelle Wu	Annissa Essaibi George	Julia Mejia	Lydia Edwards	Edward M. Flynn	Frank Baker	Andrea Campbell	Ricardo Arroyo	Matt O'Malley*	Kim Janey*	Kenzie Bok	Liz Breadon
2022–2023	Michael F. Flaherty	Ruthzee Louijeune	Erin Murphy	Julia Mejia	Lydia Edwards †	Edward M. Flynn	Frank Baker	Brian Worrell	Ricardo Arroyo	Kendra Lara	Tania Fernandes Anderson	Kenzie Bok‡	Liz Breadon
2022–2023	Michael F. Flaherty	Ruthzee Louijeune	Erin Murphy	Julia Mejia	Gabriela Coletta	Edward M. Flynn	Frank Baker	Brian Worrell	Ricardo Arroyo	Kendra Lara	Tania Fernandes Anderson	Sharon Durkan	Liz Breadon
2024–2025	Henry Santana	Ruthzee Louijeune	Erin Murphy	Julia Mejia	Gabriela Coletta	Edward M. Flynn	John FitzGerald	Brian Worrell	Enrique Pepén	Benjamin Weber	Tania Fernandes Anderson	Sharon Durkan	Liz Breadon
2026–2027	Henry Santana	Ruthzee Louijeune	Erin Murphy	Julia Mejia	Gabriella Coletta-Zapata	Edward M. Flynn	John FitzGerald	Brian Worrell	Enrique Pepén	Benjamin Weber	Miniard Culpepper	Sharon Durkan	Liz Breadon

* Following Mayor Marty Walsh's appointment as United States Secretary of Labor, Kim Janey became Acting Mayor and Matt O'Malley presided over the City Council.
† Following Lydia Edwards' election to the Massachusetts State Senate, Gabriela Coletta won the May 3, 2022, special election for the District 1 seat.
‡ Kenzie Bok resigned her seat effective April 28, 2023, in order to join the Boston Housing Authority—a special election to fill the District 8 seat was won by Sharon Durkan on July 25, 2023.

== See also ==
- Boston Board of Selectmen, 1630s–1822
- Boston City Hall, seat of municipal government 1969–present
- Old City Hall (Boston), seat of municipal government 1865–1969
- Suffolk County Courthouse, seat of municipal government c. 1841–1865
- Old State House (Boston, Massachusetts), seat of municipal government c. 1830–1841
