= Henry Rice (politician) =

American politician

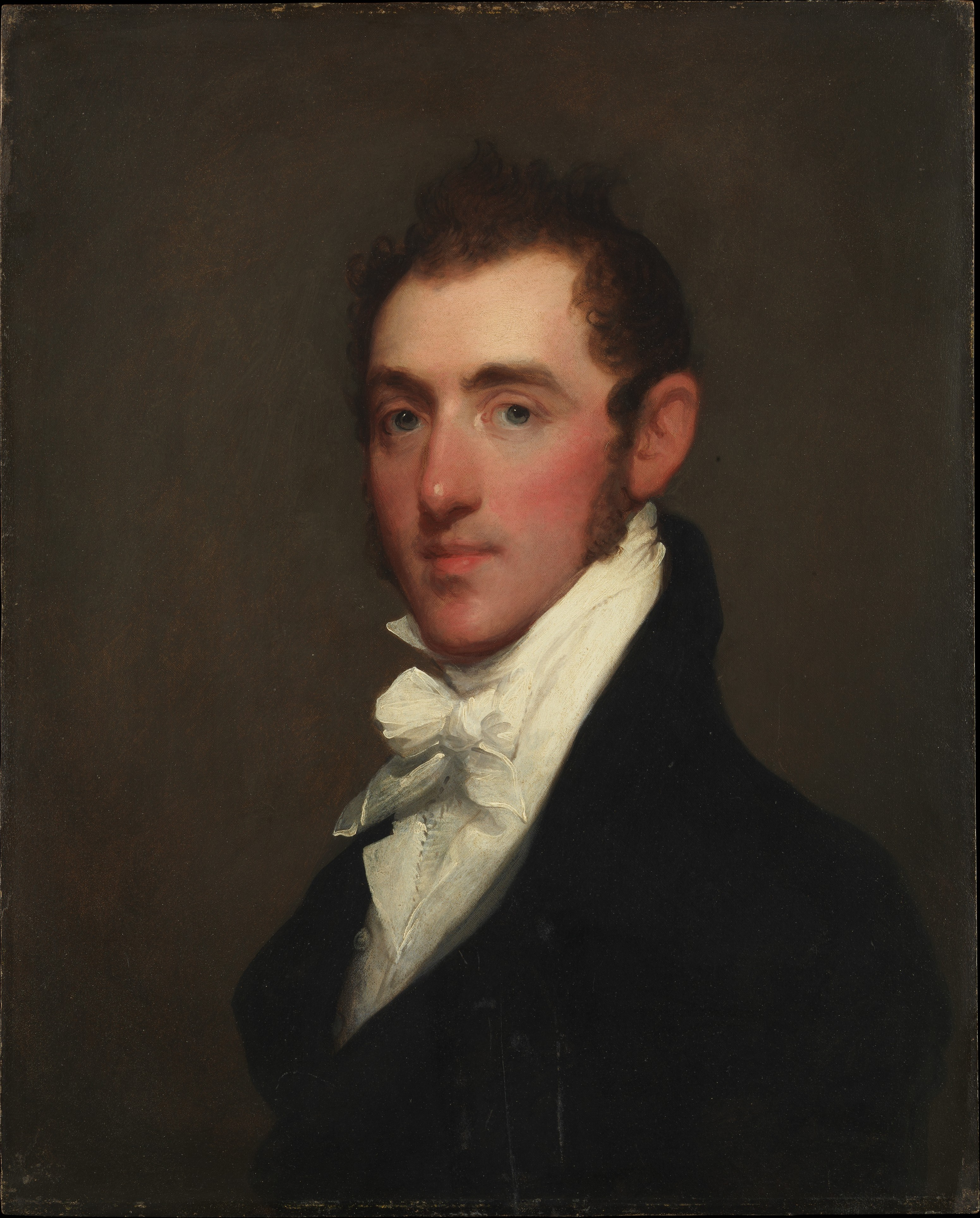
- Major Henry Rice ca1815 Portrait by Gilbert Stuart

Member of the Massachusetts House of Representatives from the Boston, Suffolk district

Personal details
- Born: January 15, 1786 Marlborough, Massachusetts
- Died: October 15, 1867 (aged 81) Boston, Massachusetts
- Spouse: Maria Burroughs (m. 1816)
- Children: Anna Maria (Rice) Coolidge (b. 1817); Henry Rice (1818-1851); Louisa (Rice) Weed (b. 1820); George E. Rice (b. 1822); William T. Rice (b. 1828); Mary H.P. Rice (b. 1833)
- Profession: merchant, state legislator

Military service
- Branch/service: United States Army
- Years of service: 1812 – 1815
- Rank: Major
- Battles/wars: War of 1812

Henry Rice (January 15, 1786 – October 15, 1867) was an American Army officer in the War of 1812, a leading Boston merchant, a member of the Boston City Council and a member of the Massachusetts House of Representatives.

== Biography ==
Henry Rice was born in Marlborough, Massachusetts on 15 January 1786 to Noah Rice and Hannah Palfrey (Cole) Rice. He served as an officer in the War of 1812, attaining the rank of major. He married Maria Burroughs of Boston on 26 February 1816, and they had five children. Rice served as a member of the City of Boston Common Council from 1832 to 1834, and in 1838, and served for six years as a member of the Massachusetts House of Representatives. He was a trader of imported goods in Boston and lived at 8 Bulfinch Street in Boston's Beacon Hill district, but he maintained a substantial estate in Marlborough that he inherited from his father Noah. In his later years, after 1847, he was engaged in the trading of corporate stocks in Boston. Rice died on 15 October 1867 at his home in Boston.

== Family relations and legacy ==
Rice's grandson Charles Austin Coolidge was a brigadier general in the U.S. Army. Upon Rice's death, his estate near the center of Marlborough 42.34765°N 71.54924°W was sold to build housing for workers in the shoe factories that were being established in the rapidly industrializing town. Rice Street in the Middle Village area near downtown Marlborough was named after Henry at that time.

Rice was a direct descendant of Edmund Rice an early immigrant to Massachusetts Bay Colony as follows:

- Henry Rice, son of

- Noah Rice (1751–1820), son of

- Jabez Rice (1702–1783), son of

- Caleb Rice (1666–1739), son of

- Joseph Rice (1637–1711), son of

- Edmund Rice, (ca. 1594–1663)
