= Ebenezer Bailey =

American educator

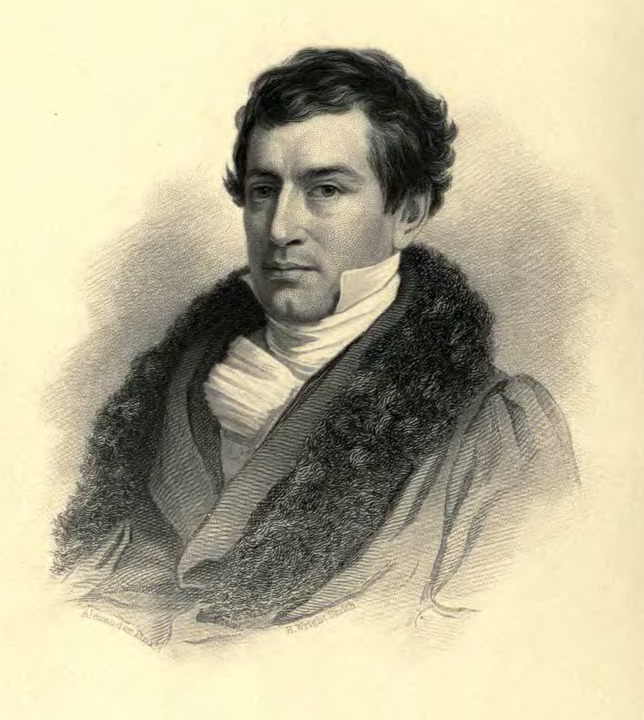
- Born: June 25, 1795; West Newbury
- Died: August 5, 1839 (aged 44); Lynn
- Occupation: Educator

Ebenezer Bailey (June 25, 1795 – August 5, 1839) was an American educator.

== Biography ==
Ebenezer Bailey was born on June 25, 1795 in West Newbury, Massachusetts. He graduated from Yale College in 1817, after which he taught school, and also entered his name as a law student. Afterward he became a tutor in Virginia, but in 1819 returned to Newburyport, and there opened a private school for young ladies. In 1823 he was appointed master of the Franklin Grammar School for Boys, and in 1825 teacher of the High School for Girls of Boston for girls. This school proved unsuccessful, and Josiah Quincy, then mayor, pronounced it an entire failure. Bailey at once replied with vigor in a Review of the Mayor's Report upon the High School for Girls (Boston, 1828). Subsequently, he had charge of the Young Ladies High School in Boston, and in 1830 was active in the establishment of the American Institute of Instruction, afterward filling various offices in that body. In 1838 he established a boys' school at Roxbury, which, in 1839, was moved to Lynn. Bailey was the successful competitor for the prize ode delivered at the Boston theatre in commemoration of George Washington's death. Afterward he was on several occasions poet at the Phi Beta Kappa anniversaries of Yale. Bailey was at various times a member of the city council of Boston, director of the Home of Reform, president of the Boston Lyceum, and director of the Boston Mechanics Institute. He was a frequent contributor to the Boston Courier and other periodicals, and edited The Young Ladies' Class-Book (Boston, 1831); Blakewell's Philosophical Conversations (1832); and First Lessons on Algebra (1833).

Ebenezer Bailey died on 5 August 1839 in Lynn.
