= Joshua Barker Flint =

American physician

Joshua Barker Flint (October 13, 1801, Cohasset, Massachusetts – March 19, 1864, Louisville, Kentucky) was an American medical doctor, Massachusetts state legislator, and professor of surgery, noteworthy as one of the pioneers of the use of ether as an anesthetic.

== Early life ==
Joshua B. Flint was the son of Rev. Jacob Flint and Sylvia Baker. He graduated from Harvard College with A.B. in 1820. He then taught for two years at Boston's English Classical School before matriculating at Harvard Medical School, where he received his M.D. degree in 1825.

== Career ==
From 1825 to 1837 he practiced medicine in Boston.

He was elected to the Massachusetts State Legislature several times. Before the Presidency of Martin Van Buren, Flint was a member of the Whig Party but, upon Van Buren's election in 1837, became a member of the Democratic Party and continued in that Party. He was a strong supporter of the Union side during the 1860s.

From May 1831 to May 1832 he was one of the curators for the Boston Society of Natural History. From 1832 to 1835 he was one of the editors, along with Abel Lawrence Peirson, Elisha Bartlett, and Augustus Addison Gould, for The Medical Magazine.

Upon the invitation of Dr. Charles Caldwell, Flint accepted the professorial chair of surgery in the Louisville Medical Institute (which was established in 1837). From 1837 to 1840 he held that professorial chair, but then resigned to devote himself to medical practice. He spent most of the year 1838 visiting various medical establishments in Europe, where he also purchased books for the Louisville Medical Institute Library.

In the winter and spring of 1847 he administered ether for the first time in Kentucky and perhaps in the West. It was for an amputation of the lower limb, the ether being then called "letheon" and administered by the aid of a complicated apparatus. About this same time Samuel D. Gross administered chloroform for the first time in Kentucky.

In 1846 the Louisville Medical Institute became the Medical Department of the University of Louisville; Flint was appointed Professor of the Principles and Practice of Surgery in 1849, retaining that professorship until he died in 1864.

== Personal life ==
In April 1841, Flint married Nannie W. Trimble, the youngest daughter of Robert Trimble. There were no children from the marriage.

== Selected publications ==
- An address delivered before the Massachusetts Society for the suppression of intemperance, May 29, 1828.
- An Address delivered to the students of the Louisville Medical Institute: in the presence of the citizens of the place, at the commencement of the second session of the Institute, November 13th, 1838.
