= Israel Ruby =

American Attorney & Politician

Presiding Justice of the Williamstown District Court
- In office 1938–1952
- Preceded by: Clarence Murray Smith
- Succeeded by: Samuel E. Levine

Member of the Boston City Council for Ward 14
- In office 1929–1931
- Preceded by: Position created
- Succeeded by: Maurice M. Goldman

Personal details
- Died: September 7, 1983 (aged 95) Springfield, Massachusetts
- Party: Republican

Israel Ruby was an American attorney and politician who served on the Boston City Council from 1926 to 1934 and was a Judge of the Williamstown District Court from 1937 to 1952.

== Early life ==
Ruby attended Boston public schools, The English High School, and Northeastern University. He was admitted to the Massachusetts bar in 1913. During World War I, Ruby was denied enlistment to the United States Army and Navy and instead was active in the Liberty bond program and the American Red Cross. He was also a longtime basketball and football referee and served as secretary-treasurer of the New England Basketball Officials' Association. A Zionist, Ruby raised funds for the reconstruction of Jewish settlements destroyed in the 1929 Palestine riots.

== Politics ==
In 1925, the first year the Boston City Council switched from at-large to district representation, Ruby was elected to represent Ward 14. In 1933, Ruby, then the most senior member of the council not to have served as president, ran for council president. The first vote was taken on January 3. Ruby led on the first ballot, receiving seven votes. On the second ballot, Joseph McGrath took the lead with 8 votes to Ruby's 6, with 8 councilors voting for other candidates. The council remained deadlocked for weeks and Ruby threw his support behind Joseph Cox. Ruby believed that his candidacy had failed because of Antisemitism. In the 1933 election, Ruby finished third behind Maurice M. Goldman and Bernard Finkelstein. He was one of 8 councilors to lose reelection that year.

== Judiciary ==
In 1937, outgoing Governor James Michael Curley appointed Ruby to be a special justice of the Williamstown District Court. In 1938, Governor Charles F. Hurley promoted him to presiding justice. In 1950, Ruby was accused of unethical conduct and W. Arthur Garrity Jr. was appointed as a special prosecutor. On January 8, 1951, Massachusetts Supreme Judicial Court justice Edward A. Counihan sustained three of the charges against Ruby and disbarred him. The sustained charges were that Ruby had asked for $25 from a defendant in a gambling case, had solicited divorce business from the bench, and offered to "cinch" an eviction case for a landlord if he loaned him $200 or $300. Although he was disbarred, Ruby was allowed to remain on the bench, as Massachusetts law does not require a judge to be a member of the bar. On April 2, 1952, the Massachusetts Supreme Judicial Court upheld Ruby's disbarment. On April 30, 1952, the Massachusetts Bar Association filed a request for Ruby's impeachment with the Massachusetts General Court. The following day, Ruby resigned. Ruby died on September 7, 1983, in Springfield, Massachusetts. He was 95 years old. At the time of his death, Ruby was a resident of Longmeadow, Massachusetts.
