= William Simonds (author) =

American writer

- Born: October 30, 1822; Charlestown, Massachusetts, United States
- Died: July 7, 1859 (aged 36); Winchester, Massachusetts, United States
- Other name: Walter Aimwell (penname)
- Occupation: writer
- Known for: natural and attractive tales, accurate reflections of life
- Notable work: "The Aimwell Stories"

William Simonds (October 30, 1822 – July 7, 1859) was an American writer who usually used the pen-name Walter Aimwell.

He was born in Charlestown, Massachusetts, and his father died when he was young.

After attending school at Salem and spending some time in learning the jewelry business at Lynn, Massachusetts, he was apprenticed to a Boston printer in 1837. While thus engaged he wrote his first book, "The Pleasant Way" (1841), which was published by the Massachusetts Sabbath-school society. This was followed in 1845 by "The Sinner's Friend," which was also well received.

In December, 1845, he left the printing-office where he had spent nearly nine years, and early in 1846 began the publication of "The Boston Saturday Rambler," of which, after the first six months, he became the sole editor. In November, 1850, "The Rambler" was merged in the "New England Farmer," of which Simonds was general editor until his death. In 1848 he began the publication of a monthly entitled "The Pictorial National Library," but was unable to issue it longer than eighteen months. Mr. Simonds was convinced that he had a mission to perform in writing for the young, and he employed every means in his power to render his tales natural and attractive, and to make them accurate reflections of life. He died in Winchester, Massachusetts.

His chief work is "The Aimwell Stories", written under the pen-name of Walter Aimwell. These stories deal chiefly with New England farm-life. Their titles are:

1. Oscar; or, The Boy Who Had His Own Way (1854)
2. Clinton; or, Boy Life in the Country (1853)
3. Ella; or, Turning over a New Leaf (1855)
4. Whistler; or, The Manly Boy (1856)
5. Marcus; or, The Boy Tamer (1857)
6. Jessie; or, Trying To Be Somebody (1858)
7. Jerry; or, The Sailor Boy Ashore (1863)

The second book of the series, "Clinton", was published first. Simonds intended to extend the series to twelve volumes, but lived to complete only six. The last one, "Jerry," was left unfinished, and to it is added a memoir of the author.

Besides these books he published "Thoughts for the Thoughtless" (Boston, 1851); "The Boy's Own Guide" (1852); and "The Boy's Book of Morals and Manners" (1855).
