= John R. Connolly =

American politician (born 1973)

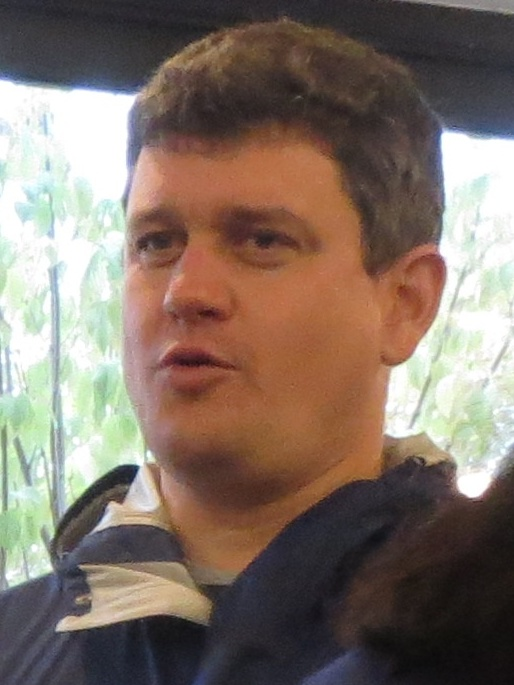
- Connolly in 2013

Member of the Boston City Council At-large
- In office January 2008 – January 2014
- Preceded by: Felix D. Arroyo
- Succeeded by: Michael F. Flaherty and Michelle Wu

Personal details
- Born: John Ronan Connolly; July 6, 1973 (age 53) Boston, Massachusetts, U.S.
- Party: Democratic
- Spouse: Megan Kassakian
- Children: 3
- Parent(s): Lynda M. and Michael J. Connolly
- Education: Harvard University (BA); Boston College (JD)

John Ronan Connolly (born July 6, 1973) is an American politician, lawyer, and educator from Massachusetts. He served from 2008 to 2014 as an at-large member of the Boston City Council, and was the runner-up in the 2013 Boston mayoral election. On the council and as a mayoral candidate, Connolly was known for his support of public school reforms. This included support for charter schools.

== Early life, family, and education ==
Connolly was born in the Roslindale neighborhood of Boston, Massachusetts. Connolly comes from a politically prominent and connected family. His mother, Lynda M. Connolly, was a lawyer and served as a Massachusetts court judge; and his father, Michael J. Connolly, served several terms as a state representative and four terms as the Massachusetts secretary of the commonwealth. James Michael Connolly (who served as a member of the Boston City Council in the 1970s) was an uncle of Connolly, being married to his maternal aunt.

Connolly grew up on Cerdan Avenue, near the border of the Roslindale and West Roxbury neighborhoods. Residents of the area were predominantly middle class and Irish Catholic. For high school, he attended Roxbury Latin School, an elite college prep school with a largely suburban-based student body. For his undergraduate college education, he attended Harvard University where he earned his B.A. cum laude. He later received a Juris Doctor from Boston College Law School in 2001.

== Teaching career ==
After graduating Harvard, Connolly worked for three years as a teacher, working in schools with low-income students. He later claimed during his 2013 campaign that he had been motivated to teach at low-income schools due to his recognition that he had enjoyed a number of advantages in his upbringing that were not equally available to lower-income neighborhoods in Boston. His first two years as a teacher were spent working at a Jesuit school on the Lower East Side neighborhood of New York City. He followed this with one year of teaching in Boston at the Boston Renaissance Charter Public School.

Connolly would later cite his experience of teaching at the two low-income schools as a pivotal experience for him, saying that it allowed him to see firsthand how, "poverty just becomes an incredible obstacle to someone's success." He subsequently reflected during his mayoral campaign that his year at Boston Renaissance Charter Public School was a difficult experience, characterizing the school as having been run poorly when he worked there.

== Legal career ==
After his three years of working as a teacher, Connolly attended and graduated from the Boston College School of Law (the same law school that his mother had received her own degree from). He thereafter practiced law in Boston, primarily focusing in corporate law, while occasionally handling matters related to bankruptcy law. While running for mayor in 2013, Connolly characterized his legal career (up to that point) as having involved various routine business transactions.

=== Ropes & Gray (2001–2004) ===
During his time in law school, Connolly received a competitive summer associate position at Ropes & Gray, a prominent law firm. This would ultimately lead to a position as an entry-level attorney in its corporate law division following his 2001 graduation from law school (at the age of 27). During his time at the firm, Connolly received mentoring from firm partner Mark V. Nuccio (who was himself an earlier graduate of the Boston College Law School).

Connolly's work as an attorney at Ropes & Gray included matters related to corporate transactions. One matter that he was involved in (per a biography that the firm wrote for him) was a leveraged buyout of "a large, privately held publishing company." Connolly himself would later say that he had been a junior lawyer on that matter, creating summaries of the company's business records for more senior lawyers to read. A matter he would later recall having had greater involvement in was the representation of the original owners of an air freight company in their negotiations to buy-back the company from its publicly traded parent company. While at the firm, he also carried out some pro bono legal work –including assisting a private school in its pursuit of nonprofit status.

Connolly would later reflect that his job at Ropes & Gray involved long (typically 80-hour) work weeks, for which he was well-paid (in excess of $100,000 annually, a significant amount for a newly-practicing lawyer). He recalled that he had found his long work weeks tiring and that they had limited the amount of time he was able to spend with his wife. (which in 2011 became known as "Murphy & King").

=== Hanify & King (2004–2007) ===
After working at Ropes & Gray for 2½ years, he departed in April 2004 to begin working at Hanify & King, a midsized firm (which in 2011 became known as "Murphy & King"). When joining Hanify & King, Connolly had expressed to the firm's lawyer's his interest in being assigned more trial work than he had been given at Ropes & Gray. However, he ultimately did very little trial work while at the firm. By his own admission during his time at Hanify & King, he received annually earnings that (similar to his time at Ropes & Gray) "hover[ed] around a little over" $100,000.

By the time he joined the firm, Connolly had already begun to develop an interest in seeking elected office. He would later reflect that he had found legal practice unfulfilling, which is what motivated him to run for office. In 2005, he took a leave of absence in order to run for the Boston City Council. His 2005 candidacy was ultimately unsuccessful. Connolly briefly returned to the firm, only to permanently depart from it in April 2007, in advance of his (ultimately successful) campaign in the 2007 Boston City Council election.

=== Schofield, Campbell & Connolly (2007–2012) ===
In May 2007, Connolly joined with two other lawyers (general practitioner Tim Schofield and criminal law attorney Cathleen Campbell) to become the third founding partner at a new small firm: Schofield, Campbell & Connolly. He would work at the firm until it split apart in 2012.

While Connolly continued to work on some business transaction legal matters at the firm, he focused the majority of his time each year on his public work as a member of the Boston City Council, as well as on political campaigning. An extreme example of this was in they year 2012, which he claimed to have only conducted ten hours of legal work for the entirety of. During Connolly's mayoral campaign, Schofield (who also served as co-chair of the campaign) corroborated that Connolly had focused the bulk of his time on city council work and campaigning. Schofield also noted that of the firm's three partners, Connolly had handled the least amount of legal work. During his later mayoral campaign, Connolly declined to publicly disclose what clients he had represented; citing attorney-client privilege. However, he shared a few example characterizations of the type of work he handled at the firm, including sharing that he had assisted an internet startup company to formulate its confidentiality policy and had advised a community theater on its business structure.

Connolly's annual financial disclosure (required of city councilors) showed him earning between $40,001–60,000 from the firm in 2008. This is an amount he claimed was derived from the structuring of his partnership, and an amount he claimed he paid back a substantial portion of to the firm. In the subsequent years, he reported far lower earnings from the firm. In 2009 he reported $5,000 or less, and in both 2010 and 2011 he reported $20,000 or less. His legal salaries came in addition to his $87,500 annual government salary for his work on the city council, which was his greatest source of salary earnings while on the council.

== Boston City Council ==
Connolly first sought election to an at-large seat on the Boston City Council in the 2005 election, but was unsuccessful. In 2007, Connolly ran again for an at-large seat and succeeded. He was re-elected in November 2009 and November 2011, forgoing an attempt at further re-election in 2013 in order to instead seek the city's mayoralty. His three terms on the council spanned from January 2008 until January 2014.

Connolly was best known as a councilor for his work in relation to education. He also did a notable amount of work as a councilor related to environmental matters. While city council elections are nonpartisan races, Connolly affiliated himself with the Democratic Party.

In council elections, his longtime base of support was centered in the West Roxbury and Roslindale neighborhoods. His support was particularly strong in West Roxbury.

=== 2005 and 2007 campaigns ===
Connolly unsuccessfully ran for an at-large seat in 2005.

Connolly ran again for an at-large seat in 2007, this time winning. Before the election, his campaign office admitted to mailing literature about incumbent councilor Stephen J. Murphy that contained claims which had come from an unknown source. The acknowledgement came after a Boston Herald columnist had accused the campaign of sending the unsigned, unattributed flyers.

=== First term (2008–09) and second term (2010–11) ===
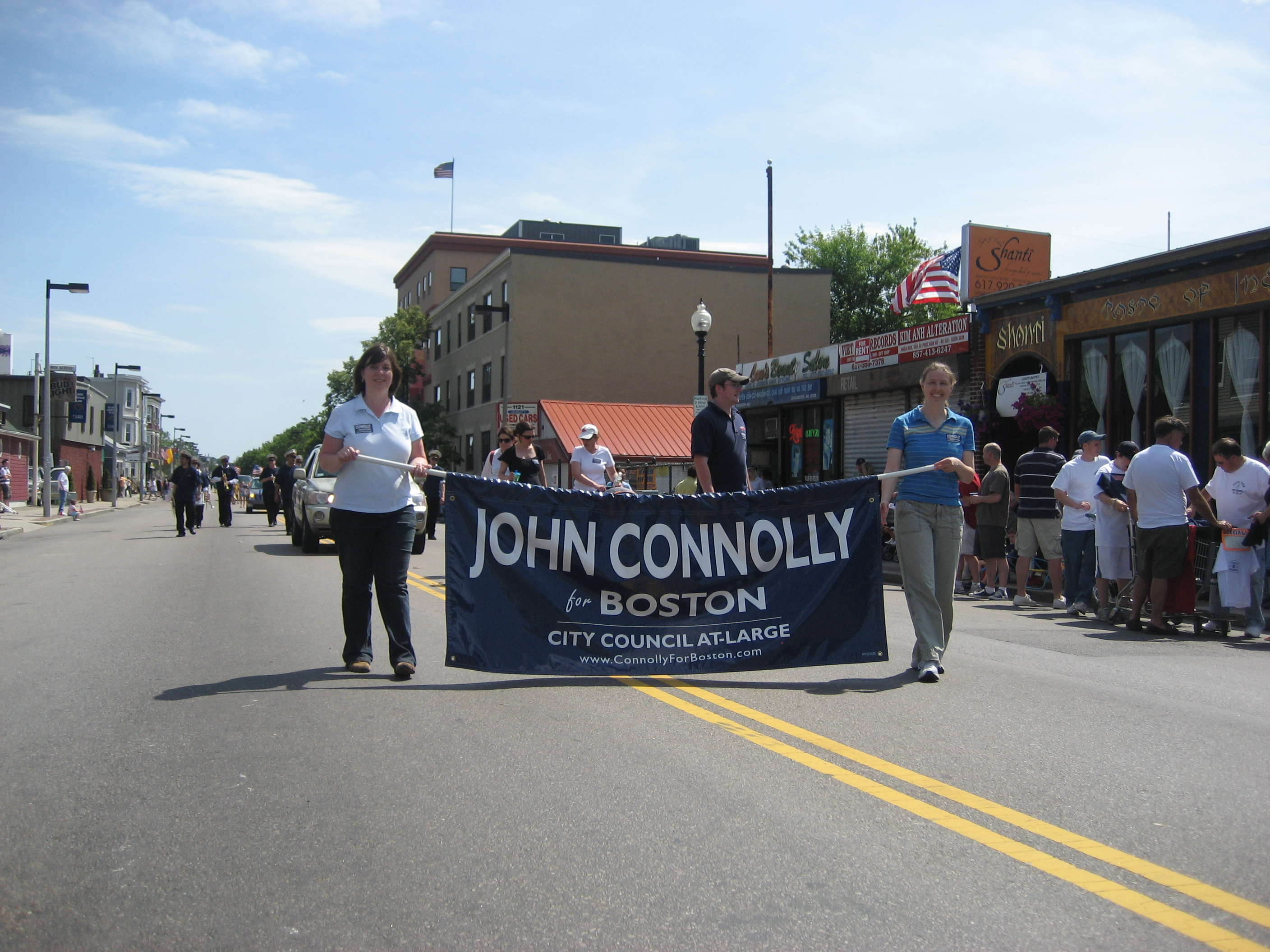
Supporters of Connolly's re-election campaign march in the 2009 Dorchester Day Parade

Connolly took office in January 2008. In 2009, Connolly proposed a measure imposing term limits on the mayor and city councilors. However, the city council rejected the measure.

In 2011, Connolly uncovered and publicized the fact that there was expired food in freezers at Boston schools. He had discovered he this while making surprise visits to the cafeterias at four different schools.

=== Third term (2012–13) ===
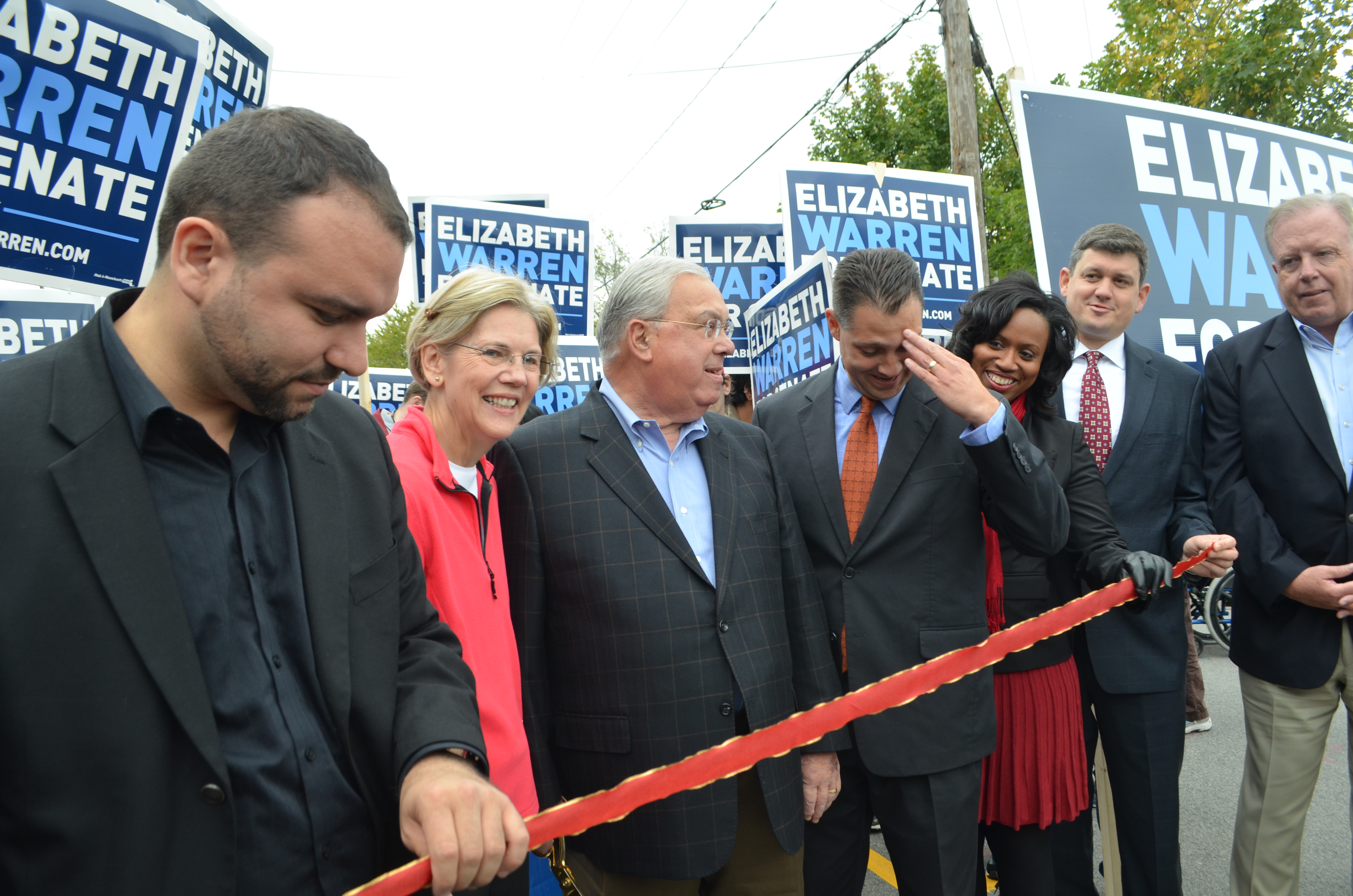
Connolly (second from right) at the 2012 East Boston Columbus Day Parade with other politicians, including Felix G. Arroyo, Elizabeth Warren, Thomas Menino, Ayanna Pressley, and Stephen J. Murphy

In 2012, Connolly was the only council member to vote against the city's teachers' union contract, opposing the fact that it did not extend the school day. Connolly also organized public hearings about the negotiations between the Boston School Department and the Boston Teachers Union. In 2012, Connolly publicly supported school reform legislation that was pending in the Massachusetts Senate. Also in 2012, Connolly called for the resignation of Boston Public Schools Superintendent Carol Johnson due to her failure to fire a school headmaster who had in criminal court entered an admission to sufficient facts for a jury to convict him of domestic violence allegations that he assaulted his wife. Connolly, in turn, faced criticism from many leaders in the city's communities of color for demanding the resignation of Johnson (who is African American, and was well-liked within the city's communities of color). Connolly also introduced an ordinance that would have held parents legally accountable for their children's truancy (frequent unexcused absences from school).

In December 2012, Connolly voted against an ordinance which created a requirement that residential rental unites be inspected every five years, with the owners of "problem properties" receiving $300 fines if added to a "chronic offender registry". The ordinance was strongly opposed by many Boston landlords, but was passed in the council by a vote of 9-4 vote and signed into law by Mayor Thomas Menino.

In the same council term, Connolly pledged to vote against a very substantial salary hike that had been proposed by some for the city’s police force.

== 2013 mayoral campaign ==
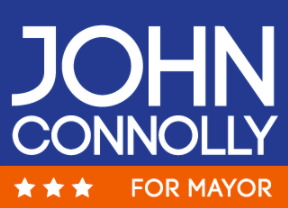
Mayoral campaign logo

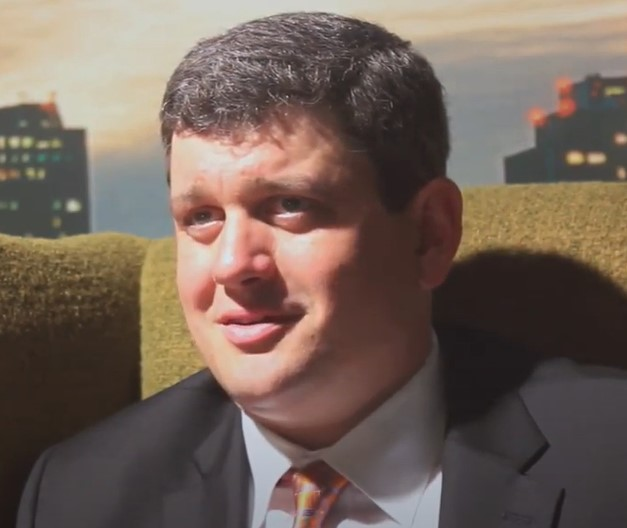
Connolly during a 2013 interview

Connolly was a candidate in the 2013 Boston mayoral election. Connolly finished second of 12 candidates in the preliminary election in September 2013, behind State Representative Marty Walsh. On November 5, 2013, Connolly lost the general election to Walsh.

=== Primary ===
In advance of launching his candidacy, Connolly began fundraising for his political committee, while publicly denying intentions of running for mayor. In December 2012, Connolly's committee raised $68,000, more money than any other city politician (including Mayor Menino) had raised for their committee that month.

Connolly announced his candidacy on February 26, 2013. His campaign kickoff raised $40,000, and in the month of February he raised a total of $70,000 leaving him with $350,000 in funds by the third week of his campaign, compared to $618,000 that Mayor Menino had on hand for his expected candidacy.

While Connolly had launched his candidacy at a moment when incumbent mayor Thomas Menino was largely expected to be seek a sixth term, this soon changed. On March 27, 2013, Menino announced that he would not be seeking election. Menino's retirement drastically changed the dynamics of the election, creating the first open race for Boston mayor in thirty years. A crowded field of contenders entered the race thereafter.

Connolly touted himself as an education-focused candidate, highlighting improvements to Boston Public Schools as the central issue of his campaign. To highlight the importance of school improvements in his platform, Connolly held the formal announcement his candidacy at the city's Brighton High School.

Connolly's candidacy received endorsements from each of the city's major newspapers' editorial boards. In the primary, the editorial board of The Boston Globe made a dual-endorsement of both Connolly and John Barros. In the primary, the editorial board of the Boston Herald made a dual endorsement of both Connolly and Daniel F. Conley. Connolly pledged that he would establish an "Office of Recovery Services" to combat substance addiction in the city. Among the endorsements that Connolly received from state legislatures was one from State Representative Nick Collins, seen as potentially influential in bolstering Connolly's support in the neighborhoods of Dorchester and South Boston –both of which were in Collins' district. Connolly also received the endorsement of State Representative Carlo Basile, regarded to be a powerbroker in East Boston politics and the head of a powerful local political operation. Basile had earlier endorsed Daniel F. Conley's candidacy for mayor, but defected to Connolly after Conley angered him with insufficient support for a proposed casino at Suffolk Downs.

After Connolly earned the endorsement of the group Stand for Children, several of his opponents cast a negative light on the group and its Connolly's decision to court their endorsement, with such criticisms even being given by opponents who had unsuccessfully sought the same group's endorsement.

Connolly's campaign benefited from substantial donations from lawyers and real estate developers. Real estate developers appreciated his opposition as a councilor to the recently enacted rent inspection ordinance.

=== General election ===
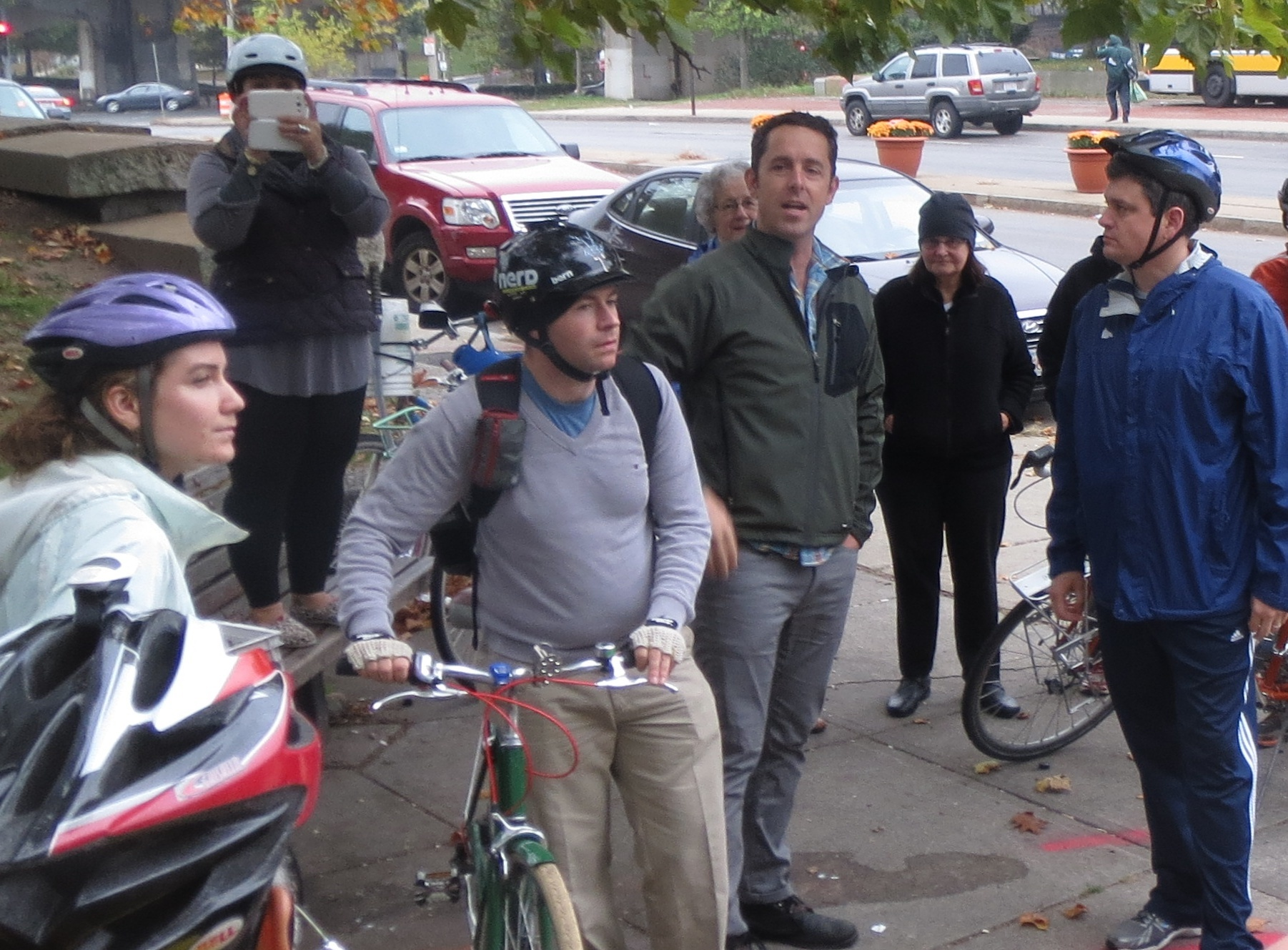
Connolly (far right) attends at an October 2013 cycling event

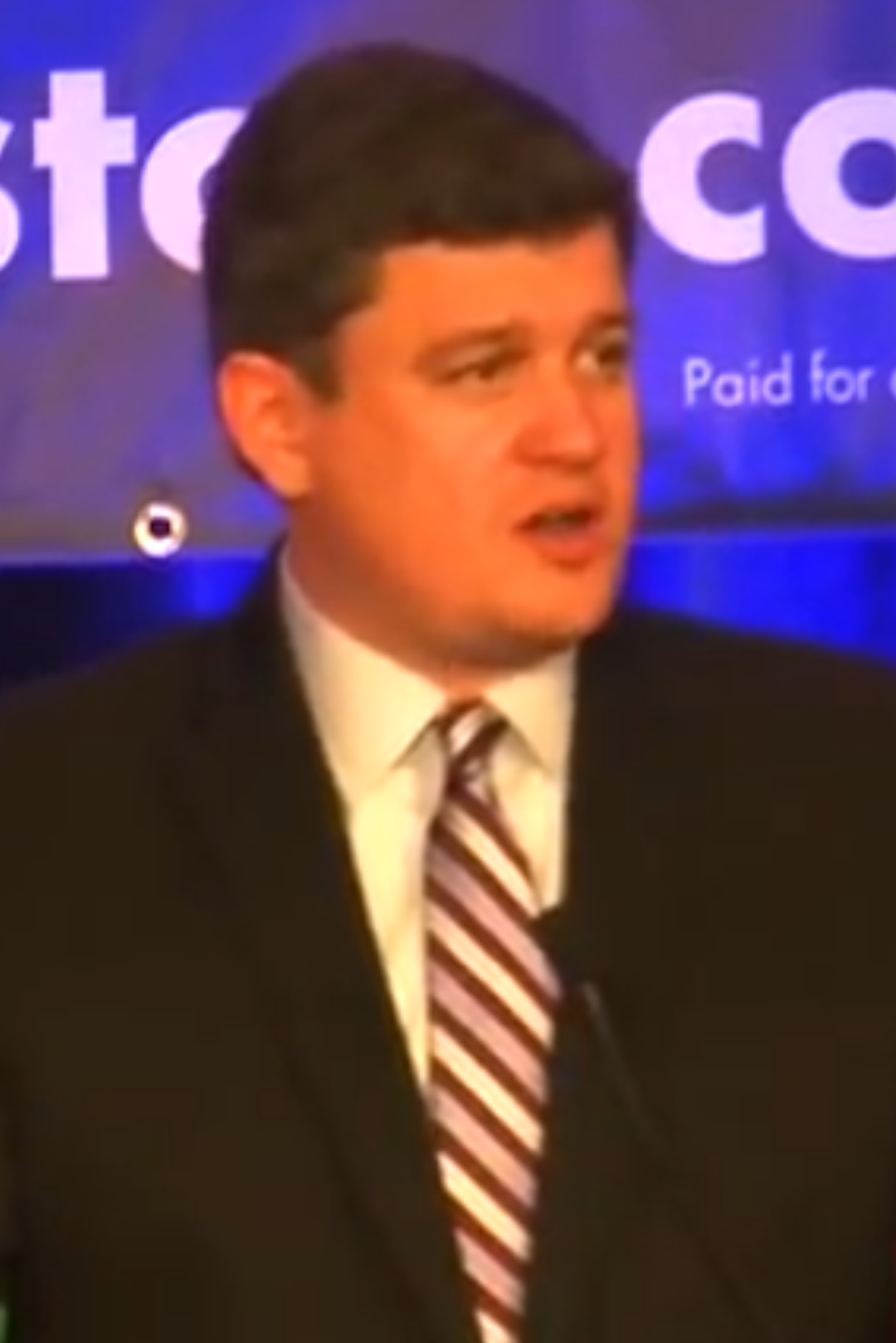
Connolly delivers his concession speech after losing the 2013 Boston mayoral election

Andrew Ryan of Boston.com wrote that the general election featured very few policy differences, and that Walsh won, in part, by projecting an "everyman" image and sharing a "compelling life story" involving his immigrant roots, childhood battle with cancer, and his battle with alcoholism. During the campaign, detractors sought to characterize Connolly as both separate from and detrimental towards the city's working class. They often pointed to his upbringing as a connected politician's son in a well-off neighborhood. They also pointed to his recent opposition to a very sizable proposed police salary hike. He was attacked by some labor unions during campaign as a “son of privilege" in an attempt to draw a negative contrast to Walsh’s upbringing in a working class section of Dorchester. However, Walsh urged his supporters against assailing Connolly as a "son of privilege". Connolly argued that his detractors' characterizations of his childhood neighborhood had overstated the extent of its affluence. However, he did concede that he indeed enjoyed a number of advantages as a child that were not ubiquitous across all of the city's neighborhoods.

Connolly rarely mentioned his legal career while campaigning, claiming that the practice of law "was never where [his] heart was." He gave very few specifics about the work he did as a layer, citing concerns of attorney-client privilege. He also refused requests by The Boston Globe for him to disclose a complete list of the clients that he had represented as a lawyer. Ropes & Gray also declined to disclose a list of clients that Connolly had worked for while at the firm. Legal analysts interviewed by The Boston Globe agreed that without the consent of his clients to release him from confidentially, the profession's ethical code would prohibit him from identifying them outside of two exceptions. The first exception would be any clients that he had represented in open court. Connolly claimed that in his entire legal career up to that time, he had only appeared before a judge one time, arguing a single motion in a case (the nature of which he claimed to lack recollection of). The second exception would have been any clients who Connolly had signed his name on a public legal documents for (as their connection would already be a matter of public record).

In contrast to Connolly's own reticence to discuss his legal career, his detractors made an issue of his legal career. Connolly was assailed by Walsh for his lack of disclosure of the clients that he had represented as a lawyer. Connolly stood by his refusal to disclose a list of his clients (citing attorney-client privilege), but insisted that did not "have anything to hide." Issue was also raised of the representation of landlords in eviction cases by Schofield, Campbell & Connolly. While Connolly acknowledged that the firm had indeed represented landlords, he denied that he had been himself involved in representation for eviction cases. Additionally, a labor organization that had endorsed Walsh's candidacy distributed fliers deriding Connolly as "a corporate lawyer", and which noted that one of the firms Connolly had previously worked for had boasted of work in defending employers against claims of discrimination. Connolly denied having been involved in such cases.

During Connolly's general election campaign, Connolly picked-up many prominent endorsements. He received the endorsements of nearly all North End elected officials (receiving endorsements from City Councilor Sal LaMattina and State Representatives Aaron M. Michlewitz, and Sal DiDomenico), with exception of State Senator Anthony Petruccelli (who endorsed Walsh). Ahead of the general election, the Boston Herald reiterated its endorsement of Connolly.

Connolly unsuccessfully courted the endorsement of third-place contender Charlotte Golar Richie, whose endorsement was regarded to hold potential sway with racial minority and female voters. However, Walsh instead managed to secure her endorsement. Connolly sought to counteract this and other high-profile endorsements that Walsh received by leaders hailing from the city's communities of color by himself touting endorsements from lower-profile figures hailing from the same communities, including local African American clergy. During the general election, both campaigns furiously sought to secure endorsements from within the city's communities of color, particularly its Black and Latino communities.

In early October, polls had Connolly leading the race. But by mid-October, polls showed the race having narrowed significantly. One factor that Andrew Ryan credited as contributing to Walsh overcoming Connolly's initial polling lead was the endorsements Walsh received from a number of eliminated first-round candidates, including John Barros, Felix G. Arroyo, and Charlotte Golar Richie, all of whom were regarded as holding sway with the city's racial and ethnic minority electorates. Connolly was defeated by Walsh, receiving 48.1% of the vote to Walsh's 51.5%. Among factors credited for Connolly's loss in the mayoral general election was a last-minute half-million dollars in television advertising against him and in support of Walsh, funded by the Boston Teachers Union. Connolly was a supporter of charter schools, and his education reform proposals had run into opposition from the union. Commentators also credited Walsh as having, "built a broad coalition" of different groups of voters that do not always vote uniformly. Yawu Miller of The Bay State Banner described Walsh as having attracted an "odd coalition of voters".

== Subsequent activities ==
Connolly founded the nonprofit 1647.

In 2018, Connolly was appointed by acting Massachusetts education commissioner Jeff Wulson to the state-appointed board overseeing the public schools of Lawrence, Massachusetts.

Connolly was involved with "Better Boston PAC", which supported Andrea Campbell's unsuccessful campaign in the 2021 Boston mayoral election primary.

== Personal life ==
Connolly married Meg Kassakian (who took the married name, "Meg Kassakian Connolly"). Mrs. Connolly is a clinical psychologist, who originally grew up in Newton, Massachusetts and received her undergraduate education at Harvard University where she captained the women's soccer team. Together, the Connolly's have three children.

Connolly's wife has Armenian-American heritage through her paternal grandmother Mary Kassakian (née Kondrajian), and has proudly celebrated this heritage. Mrs. Connolly's grandmother had immigrated with her family to the United States at Ellis Island in 1910, leaving Sivas, Turkey amid an atmosphere of hostility towards Armenians that proceeded the Armenian genocide that took place there years later. Mugerdich Kondrajian (Mary Kassakian's father, and Mrs. Connolly's great-grandfather) was one of the founding member of the New York chapter of the Armenian General Benevolent Union. Connolly himself has relatives with ties to Armenia, including his uncle Greg Connolly. In 2013, she disclosed that when the two were engaged many years earlier, she had fought a bout with lymphoma (a form of blood cancer).

== Electoral history ==
=== City Council ===
2005 Boston City Council at-large election
| Candidates | Preliminary Election | | General Election | |
| Candidates | Votes | % | Votes | % |
|---|---|---|---|---|
| Michael F. Flaherty (incumbent) | 17,828 | 13.90 | 49,220 | 17.58 |
| Felix D. Arroyo (incumbent) | 15,690 | 12.23 | 43,533 | 15.55 |
| Sam Yoon | 13,165 | 10.27 | 41,891 | 14.96 |
| Stephen J. Murphy (incumbent) | 14,094 | 10.99 | 35,553 | 12.70 |
| John R. Connolly | 14,287 | 11.14 | 31,629 | 11.30 |
| Matt O'Malley | 12,070 | 9.41 | 28,318 | 10.12 |
| Patricia H. White | 12,895 | 10.05 | 26,999 | 9.64 |
| Edward M. Flynn | 11,092 | 8.65 | 21,778 | 7.78 |
| Althea Garrison | 4,824 | 3.76 | | |
| Kevin R. Mccrea | 3,661 | 2.85 | | |
| Roy Owens | 3,622 | 2.82 | | |
| Laura Garza | 1,807 | 1.41 | | |
| Gregory Joseph O'Connell | 1,174 | 0.92 | | |
| Martin J. Hogan | 1,031 | 0.80 | | |
| Joseph Ready | 675 | 0.53 | | |
| Joseph Ureneck | 17† | 0.01 | 133† | 0.05 |
| Gibran Rivera | 17† | 0.01 | | |
| all others | 297 | 0.23 | 874 | 0.31 |

† write-in votes

2007 Boston City Council at-large election
| Candidates | General Election | |
| Candidates | Votes | % |
|---|---|---|
| Michael F. Flaherty (incumbent) | 25,863 | 20.57 |
| Stephen J. Murphy (incumbent | 23,659 | 18.82 |
| Sam Yoon (incumbent) | 23,230 | 18.48 |
| John R. Connolly | 21,997 | 17.50 |
| Felix D. Arroyo (incumbent) | 18,579 | 14.78 |
| Martin J. Hogan | 4008 | 3.19 |
| Matthew Geary | 3030 | 2.41 |
| William P. Estrada | 2439 | 1.94 |
| David James Wyatt | 2383 | 1.90 |
| all others | 542 | 0.43 |

2009 Boston City Council at-large election
| Candidates | Preliminary Election | | General Election | |
| Candidates | Votes | % | Votes | % |
|---|---|---|---|---|
| John R. Connolly (incumbent) | 35,182 | 18.08 | 51,362 | 18.35 |
| Stephen J. Murphy (incumbent) | 30,365 | 15.61 | 51,008 | 18.22 |
| Felix G. Arroyo | 25,859 | 13.29 | 45,144 | 16.13 |
| Ayanna Pressley | 16,866 | 8.67 | 41,879 | 14.96 |
| Tito Jackson | 12,535 | 6.44 | 30,203 | 10.79 |
| Andrew Kenneally | 12,653 | 6.50 | 24,249 | 8.66 |
| Tomás González | 10,122 | 5.20 | 18,310 | 6.54 |
| Doug Bennett | 10,529 | 5.41 | 16,842 | 6.02 |
| Ego Ezedi | 9,260 | 4.76 | | |
| Hiep Quoc Nguyen | 7,691 | 3.95 | | |
| Sean H. Ryan | 6,665 | 3.43 | | |
| Jean-Claude Sanon | 5,386 | 2.77 | | |
| Robert Fortes | 5,071 | 2.61 | | |
| Bill Trabucco | 3,132 | 1.61 | | |
| Scotland Willis | 2,639 | 1.36 | | |
| all others | 595 | 0.31 | 951 | 0.34 |

2011 Boston City Council at-large election
| Candidates | General Election | |
| Candidates | Votes | % |
|---|---|---|
| Ayanna Pressley (incumbent) | 37,532 | 21.42 |
| Felix G. Arroyo (incumbent) | 35,483 | 20.25 |
| John R. Connolly (incumbent) | 32,827 | 18.74 |
| Stephen J. Murphy (incumbent) | 26,730 | 15.26 |
| Michael F. Flaherty | 25,805 | 14.73 |
| Will Dorcena | 8,739 | 4.99 |
| Sean H. Ryan | 7,376 | 4.21 |
| Althea Garrison (write-in) | 19 | 0.01 |
| Deshon Porter (write-in) | 2 | 0.00 |
| William B. Feegbeh (write-in) | 1 | 0.00 |
| all others | 666 | 0.39 |

=== Mayor ===
2013 Boston mayoral election
| Candidate | Primary election | | General election | |
| Candidate | Votes | % | Votes | % |
|---|---|---|---|---|
| Marty Walsh | 20,854 | 18.47 | 72,583 | 51.54 |
| John R. Connolly | 19,435 | 17.21 | 67,694 | 48.07 |
| Charlotte Golar Richie | 15,546 | 13.77 | | |
| Daniel F. Conley | 12,775 | 11.32 | | |
| Felix G. Arroyo | 9,895 | 8.76 | | |
| John Barros | 9,148 | 8.10 | | |
| Robert Consalvo | 8,603 | 7.62 | | |
| Michael P. Ross | 8,164 | 7.23 | | |
| Bill Walczak | 3,825 | 3.39 | | |
| Charles Yancey | 2,389 | 2.12 | | |
| Charles Clemons | 1,800 | 1.59 | | |
| David Wyatt | 334 | 0.30 | | |
| Write-ins | 130 | 0.12 | 560 | 0.40 |
| Total | 112,898 | 100 | 140,837 | 100 |
