= 2017 Boston mayoral election =

Election in Massachusetts, United States

- November 7, 2017
- Turnout: 27.80% ▼10.05 pp
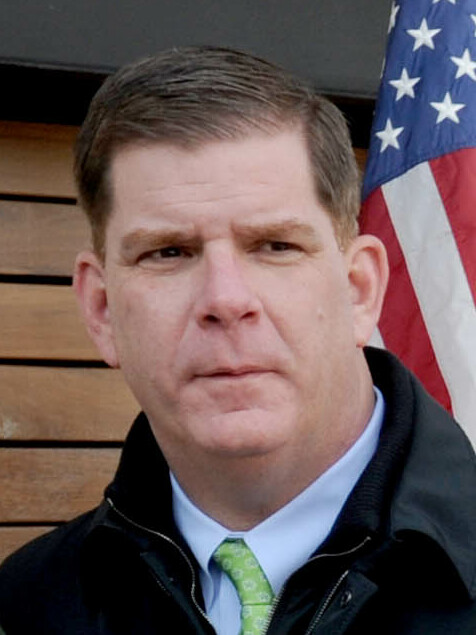

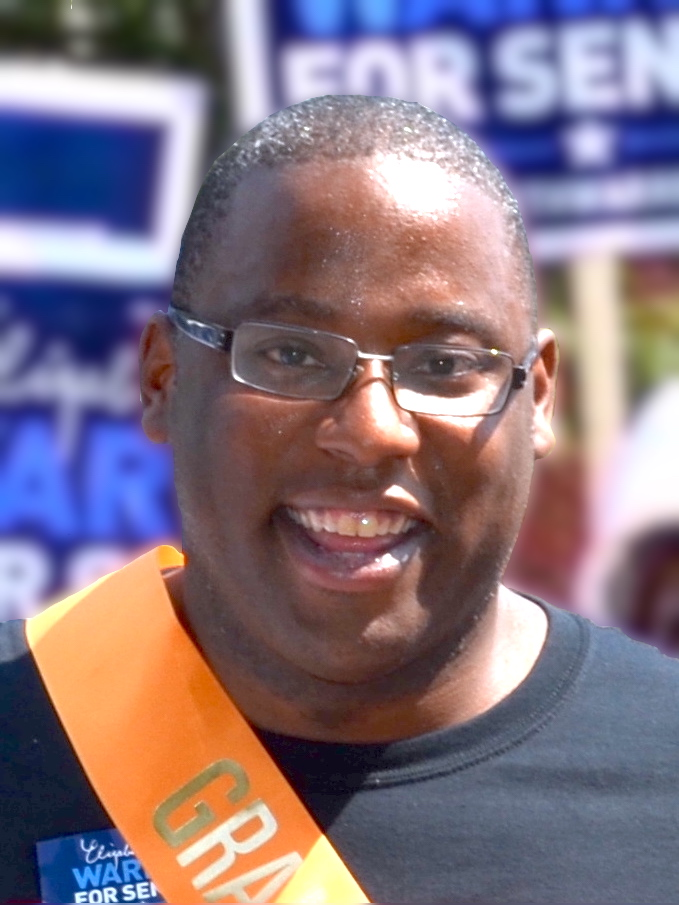
Candidate	Marty Walsh	Tito Jackson
Party	Nonpartisan	Nonpartisan
Popular vote	70,197	36,472
Percentage	65.37%	33.97%
- Walsh: 50–60% 60–70% 70–80% 80–90% 90–100% Jackson: 50–60% 60–70% 70–80% Tie: 40–50%
Mayor before election
Marty Walsh
Elected mayor
Marty Walsh

The Boston mayoral election of 2017 was held on Tuesday, November 7, 2017, to elect the mayor of Boston, Massachusetts. Incumbent Democratic mayor Marty J. Walsh won re-election to a second term, defeating District 7 City Councilor Tito Jackson, and two long-shot candidates, Robert Cappucci and Joseph Wiley.

A non-partisan preliminary election was held on Tuesday, September 26, 2017, with Walsh and Jackson advancing into a November runoff election. In the November election, Walsh secured a landslide victory, winning by a two-to-one margin. A total of 109,034 of the city's approximately 392,000 registered voters cast a ballot in the November election. The voter turnout of 27.80% was down ten percentage points from the 2013 mayoral election, which generated more excitement as the first Boston mayoral race in a generation without an incumbent.

== Candidates ==
=== Candidates who advanced to general election ===
Candidate	Experience	Announced	Ref
The following candidates advanced to the general election held on November 7			
Tito Jackson	Boston city councilor from district 7 since 2011	January 12, 2017	
Marty Walsh	Incumbent mayor since 2014	September 9, 2015	

=== Candidates eliminated in the primary ===
Candidate	Experience	Announced	Ref
The following candidates were eliminated in the primary election and did not advance to the general election			
Robert Cappucci	Former Boston School Committee member Candidate for mayor in 2013		
Joseph Wiley	Insurance worker		

== Primary election ==
=== Polling ===
Poll source	Date(s) administered	Sample size	Margin of error	Robert Cappucci	Tito Jackson	Marty Walsh	Joseph Wiley	Undecided
Suffolk University/Boston Globe	June 2017	500 RV	± 4.4%	4%	23%	54%	1%	18%
Emerson College	September 14–16, 2017	529 LV	± 4.2%	7%	24%	60%	5%	–

== General election ==
=== Endorsements ===
By October 2017, ten of the 13 Boston City Council members endorsed Walsh for re-election. Ayanna Pressley remained neutral due to her husband being employed by the mayor, and Andrea Campbell declined to comment on her preference.

The editorial boards of both of Boston's major daily newspapers endorsed Walsh, with The Boston Globe editorial board endorsing him for a second time, citing his success in handling housing and the city's vibrancy during his first term. The Boston Herald editorial board also endorsed Walsh, saying the newspaper was wrong not to give their endorsement to Walsh in 2013.

Tito Jackson

Individuals

- Jonathan Kozol, author and children's advocate
Marty Walsh

Federal officials

- Ed Markey, U.S. senator from Massachusetts
- Elizabeth Warren, U.S. senator from Massachusetts

State officials

- Nick Collins, Massachusetts state representative
- Kevin Honan, Massachusetts state representative

Local officials

- Frank Baker, Boston city councilmember from District 3
- Mark Ciommo, Boston city councilmember from District 9
- Michael F. Flaherty, Boston city councilmember at-large and candidate for mayor in 2009
- Annissa Essaibi George, Boston city council member (at-large)
- Salvatore LaMattina, Boston city councilmember from District 1
- Bill Linehan, Boston city councilmember from District 2
- Timothy McCarthy, Boston city councilmember from District 5)
- Josh Zakim, Boston city councilmember at-large

Individuals

- Steven Tolman, president of the Massachusetts AFL–CIO

Organizations

- Planned Parenthood

Newspapers

- The Boston Globe
- Boston Herald

=== Polling ===
Poll source	Date(s) administered	Sample size	Margin of error	Tito Jackson	Marty Walsh	Undecided
Emerson College	September 14–16, 2017	529 LV	± 4.2%	26%	55%	19%
WBUR-FM	September 27 – October 1, 2017	405	± 4.9%	24%	60%	16%
Emerson College	October 19–20, 2017	532 LV	± 4.2%	23%	61%	16%

== Results ==
2017 Boston mayoral election
Primary election
Party	Candidate	Votes	%
Nonpartisan	Marty Walsh (incumbent)	34,882	62.52
Nonpartisan	Tito Jackson	16,216	29.07
Nonpartisan	Robert Cappucci	3,736	6.70
Nonpartisan	Joseph Wiley	529	0.95
Write-in		428	0.77
Total votes		55,791	100
General election
Nonpartisan	Marty Walsh (incumbent)	70,197	65.37
Nonpartisan	Tito Jackson	36,472	33.97
Write-in		708	0.66
Total votes		107,377	100

== See also ==
- List of mayors of Boston, Massachusetts
