= 2005 Boston City Council election =

- November 8, 2005

Boston City Council elections were held on November 8, 2005. Ten seats (six district representatives and four at-large members) were contested in the general election, as the incumbents in districts 5, 7, and 8 were unopposed. Five seats (the four at-large members, and district 9) had also been contested in the preliminary election held on September 27, 2005.

== At-large ==
Councillors Michael F. Flaherty, Felix D. Arroyo, and Stephen J. Murphy were re-elected, while the seat formerly held by Maura Hennigan was won by Sam Yoon. Hennigan did not seek re-election, as she ran for Mayor of Boston; she was defeated by incumbent Thomas Menino in the general election. Yoon became the first Asian American to hold elected office in Boston.

=== At-large candidates ===
Elected

- Felix D. Arroyo: incumbent
- Michael F. Flaherty: incumbent
- Stephen J. Murphy: incumbent
- Sam Yoon: community organizer

Lost in general election

- John R. Connolly: lawyer; son of Michael J. Connolly (former secretary of the commonwealth) and Lynda M. Connolly (First Judge of the Dedham District Court)
- Ed Flynn: U.S. Navy veteran, probation officer, substitute teacher; son of Raymond Flynn (former mayor of Boston)
- Patricia H. White: daughter of Kevin White (former mayor of Boston and secretary of the commonwealth), unsuccessful at-large council in 2003

Lost in primary election

- Althea Garrison: former state senator, perennial candidate
- Laura Garza: activist and perennial candidate
- Martin J. Hogan
- Kevin R. McCrea: Wabash Construction company owner, developer, landlord, government reform activist
- Gregory Joseph O'Connell
- Roy Owens: perennial candidate
- Joseph Ready

Write-in contenders

- Gibran Rivera
- Joseph Ureneck

=== At-large results ===
Candidates	Preliminary election		General election	
Candidates	Votes	%	Votes	%
Michael F. Flaherty (incumbent)	17,828	13.90	49,220	17.58
Felix D. Arroyo (incumbent)	15,690	12.23	43,533	15.55
Sam Yoon	13,165	10.27	41,891	14.96
Stephen J. Murphy (incumbent)	14,094	10.99	35,553	12.70
John R. Connolly	14,287	11.14	31,629	11.30
Matt O'Malley	12,070	9.41	28,318	10.12
Patricia H. White	12,895	10.05	26,999	9.64
Edward M. Flynn	11,092	8.65	21,778	7.78
Althea Garrison	4,824	3.76		
Kevin R. McCrea	3,661	2.85		
Roy Owens	3,622	2.82		
Laura Garza	1,807	1.41		
Gregory Joseph O'Connell	1,174	0.92		
Martin J. Hogan	1,031	0.80		
Joseph Ready	675	0.53		
Joseph Ureneck	17†	0.01	133†	0.05
Gibran Rivera	17†	0.01		
all others	297	0.23	874	0.31

† write-in votes

== District 1 ==
=== General election ===
Councillor Paul Scapicchio was re-elected.

Candidates	General Election	
Candidates	Votes	%
Paul Scapicchio (incumbent)	7,027	86.23
Ben Joplin	1,084	13.30
all others	38	0.47

=== Special election ===
Scapicchio resigned his seat effective April 30, 2006, in order to join a private lobbying firm. This created a vacancy that needed to be filled by a special election, which took place on June 13, 2006, with the preliminary election on May 16, 2006. Salvatore LaMattina was elected to serve the remainder of Scapicchio's term.

Candidates	Special Prelim. election		Special Gen. election	
Candidates	Votes	%	Votes	%
Salvatore LaMattina	3,336	53.26	4,229	50.85
Daniel J. Ryan	2,010	32.09	4,073	48.97
Peter Borre	681	10.87		
Christine Amisano	143	2.28		
Anthony L. Dantona Sr.	64	1.02		
John Toby Knudsen	13	0.21		
all others	17	0.27	15	0.18

== District 2 ==
=== General election ===
Councillor James M. Kelly was re-elected.

Candidates	General election	
Candidates	Votes	%
James M. Kelly (incumbent)	7,047	60.93
Susan M. Passoni	4,475	38.69
all others	44	0.38

=== Special election ===
Kelly died in January 2007, creating a vacancy that needed to be filled by a special election, which took place on May 15, 2007, with the preliminary election on April 17, 2007. Bill Linehan was elected to serve the remainder of Kelly's term.

Candidates	Special Prelim. Election		Special Gen. Election	
Candidates	Votes	%	Votes	%
Bill Linehan	1,834	23.68	4,771	52.58
Susan M. Passoni	1,870	24.14	4,217	46.48
Edward M. Flynn	1,741	22.48	52†	0.57
Robert O'Shea	831	10.73		
Brian R. Mahoney	549	7.09		
Mary Cooney	529	6.83%		
Bob Ferrara	384	4.96		
all others	7	0.09	33	0.36

† write-in votes

== District 3 ==
Councillor Maureen Feeney was re-elected.

Candidates	General election	
Candidates	Votes	%
Maureen Feeney (incumbent)	7,559	80.30
Michael J. Cote	1,816	19.29
all others	39	0.41

== District 4 ==
Councillor Charles Yancey was re-elected.

Candidates	General election	
Candidates	Votes	%
Charles Yancey (incumbent)	6,724	88.52
J. R. Rucker	851	11.20
Jaha Hughes	4†	0.05
all others	17	0.22

† write-in votes

== District 5 ==
Councillor Robert Consalvo ran unopposed and was re-elected.

Candidates	General election	
Candidates	Votes	%
Robert Consalvo (incumbent)	8,844	98.86
all others	102	1.14

== District 6 ==
Councillor John M. Tobin Jr. was re-elected.

Candidates	General election	
Candidates	Votes	%
John M. Tobin Jr. (incumbent)	10,194	63.80
Gibran Rivera	5,741	35.93
all others	42	0.26

== District 7 ==
Councillor Chuck Turner ran unopposed and was re-elected.

Candidates	General election	
Candidates	Votes	%
Chuck Turner (incumbent)	6,628	98.81
all others	80	1.19

== District 8 ==
Councillor Michael P. Ross ran unopposed and was re-elected.

Candidates	General election	
Candidates	Votes	%
Michael P. Ross (incumbent)	4,409	97.29
all others	123	2.71

== District 9 ==
Councillor Jerry P. McDermott was re-elected.

Candidates	Preliminary election		General election	
Candidates	Votes	%	Votes	%
Jerry P. McDermott (incumbent)	2,145	66.22	4,144	68.19
Paul F. Creighton Jr.	848	26.18	1,877	30.89
Daniel Kontoff	235	7.26		
all others	11	0.34	56	0.92

== See also ==
- List of members of the Boston City Council
- 2005 Boston mayoral election
