= 2013 Boston City Council election =

Election in Boston, Massachusetts, US

- November 5, 2013

Boston City Council elections were held on November 5, 2013. Twelve seats (eight district representatives and four at-large members) were contested in the general election, as the incumbent in district 3 was unopposed. Eight seats (the four at-large members, and districts 1, 4, 5, and 8) had also been contested in the preliminary election held on September 24, 2013.

== At-large ==
Councillors Ayanna Pressley and Stephen J. Murphy were re-elected, while the seats formerly held by John R. Connolly and Felix G. Arroyo were won by Michael F. Flaherty and Michelle Wu. Connolly and Arroyo did not seek re-election, as they ran for mayor of Boston; Arroyo was eliminated in the preliminary election, while Connolly was defeated by Marty Walsh in the general election.

Candidates	Preliminary election		General election	
Candidates	Votes	%	Votes	%
Ayanna Pressley (incumbent)	42,915	16.71	60,799	18.30
Michelle Wu	29,384	11.44	59,741	17.98
Michael F. Flaherty	39,904	15.54	55,104	16.59
Stephen J. Murphy (incumbent)	31,728	12.35	44,993	13.54
Annissa Essaibi George	12,244	4.77	30,538	9.19
Jeffrey Michael Ross	13,939	5.43	28,879	8.69
Martin J. Keogh	15,743	6.13	26,500	7.98
Jack F. Kelly III	11,909	4.64	23,967	7.22
Catherine M. O'Neill	10,952	4.26		
Althea Garrison	10,268	4.00		
Ramon Soto	9,928	3.87		
Philip Arthur Frattaroli	5,832	2.27		
Gareth R. Saunders	5,363	2.09		
Christopher J. Conroy	3,433	1.34		
Seamus M. Whelan	3,118	1.21%		
Francisco L. White	2,745	1.07		
Douglas D. Wohn	2,382	0.93		
Frank John Addivinola Jr.	2,240	0.87		
Keith B. Kenyon	1,950	0.76		
Jamarhl Crawford	21†	0.01		
all others	832	0.32	1658	0.50

† write-in votes

== District 1 ==
Councillor Salvatore LaMattina was re-elected.

Candidates	Preliminary election		General election	
Candidates	Votes	%	Votes	%
Salvatore LaMattina	7,070	73.38%	9,999	70.73%
Brian J. Gannon	1,526	15.84%	4,068	28.78%
John Ribeiro Jr.	996	10.34%		
all others	43	0.45%	70	0.50%

== District 2 ==
Councillor Bill Linehan was re-elected.

Candidates	General election	
Candidates	Votes	%
Bill Linehan	9,322	52.88%
Suzanne Lee	8,250	46.80%
all others	58	0.33%

== District 3 ==
Councillor Frank Baker ran unopposed and was re-elected.

Candidates	General election	
Candidates	Votes	%
Frank Baker	9,945	97.76%
all others	228	2.24%

== District 4 ==
Councillor Charles Yancey was re-elected.

Candidates	Preliminary election		General election	
Candidates	Votes	%	Votes	%
Charles Yancey	6,144	65.39%	8,145	68.34%
Terrance J. Williams	1,547	30.84%	3,676	16.46%
Steven Godfrey	849	9.04%		
Divo Rodrigues Monteiro	768	8.17%		
all others	88	0.94%	98	0.82%

== District 5 ==
The seat formerly held by Robert Consalvo was won by Timothy McCarthy. Consalvo did not seek re-election, as he was running for mayor of Boston.

Candidates	Preliminary election		General election	
Candidates	Votes	%	Votes	%
Timothy McCarthy	3,732	24.30%	9,603	54.65%
Jean-Claude Sanon	3,055	19.89%	7,881	44.85%
Mimi E. Turchinetz	2,691	17.52%		
Ava D. Callender	1,795	11.69%		
Patrice Gattozzi	1,426	9.29%		
Andrew Norman Cousino	1,377	8.97%		
Michael E. Wells III	705	4.59%		
Margherita Ciampa-Coyne	515	3.35%		
all others	61	0.40%	88	0.50%

== District 6 ==
Councillor Matt O'Malley was re-elected.

Candidates	General election	
Candidates	Votes	%
Matt O'Malley	18,204	85.08%
Luis F. Valerio	3,088	14.43%
all others	105	0.49%

== District 7 ==
Councillor Tito Jackson was re-elected.

Candidates	General election	
Candidates	Votes	%
Tito Jackson	7,676	74.61%
Roy Owens	1,680	16.33%
Jamarhl C. Crawford	653†	6.35%
all others	279	2.71%

† write-in votes

== District 8 ==
The seat formerly held by Michael P. Ross was won by Josh Zakim. Ross did not seek re-election, as he was running for mayor of Boston.

Candidates	Preliminary election		General election	
Candidates	Votes	%	Votes	%
Josh Zakim	2,691	45.32%	4,498	52.39%
Michael Joseph Nichols	1,619	27.27%	4,038	47.03%
Gloria Murray	841	14.16%		
Thomas Joseph Dooley III	499	8.40%	11†	0.13%
Angelica Elle Addivinola	259	4.36%		
all others	29	0.49%	39	0.45%

† write-in votes

== District 9 ==
Councillor Mark Ciommo was re-elected.

Candidates	General election	
Candidates	Votes	%
Mark Ciommo	6,271	81.78%
Michael C. Bronner	1,330	17.34%
all others	67	0.87%

== See also ==
- List of members of the Boston City Council
- 2013 Boston mayoral election
