= 2011 Boston City Council election =

- November 8, 2011

Boston City Council elections were held on November 8, 2011. Eight seats (four district representatives and four at-large members) were contested in the general election, as the incumbents in districts 1, 5, 6, 8, and 9 were unopposed. Three seats (districts 2, 3, and 7) had also been contested in the preliminary election held on September 27, 2011.

== At-large ==
Councillors John R. Connolly, Stephen J. Murphy, Felix G. Arroyo, and Ayanna Pressley were re-elected to the four at-large seats. Pressley's victory made her the first woman of color to be re-elected to the council; entering 2012, she was the only female member of the council.

Candidates	General election	
Candidates	Votes	%
Ayanna Pressley	37,532	21.42%
Felix G. Arroyo	35,483	20.25%
John R. Connolly	32,827	18.74%
Stephen J. Murphy	26,730	15.26%
Michael F. Flaherty	25,805	14.73%
Will Dorcena	8,739	4.99%
Sean H. Ryan	7,376	4.21%

== District 1 ==
Councillor Salvatore LaMattina ran unopposed.

== District 2 ==
Councillor Bill Linehan was re-elected.

Candidates	Preliminary election		General election	
Candidates	Votes	%	Votes	%
Bill Linehan	2,334	35.02%	5,078	50.28%
Suzanne Lee	2,608	39.14%	4,981	49.32%
Bob Ferrara	1,689	25.35%		

== District 3 ==
Councillor Maureen Feeney, a member of the council since 1994, did not seek re-election; she subsequently took the job of city clerk. Frank Baker was elected.

Candidates	Preliminary election		General election	
Candidates	Votes	%	Votes	%
Frank Baker	2,338	31.53%	5,262	55.78%
John O'Toole	1,916	25.84%	4,120	43.68%
Craig Galvin	1,769	23.86%		
Doug Bennett	703	9.48%		
Marydith Tuitt	334	4.50%		
Stephanie Everett	266	3.59%		
Martin Hogan	63	0.85%		

== District 4 ==
Councillor Charles Yancey was re-elected.

Candidates	General election	
Candidates	Votes	%
Charles Yancey	3,893	88.54%
J. R. Rucker	435	9.89%

== District 5 ==
Councillor Robert Consalvo ran unopposed.

== District 6 ==
Councillor Matt O'Malley ran unopposed. O'Malley had won his seat through a special election to fill a vacancy for District 6, which took place on November 16, 2010, with the preliminary election on October 19, 2010.

== District 7 ==
Councillor Tito Jackson was re-elected. Jackson had won his seat through a special election to fill a vacancy for District 7, which took place on March 15, 2011, with the preliminary election on February 15, 2011.

Candidates	Preliminary election		General election	
Candidates	Votes	%	Votes	%
Tito Jackson	1,876	76.07%	4,818	84.35%
Sheneal Parker	273	11.07%	799	13.99%
Althea Garrison	216	8.76%		
Roy Owens	85	3.45%		

== District 8 ==
Councillor Michael P. Ross ran unopposed.

== District 9 ==
Councillor Mark Ciommo ran unopposed.

== See also ==
- List of members of the Boston City Council
