= Felix Arroyo =

Felix Arroyo may refer to:

- Felix D. Arroyo (born 1948), city councilor in Boston, Massachusetts, 2003–2008
- Felix G. Arroyo (born 1979), his son, city councilor in Boston, Massachusetts, 2010–2014
