= Sam Yoon =

American politician (born 1970)

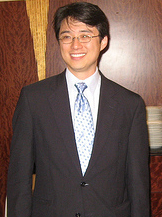
- Yoon in 2008

Member of the Boston City Council At-large
- In office 2006–2010
- Preceded by: Maura Hennigan
- Succeeded by: Ayanna Pressley and Felix G. Arroyo

Personal details
- Born: January 10, 1970 (age 56) Seoul, South Korea
- Party: Democratic
- Spouse: Tina Yoon (2000–2013)
- Children: Sean (Seonghyun) Yoon - 2003
- Education: Princeton University; Harvard Kennedy School
- Profession: Politician

Korean name
- Hangul: 윤상현
- RR: Yun Sanghyeon
- MR: Yun Sanghyŏn

Sam Sang Yoon (born January 10, 1970), born Yoon Sang-hyun (Korean: 윤상현), is an American politician. He is a former at-large member of the Boston City Council. He later served as the executive director for the Council of Korean Americans in Washington, DC. He was the first Asian American to hold elected office in Boston. He is a member of the United States Democratic Party.

== Early life and education ==
Yoon was born in Seoul, South Korea. His family moved to the United States when Yoon was ten months old. He was raised in Lebanon, Pennsylvania, and became an American citizen at ten years old. He attended Princeton University. After graduating, he spent two years teaching math at urban public schools in New Jersey.

He earned a degree from the Harvard Kennedy School at Harvard University. While at the Kennedy School, he worked with the Dudley Square Merchants Association to help them obtain a Main Street designation.

== Early career ==
After graduating from the Kennedy School, Yoon spent time working as a community organizer in Boston, providing housing for low income seniors and individuals coping with mental illnesses.

He later worked at the Community Builders, the nation's largest non-profit developer. Yoon also spent time working for Abt Associates, a public policy think tank, before becoming the Housing Director for the Asian Community Development Corporation.

== Boston City Council (2006–2009) ==
=== Elections ===
In 2005, was elected to an at-large council seat. Yoon won despite having lived in the city only for one year prior to his run. After placing 5th in the preliminary election, Yoon received 14.96% of the vote in the general election, placing third among eight candidates for four positions. Yoon's election was hailed by the local media as an important sign of the emergence of "New Boston", in which the city's traditional insider politics are becoming less important than before. Yoon's victory made have been aided by the fact that 2005 was the first election in which bilingual ballots were permitted, including ballots that used Chinese and English. Yoon was re-elected in November 2007, after receiving endorsements from many prominent Massachusetts politicians including Governor Deval Patrick and four other City Councilors, including Felix D. Arroyo and Chuck Turner. Yoon chose not to run for reelection in 2009 in order to run for mayor of Boston.

During the 2008 Democratic Party presidential primaries, Yoon endorsed the candidacy of Barack Obama.

=== Ordinances and policies ===
In 2007, Yoon introduced a resolution which would have ordered a study related to a housing project in the city that was in peril of losing federal funding. In 2008, co-sponsored a resolution to order a review of the city's dog ownership laws. That same year, Yoon championed plans to study the use of snow-melting machines and "illuminated sidewalks”.

In his first term, Yoon was praised for his efforts to secure $5 million in funding for programs to prevent youth violence. As a result of Yoon's efforts, hundreds of students rallied in the City Council Chambers during the 2006 budget hearing in support of the funding increases. When the measure was rejected and the students were expelled from the Chambers, Yoon voted against the budget. He also voted in favor of a salary increase for government employees, which he said would make positions more desirable for qualified candidates. The increase, which passed, included raising City Councilors' salaries from $75,000 to $87,500. Critics alleged that he did not regularly attend Wednesday Council meetings.

Yoon supported resolutions aiming to aid homeowners with energy bills and foreclosure avoidance.

Yoon took up the issue of government transparency on the Boston City Council. He requested the City Council minutes utilize "plain English" in order to make their contents more understandable to the general public. He requested for the city government's website to list the phone numbers for city commissions. He also called for the website to list as the names, duties, and length of term of the members of city commissions and boards.

Yoon successfully advocated against the removal of security guards at elderly housing complexes in Boston.

== 2009 Boston mayoral campaign ==
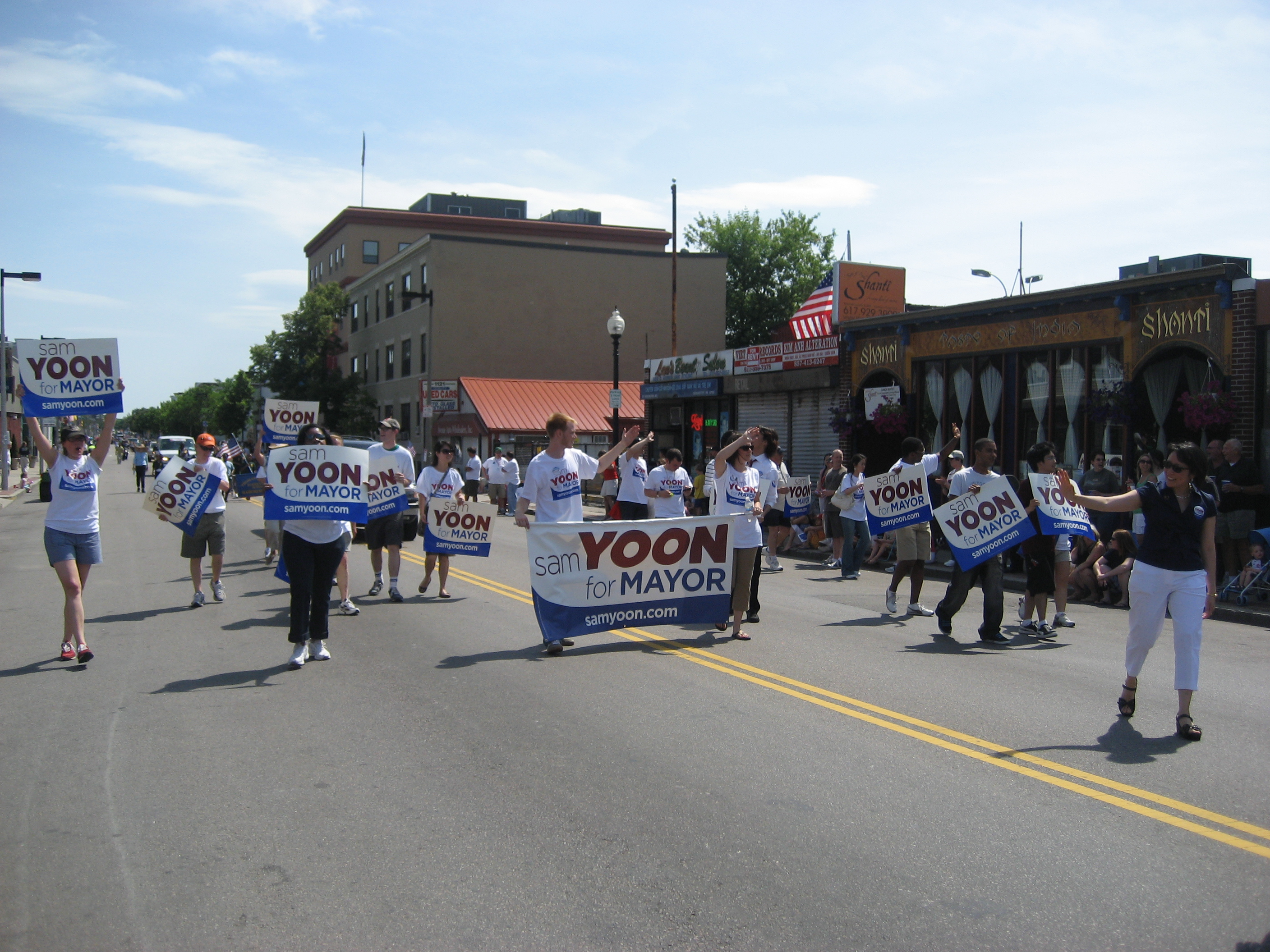
Supporters of Yoon's mayoral campaign marching in the 2009 Dorchester Day Parade

On February 8, 2009, Yoon announced he would be running for Mayor of Boston.

Yoon ran on a platform that advocated transparency and accountability at City Hall. He proposed eliminating the Boston Redevelopment Authority (BRA), an organization responsible for planning and development in Boston, and replacing it with community-focused development agency. Yoon also proposed overhauling Boston's transportation infrastructure, advocating a plan that would increase bike accessibility and would promote rapid transit.

Yoon's consultants included Jim Spencer, of the Campaign Network, a direct mail specialist who was the chief strategist on Yoon's city council runs; Jeff Hewitt, a media specialist who was his lead fundraising consultant; Joe Trippi, a social networking specialist who was the former campaign manager for Howard Dean's Presidential Campaign. Yoon's pollster was Tom Kiley, who previously worked for Deval Patrick and Joe Kennedy.

Yoon's strategy was to mobilize progressive voters in Boston who may have voted for Deval Patrick and Barack Obama, but who do not participate in municipal elections, which traditionally have low turnout. On July 11, Yoon's campaign had a volunteer recruitment session with Joe Trippi which detailed Yoon's strategy for winning.

Yoon expressed interest in changing the city away from its "strong mayor" system in which a large amount of power rested in the mayoralty.

Yoon's campaign was the first Boston mayoral campaign by a candidate of East Asian descent.

Yoon placed third among four candidates in the September 22nd primary, receiving 21.16% of the vote. Only the top two finishers advance to the general election. After the election, second-place finisher Michael Flaherty and Yoon announced they had teamed up with Yoon becoming an unofficial running mate to Flaherty, with Flaherty promising to appoint Yoon "deputy mayor" if he won. The City of Boston government charter does not officially include a position of deputy mayor. What Yoon as deputy mayor might have done, including how he might have been paid, was never officially announced. Critics charged that this was a cheap political move by Flaherty designed to bring in minority and other voters that might not otherwise vote in the general election. Others praised it as a savvy strategic decision to bring more inclusiveness to City Hall.

Michael Flaherty and his unofficial running mate Sam Yoon went on to lose to incumbent Mayor Thomas Menino in the November 3 general election with 42.43% to Menino's 57.27%.

== Subsequent career ==
After his defeat, Yoon said that the Boston establishment shut him out, and he was unable to find work. He announced his decision to leave Boston for Washington, D.C., on June 29, 2010. In Washington, he briefly served as a senior policy advisor in the Department of Labor. He was previously executive director of National Alliance of Community Economic Development Associations (NACEDA), and was appointed in 2012 as the first full-time Executive Director of the Council of Korean Americans (CKA).

== Asian Political Leadership Fund ==
Yoon is a co-founder of the Asian Political Leadership Fund, a federally designated 527 group whose purpose is to promote political leadership from within the Asian-American community.

== Personal life ==
Yoon and his wife live in the Washington, D.C., area with their children. He currently teaches math at Yorktown High School in Arlington, VA
