= 2003 Boston City Council election =

- November 4, 2003

Boston City Council elections were held on November 4, 2003. Nine seats (five representatives and four at-large members) were contested in the general election, as the incumbents for districts 2, 3, 5, and 7 ran unopposed. Six seats (the four at-large positions, plus districts 4 and 6) had also been contested in the preliminary election held on September 23, 2003.

== At-large ==
Councillors Michael F. Flaherty, Felix D. Arroyo, Maura Hennigan, and Stephen J. Murphy were re-elected. Patricia H. White, daughter of former Mayor of Boston Kevin White, was an unsuccessful candidate in this election.

Candidates	Preliminary Election		General Election	
Candidates	Votes	%	Votes	%
Michael F. Flaherty	20,307	18.21%	36,387	18.33%
Felix D. Arroyo	14,379	12.89%	34,685	17.48%
Maura Hennigan	15,916	14.27%	33,596	16.93%
Stephen J. Murphy	17,597	15.78%	30,510	15.37%
Patricia H. White	16,439	14.74%	29,649	14.94%
Matt O'Malley	7,025	6.30%	12,929	6.51%
Althea Garrison	5,050	4.53%	10,524	5.30%
Roy Owens	4,356	3.91%	10,204	5.14%
Jacquelyne Payne-Thompson	2,723	2.44%		
Phyllis Yetman Igoe	1,940	1.74%		
Edward Puglielli	1,705	1.53%		
Laura Garza	1,604	1.44%		
Arthur "Lucky" Craffey	1,594	1.43%		
Joseph Anthony Ureneck	907	0.81%		

== District 1 ==
Councillor Paul Scapicchio was re-elected.

Candidates	General Election	
Candidates	Votes	%
Paul Scapicchio	4,646	85.88%
Ken Fowler	764	14.12%

== District 2 ==
Councillor James M. Kelly ran unopposed and was re-elected.

== District 3 ==
Councillor Maureen Feeney ran unopposed and was re-elected.

== District 4 ==
Councillor Charles Yancey was re-elected.

Candidates	Preliminary election		General election	
Candidates	Votes	%	Votes	%
Charles Yancey	1,901	54.36%	3,679	55.17%
Ego E. Ezedi Jr.	1,544	44.15%	2,990	44.83%
Arthur L. Sutton	52	1.49%		

== District 5 ==
Councillor Robert Consalvo ran unopposed and was re-elected.

== District 6 ==
Councillor John M. Tobin Jr. was re-elected.

Candidates	Preliminary Election		General Election	
Candidates	Votes	%	Votes	%
John M. Tobin Jr.	5,463	77.90%	8,473	74.21%
Francesca E. Fordiani	1,344	19.16%	2,945	25.79%
Wayne A. Sallale	206	2.94%		

== District 7 ==
Councillor Chuck Turner ran unopposed and was re-elected.

== District 8 ==
Councillor Michael P. Ross was re-elected.

Candidates	General Election	
Candidates	Votes	%
Michael P. Ross	3,418	81.36%
Carmen M. Torre	783	18.64%

== District 9 ==
Councillor Jerry P. McDermott was re-elected.

Candidates	General Election	
Candidates	Votes	%
Jerry P. McDermott	3,467	82.31%
Daniel Kontoff	745	17.69%

== See also ==
- List of members of the Boston City Council
