= 2015 Boston City Council election =

- November 3, 2015

Boston City Council elections were held on November 3, 2015. Eight seats (four district representatives and four at-large members) were contested in the general election, as the incumbents in districts 1, 2, 6, 8, and 9 were unopposed. Two seats (districts 4 and 7) had also been contested in the preliminary election held on September 8, 2015.

== At-large ==
Councillors Ayanna Pressley, Michelle Wu, and Michael F. Flaherty were re-elected, while Councillor Stephen J. Murphy lost his seat to Annissa Essaibi George.

Candidates	General election	
Candidates	Votes	%
Ayanna Pressley	31,783	24.21%
Michelle Wu	28,908	22.02%
Michael F. Flaherty	26,473	20.16%
Annissa Essaibi George	23,447	17.86%
Stephen J. Murphy	19,546	14.89%
Jovan J. Lacet	95†	0.07%
Charles Yancey	39†	0.03%
Jean-Claude Sanon	25†	0.02%
Andrea Campbell	13†	0.01%
all others	959	0.73%

† write-in votes

== District 1 ==
Councillor Salvatore LaMattina ran unopposed and was re-elected.

Candidates	General election	
Candidates	Votes	%
Salvatore LaMattina	3,142	95.41%
all others	151	4.59%

== District 2 ==
Councillor Bill Linehan ran unopposed and was re-elected.

Candidates	General election	
Candidates	Votes	%
Bill Linehan	3,594	89.25%
Suzanne Lee	26†	0.65%
all others	407	10.11%

† write-in votes

== District 3 ==
Councillor Frank Baker was re-elected.

Candidates	General election	
Candidates	Votes	%
Frank Baker	4,745	84.88%
Donnie Palmer	811	14.51%
all others	34	0.61%

== District 4 ==
Councillor Charles Yancey was defeated by Andrea Campbell.

Candidates	Preliminary election		General election	
Candidates	Votes	%	Votes	%
Andrea Campbell	1,982	57.92%	4,311	61.32%
Charles Yancey	1,159	33.87%	2,701	38.42%
Terrance J. Williams	217	6.34%		
Jovan J. Lacet	60	1.75%		
all others	4	0.12%	18	0.26%

== District 5 ==
Councillor Timothy McCarthy was re-elected.

Candidates	General election	
Candidates	Votes	%
Timothy McCarthy	4,836	63.99%
Jean-Claude Sanon	2,690	35.59%
all others	32	0.42%

== District 6 ==
Councillor Matt O'Malley ran unopposed and was re-elected.

Candidates	General election	
Candidates	Votes	%
Matt O'Malley	6,658	97.75%
all others	153	2.25%

== District 7 ==
Councillor Tito Jackson was re-elected.

Candidates	Preliminary election		General election	
Candidates	Votes	%	Votes	%
Tito Jackson	1,409	66.40%	2,983	66.64%
Charles L. Clemons Jr.	381	17.95%	1,444	32.26%
Haywood Fennell Sr.	104	4.90%		
Althea Garrison	98	4.62%	16†	0.36%
Roy Owens	74	3.49%		
Kevin A. Dwire	34	1.60%		
all others	22	1.04%	33	0.74%

† write-in votes

== District 8 ==
Councillor Josh Zakim ran unopposed and was re-elected.

Candidates	General election	
Candidates	Votes	%
Josh Zakim	2,055	97.90%
all others	44	2.10%

== District 9 ==
Councillor Mark Ciommo ran unopposed and was re-elected.

Candidates	General election	
Candidates	Votes	%
Mark Ciommo	2,237	96.24%
all others	85	3.66%

== See also ==
- List of members of the Boston City Council
