= 2007 Boston City Council election =

- November 6, 2007

Boston City Council elections were held on November 6, 2007. Eight seats (four district representatives and four at-large members) were contested in the general election, as the incumbents in districts 1, 2, 5, 6, and 8 were unopposed. Two seats (districts 7 and 9) had also been contested in the preliminary election held on September 25, 2007.

== At-large ==
Councillors Michael F. Flaherty, Stephen J. Murphy, and Sam Yoon were re-elected, while incumbent Felix D. Arroyo was beaten for the final seat by John R. Connolly.

Candidates	General Election	
Candidates	Votes	%
Michael F. Flaherty	25,863	20.57%
Stephen J. Murphy	23,659	18.82%
Sam Yoon	23,230	18.48%
John R. Connolly	21,997	17.50%
Felix D. Arroyo	18,579	14.78%
Martin J. Hogan	4,008	3.19%
Matthew Geary	3,030	2.41%
William P. Estrada	2,439	1.94%
David James Wyatt	2,383	1.90%
all others	542	0.43%

== District 1 ==
Councillor Salvatore LaMattina ran unopposed and was re-elected.

Candidates	General Election	
Candidates	Votes	%
Salvatore LaMattina	2,848	95.80%
all others	125	4.20%

== District 2 ==
Councillor Bill Linehan ran unopposed and was re-elected.

Candidates	General Election	
Candidates	Votes	%
Bill Linehan	3,916	95.68%
all others	177	4.32%

== District 3 ==
Councillor Maureen Feeney was re-elected.

Candidates	General Election	
Candidates	Votes	%
Maureen Feeney	4,361	82.92%
Michael J. Cote	869	16.52%
all others	29	0.55%

== District 4 ==
Councillor Charles Yancey was re-elected.

Candidates	General Election	
Candidates	Votes	%
Charles Yancey	2,559	89.01%
J. R. Rucker	308	10.71%
all others	8	0.28%

== District 5 ==
Councillor Robert Consalvo ran unopposed and was re-elected.

Candidates	General Election	
Candidates	Votes	%
Robert Consalvo	4,621	98.49%
all others	71	1.51%

== District 6 ==
Councillor John M. Tobin Jr. ran unopposed and was re-elected.

Candidates	General Election	
Candidates	Votes	%
John M. Tobin Jr.	5,904	97.85%
all others	130	2.15%

== District 7 ==
Councillor Chuck Turner was re-elected.

Candidates	Preliminary Election		General Election	
Candidates	Votes	%	Votes	%
Chuck Turner	1,476	75.73%	3,258	81.13%
Carlos Henriquez	317	16.26%	728	18.13%
Althea Garrison	151	7.75%	17†	0.42%
all others	5	0.26%	13	0.32%

† write-in votes

== District 8 ==
Councillor Michael P. Ross ran unopposed and was re-elected.

Candidates	General Election	
Candidates	Votes	%
Michael P. Ross	2,035	97.14%
all others	60	2.86%

== District 9 ==
The seat formerly held by Jerry P. McDermott was won by Mark Ciommo. McDermott had announced in May 2007 that he would not seek re-election.

Candidates	Preliminary Election		General Election	
Candidates	Votes	%	Votes	%
Mark Ciommo	1,407	31.11%	2,838	59.80%
Gregory J. Glennon	1,250	27.64%	1,889	39.80%
Timothy N. Schofield	965	21.34%		
Rosie Hanlon	577	12.76%		
Alessandro Selvig	293	6.48%		
James Joseph Jenner	28	0.62%		
all others	3	0.07%	19	0.40%

== See also ==
- List of members of the Boston City Council
