= Felix G. Arroyo =

American politician (born 1979)

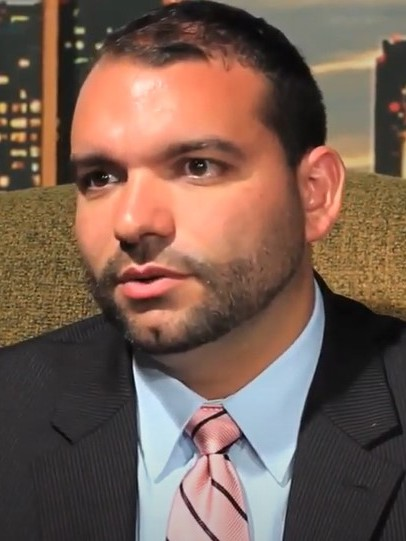
- Arroyo in 2013

Chief of Health and Human Services, Boston
- In office January 2014 – August 2017
- Preceded by: Daphne Griffin
- Succeeded by: Marty Martinez

Member of the Boston City Council at-large
- In office January 2010 – January 2014
- Preceded by: Michael F. Flaherty and Sam Yoon
- Succeeded by: Michael F. Flaherty and Michelle Wu

Personal details
- Born: May 25, 1979 (age 47) Boston, Massachusetts, U.S.
- Party: Democratic
- Relations: Felix D. Arroyo (father); Ricardo Arroyo (brother)
- Education: University of Massachusetts Boston; Southern New Hampshire University
- Website: Campaign website

Felix G. Arroyo (born May 25, 1979) is an American political figure from Boston. Arroyo was elected to an at-large seat on the Boston City Council in November 2009, and re-elected in November 2011, serving for two terms before unsuccessfully running for Mayor of Boston in 2013. He subsequently served as the city's Chief of Health and Human Services from 2014 until his dismissal in 2017 following an investigation into sexual harassment allegations.

== Early life ==
Arroyo is the son of former Boston City Councilor Felix D. Arroyo. He attended Boston public schools and is a graduate of University of Massachusetts Boston. He also earned a master's degree from Southern New Hampshire University. Prior to being elected to the Boston City Council, Arroyo served as a field director at Northeast Action and Political Director for the Service Employees International Union Local 615.

== Political career ==
When he was twenty, Arroyo started working as the director of constituent services for Boston City Councilor Chuck Turner.

=== Boston City Council ===
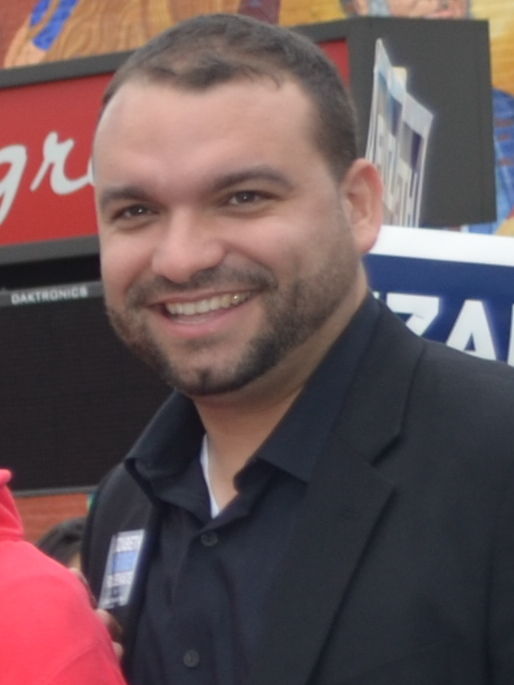
Arroyo in 2012

Arroyo was an at-large member of the Boston City Council from January 2010 to January 2014. During his time on the City Council, he developed legislation called "Invest in Boston" to invest Boston's money in banks that invest in Boston to help promote economic development. He led the effort on the council to save thousands of youth summer jobs and prevent the closures of libraries. In partnership with fellow councilor Michael P. Ross, Arroyo attempted to have the city to cancel contracts with companies based in the state of Arizona after Arizona adopted Arizona SB 1070 in 2010. Arroyo did not seek reelection to the council in 2013, instead seeking election as mayor.

=== Mayoral run ===
In April 2013, Arroyo announced his candidacy for the Boston mayoral election. He officially kicked off his campaign on June 15, at Villa Victoria. Arroyo lost in the September preliminary election, having received 9,888 votes and finishing fifth in a field of 12, where the top two vote-getters advance to the November general election.

After being eliminated, he endorsed Marty Walsh in the general election.

=== Chief of Health and Human Services ===
In January 2014, Mayor Marty Walsh named Arroyo as the Chief of Health and Human Services for Boston. Arroyo was the first Cabinet-level position announced by the newly elected mayor. Walsh cited Arroyo's ability to bring people together and work collaboratively, as well as his understanding of the importance of addressing the needs of Boston's most vulnerable population.

==== Sexual harassment investigation and litigation ====
On July 28, 2017, Arroyo was placed on paid administrative leave from his position at the Boston Department of Health. On August 24, 2017, a spokesperson for Mayor Walsh announced that Arroyo had been fired after a "comprehensive investigation" into sexual harassment allegations. Arroyo's accuser initially filed a complaint with the Massachusetts Commission Against Discrimination (MCAD); that complaint was withdrawn in November 2017, in lieu of a civil suit against Arroyo and the City of Boston filed in March 2018. In August 2020, Arroyo filed suit against the City of Boston and Mayor Walsh alleging breach of contract, negligence, and defamation. A May 2024 trial scheduled for the civil suit brought by Arroyo's accuser was not held due to the parties reaching an agreement—in July 2024, The Boston Globe reported that the City of Boston had agreed to a $1 million settlement with Arroyo's accuser in exchange for litigation being dropped. A defamation countersuit filed by Arroyo against his accuser was not affected, and is scheduled for trial in June 2025.

== Personal life ==
Arroyo is a lifelong Bostonian, born in the South End, raised in Hyde Park, and a graduate of the Boston Public Schools. He lives in the Jamaica Plain neighborhood of Boston. In addition to his father having previously served on the Boston City Council as an at-large member, his brother Ricardo Arroyo was the councillor for District 5 from January 2020 to January 2024. As of November 2020, Arroyo's LinkedIn profile listed his occupation as Chief Operating Officer at El Mundo Boston, a Latino media outlet.

== Electoral history ==
=== City Council ===
2009 Boston City Council at-large election
Candidates	Preliminary Election		General Election	
Candidates	Votes	%	Votes	%
John R. Connolly (incumbent)	35,182	18.08%	51,362	18.35%
Stephen J. Murphy (incumbent)	30,365	15.61%	51,008	18.22%
Felix G. Arroyo	25,859	13.29%	45,144	16.13%
Ayanna Pressley	16,866	8.67%	41,879	14.96%
Tito Jackson	12,535	6.44%	30,203	10.79%
Andrew Kenneally	12,653	6.50%	24,249	8.66%
Tomás González	10,122	5.20%	18,310	6.54%
Doug Bennett	10,529	5.41%	16,842	6.02%
Ego Ezedi	9,260	4.76%		
Hiep Quoc Nguyen	7,691	3.95%		
Sean H. Ryan	6,665	3.43%		
Jean-Claude Sanon	5,386	2.77%		
Robert Fortes	5,071	2.61%		
Bill Trabucco	3,132	1.61%		
Scotland Willis	2,639	1.36%		
all others	595	0.31%	951	0.34%

2011 Boston City Council at-large election
Candidates	General Election	
Candidates	Votes	%
Ayanna Pressley (incumbent)	37,532	21.42%
Felix G. Arroyo (incumbent)	35,483	20.25%
John R. Connolly (incumbent)	32,827	18.74%
Stephen J. Murphy (incumbent)	26,730	15.26%
Michael F. Flaherty	25,805	14.73%
Will Dorcena	8,739	4.99%
Sean H. Ryan	7,376	4.21%
Althea Garrison (write-in)	19	0.01%
Deshon Porter (write-in)	2	0.00%
William B. Feegbeh (write-in)	1	0.00%
all others	666	0.39%

=== Mayor ===
2013 Boston mayoral election
Candidate	Primary election		General election	
Candidate	Votes	%	Votes	%
Marty Walsh	20,854	18.47	72,583	51.54
John R. Connolly	19,435	17.21	67,694	48.07
Charlotte Golar Richie	15,546	13.77		
Daniel F. Conley	12,775	11.32		
Felix G. Arroyo	9,895	8.76		
John Barros	9,148	8.10		
Robert Consalvo	8,603	7.62		
Michael P. Ross	8,164	7.23		
Bill Walczak	3,825	3.39		
Charles Yancey	2,389	2.12		
Charles Clemons	1,800	1.59		
David Wyatt	334	0.30		
Write-ins	130	0.12	560	0.40
Total	112,898	100	140,837	100
