= 2009 Boston City Council election =

- November 3, 2009

Boston City Council elections were held on November 3, 2009. Eight seats (four district representatives and four at-large members) were contested in the general election, as the incumbents in districts 2, 3, 4, 5, and 6 were unopposed. Seven seats (the four at-large members, and districts 1, 7, and 9) had also been contested in the preliminary election held on September 22, 2009.

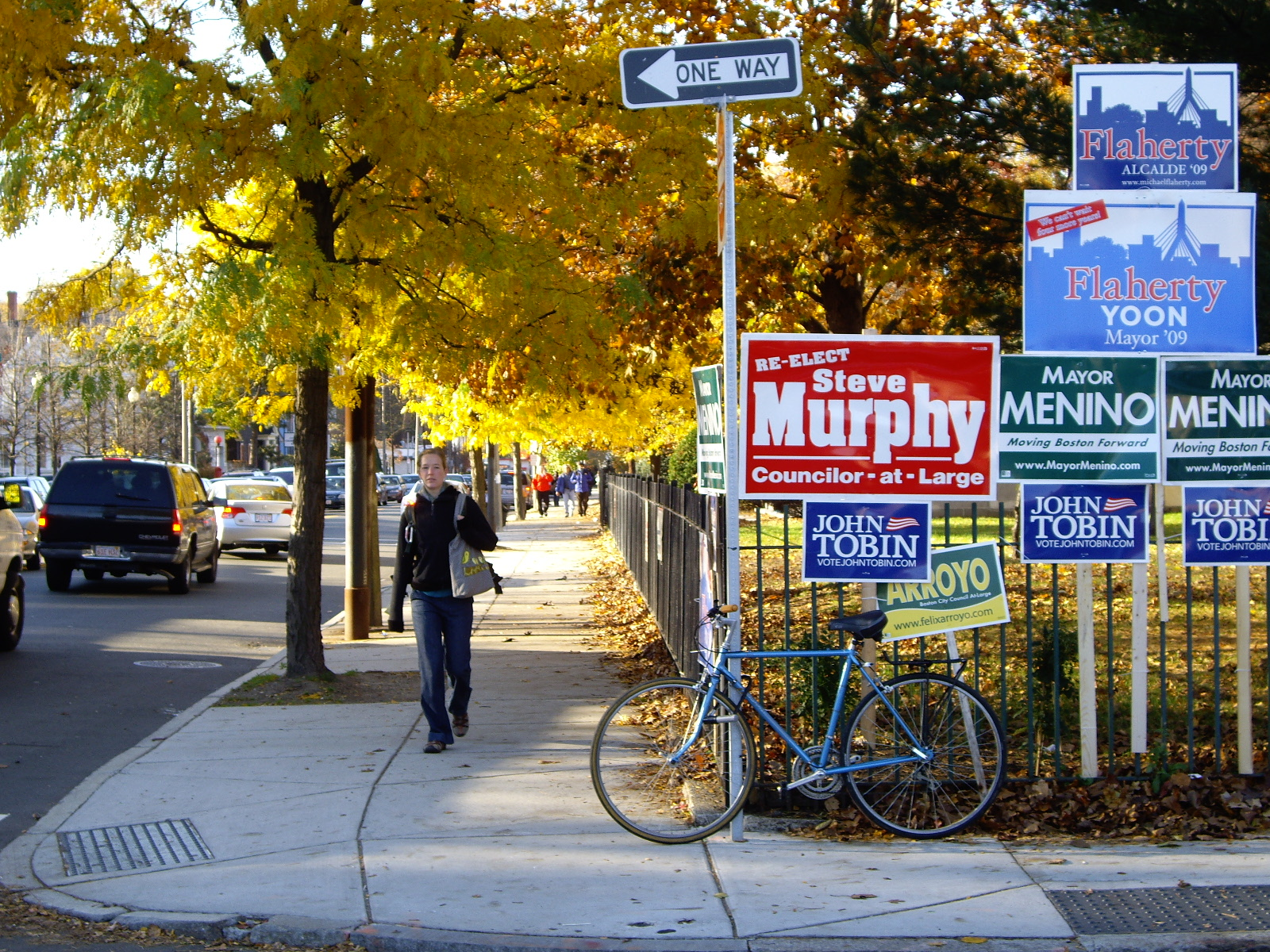
Election day, Boston, November 3, 2009

== At-large ==
Councillors John R. Connolly and Stephen J. Murphy were re-elected to their at-large seats. Incumbents Michael F. Flaherty and Sam Yoon did not run for re-election, as they were running for mayor of Boston; their seats were won by Felix G. Arroyo and Ayanna Pressley. Pressley's victory made her first woman of color to be elected to the council in its history.

Candidates	Preliminary election		General election	
Candidates	Votes	%	Votes	%
John R. Connolly (incumbent)	35,182	18.08%	51,362	18.35%
Stephen J. Murphy (incumbent)	30,365	15.61%	51,008	18.22%
Felix G. Arroyo	25,859	13.29%	45,144	16.13%
Ayanna Pressley	16,866	8.67%	41,879	14.96%
Tito Jackson	12,535	6.44%	30,203	10.79%
Andrew Kenneally	12,653	6.50%	24,249	8.66%
Tomás González	10,122	5.20%	18,310	6.54%
Doug Bennett	10,529	5.41%	16,842	6.02%
Ego Ezedi	9,260	4.76%		
Hiep Quoc Nguyen	7,691	3.95%		
Sean H. Ryan	6,665	3.43%		
Jean-Claude Sanon	5,386	2.77%		
Robert Fortes	5,071	2.61%		
Bill Trabucco	3,132	1.61%		
Scotland Willis	2,639	1.36%		
all others	595	0.31%	951	0.34%

== District 1 ==
Councillor Salvatore LaMattina was re-elected.

Candidates	Preliminary election		General election	
Candidates	Votes	%	Votes	%
Salvatore LaMattina (incumbent)	5,599	73.37%	8,111	76.58%
Chris Kulikoski	1,149	15.06%	2,444	23.07%
Laura Garza	854	11.19%		

== District 2 ==
Councillor Bill Linehan ran unopposed.

== District 3 ==
Councillor Maureen Feeney ran unopposed.

== District 4 ==
Councillor Charles Yancey ran unopposed.

== District 5 ==
Councillor Robert Consalvo ran unopposed.

== District 6 ==
=== General election ===
Councillor John M. Tobin, Jr. ran unopposed.

=== Special election ===
In August 2010, Tobin resigned his seat to take a position as vice president for city and community affairs at Northeastern University. The seat was filled via a special election on November 16, 2010, with the preliminary election on October 19, 2010. Matt O'Malley was elected to serve the remainder of Tobin's term, defeating James W. Hennigan III, brother of former council member Maura Hennigan.

Candidates	Special prelim. election		Special gen. election	
Candidates	Votes	%	Votes	%
Matt O'Malley	3,830	53.16%	5,283	59.97%
James W. Hennigan III	2,197	30.50%	3,487	39.58%
Sean H. Ryan	613	8.51%		
Kosta Demos	350	4.86%		
Chun-Fai Chan	196	2.72%		
all others	18	0.25%	40	0.45%

== District 7 ==
=== General election ===
Councillor Chuck Turner was re-elected.

Candidates	Preliminary election		General election	
Candidates	Votes	%	Votes	%
Chuck Turner (incumbent)	3,648	52.57%	5,521	59.83%
Carlos Henriquez	1,659	23.91%	3,644	39.49%
Althea Garrison	995	14.34%		
Roy Owens	610	8.79%		

=== Special election ===
On December 1, 2010, Turner was expelled by an 11–1 vote, following his corruption conviction, making him the first councillor to be expelled in the history of the modern Boston City Council. This created a vacancy that needed to be filled by a special election, which took place on March 15, 2011, with the preliminary election on February 15, 2011. Tito Jackson was elected to serve the remainder of Turner's term.

Candidates	Special prelim. election		Special gen. election	
Candidates	Votes	%	Votes	%
Tito Jackson	1,944	67.38%	2,829	81.98%
Cornell Mills	271	9.39%	557	16.14%
Daneille Renee Williams	258	8.94%		
Althea Garrison	150	5.20%		
Natalie Carithers	96	3.33%		
Roy Owens	89	3.08%		

== District 8 ==
Councillor Michael P. Ross was re-elected.

Candidates	General election	
	Votes	%
Michael P. Ross (incumbent)	5,331	84.10%
Oscar Brookins	981	15.48%

== District 9 ==
Councillor Mark Ciommo was re-elected.

Candidates	Preliminary election		General election	
Candidates	Votes	%	Votes	%
Mark Ciommo (incumbent)	3,495	59.78%	4,849	64.31%
Alex Selvig	1,353	23.14%	2,678	35.42%
Abigail Furey	785	13.43%		
Benjamin Ian Narodick	188	3.22%		

== See also ==
- List of members of the Boston City Council
- 2009 Boston mayoral election
