= Timothy McCarthy (politician) =

American politician

Member of the Boston City Council from the 5th district
- In office January 2014 – January 2020
- Preceded by: Robert Consalvo
- Succeeded by: Ricardo Arroyo

Personal details
- Party: Democratic
- Education: Tufts University; Curry College (BA); Suffolk University (MA)

Timothy McCarthy is a former Boston City Councilor who represented District 5 (Mattapan, Hyde Park, and Roslindale). A Democrat, he was first elected in 2013. In January 2019, he announced that he would not be running for re-election.

== Biography ==
McCarthy graduated from Catholic Memorial High School, Curry College and the Harvard Business School Program for Management Development. He attended Tufts University for a year before transferring to Curry’s continuing education program. He earned a Master’s Degree in public administration at Suffolk University. He lives in Hyde Park, Boston with his wife, Maureen. They have two sons.

== City Council ==
McCarthy was one of three councilors who voted against the Jim Brooks Stabilization Act. Ultimately defeated in the State House, it sought "to require landlords to inform tenants of their rights in the case of an eviction, and to notify the city as well."

After the 2019 Straight Pride Parade in Boston (hosted by Super Happy Fun America), McCarthy proposed a ban on face masks as a public safety measure. Some councilors expressed concern about McCarthy's proposal, including Josh Zakim who noted a potential for selective enforcement. The council agreed to allow hearings to be held on the proposed ordinance.

McCarthy opposed the legalization of recreational marijuana.
