= Mark Ciommo =

Politician in Boston, United States

- Ciommo in 2018

Member of the Boston City Council from the 9th district
- In office January 2008 – January 2020
- Preceded by: Jerry McDermott
- Succeeded by: Liz Breadon

Personal details
- Born: November 19, 1956 (age 69) Boston, Massachusetts
- Party: Democratic
- Education: Suffolk University
- Website: markciommo.com

Mark Ciommo (born November 19, 1956) is an American teacher and politician, who formerly served as a member of the Boston City Council representing District 9 (Allston–Brighton).

== Early years ==
Ciommo was raised in Allston-Brighton by Louise Rufo, a single mother. He was the first of his family to attend college, earning a B.S. from Suffolk University.

== Career ==
Before running for office, Ciommo worked as a teacher for at-risk youths and as Assistant Director of the Jackson Mann Community Center, and was Executive Director of the Veronica B. Smith Multi-Service Senior Center in Brighton for 14 years.

Ciommo ran for the District 9 seat on the Boston City Council in 2002, in a special election following the death of councilor Brian Honan, but lost to Jerry McDermott. Ciommo was elected to the council in November 2007. With endorsement from The Boston Globe, he defeated Greg Glennon to fill the council position vacated by McDermott. Ciommo was re-elected in November 2009, November 2011 (unopposed), November 2013, November 2015 (unopposed), and November 2017.

Ciommo sought to be voted by his fellow councilors to serve as council president in January 2016, but withdrew ahead of the vote. Michelle Wu was elected unanimously.

Ciommo served on the council as Chair of the Ways and Means Committee. During his tenure, Boston maintained a AAA bond credit rating from Standard & Poor's throughout the economic recession and recovery. Another area of focus was safe housing for students. On April 2, 2019, Ciommo announced that he would not seek re-election in November 2019.

== Personal life ==
Ciommo lives with his wife, Laura, in Allston–Brighton. They have two sons, Michael and Matthew.
