= Salvatore LaMattina =

American politician

Sal LaMattina

Member of the Boston City Council from the 1st district
- In office January 2006 – January 2018
- Preceded by: Paul Scapicchio
- Succeeded by: Lydia Edwards

Boston City Council Vice President
- In office January 2011 – December 2013

Personal details
- Born: September 8, 1959 (age 67) East Boston, Massachusetts
- Party: Democratic
- Spouse: Lisa LaMattina
- Education: University of Massachusetts Amherst

Salvatore "Sal" J. LaMattina (born September 8, 1959, in East Boston) is an American politician who is a former member of the Boston City Council. He represented District 1, which includes the North End, East Boston, and Charlestown, serving from January 2006 through December 2017.

== Early life and education ==
LaMattina grew up in the East Boston neighborhood of Boston. He graduated from East Boston High School in 1978 and then attended University of Massachusetts Amherst, where he graduated in 1984 with a degree in political science.

LaMattia has three brothers, Robert, David, and John.

Prior to being elected to the Boston City Council, LaMattina worked in the administration of Mayor Thomas Menino in the Mayor's Office of Neighborhood Services as a liaison to the North End and East Boson neighborhoods. La Mattina also founded the "Eastie Pride Day" celebration.

== City Council ==
LaMattina served six terms on the Boston City Council from January 2006 to January 2018, representing the council's 1st district.

While on the city council, LaMattina also chaired the Ward 1 Democratic Committee.

== See also ==
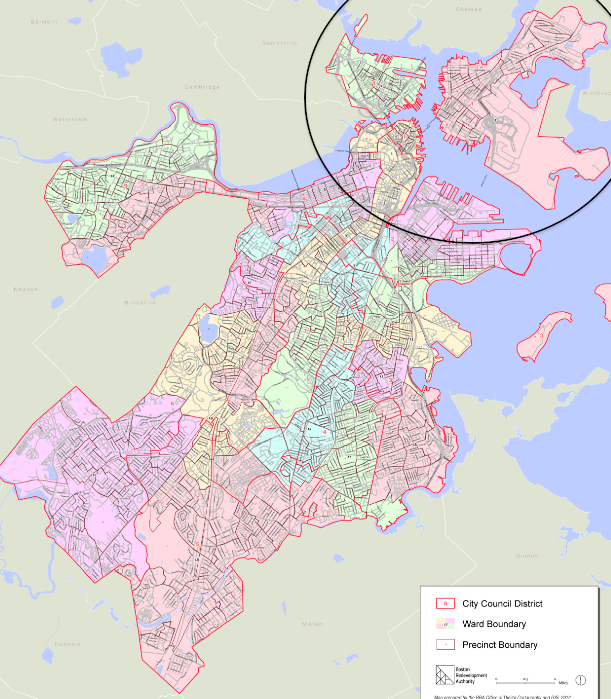
Map showing Boston City Council District 1, 2012, represented by LaMattina

- Boston City Council election, 2005
- Boston City Council election, 2007
- Boston City Council election, 2009
- Boston City Council election, 2011
- Boston City Council election, 2013
- Boston City Council election, 2015
