= Hispanic Office of Planning and Evaluation =

US Latino focused government entity

The Hispanic Office of Planning and Evaluation (HOPE) was a statewide, community based, nonprofit organization with regional offices in Boston, Lawrence, and Springfield, Massachusetts. Established in 1971, HOPE was incorporated in the Commonwealth of Massachusetts in 1973 to advocate, develop, facilitate, coordinate, and evaluate educational, health and human services, and community development programs for the Latino community of Massachusetts. HOPE existed to improve the quality of life and to increase the number and range of opportunities for Latinos to succeed as productive members of their families, workplaces, neighborhoods, communities, and society. HOPE worked to accomplish these goals through three complementary approaches: program services, community support resources, and leadership development and advocacy planning. In December 2011, HOPE declared Chapter 7 bankruptcy, closing its doors after 40 years of service to the Latino community.
