= Chuck Turner =

American politician and activist (1940–2019)

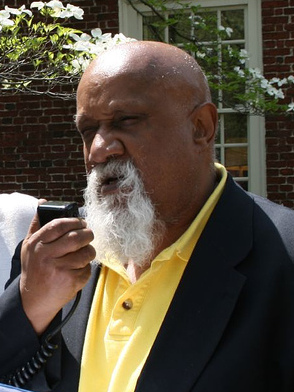
- Turner in 2007

Member of the Boston City Council from the 7th District
- In office 1999–2010
- Preceded by: Gareth R. Saunders
- Succeeded by: Tito Jackson

Personal details
- Born: June 10, 1940 Cincinnati, Ohio
- Died: December 25, 2019 (aged 79)
- Party: Green-Rainbow Party
- Education: Harvard University
- Occupation: Activist, politician

Charles Turner (June 10, 1940 – December 25, 2019) was an American politician and activist, who served on the Boston City Council representing District 7. Turner was a member of the Green-Rainbow Party Massachusetts affiliate to the national Green Party. In 2010, Turner was convicted of accepting a bribe and sentenced to three years in prison; he was expelled from the city council.

== Education and career as activist ==
A native of Cincinnati, Ohio, Turner graduated from Harvard University with a Bachelor of Arts degree in government in 1963. He became a community organizer in Boston's South End in 1966, becoming an advocate for public housing and affordable housing. He founded the Boston Jobs Council, which pressed to reserve a portion of public jobs in Boston for Boston residents, a bid to increase the number of black and Latino construction workers in the city.

== Boston City Council ==
In November 1999, Turner was elected to the Boston City Council as the member for District 7, which encompasses the neighborhoods of Roxbury and Lower Roxbury, as well as parts of the Fenway, South End, and Dorchester. Turner won his seat by a 693-vote margin against the city's director of youth services, who was the preferred candidate of Mayor Tom Menino.

Turner had a volatile tenure on the council, and was known for "outspoken actions and often abrasive personality." In February 2004, angry at being removed from the Education Committee, he compared City Council President Michael F. Flaherty to Louise Day Hicks, an opponent of the city's desegregation busing. He had also accused limits placed on debate as being "institutional racism".

In November 2001 and November 2007, Turner won over 80% of the vote in his re-election bids; he ran unopposed in November 2003 and November 2005. He was more closely challenged in November 2009, defeating Carlos Henriquez by approximately a 60% to 40% margin.

In 2002, he authored an ordinance protecting transgender persons from discrimination that was overwhelmingly approved by the council and signed into law. When Governor Mitt Romney tried to end the state's affirmative action guidelines, Turner became one of its aggressive critics, helping to lead the governor stop the change.

In April 2004, Turner was quoted by the Boston Herald as saying that Condoleezza Rice working for George W. Bush was "similar in my mind to a Jewish person working for Hitler in the 1930s."

In May 2004, Turner and activist Sadiki Kambon held a press conference to reveal photos purportedly showing U.S. soldiers raping Iraqi women. The Boston Globe "questioned the legitimacy of the photos, which were then proven to be bogus." Turner was subjected to wide criticism from conservative media and was censured by six members of the city council. Turner was unrepentant, noting that he had urged the media to confirm the photos’ authenticity before disseminating them.

During the 2008 Green Party presidential primaries, Turner gave his endorsement to the presidential candidacy of Cynthia McKinney.

=== Public corruption conviction ===
On August 3, 2007, Turner was videotaped by FBI informant Ronald Wilburn, accepting $1,000 cash from Wilburn in Turner's district office in exchange for pushing for a liquor license for the Roxbury nightclub Dejavu. On November 22, 2008, Turner was arrested and charged with attempted extortion under color of official right.

On December 9, 2008, Turner was indicted by a federal grand jury on three charges of making false statements and a charge of conspiracy with former State Senator Dianne Wilkerson, all stemming from an FBI public corruption investigation. Turner was found guilty of the false statement and bribery charges by a jury on October 29, 2010.

Turner has claimed that he and Wilkerson are victims of a government conspiracy against African-American officials.

On January 25, 2011, Turner was sentenced to three years in prison. In imposing the sentence, U.S. District Judge Douglas P. Woodlock said that he imposed a long prison term because Turner, in addition to accepting the bribe, had made false statements to the FBI and "ludicrously perjurious testimony" that he could not recall accepting a package of cash.

Turner was held at the federal prison in Hazelton, West Virginia. He was released early for good behavior in July 2013, after serving 28 months.

=== Expulsion from City Council ===
On December 1, 2010, Turner was expelled from the Boston City Council by an 11–1 vote, making him the first Boston City Council member in modern history to be expelled from the council. Turner and fifteen of his constituents then sued the council, arguing that it had overstepped its authority and seeking back pay for Turner, and in 2012, the Massachusetts Supreme Judicial Court ruled that the council lacked the power to expel a member, prompting calls from City Council President Stephen J. Murphy, who supported Turner's expulsion, to amend the city charter. In 2013, the city agreed to pay $106,000 to Turner to settle the case.

== Death ==
On December 25, 2019, Turner died of cancer at the age of 79.
