= Josh Zakim =

American lawyer

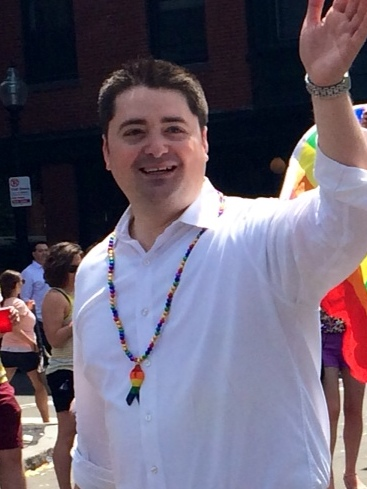
- Zakim in 2015

Member of the Boston City Council from the 8th district
- In office January 2014 – January 2020
- Preceded by: Mike Ross
- Succeeded by: Kenzie Bok

Personal details
- Born: December 16, 1983 (age 42) Newton, Massachusetts, U.S.
- Party: Democratic
- Spouse: Grace Sullivan Rosenthal (2016–present)
- Education: University of Pennsylvania (BA); Northeastern University (JD)
- Website: Official website

Josh Zakim (born December 16, 1983) is an American politician, attorney, and community activist from Boston. He formerly served on the Boston City Council representing District 8, which includes Boston's Back Bay, Beacon Hill, Fenway–Kenmore, Mission Hill, and West End neighborhoods.

== Family ==
Zakim is the son of Lenny and Joyce Zakim. He grew up in Newton, Massachusetts, with his two younger sisters, Deena and Shari. Zakim's father was a Jewish-American religious and civil rights leader in Boston.

Zakim is an active Board Member of the Lenny Zakim Fund. Founded in 1995 by his father and his activist friends, the Fund gives small grants to support local grassroots organizations seeking to address complex social issues such as youth violence, adult literacy, and job training.

== Education ==
Zakim attended high school at Buckingham Browne & Nichols in Cambridge, Massachusetts. He graduated with a Bachelor of Arts degree in Political Science from the University of Pennsylvania, and went on to receive his Juris Doctor degree from the Northeastern University School of Law. He was sworn into the Bar of the Commonwealth of Massachusetts on December 2, 2009.

== Career ==
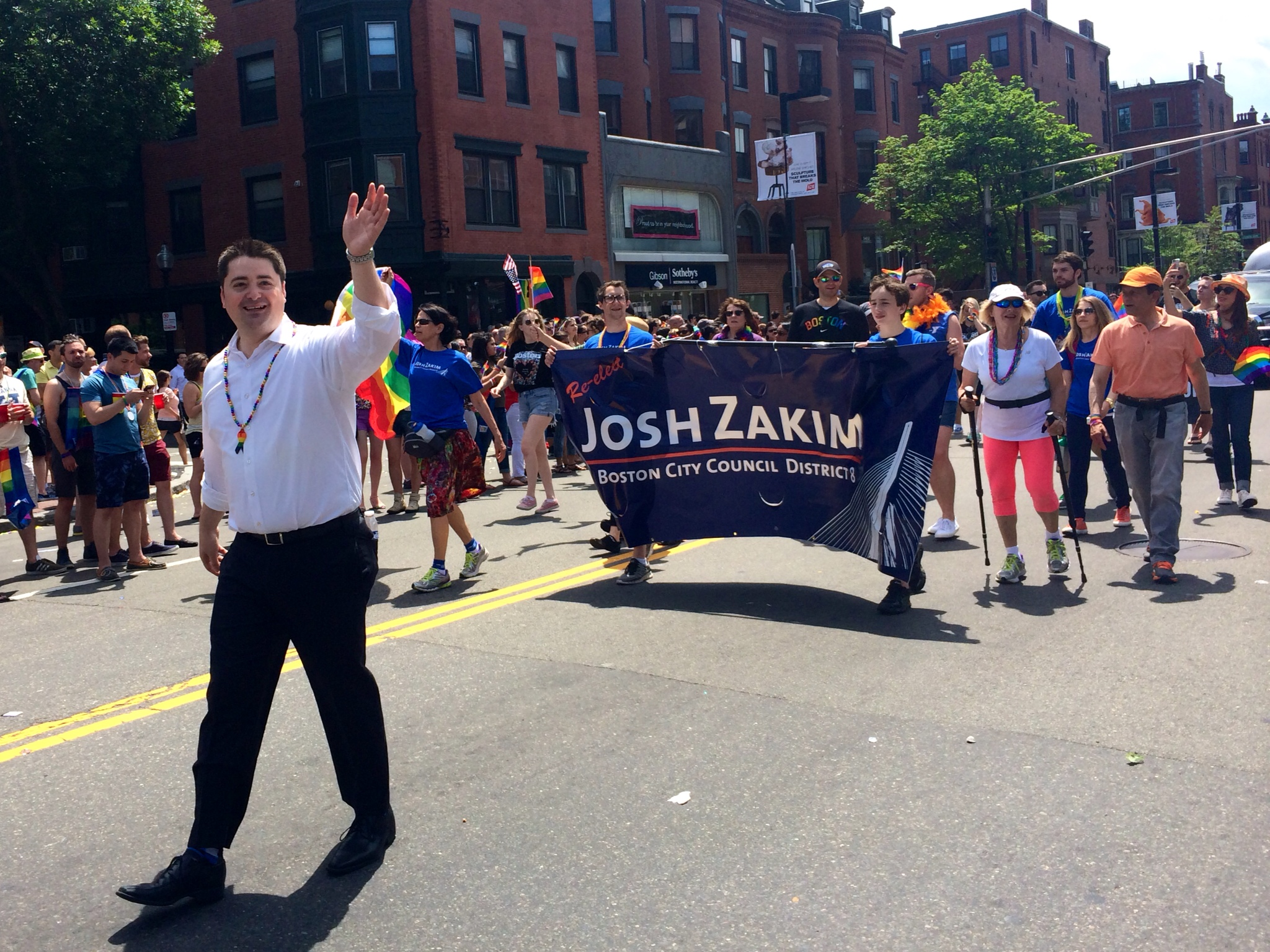
Zakim in the 2015 Boston Pride Parade

Zakim began his career at Greater Boston Legal Services in their Consumer Rights Unit. He then went on to join the Public Finance group of the law firm Mintz, Levin, Cohn, Ferris, Glovsky, and Popeo, where he worked on municipal bond transactions for the Commonwealth of Massachusetts, MassPort, and the MBTA.

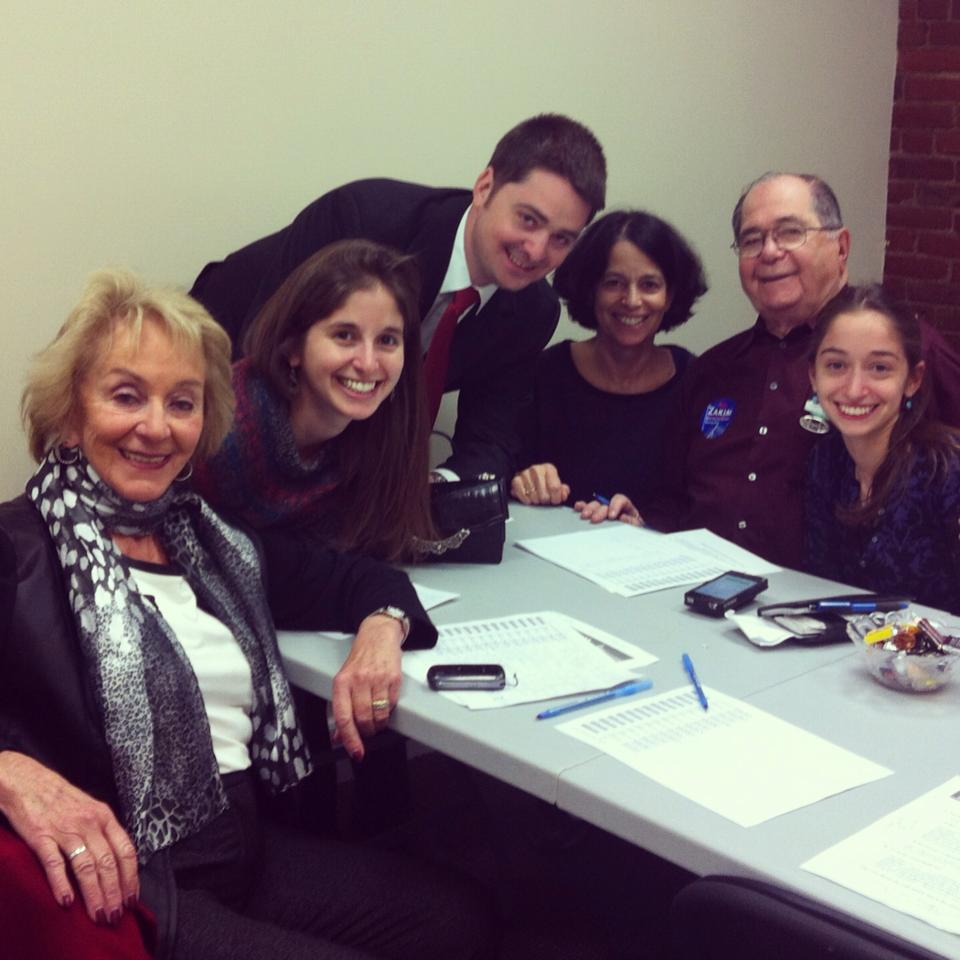
Zakim family on Boston Election Day in 2013

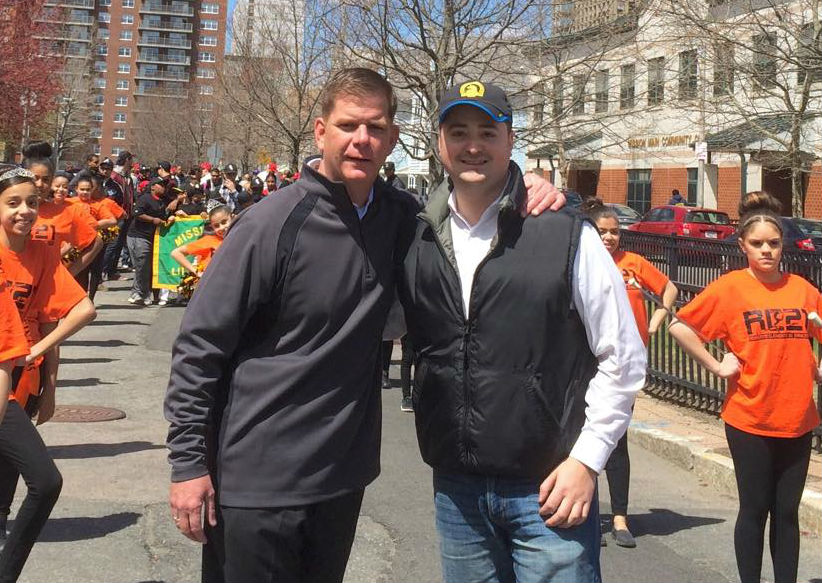
Boston City Councilor Josh Zakim with Boston Mayor Marty Walsh at the 2015 Mission Hill Little League Opening Day Parade

Zakim was elected to the Boston City Council in November 2013. He served as the Chair of both the Committee on Human Rights and Civil Rights and the Special Committee on Transportation, Public Infrastructure, Planning, and Investment. Zakim was a progressive voice on the Boston City Council, with his legislative priorities centered around social and economic justice. He was re-elected without opposition in November 2015. In November 2017, he was challenged for his seat by longtime community activist Kristen Mobilia, but Zakim held his Council seat with a better than two-to-one win.

Zakim sponsored the Boston Trust Act, a so-called "sanctuary city" ordinance which orders Boston Police Department not to detain immigrants for potential deportation unless a criminal arrest warrant had been issued for them. Proponents of the Boston Trust Act argued that it would improve relations between immigrant communities and the local police, making immigrant communities more likely to report local crimes to police and to cooperate with police efforts. The ordinance was passed unanimously in 2014 by the Boston City Council and was signed into law by Mayor Walsh.

After the collapse of Boston's bid for the 2024 Summer Olympics, the organization No Boston Olympics (which had opposed the bid) endorsed Zakim and three other incumbent Boston City Council members for reelection, praising them for "Demonstrat[ing] leadership by asking tough questions" to the leaders behind Boston's Olympic bid.

In August 2016, Zakim was one of only two city councilors to vote against a resolution that voiced City Council opposition to 2016 Massachusetts Question 2, a ballot measure that would have authorized the expansion of charter schools in the state. The resolution overwhelmingly passed the council 11–2. The referendum wound up being heavily defeated by voters.

In November 2017, Zakim announced that he would run for Massachusetts Secretary of the Commonwealth in 2018, challenging incumbent and fellow-Democrat William F. Galvin. In the Democratic primary held on September 4, 2018, Zakim was defeated by Galvin, by approximately a two-to-one margin.

In April 2019, Zakim joined Michelle Wu as one of only two city councilors to vote against a home rule petition asking for state approval for the city to extend the terms of city councilors from two years to four years. The petition advanced from the City Council in a 11–2 vote. Zakim's vote marked a change from 2016, when he did not join Wu in opposing such a petition (leaving her the sole opposition in a 12–1 vote).

On March 21, 2019, Zakim announced that he would not seek re-election to the City Council in the November 2019 election.
