= Felix D. Arroyo =

American politician

- Born: April 16, 1948 (age 78); Puerto Rico, U.S.
- Education: University of Puerto Rico
- Occupations: Politician, teacher
- Years active: 1981–2023
- Political party: Democratic
- Children: Felix G. Arroyo, Ricardo Arroyo

Felix D. Arroyo (born April 16, 1948) is an American retired politician. He held roles in the cabinet of the Mayor of Boston under Raymond Flynn; served on the Boston School Committee; was an at-large member of the Boston City Council; and was the Register of Probate for Suffolk County, Massachusetts, at the time of his retirement in 2023.

== Early years ==
Arroyo was raised in a public housing project in Arecibo, Puerto Rico, by his father, Felicito Arroyo, a World War II veteran and police detective, and his mother, Elisa Arroyo, a garment seamstress and an ILGWU member.

Arroyo completed his undergraduate studies and received a Masters in Secondary Education at the University of Puerto Rico. He was the first member of his family to earn a college degree; he continued with his graduate studies at Harvard University, MIT, and the University of Puerto Rico.

A long-time resident of Boston, Arroyo taught at Springfield College, UMass Boston, Roxbury Community College, Boston University, and Emmanuel College.

== Political career ==
Arroyo ran for the Boston School Committee in 1981 and 1983, becoming the first Latino to run citywide, and the first Latino to pass a primary. In 1984, Arroyo founded the Latino Democratic Committee, the first statewide Latino political organization in Massachusetts, and served as the Latin American Affairs Director for United States Senator John Kerry. Arroyo served in the cabinet of Mayor of Boston Raymond Flynn from 1985 until 1992. In 1992, Arroyo resigned his salaried position as the Director of Personnel for the City of Boston, in order to take an unpaid position as a member of the Boston School Committee. He later served as Vice President and President of the Boston School Committee, where he served from 1992 until 1999.

=== Boston City Council ===
Arroyo joined the Boston City Council as one of its four at-large members in January 2003, after placing fifth for an at-large seat in the November 2001 election; he was seated after Francis Roache resigned. Arroyo was re-elected in November 2003 and November 2005. He narrowly lost in November 2007, placing fifth in a field of nine candidates—his loss was attributed to low turnout among nonwhite communities, coupled with disproportionately strong turnout in traditionally white, Irish enclaves; overall turnout was only 13.6%.

=== Register of Probate ===
Arroyo announced he was running for Register of Probate for Suffolk County on February 11, 2014. He won the Democratic nomination with over 53% of the vote on September 9, 2014, and won an uncontested general election in November 2014. He was the first Latino to win a county-wide political race in Massachusetts. Arroyo was suspended from his job in February 2017, reportedly due to questions about his performance; he returned to work in October 2017 and has deemed the suspension "unjust". He was re-elected in November 2020, garnering a 77.1% majority against two opponents including perennial candidate Althea Garrison. Arroyo retired as Register of Probate in March 2023.

== Personal life ==
Arroyo has worked to promote peace and justice on a local and global level for more than 25 years. Locally, he has sought to curtail domestic violence, gang violence, and hate crimes, and was a vocal advocate against the Iraq War. Working globally for peace, he has traveled to Nicaragua with Witness for Peace and to El Salvador with Sister Cities International. He has traveled to Haiti and visited Israel as a peace delegate, and went to the Dominican Republic in 1999 to distribute supplies with a hurricane relief delegation.

In May 2024, Arroyo filed for bankruptcy, amid a lawsuit over an unpaid legal bill of approximately $86,000 related to his suspension as Register of Probate.

Two of Arroyo sons have also been elected to the Boston City Council: Felix G. Arroyo served as an at-large member from January 2010 to January 2014, and Ricardo Arroyo served from January 2020 to January 2024 representing District 5.

== Selected positions held ==
- Boston City Councilor At-Large, 2003–2008
- Latin American Affairs Director for United States Senator John Kerry, 1984
- Committee Chair: New Bostonians and Youth Affairs
- Committee Vice Chair: Human Rights
- Committee Member: Environment; Health & Human Services; Housing
- Director of Advocacy at the Hispanic Office of Planning and Evaluation
- President, Vice President and Member of the Boston School Committee, 1992–1999
- Director of Personnel for the City of Boston
- Education Advisor to Mayor Raymond Flynn
- Chair of the Boston Arson Commission
- Encuentro5 Advisory Board member
- Teacher at Springfield College, UMass-Boston, Roxbury Community College, Boston University, and Emmanuel College
