= Robert Consalvo =

Rob Consalvo
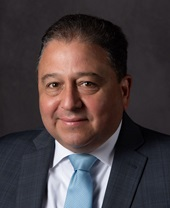
- Official portrait, 2021

Member of the Massachusetts House of Representatives from the 14th Suffolk district
- Incumbent
- Assumed office January 2021
- Preceded by: Angelo Scaccia

Member of the Boston City Council from the 5th district
- In office June 2002 – January 2014
- Preceded by: Daniel F. Conley
- Succeeded by: Timothy McCarthy

Personal details
- Born: July 16, 1969 (age 57) Hyde Park, Boston, Massachusetts, U.S.
- Party: Democratic
- Education: Xavier University (BA)

Robert Consalvo (born July 16, 1969) is a Massachusetts State Representative, the former chief of staff for Boston Public Schools, and a former member of the Boston City Council. For 12 years he represented District 5, which includes the Hyde Park, Roslindale, Readville, and Mattapan neighborhoods of Boston, Massachusetts.

== Early life and education ==
A graduate of Catholic Memorial High School in West Roxbury, Massachusetts, Consalvo matriculated to Xavier University in Cincinnati, Ohio, and graduated with a bachelor's degree in Political Science. He served on the staff of the late Senator Edward M. Kennedy in Washington DC, both in his Senate Office and the Health, Education, Labor and Human Services Committee, and later in Boston. He also worked at the Massachusetts State House as Director of Constituent Services for State Representative Angelo M. Scaccia. Consalvo’s duties included researching and contributing to the development of state budgets, writing language, drafting budget amendments and developing state legislation.

== Early career ==
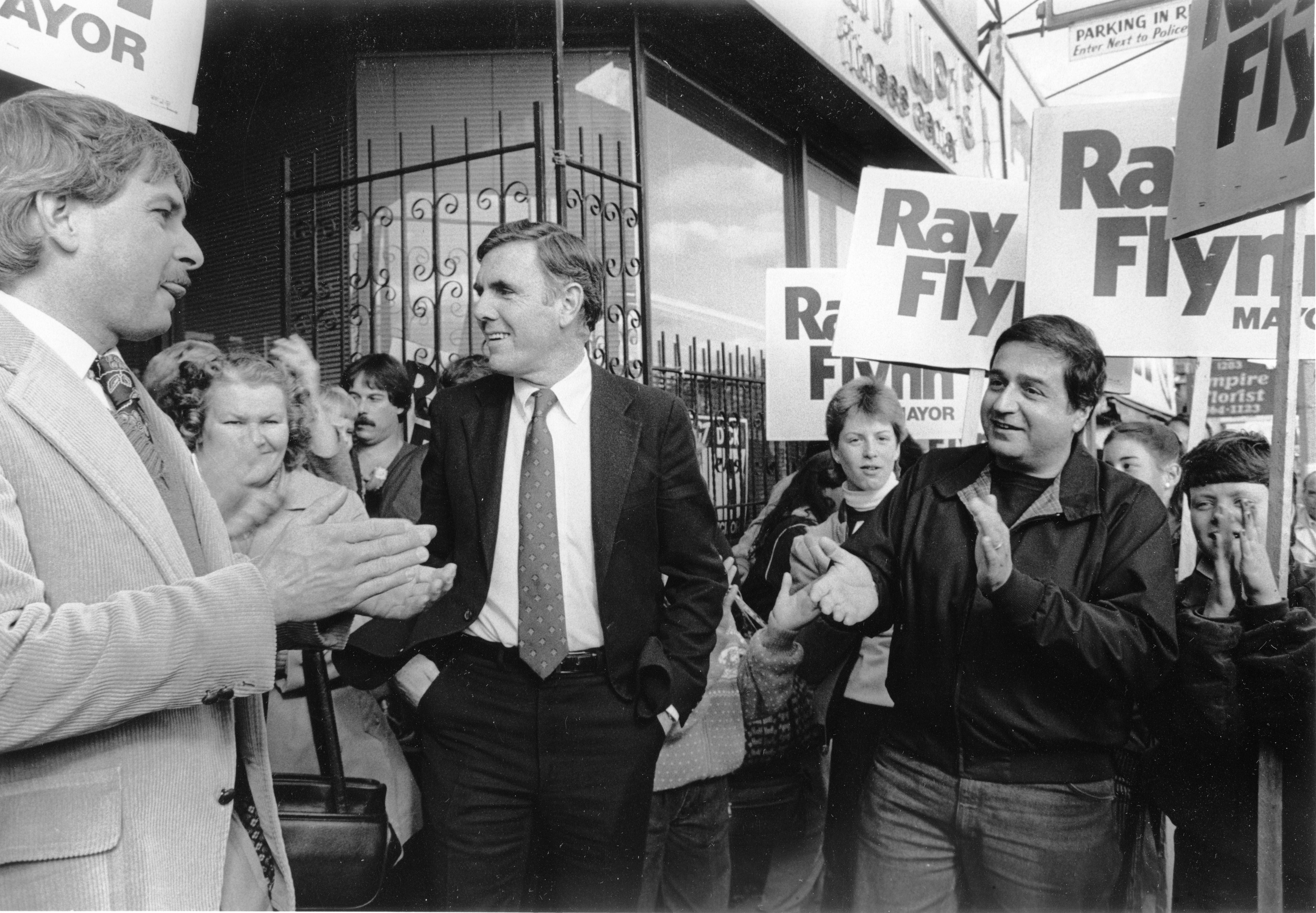
Consalvo (right) with Mayor Raymond Flynn (center) during Flynn's the 1987 reelection campaign

Consalvo held roles within the mayoral administration of Raymond Flynn, including Boston city personnel director. In 1992, Flynn appointed Consalvo to serve as executive director of the Boston School Committee.

== Political career ==
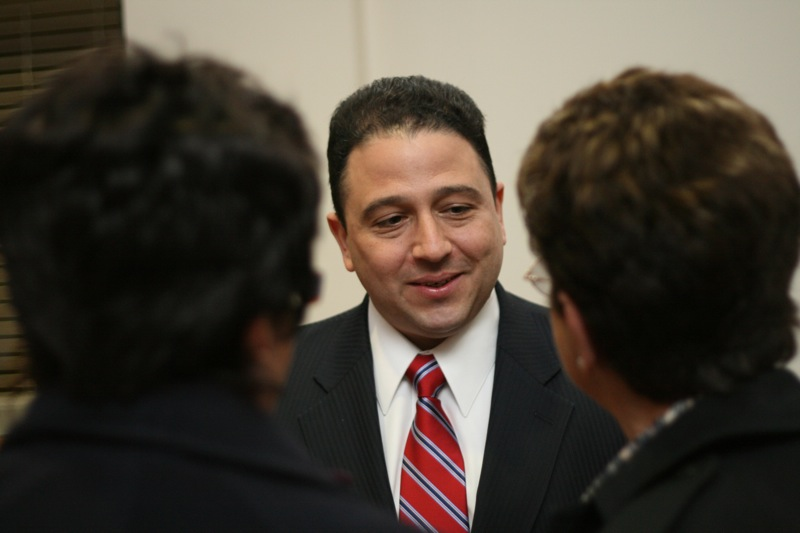
Consalvo in 2009

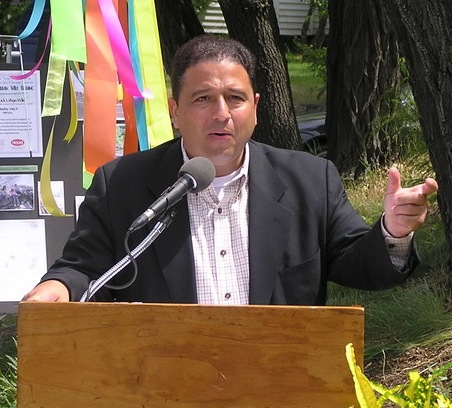
Consalvo in 2010

=== Boston City Council ===
After placing sixth as an at-large candidate in his first bid for elected office to the council in November 2001, Consalvo was elected to represent District 5 on the Boston City Council in a special election in June 2002. Consalvo was re-elected to additional two-year terms five times (2003, 2005, 2007, 2009, and 2011). District 5 has a diverse population of about 80,000 residents.

Consalvo served as chair of the Housing Committee, vice chair of the Government Operations Committee, and was the council’s trustee for the Neighborhood Housing Trust, which has awarded approximately $84,000,000 in linkage funds since its inception to build affordable housing in Boston. He was a member multiple committees; Public Safety, Education, Ways & Means, Labor, Youth Affairs & Human Rights, Whole, and the Special Committee on Asthma.

=== 2013 mayoral campaign ===
Consalvo did not seek re-election to the council in 2013, instead opting to run for mayor of Boston. He finished seventh in the preliminary round of the election, failing to advance to the general election.

=== Massachusetts House of Representatives ===
Consalvo was elected to the Massachusetts House of Representatives in 2020 as the Democratic nominee for the 14th Suffolk District seat.

== Personal life ==
Consalvo is a resident of the Hyde Park neighborhood of Boston; he is married with three children. In November 2014, he was appointed Deputy Director of the Home Center for the City of Boston. Within the Department of Neighborhood Development, the Home Center works to "help create financial initiatives to help seniors stay in their homes; increase the access of more middle-income Bostonians to home ownership opportunities; and assist residents in making their homes greener and more energy efficient." In February 2017, he was named chief of staff for Boston Public Schools.

== See also ==
- 2021–2022 Massachusetts legislature
