= Paul Scapicchio =

American politician and executive

Paul Scapicchio is president and CEO of the Novus Group and a former member of the Boston City Council (1997 to 2006, representing East Boston and Chinatown). In 2023, he co-founded Boston’s inaugural ClimaTech conference.

== Career ==
Scapicchio was a judicial clerk for the Honorable Gerald Gillerman of the Massachusetts Appeals Court. While on the Boston City Council, he served as Vice President as well as chairing the Committees on Aviation, Transportation, Intergovernmental Relations, and Economic Development.

== Education ==
Scapicchio graduated from the Boston Latin School and went on to earn a B.A. from Tufts University, J.D. from Northeastern University School of Law, and a Masters of Public Administration from Harvard University's Kennedy School of Government.
