= Michael P. Ross =

American lawyer

Mike Ross
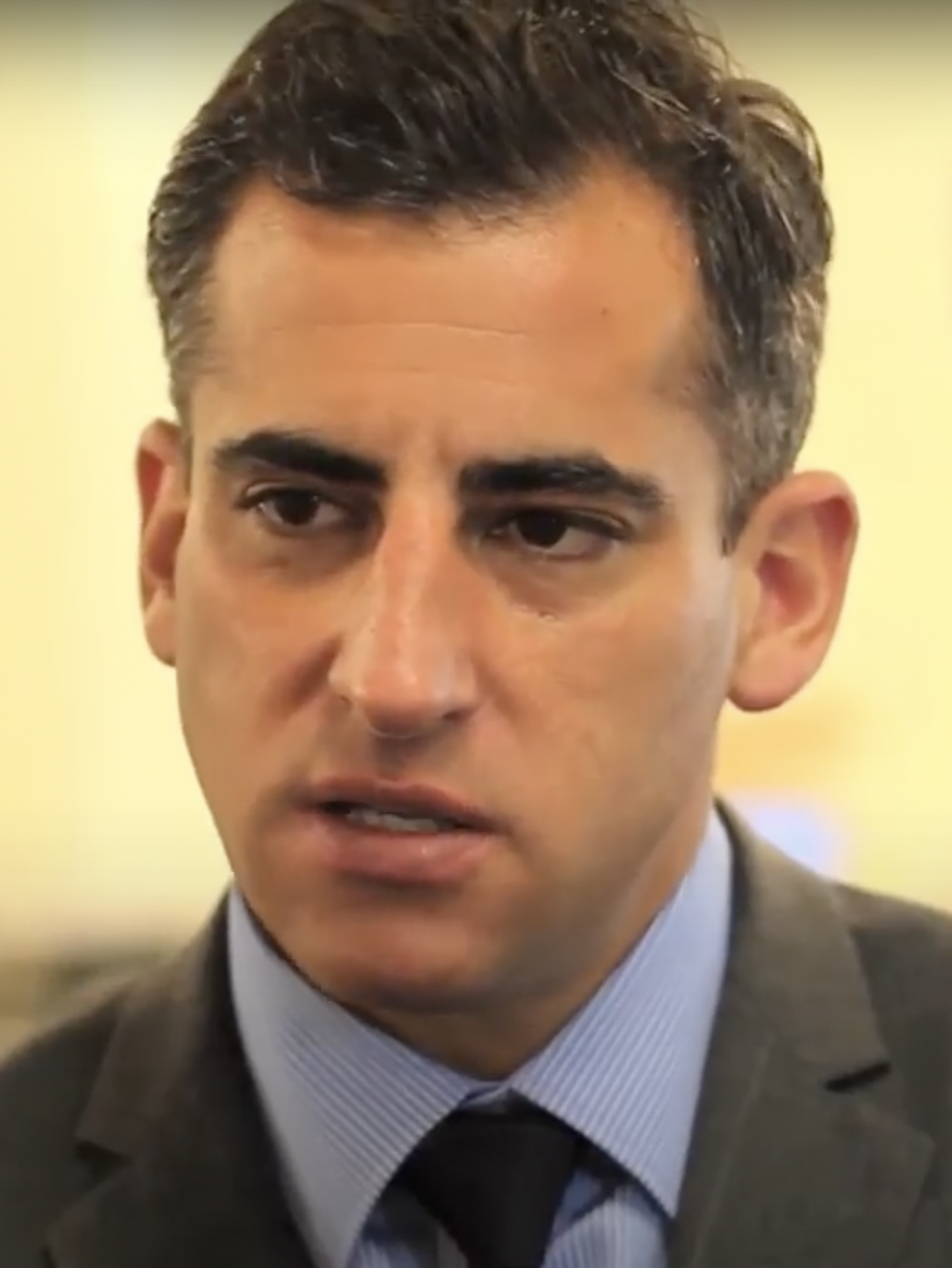
- Ross in 2013

President of the Boston City Council
- In office 2009–2010
- Preceded by: Maureen Feeney
- Succeeded by: Stephen J. Murphy

Member of the Boston City Council from District 8
- In office 2000–2013
- Preceded by: Thomas M. Keane Jr.
- Succeeded by: Josh Zakim

Personal details
- Born: 1972 (age 53–54)
- Website: http://www.mikerossboston.com/

Michael P. Ross (born 1972) is an American lawyer and former politician from Boston, Massachusetts, who represented District 8 (which includes Beacon Hill, Back Bay, and the Fenway) on the Boston City Council from 2000 through 2013. He was an unsuccessful candidate for mayor of Boston in 2013. Ross is now a real estate lawyer at Prince Lobel Tye LLP, and is a regular contributor to The Boston Globe.

== Family ==
Ross is a first-generation American. He was born in 1972 to Stephan Ross, a survivor of The Holocaust, and the founder of the New England Holocaust Memorial. Stephan Ross survived ten concentration camps during The Holocaust, and was rescued by American soldiers at Dachau. Ross's mother is openly gay. Ross's sister Julie works as a corporate attorney in Boston.

== City Council ==
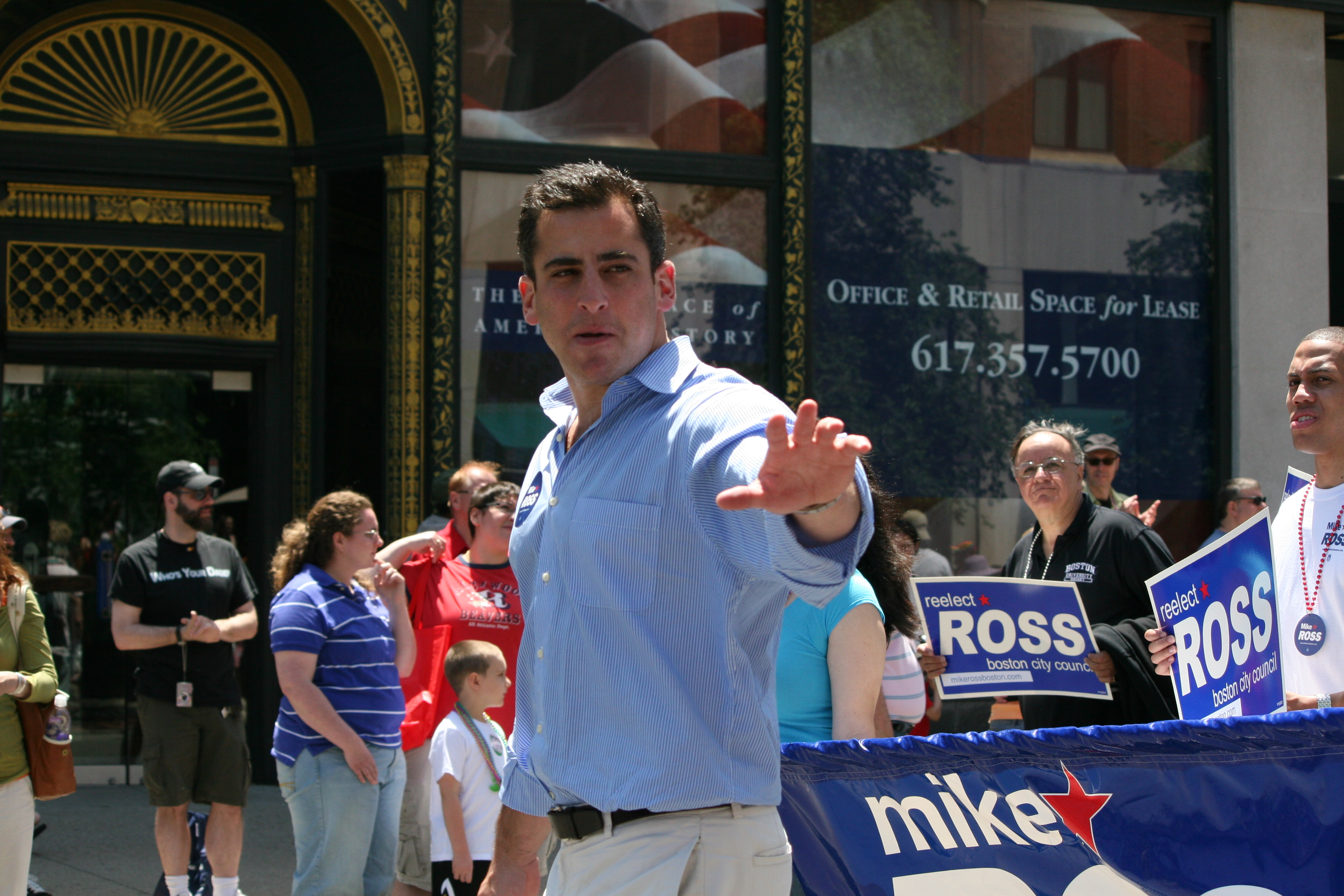
Ross at the 2009 Boston Gay Pride Parade

Ross was first elected to the Boston City Council in November 1999, then re-elected to six two-year terms, serving a total of 14 years (2000–2013). He represented District 8, which included Beacon Hill, Back Bay, and the Fenway. He was additionally president of the council for two one-year terms, in 2009 and 2010.

Ross was an unsuccessful candidate for mayor of Boston in 2013.

== Post-council career ==
After leaving the city council, Ross worked as a real estate lawyer at Prince Lobel Tye LLP, and a regular contributor to The Boston Globe.

== Personal life ==
Ross lives in the East Boston neighborhood of Boston. He holds a bachelor's degree from Clark University in Worcester, an MBA from Boston University, and a J.D. degree from Suffolk University Law School. He is married to Tomi Druyan Ross.

Preceded by Maureen Feeney	President of the Boston City Council; 2009–2010	Succeeded by Stephen J. Murphy
