= 2001 Boston City Council election =

- November 6, 2001

Boston City Council elections were held on November 6, 2001. Nine seats (five representatives and four at-large members) were contested in the general election, as the incumbents for districts 1, 5, 8, and 9 ran unopposed. Two seats (districts 3 and 6) had also been contested in the preliminary election held on September 25, 2001.

== At-large ==
Councillors Francis Roache, Stephen J. Murphy, and Michael F. Flaherty were re-elected. Councillor Peggy Davis-Mullen did not seek re-election, as she ran for Mayor of Boston, losing in the mayoral election to incumbent Thomas Menino. Davis-Mullen's at-large seat was won by Maura Hennigan, who had been the District 6 councillor since 1984, and a member of the council since 1982.

Candidates	General Election		Recount	
Candidates	Votes	%	Votes	%
Francis Roache	44,062	19.0%		
Michael F. Flaherty	42,869	18.5%		
Maura Hennigan	40,423	17.4%		
Stephen J. Murphy	39,436	17.0%		
Felix D. Arroyo†	28,551	12.3%	28,746	
Robert Consalvo	28,584	12.3%	28,678	
Phyllis Yetman Igoe	8,186	3.5%		

† Francis Roache resigned his council seat after being elected Registrar of Deeds for Suffolk County in November 2002; Felix D. Arroyo joined the council in January 2003 to serve the remainder of Roache's term.

== District 1 ==
Councillor Paul Scapicchio ran unopposed and was re-elected.

== District 2 ==
Councillor James M. Kelly was re-elected.

Candidates	General Election	
Candidates	Votes	%
James M. Kelly	7,556	65.6%
Richard Evans	3,967	34.4%

== District 3 ==
Councillor Maureen Feeney was re-elected.

Candidates	Preliminary Election		General Election	
Candidates	Votes	%	Votes	%
Maureen Feeney		66%	7,435	80.5%
Mark Juaire		14%	1,796	19.5%
Nathan Cooper		4.5%		
John Comerford		3.8%		
Gerard Brophy		2.0%		
Joseph Ureneck		1.6%		

== District 4 ==
Councillor Charles Yancey was re-elected.

Candidates	General Election	
Candidates	Votes	%
Charles Yancey	6,164	86.7%
Vikki Middleton	943	13.3%

== District 5 ==
=== General election ===
Councillor Daniel F. Conley ran unopposed and was re-elected.

=== Special election ===
In February 2002, Conley was named interim district attorney for Suffolk County; he resigned his council seat shortly thereafter. The vacancy was filled by a special election, which took place on June 4, 2002, with the preliminary election on May 7, 2002. Robert Consalvo was elected to serve the remainder of Conley's term.

Candidates	Special Prelim. Election		Special Gen. Election	
Candidates	Votes	%	Votes	%
Robert Consalvo	3,718	63.9%	4,277	65.1%
Adriana Cillo	1,929	33.2%	2,294	34.9%
Anthony J. Solimine	167	2.9%		

== District 6 ==
Councillor Maura Hennigan ran for (and won) an at-large seat on the council; her district seat was won by John M. Tobin Jr.

Candidates	Preliminary Election		General Election	
Candidates	Votes	%	Votes	%
John M. Tobin Jr.		35.6%	7,537	54.0%
Michael Rush		44.0%	6,424	46.0%
Elaine Rigas		14.6%		
Edgar Williams		1.1%		

== District 7 ==
Councillor Chuck Turner was re-elected.

Candidates	General Election	
Candidates	Votes	%
Chuck Turner	5,617	83.2%
Roy Owens	1,136	16.8%

== District 8 ==
Councillor Michael P. Ross ran unopposed and was re-elected.

== District 9 ==
=== General election ===
Councillor Brian Honan ran unopposed and was re-elected.

=== Special election ===
Honan died in July 2002, creating a vacancy that was filled by a special election, which took place on December 10, 2002, with the preliminary election on November 12, 2002. Jerry P. McDermott was elected to serve the remainder of Honan's term.

Candidates	Special Prelim. Election		Special Gen. Election	
Candidates	Votes	%	Votes	%
Jerry P. McDermott	1,668	29%	2,682	54.2%
Mark Ciommo	1,310	23%	2,268	45.8%
Cathleen Campbell	1,152	20%		
John Bruno	322	4%		
Rosie Hanlon	530	9%		
Arturo Vasquez	322	6%		
Gary Dotterman	187	3%		
Mark Trachtenberg	54	1%		
Dan McLaughlin	290	5%		

== See also ==
- List of members of the Boston City Council
- 2001 Boston mayoral election
