= 1995 Boston City Council election =

- November 7, 1995

Boston City Council elections were held on November 7, 1995. Ten seats (six district representatives and four at-large members) were contested in the general election, as the incumbents for districts 2, 5, and 8 ran unopposed. Nine seats (five districts and the four at-large members) had also been contested in the preliminary election held on September 19, 1995.

== At-large ==
Councillors Dapper O'Neil, Richard P. Iannella, and Peggy Davis-Mullen were re-elected. Councillor John A. Nucci, who had been elected Suffolk County clerk of courts in November 1994, did not seek re-election; his seat was won by former Boston Police Commissioner Francis Roache.

Candidates	Preliminary election		General election	
Candidates	Votes	%	Votes	%
Francis Roache	18,963	13.5	30,985	16.2
Dapper O'Neil (incumbent)	22,333	15.9	30,524	15.9
Richard P. Iannella (incumbent)	17,970	12.8	28,431	14.8
Peggy Davis-Mullen (incumbent)	17,964	12.8	23,913	12.5
Stephen J. Murphy†	14,255	10.1	21,571	11.3
Michael F. Flaherty	14,368	10.2	20,215	10.5
Frank N. Jones	6,960	5.0	20,047	10.5
Paul J. Gannon	11,724	8.3	16,012	8.4
Anthony Crayton	5,299	3.8		
Joseph P. Donnelly	3,188	2.3		
Dick Czubinski	1,885	1.3		
Edgar Williams Jr.	1,568	1.1		
Anthony L. Dantona	1,372	1.0		
Matthew D. Malloy	1,359	1.0		
Maceo Carl Dixon	1,334	0.9		

† Richard P. Iannella was elected Register of Probate of Suffolk County in November 1996, and subsequently resigned his council seat; Stephen J. Murphy, who had finished fifth in the general election for four seats, joined the council in February 1997 and served the remainder of Iannella's term.

== District 1 ==
Councillor Diane J. Modica was re-elected.

Candidates	Preliminary election		General election	
Candidates	Votes	%	Votes	%
Diane J. Modica (incumbent)	4,085	83.9	5,617	85.0
Vincent Zarrilli	519	10.7	995	15.0
John Hugo	265	5.4		

== District 2 ==
Councillor James M. Kelly ran unopposed and was re-elected.

Candidates	General election	
Candidates	Votes	%
James M. Kelly (incumbent)	7,044	100

== District 3 ==
Councillor Maureen Feeney was re-elected.

Candidates	General election	
Candidates	Votes	%
Maureen Feeney (incumbent)	5,633	83.3
W. Scott Rae	1,132	16.7

== District 4 ==
Councillor Charles Yancey was re-elected.

Candidates	Preliminary election		General election	
Candidates	Votes	%	Votes	%
Charles Yancey (incumbent)	1,189	65.5	2,646	65.1
Vikki Middleton	564	31.1	1,419	34.9
J. R. Rucker	63	3.5		

== District 5 ==
Councillor Daniel F. Conley ran unopposed and was re-elected.

Candidates	General election	
Candidates	Votes	%
Daniel F. Conley (incumbent)	6,433	100

== District 6 ==
Councillor Maura Hennigan was re-elected.

Candidates	Preliminary election		General election	
Candidates	Votes	%	Votes	%
Maura Hennigan (incumbent)	4,439	49.8	5,970	57.4
John M. Tobin Jr.	2,496	28.0	4,425	42.6
David Vaughn	1,495	16.8		
Francis X. Stone	482	5.4		

== District 7 ==
Councillor Gareth R. Saunders was re-elected.

Candidates	Preliminary election		General election	
Candidates	Votes	%	Votes	%
Gareth R. Saunders (incumbent)	1,262	55.4	2,361	62.1
Althea Garrison	553	24.3	1,441	37.9
Roy A. Owens	254	11.2		
Moses E. Wilson Jr.	209	9.2		

== District 8 ==
Councillor Thomas M. Keane Jr. ran unopposed and was re-elected.

Candidates	General election	
Candidates	Votes	%
Thomas M. Keane Jr. (incumbent)	2,021	100

== District 9 ==
Councillor Brian J. McLaughlin announced in March 1995 that he would not seek re-election; his seat was won by Brian Honan.

Candidates	Preliminary election		General election	
Candidates	Votes	%	Votes	%
Brian Honan	1,610	33.8	3,553	51.6
Jerry P. McDermott	1,723	36.2	3,332	48.4
Cathleen E. Campbell	1,066	22.4		
Stephen Montgomery	359	7.5		

== See also ==
- List of members of the Boston City Council
