= 1997 Boston City Council election =

- November 4, 1997

Boston City Council elections were held on November 4, 1997. All 13 seats (nine district representatives and four at-large members) were contested in the general election. Eight seats (four districts and the four at-large members) had also been contested in the preliminary election held on September 23, 1997.

== At-large ==
Councillors Francis Roache, Peggy Davis-Mullen, Dapper O'Neil, and Stephen J. Murphy were re-elected. Murphy had joined the council in February 1997, following the resignation of Richard P. Iannella. Iannella's sister Suzanne was an unsuccessful candidate in this election.

Candidates	Preliminary election		General election		Recount	
Candidates	Votes	%	Votes	%	Votes	%
Francis Roache (incumbent)	17,495	18.4	32,029	16.9		
Peggy Davis-Mullen (incumbent)	12,116	12.8	28,280	14.9		
Dapper O'Neil (incumbent)	14,310	15.1	27,591	14.6		
Stephen J. Murphy (incumbent)	15,247	16.1	26,702	14.1	26,736	
Suzanne Iannella	11,325	11.9	26,505	14.0	26,561	
Frank N. Jones	9,912	10.4	24,892	13.1		
Paul J. Gannon	9,292	9.8	17,131	9.0		
Pamela A. Smith	2,700	2.8	6,287	3.3		
Anthony A. Schinella	2,505	2.6				

== District 1 ==
Councillor Diane J. Modica lost her seat to Paul Scapicchio.

Candidates	Preliminary Election		General Election	
Candidates	Votes	%	Votes	%
Paul Scapicchio	3,766	55.5%	5,881	52.8%
Diane J. Modica (incumbent)	2,685	39.6%	5,256	47.2%
Alfred V. Siciliano Jr.	245	3.6%		
Carlos Rosas	86	1.3%		

== District 2 ==
Councillor James M. Kelly was re-elected.

Candidates	General Election	
Candidates	Votes	%
James M. Kelly (incumbent)	6,989	83.5%
Andrew McKinnon	1,383	16.5%

== District 3 ==
Councillor Maureen Feeney was re-elected.

Candidates	Preliminary Election		General Election	
Candidates	Votes	%	Votes	%
Maureen Feeney (incumbent)	3,066	71.2%	4,951	71.8%
Barry J. Mullen	707	16.4%	1,940	28.2%
John M. Comerford	531	12.3%		

== District 4 ==
Councillor Charles Yancey was re-elected.

Candidates	Preliminary Election		General Election	
Candidates	Votes	%	Votes	%
Charles Yancey (incumbent)	1,166	52.5%	2,781	64.2%
Bill Owens	632	28.5%	1,552	35.8%
Vikki Middleton	374	16.9%		
J. R. Rucker	47	2.1%		

== District 5 ==
Councillor Daniel F. Conley was re-elected.

Candidates	General Election	
Candidates	Votes	%
Daniel F. Conley (incumbent)	7,591	84.6%
Daniel Esdale	1,383	15.4%

== District 6 ==
Councillor Maura Hennigan was re-elected.

Candidates	General Election	
Candidates	Votes	%
Maura Hennigan (incunmbent)	6,903	82.4%
Edgar Williams	1,478	17.6%

== District 7 ==
Councillor Gareth R. Saunders was re-elected.

Candidates	Preliminary Election		General Election	
Candidates	Votes	%	Votes	%
Gareth R. Saunders (incumbent)	851	40.5%	2,278	61.4%
Althea Garrison	360	17.1%	1,430	38.6%
Roy A. Owens	349	16.6%		
Anthony Crayton	341	16.2%		
Robert L. Terrell	200	9.5%		

== District 8 ==
Councillor Thomas M. Keane Jr. was re-elected.

Candidates	General Election	
Candidates	Votes	%
Thomas M. Keane Jr. (incumbent)	2,286	74.7%
Lynda McNally	776	25.3%

== District 9 ==
Councillor Brian Honan was re-elected.

Candidates	General Election	
Candidates	Votes	%
Brian Honan (incumbent)	3,677	88.7%
Aramis Camps	469	11.3%

== See also ==
- List of members of the Boston City Council
- 1997 Boston mayoral election
