= 1999 Boston City Council election =

Election in the United States of America

- November 2, 1999

Boston City Council elections were held on November 2, 1999. Eleven seats (seven district representatives and four at-large members) were contested in the general election, as the incumbents for districts 1 and 2 ran unopposed. Ten seats (six districts and the four at-large members) had also been contested in the preliminary election held on September 21, 1999.

== At-large ==
Councillors Francis Roache, Stephen J. Murphy, and Peggy Davis-Mullen were re-elected. Councillor Dapper O'Neil, a member of the council since 1971, lost his seat to Michael F. Flaherty.

Candidates	Preliminary election		General election	
Candidates	Votes	%	Votes	%
Francis Roache (incumbent)	21.648	19.1	30,271	18.1
Stephen J. Murphy (incumbent)	19,623	17.3	27,515	16.4
Peggy Davis-Mullen (incumbent)	16,198	14.3	26,468	15.8
Michael F. Flaherty	14,422	12.7	26,377	15.8
Dapper O'Neil (incumbent)	17,237	15.2	24,636	14.7
Gregory B. Timilty	10,876	9.6	16,068	9.6
Joseph Mulligan III	6.111	5.4	10,012	6.0
Andrea Morrell	3,338	2.9	6,093	3.6
Daniel Kontoff	2,004	1.8		
John Hugo	1,790	1.6		

== District 1 ==
Councillor Paul Scapicchio ran unopposed and was re-elected.

== District 2 ==
Councillor James M. Kelly ran unopposed and was re-elected.

== District 3 ==
Councillor Maureen Feeney was re-elected.

Candidates	General election	
Candidates	Votes	%
Maureen Feeney (incumbent)	4,772	80.7
John M. Comerford	1,142	19.3

== District 4 ==
Councillor Charles Yancey was re-elected.

Candidates	Preliminary election		General election	
Candidates	Votes	%	Votes	%
Charles Yancey (incumbent)	1,166	79.0	2,243	82.4
Vikki Middleton	247	16.7	479	17.6
J. R. Rucker	63	4.3		

== District 5 ==
Councillor Daniel F. Conley was re-elected.

Candidates	Preliminary election		General election	
Candidates	Votes	%	Votes	%
Daniel F. Conley (incumbent)	4,392	90.2	6,085	89.0
David Patrick	245	5.0	749	11.0
J. J. Devine Jr.	230	4.7		

== District 6 ==
Councillor Maura Hennigan was re-elected.

Candidates	Preliminary election		General election	
Candidates	Votes	%	Votes	%
Maura Hennigan (incumbent)	3,455	43.3	6,023	54.5
John M. Tobin Jr.	2,559	32.1	5,034	45.5
Michael Rush	1,863	23.3		
Edgar Williams	102	1.3		

== District 7 ==
Councillor Gareth R. Saunders had announced in June 1999 that he would not seek re-election; his seat was won by Chuck Turner.

Candidates	Preliminary Election		General Election	
Candidates	Votes	%	Votes	%
Chuck Turner	1,153	33.9%	2,419	58.4%
Tracy Litthcut	590	17.3%	1,726	41.6%
Julio Henriquez	339	10.0%		
Roy A. Owens	314	9.2%		
Althea Garrison	282	8.3%		
Anthony Crayton	255	7.5%		
Hassan Ali Williams	122	3.6%		
Richard Masterson	115	3.4%		
Scotland Willis	70	2.1%		
Kenneth Yarbrough	65	1.9%		
Roger Garvin	51	1.5%		
Thelma Barros	47	1.4%		

== District 8 ==
Councillor Thomas M. Keane Jr. had announced in March 1999 that he would not seek re-election; his seat was won by Michael P. Ross, who defeated Suzanne Iannella, daughter of former council president Christopher A. Iannella and sister of former council member Richard P. Iannella.

Candidates	Preliminary Election		General Election	
Candidates	Votes	%	Votes	%
Michael P. Ross	851	28.4%	2,793	54.0%
Suzanne Iannella	985	32.9%	2,384	46.0%
Alana Murphy	656	21.9%		
Anthony Schinella	174	5.8%		
Carmen Torres	170	5.7%		
Lynda McNally	160	5.3%		

== District 9 ==
Councillor Brian Honan was re-elected.

Candidates	Preliminary Election		General Election	
Candidates	Votes	%	Votes	%
Brian Honan	2,562	76.9%	3,407	76.1%
Rosie Hanlon	699	21.0%	1,070	23.9%
Aramis Camps	69	2.1%		

== See also ==
- List of members of the Boston City Council
