= Michael F. Flaherty =

American politician

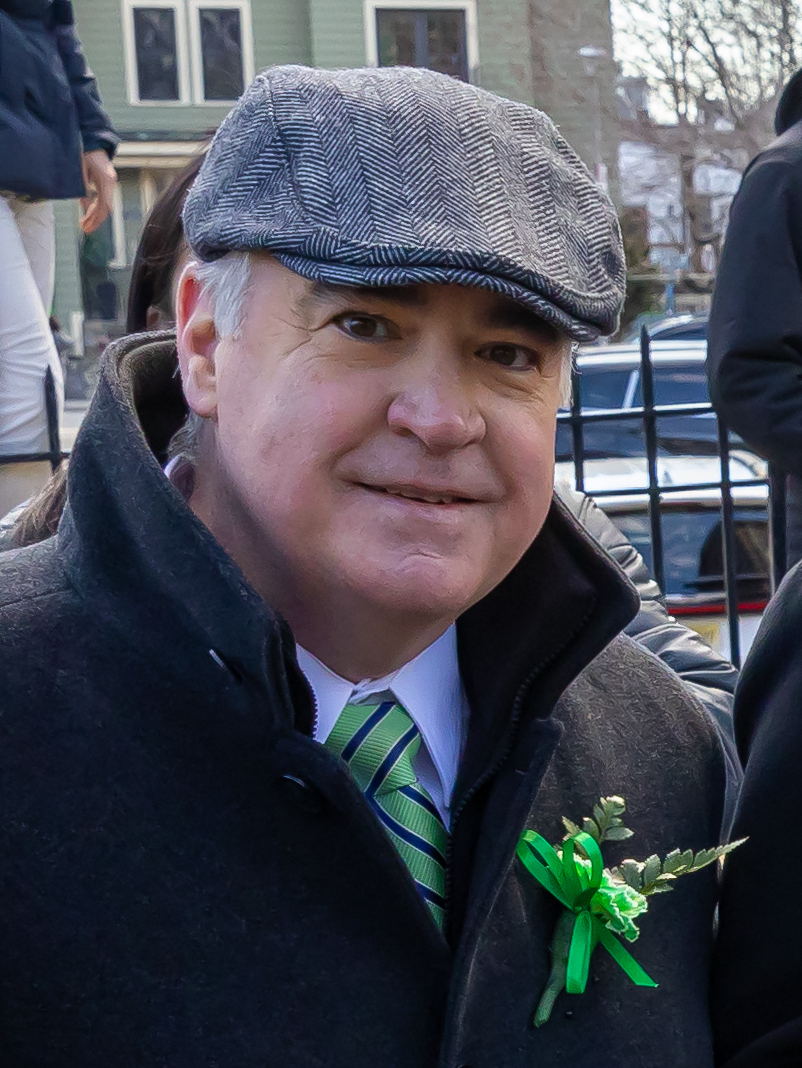
- Flaherty in 2023

Member of the Boston City Council at-large
- In office January 2014 – January 2024
- Preceded by: John R. Connolly and Felix G. Arroyo
- Succeeded by: Henry Santana
- In office January 2000 – January 2010
- Preceded by: Dapper O'Neil
- Succeeded by: Ayanna Pressley and Felix G. Arroyo

President of the Boston City Council
- In office January 2002 – January 2007
- Preceded by: Charles Yancey
- Succeeded by: Maureen Feeney

Personal details
- Born: May 4, 1969 (age 57)
- Party: Democratic
- Spouse: Laurene Flaherty
- Relations: Michael F. Flaherty Sr. (father)
- Children: Patrick, Michael III, and twins Elizabeth and Jack
- Education: Boston College (BA); Boston University (JD)

Michael F. Flaherty (born May 4, 1969) is a politician who served as an at-large member of the Boston City Council for a cumulative ten terms. A member of the Democratic Party, he was first elected to the council in 1999, serving an initial five terms between 2000 until 2010. During this initial tenure, he served as vice president of the council in 2001 and as council president from 2002 to 2006. In 2009 he forwent re-election to a further term in order to run for mayor of Boston in that year's election, which he lost to incumbent mayor Thomas Menino. He ran unsuccessfully in 2011 to return to the council as an at-large member. In 2013, Flaherty again ran in the at-large city council race, and was returned to the council. He served five terms between 2014 and 2024. In 2023, he declined to seek re-election to an additional term.

== Early life, education, and career ==
Flaherty was born and grew up in South Boston, where has also lived in his adulthood. His father, Michael F. Flaherty Sr., is a former associate justice of the Boston Municipal Court and a former state representative. Flaherty grew in the Old Harbor Housing Project, a public housing project.

Flaherty graduated from Boston College High School, a private school in the Dorchester neighborhood. He graduated from Boston College. He earned a Juris Doctor degree at the Boston University School of Law, attending on a scholarship from Teamsters Local 25 (a trade union which provides law scholarships to family of its members).

Prior to being elected to the Boston City Council in 1999, Flaherty was an assistant district attorney in the Suffolk County District Attorney's Office.

== First city council tenure (2000–2010) ==
=== Elections and council politics ===
Flaherty was first elected to the council in November 1999 as an at-large member. His election resulted in the unseating of longtime incumbent Dapper O'Neil. He was then re-elected to four additional two-year terms, holding office until January 2010.

After serving as vice president of the council in 2001,, Flaherty was reelected to the council in November 2001. In January 2002, Flaherty was elected by his fellow city councilors to serve as the council's president. Mayor Thomas Menino, who Flaherty had established a strong relationship with, had maneuvered to secure Flaherty the votes needed to become council president. During Flaherty's two-consecutive terms as council president, the council numerous times violated the state's open meetings law, for which it was successfully sued by Kevin McCrea, leading the council to plead guilty in 2008 to having violated the state's open meetings law between 2003 and 2005 by meeting illegally to discuss projects of the Boston Planning Agency (Boston Planning & Development Agency) and an outbreak at a Boston University bio-laboratory. Flaherty also was regarded as somewhat autocratic in his leadership of the council, often using parliamentary rules to prevent debate on matter that he regarded as immaterial for the council to discuss.

Flaherty was reelected in November 2003. He was the city council election's top vote-getter. Flaherty's margin of victory over first runner-up Felix D. Arroyo was 5,671 votes, which was the widest margin since the council had been restructured in 1983. After the newly elected council took office in January 2004, Flaherty was elected by the council members to serve a second-consecutive term as the council's president.

Flaherty won reelection in November 2005, again placing as the city council election's top vote-getter. He received only 14,000 fewer votes than Mayor Menino had in the coinciding 2005 Boston mayoral election. Viewing Flaherty's rising stature as a political threat, Menino successfully maneuvered to get Maureen Feeney elected council president in January 2007 instead of Flaherty. In turn, Flaherty became a vocal critic of the mayor. Flaherty gave particularly strong opposition to a proposal by the mayor to relocate the city government headquarters from the existing Boston City Hall to a new city hall along the city's waterfront. Flaherty won reelection in November 2007 and was once again the city council election's top vote-getter. Flaherty did not run for re-election in November 2009, instead opting to run for mayor of Boston.

=== LGBTQ rights ===
Flaherty established political ties to the city's gay community. Flaherty was the first city officeholder in Boston to voice support for same-sex marriage. He also gave his support to an ordinance prohibiting discrimination against transgender individuals. In 2023, Flaherty stated that his early support for same-sex marriage was what he was proudest of from his time on the council.

== Unsuccessful 2009 mayoral campaign ==
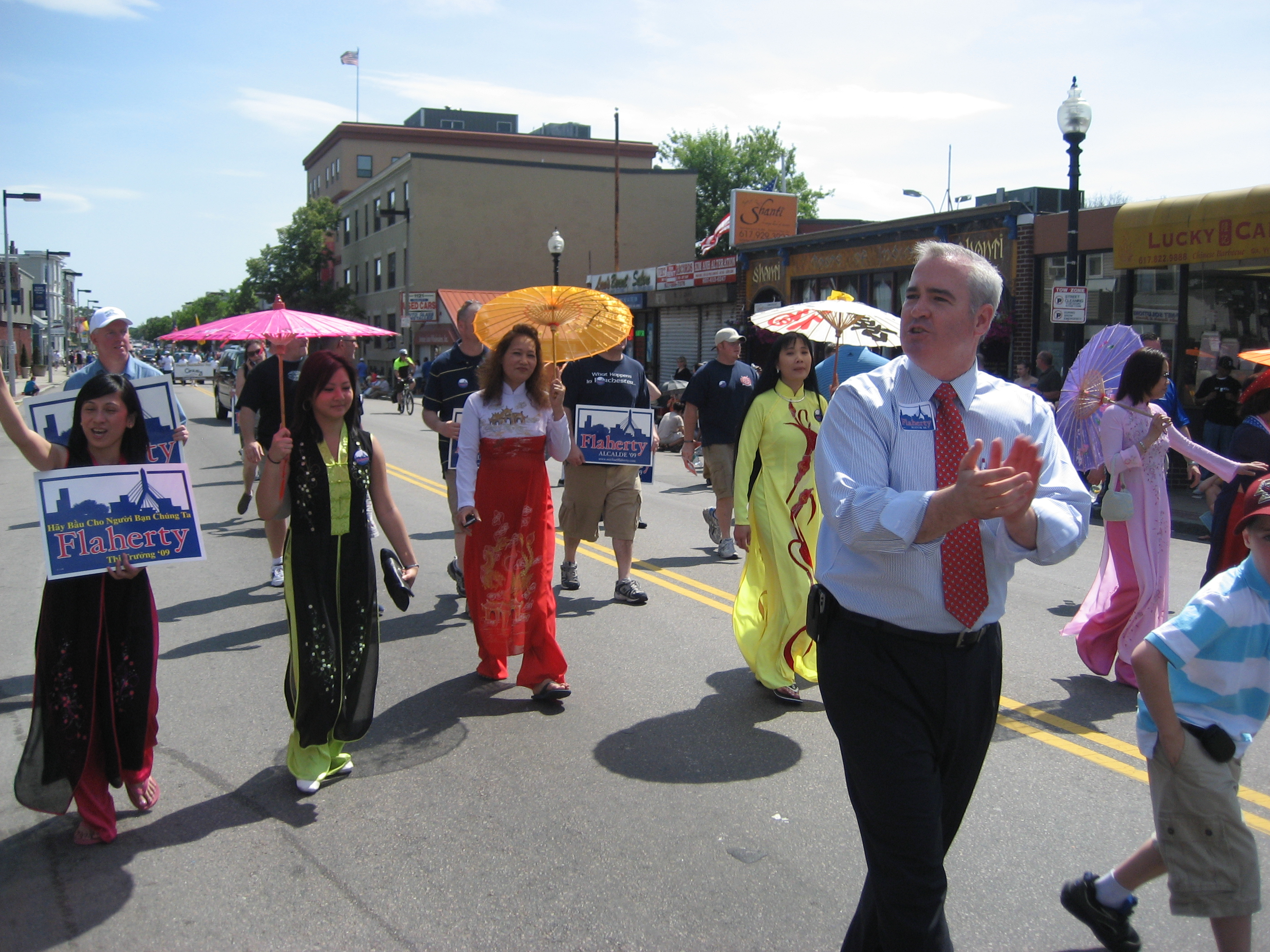
Flaherty campaigning for mayor during the 2009 Dorchester Day Parade

Flaherty announced on January 25, 2009, that he would run for mayor of Boston in that year's election. By February 2009, he had raised more than $600,000 for his campaign. According to The Boston Globe, at that time, only 9% of Flaherty's contributions came from out-of-state, compared to fellow candidate Sam Yoon's 58%. Flaherty's campaign was also supported by a number of trade unions.

Finishing second behind incumbent mayor Thomas Menino in the September primary election, Flaherty advanced to face Menino in the general election. In the general election, Flaherty pledged that he would re-create the position of deputy mayor and appoint Yoon deputy to the role. This position had not existed in Boston since the administration of Kevin White, who left office in 1984. Yoon thereafter campaigned as Flaherty's unofficial running mate.

The 2009 election was regarded to be the first time that Menino had faced a significant challenge for reelection. Flaherty had higher name-recognition and more funding than Menino's previous challengers. While he posed the strongest challenge for re-election Menino ever faced, Menino still was re-elected by a wide margin in the general election. The 57%-42% result was the narrowest of any of Menino's mayoral general election victories, but was still a double-digit victory.

== Legal practice and unsuccessful 2011 city council campaign ==
After leaving the city council, Flaherty practiced private-sector law.

In 2011, the first election since his departure from the council, Flaherty sought election to rejoin the body as an at-large member. Flaherty placed fifth in the general election for the four at-large, missing the fourth and final seat by 925 votes.

Flaherty distinguished himself from other at-large candidates in 2011 by positioning himself as a vocal critic of Mayor Menino. He alleged that the incumbents were all in the pocket of Menino. The editorial board of The Boston Globe criticized this assertion as unfounded, noting that none of the incumbent at-large councilors were products of Menino ‘s political machine, and each had gone against the mayor previously on certain issues.

In making his endorsements for the 2011 election, Sam Yoon (Flaherty's unofficial running mate from two years prior) snubbed Flaherty and instead endorsed two of his opponents. The editorial board of The Boston Globe endorsed the re-election of all four incumbents against Flaherty and other challengers, writing that while they believed Flaherty was a "bright, knowledgeable public servant", he had provided provided no persuasive reason for voters to oust any incumbents in favor of himself. The editorial board praised each incumbent as accomplished councilors, and criticized Flaherty's candidacy as lacking any political agenda besides his own opposition to Menino. After his defeat, columnist Joan Vennochi and others opined that he had not given voters any cogent reason for his candidacy, aside for his own political ambitions (including a possible desire to position himself for another mayoral candidacy in 2013).

== Second city council tenure (2014–2024) ==
=== Elections and city politics ===
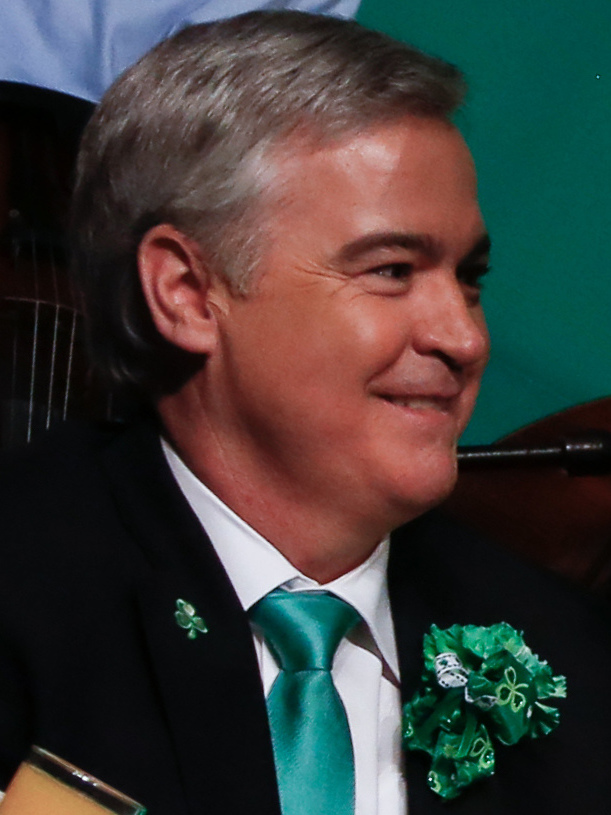
Flaherty in 2018

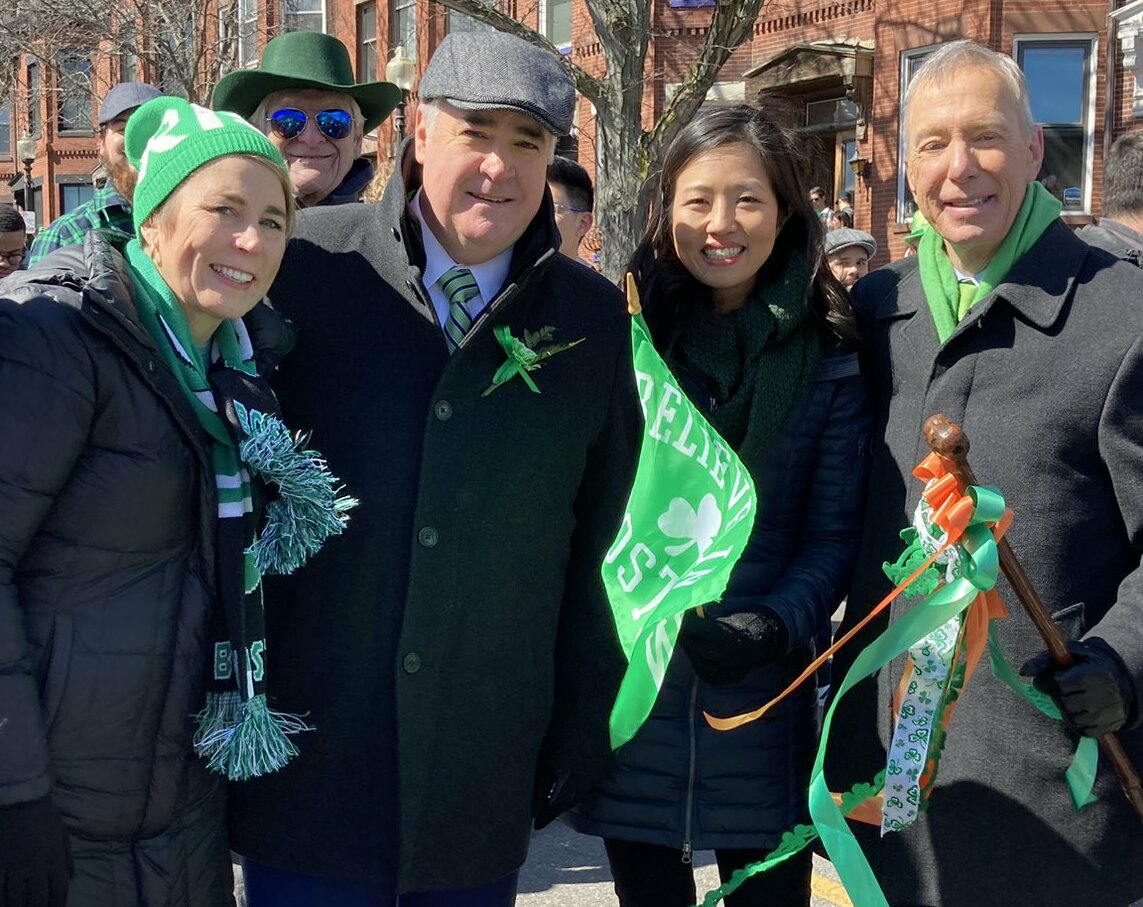
Governor Maura Healey, Flaherty, Mayor Michelle Wu, and Congressman Stephen Lynch during Boston's 2023 Saint Patrick's Day celebrations

In the November 2013 election, Flaherty was returned to the council as an at-large member. Unlike in 2011, the editorial board of The Boston Globe endorsed him in 2013. Their endorsement praised his knowledge. His campaign platform included proposals for imposing mandatory random drug tests on members of the city's police force, allowing bars in the city to remain open at later hours, and making an additional "13th year" of public education available to students needing more help.

Flaherty was reelected in November 2015, November 2017, November 2019, and November 2021. In 2021, he was the lead vote-getter in both the September primary and the general election.

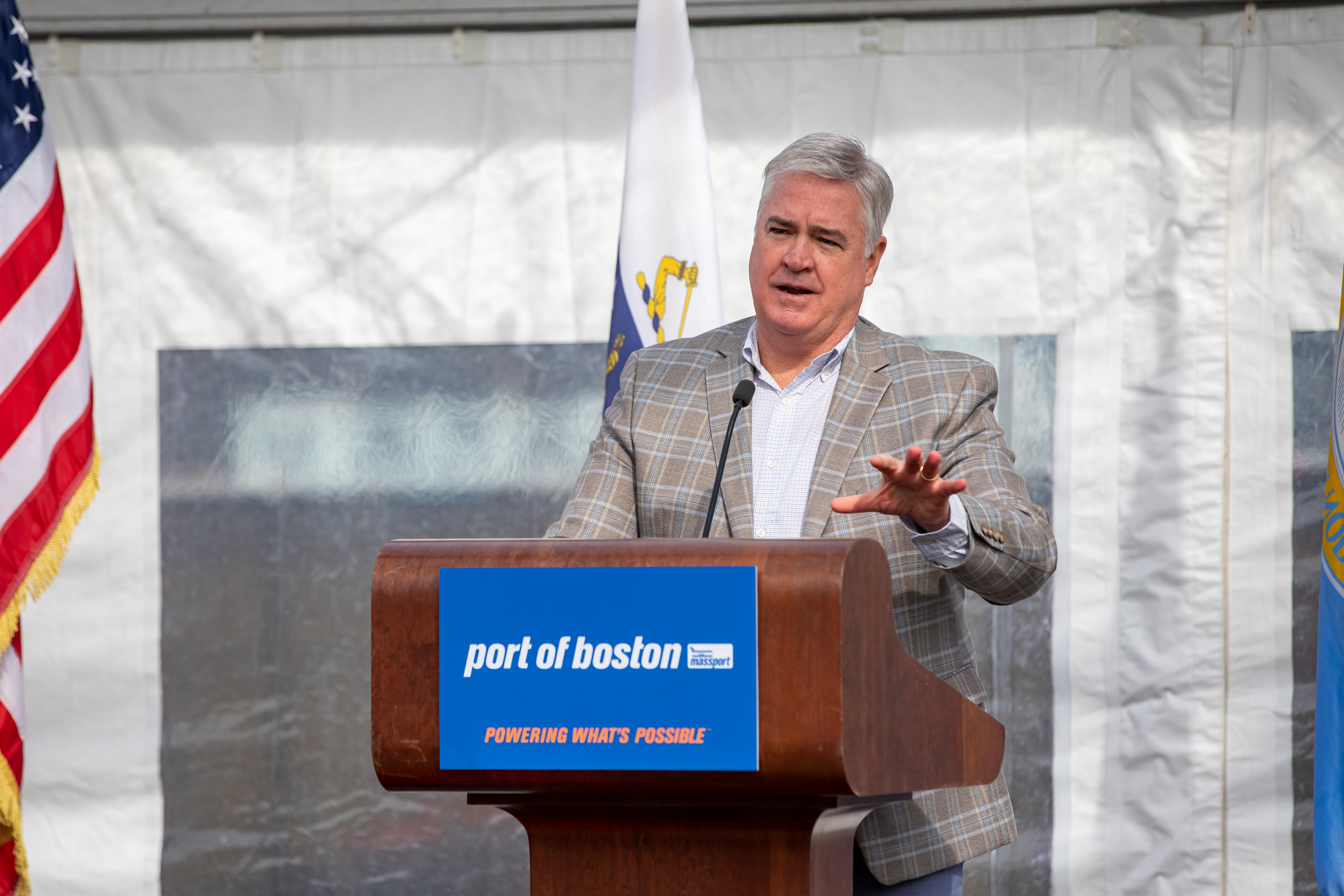
Flaherty speaking at the 2022 ribbon-cutting ceremony for the Conley Terminal modernization project

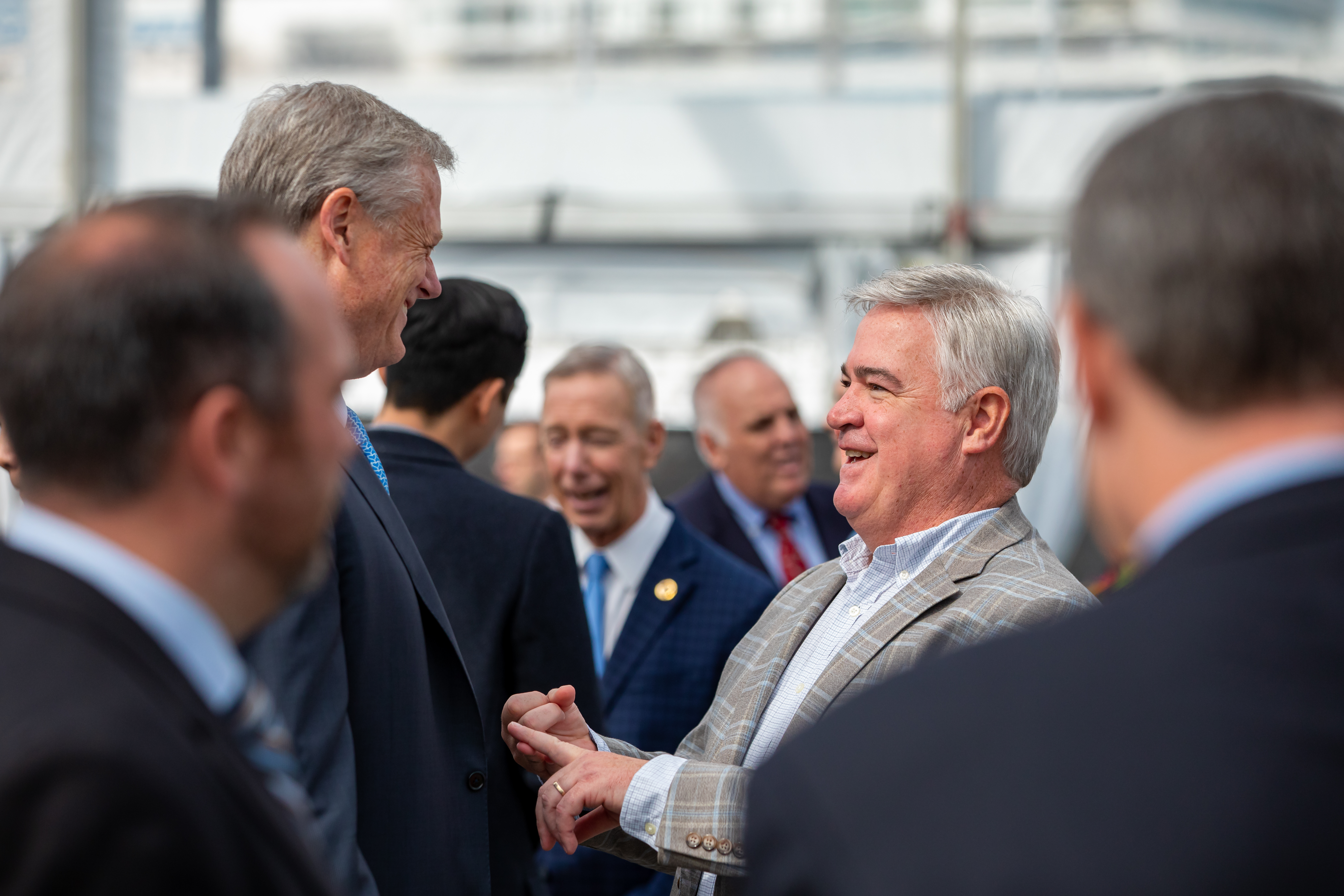
Flaherty speaks with Governor Charlie Baker at the 2022 ribbon-cutting ceremony for the Conley Terminal modernization project

In his eighth term (2018 and 2019), Flaherty served as chair of the Committee on Government Operations. In his ninth term (2020 and 2021), Flaherty served as chair of the COVID-19 Recovery Committee and vice chair of the Committee on Government Operations.

Flaherty was a member of the council's de facto voting bloc of centrist/conservative councilors, a grouping which in the 2022–23 council term also included Frank Baker, Ed Flynn, and Erin Murphy. In January 2017, David S. Bernstein of Boston magazine described Flaherty, State Senator Nick Collins, and district 2 city councilor Bill Linehan as being the three most important "southie" (South Boston) politicians.

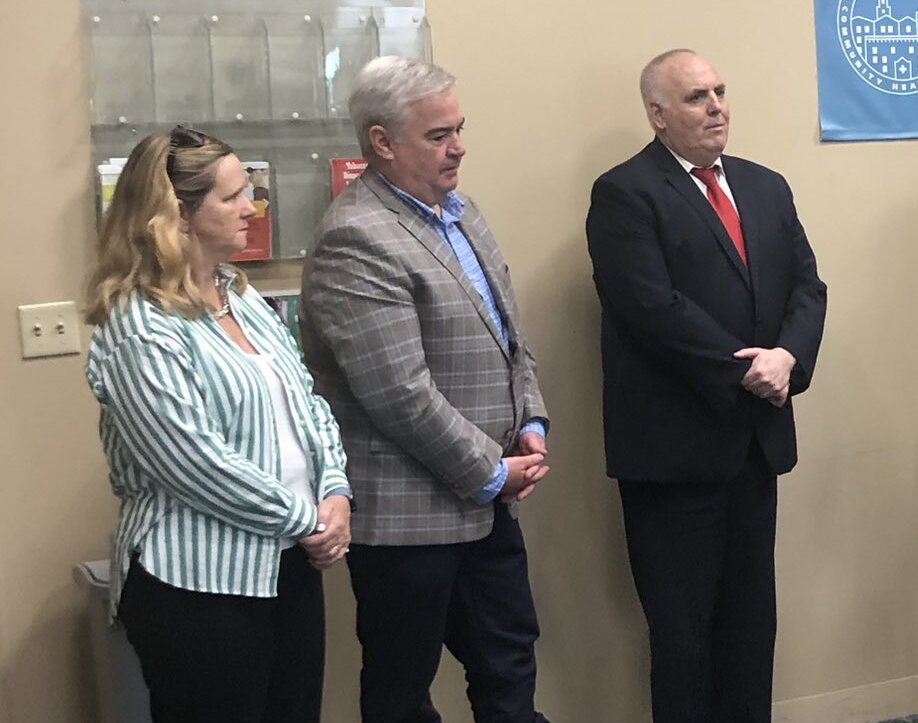
Councilors Erin Murphy, Flaherty, and Ed Flynn at the South Boston Health Center in July 2023

More than a year in advance of the 2017 Boston mayoral election, Flaherty endorsed Mayor Marty Walsh for re-election. Flaherty had considered the possibility of running in the 2021 Boston mayoral election, but did not run.

In July 2023, Flaherty announced that he would not be pursuing an additional term in office. Flaherty cited discord on the council and a desire to spend more time with his family as his motivations for retiring from the council. Flaherty has stated that he has no immediate plans of running for other office.

=== Housing ===
Flaherty worked on the Jim Brooks Act, a home-rule petition which (if approved by the state government) would have enacted a number of measures to protect tenants against eviction, including a city prohibition on no-cause evictions. The bill passed the council in October and was soon after approved by Boston Mayor Marty Walsh to be referred to the Massachusetts General Court (the state legislature) for passage. However, the legislation did not receive traction in the state legislature.

In February 2023, Flaherty expressed reservations about the rent stabilization home rule petition that Mayor Michelle Wu had sent to council. He cited the years-earlier stall in the state legislature of the Jim Brooks Act he had helped to create, Flaherty urged city council members not to pass a rent control home rule petition (which would need state approval to become law) unless there was a desire by state legislators to enact as law. He also expressed worry about the possibility that rent stabilization would put landlords with smaller property portfolios at a disadvantage in competing against those holding larger portfolios. In March 2023, when the petition came to a vote, Flaherty proposed an amendment to exempt properties or Boston-resident landlords who own fewer than six units and live within one of the units themselves. However, the amendment failed after only receiving support from three other councilors. He voted for the petition, which passed the council 11–2. He also voted the same day to advance Wu's home-rule petition to reform the Boston Planning & Development Agency, which also passed the council 11–2.

=== Other matters ===
In 2015, anticipating a possible legalization of recreational marijuana in Massachusetts, Flaherty proposed that the city adopt a text amendment prohibiting either medical marijuana dispensary or recreational sales outlets from being located within 2,500 of each other in hopes of preventing a large proliferation of marijuana sales points in any singular community.

Flaherty received media attention in April 2019 for comments he made regarding a proposal to charge for resident parking permits. In a City Council hearing on the issue, he stated that bus stop spacing and stop length were a major cause of the city's parking woes and instead suggested coordinating with the MBTA to start a conversation about removing some of them. His comments were met with backlash from the public and transportation advocates, with many pointing to his ownership of five cars in a city as the real problem. The Twitter hashtag "#FiveCarFlaherty" was used by many to voice their opposition to his comments.

In April 2021, Flaherty was among a group that voted against legislation, which was nevertheless passed by a 7–5 vote of the City Council, that restricted the use of rubber bullets, tear gas, and pepper spray by the Boston Police Department.

== Personal life ==
Flaherty has continued to reside in South Boston. Flaherty has four adult children.

== Electoral history ==
=== City Council ===
1999 Boston at-large City Council election
Candidate	Primary Election		General Election	
Francis Roache (incumbent)	21,658	19.1	30,271	18.1
Stephen J. Murphy (incumbent)	19,380	17.1	27,515	16.4
Peggy Davis-Mullen (incumbent)	16,233	14.3	26,468	15.8
Michael F. Flaherty	10,985	9.7	26,377	15.8
Dapper O'Neil (incumbent)	17,052	15.1	24,636	14.7
Gregory B. Timilty	14,429	12.7	16,068	9.6
Joseph Mulligan III	6,245	5.5	10,012	6.0
Andrea Morrell	3,329	2.9	6,093	3.6
Daniel Kontoff	2,137	1.9		
John Hugo	1,812	1.6		

2001 Boston at-large City Council election
Candidate	Votes	%
Francis Roache (incumbent)	44,062	19.0
Michael F. Flaherty (incumbent)	42,869	18.5
Maura Hennigan	40,423	17.4
Stephen J. Murphy (incumbent)	39,436	17.0
Felix D. Arroyo	28,551	12.3
Robert Consalvo	28,584	12.3
Phyllis Yetman Igoe	8,186	3.5

2003 Boston at-large City Council election
Candidate	Primary Election		General Election	
Candidate	Votes	%	Votes	%
Michael F. Flaherty (incumbent)	20,307	18.21	36,387	18.33
Felix D. Arroyo (incumbent)	14,379	12.89	34,685	17.48
Maura Hennigan (incumbent)	15,916	14.27	33,596	16.93
Stephen J. Murphy (incumbent)	17,597	15.78	30,510	15.37
Patricia H. White	16,439	14.74	29,649	14.94
Matt O'Malley	7,025	6.30	12,929	6.51
Althea Garrison	5,050	4.53	10,524	5.30
Roy Owens	4,356	3.91	10,204	5.14
Jacquelyne Payne-Thompson	2,723	2.44		
Phyllis Yetman Igoe	1,940	1.74		
Edward Puglielli	1,705	1.53		
Laura Garza	1,604	1.44		
Arthur "Lucky" Craffey	1,594	1.43		
Joseph Anthony Ureneck	907	0.81		

2005 Boston at-large City Council election
Candidate	Primary election		General election	
Candidate	Votes	%	Votes	%
Michael F. Flaherty (incumbent)	17,828	13.90	49,220	17.58
Felix D. Arroyo (incumbent)	15,690	12.23	43,533	15.55
Sam Yoon	13,165	10.27	41,891	14.96
Stephen J. Murphy (incumbent)	14,094	10.99	35,553	12.70
John R. Connolly	14,287	11.14	31,629	11.30
Matt O'Malley	12,070	9.41	28,318	10.12
Patricia H. White	12,895	10.05	26,999	9.64
Edward M. Flynn	11,092	8.65	21,778	7.78
Althea Garrison	4824	3.76		
Kevin R. McCrea	3661	2.85		
Roy Owens	3622	2.82		
Laura Garza	1807	1.41		
Gregory Joseph O'Connell	1174	0.92		
Martin J. Hogan	1031	0.80		
Joseph Ready	675	0.53		
Joseph Ureneck	17†	0.01	133†	0.05
Gibran Rivera	17†	0.01		
all others	297	0.23	874	0.31

† write-in votes

2007 Boston at-large City Council election
Candidates	Votes	%
Michael F. Flaherty (incumbent)	25,863	20.57
Stephen J. Murphy (incumbent)	23,659	18.82
Sam Yoon (incumbent)	23,230	18.48
John R. Connolly	21,997	17.50
Felix D. Arroyo	18,579	4.78
Martin J. Hogan	4,008	3.19
Matthew Geary	3,030	2.41%
William P. Estrada	2,439	1.94%
David James Wyatt	2,383	1.90%
Scattering	542	0.43%

2011 Boston at-large City Council election
Candidates	Votes	%
Ayanna Pressley (incumbent)	37,532	21.42
Felix G. Arroyo (incumbent)	35,483	20.25
John R. Connolly (incumbent)	32,827	18.74
Stephen J. Murphy (incumbent)	26,730	15.26
Michael F. Flaherty	25,805	14.73%
Will Dorcena	8,739	4.99%
Sean H. Ryan	7,376	4.21%

2013 Boston at-large City Council election
Candidate	Primary election		General election	
Candidate	Votes	%	Votes	%
Ayanna Pressley (incumbent)	42,915	16.71	60,799	18.30
Michelle Wu	29,384	11.44	59,741	17.98
Michael F. Flaherty	39,904	15.54	55,104	16.59
Stephen J. Murphy (incumbent)	31,728	12.35	44,993	13.54
Annissa Essaibi George	12,244	4.77	30,538	9.19
Jeffrey Ross	13,939	5.43	28,879	8.69
Martin Keogh	15,743	6.13	26,500	7.98
Jack Kelly III	11,909	4.64	23,967	7.22
Catherine O'Neill	10,952	4.26		
Althea Garrison	10,268	4.00		
Ramon Soto	9,928	3.87		
Philip Frattaroli	5,832	2.27		
Gareth Saunders	5,363	2.09		
Christopher Conroy	3,433	1.34		
Seamus Whelan	3,118	1.21		
Francisco White	2,745	1.07		
Douglas Wohn	2,382	0.93		
Frank Addivinola Jr.	2,240	0.87		
Keith Kenyon	1,950	0.76		
Jamarhl Crawford	21†	0.01		
all others	832	0.32	1,658	0.50

† write-in votes

2015 Boston at-large City Council election
Candidate	Votes	%
Ayanna Pressley (incumbent)	31,783	24.21
Michelle Wu (incumbent)	28,908	22.02
Michael F. Flaherty (incumbent)	26,473	20.16
Annissa Essaibi George	23,447	17.86
Stephen J. Murphy (incumbent)	19,546	14.89
Jovan Lacet write-in	95	0.07
Charles Yancey write-in	39	0.03
Jean-Claud Sanon write-in	25	0.02
Andrea Campbell write-in	13	0.01
all others	959	0.73

2017 Boston at-large City Council election
Candidate	Votes	%
Michelle Wu (incumbent)	65,040	24.47
Ayanna Pressley (incumbent)	57,520	21.64
Michael F. Flaherty (incumbent)	51,673	19.44
Annissa Essaibi George (incumbent)	45,564	17.14
Althea Garrison	1,825	6.87
Domingos DaRosa	11,647	4.38
William King	8,773	3.30
Pat Payaso	6,124	2.30
all others	1,230	0.46

2019 Boston at-large City Council election
Candidate	Primary election		General election	
Candidate	Votes	%	Votes	%
Michelle Wu (incumbent)	26,622	19.41	41,664	20.73
Annissa Essaibi George (incumbent)	18,993	13.85	34,109	16.97
Michael F. Flaherty (incumbent)	18,766	13.68	33,284	16.56
Julia Mejia	10,799	7.87	22,492	11.19
Alejandra St. Guillen	11,910	8.68	22,491	11.19
Erin Murphy	9,385	6.84	16,867	8.39
Althea Garrison (incumbent)	9,720	7.09	16,189	8.05
David Halbert	6,354	4.76	13,214	6.57
Martin Keogh	6,246	4.55		
Jeffrey Ross	5,078	3.70		
Priscilla Flint-Banks	4,094	2.98		
Domingos DaRosa	2,840	2.07		
Michel Denis	2,108	1.54		
William King	1,809	1.32		
Herb Lozano	1,510	1.10		
all others	766	0.56	704	0.35

2021 Boston City Council at-large election
Candidate	Primary election		General election	
Candidate	Votes	%	Votes	%
Michael F. Flaherty (incumbent)	41,299	15.0	62,606	17.4
Julia Mejia (incumbent)	38,765	14.1	62,058	17.3
Ruthzee Louijeune	33,425	12.2	54,898	15.3
Erin Murphy	22,835	8.3	43,076	12.0
David Halbert	16,921	6.2	42,765	11.9
Carla Monteiro	18,844	6.9	39,876	11.1
Bridget Nee-Walsh	15,118	5.5	27,591	7.7
Althea Garrison	16,810	6.1	25,078	7.0
Kelly Bates	12,735	4.6		
Alexander Gray	11,263	4.1		
Jon Spillane	11,155	4.1		
Said Abdikarim	7,725	2.8		
Domingos DaRosa	7,139	2.6		
Donnie Dionico Palmer Jr.	6,823	2.5		
Roy A. Owens Sr	5,223	1.9		
James Rignald Colimon	4,671	1.7		
Nick Vance	3,943	1.4		
Write-ins	845	0.3	1,350	0.4
Total	274,694	100	359,294	100

=== Mayoral ===
2009 Boston mayoral election
Candidates	Preliminary election		General election	
Candidates	Votes	%	Votes	%
Thomas Menino (incumbent)	41,026	50.52	63,123	57.27
Michael F. Flaherty	19,459	23.96	46,768	42.43
Sam Yoon	17,179	21.16		
Kevin McCrea	3,340	4.11		

Preceded by Charles Yancey	President of the Boston City Council; 2002–2006	Succeeded by Maureen Feeney
