= Stephen J. Murphy =

American politician

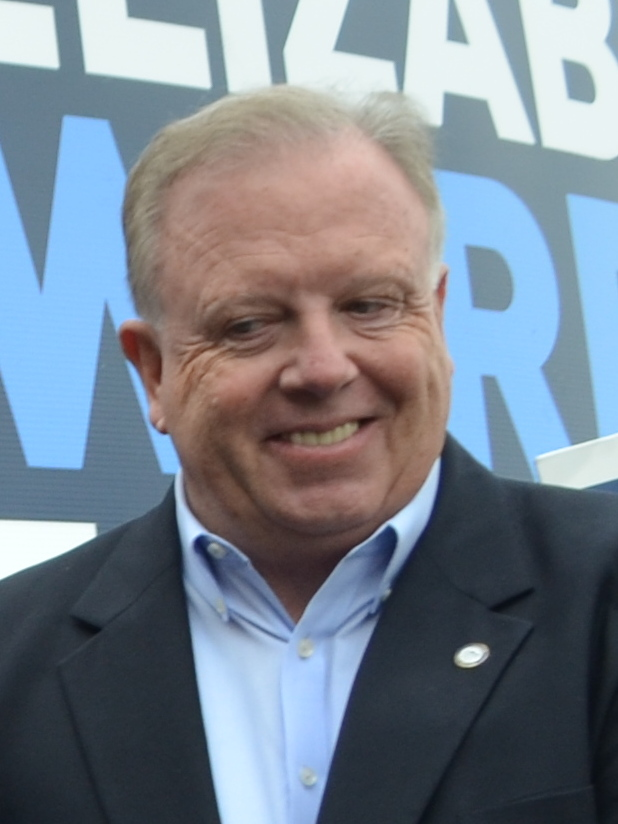
- Murphy in 2012

31st Suffolk County Register of Deeds
- Incumbent
- Assumed office November 2016

President of the Boston City Council
- In office January 2011 – January 2013
- Preceded by: Michael P. Ross
- Succeeded by: Bill Linehan

At-large member of the Boston City Council
- In office 1997–2016
- Preceded by: Richard P. Iannella
- Succeeded by: Annissa Essaibi George

Personal details
- Party: Democratic

Stephen J. Murphy is an American politician who has served as Suffolk County's register of deeds, since 2017. From 1997 until 2016, he served as an at-large member of the Boston City Council. He was president of the council in 2011 and 2012. He is a member of the Democratic Party.

== Early life, education, and early career ==
Born in Dorchester and raised in Hyde Park. His mother, Marjorie, worked as a teacher’s aide for Boston Public Schools. His father, Stephen, was an attorney and a former Boston Police Department officer.

Murphy graduated high school at Boston Latin School. He graduated college with a degree in business administration from Stonehill College.

Murphy worked for a transit company, eventually being promoted up to vice president. He held this job until the mid 1980s, when he began working in state government.

== Early government work and politics ==
In the mid-1980s, Murphy began working in state government. He first worked in the State Senate as Director of Constituent Services for Senate President William M. Bulger and then worked on budget matters in the Massachusetts Attorney General's Office. He next worked as the Assistant Personnel Director of the Massachusetts Secretary of the Commonwealth's Office.

Murphy's first campaign for public office was an unsuccessful campaign for the Boston School Committee.

== Boston City Council (1997–2016) ==
From February 1997 until January 2016, Murphy was an at-large member of the Boston City Council. After serving a partial term on the council in 1997, he served nine two-year terms.

During his time on the council, he served three years as council president (three consecutive one-year terms in 2011, 2012, and 2013).

=== Unsuccessful 1995 candidacy; partial term in 1997 ===
Murphy had finished fifth in the November 1995 race for four at-large seats, failing to win election. However, in February 1997, Richard P. Iannella resigned his at-large seat after being elected Suffolk County register of probate. Since Boston's charter offers the first-runner-up in the at-large election the right of first refusal to assume any vacant at-large seats, Murphy was able to assume the seat vacated by Ianella and complete his term.

Served as chair of the Committee on Public Safety during this first term. As committee chair, he led hearings where he and other council members probed matter of underage drinking college students and means of closing de facto loopholes that facilitated the purchase of alcohol by those under the legal drinking age.

=== Second third, and fourth terms (1998–2003) ===
Murphy elected to a full two-year term as an at-large councilor in November 1997. He would go on to be re-elected eight times thereafter, including to a third term in 1999 and a fourth term in in 2001.

==== 2002 Massachusetts Treasurer campaign ====
Murphy ran unsuccessfully ran for Massachusetts treasurer.

=== Fifth term (2004–05) ===
Murphy was re-elected to a fifth term in 2003.

In 2004, Murphy issued a proposal to restructure the way universities reimburse the city for services, urging for them to pay the city more.

In an effort to decrease excessive alcohol consumption, particularly by Boston-area university students, Murphy proposed an ordinance to require Boston liquor stores to require not just proof of identification but also proof of address for keg sales, and to report the name, age, and addresses of all keg purchasers to the Boston Police Department. It was hoped that, if enacted, this would allow police to counter parties with underage drinking.

==== 2004 Suffolk County Sheriff campaign ====
Murphy unsuccessfully ran for Suffolk County Sheriff in 2004.

=== Sixth term (2006–07) ===
Murphy was re-elected to a sixth term in 2005.

Steve Murphy, as committee chair, called for changes to smoke detector laws.

Murphy opposed a lateral transfer initiative for the police department. As a councilor, Murphy also worked over the years with Mayor Menino to expand the hiring of new police officers and firemen.

Murphy sponsored the city's CORI reform ordinance.

Murphy was an early endorser of Deval Patrick's candidacy in the 2006 Massachusetts gubernatorial election.

=== Seventh council term (2008–09) ===
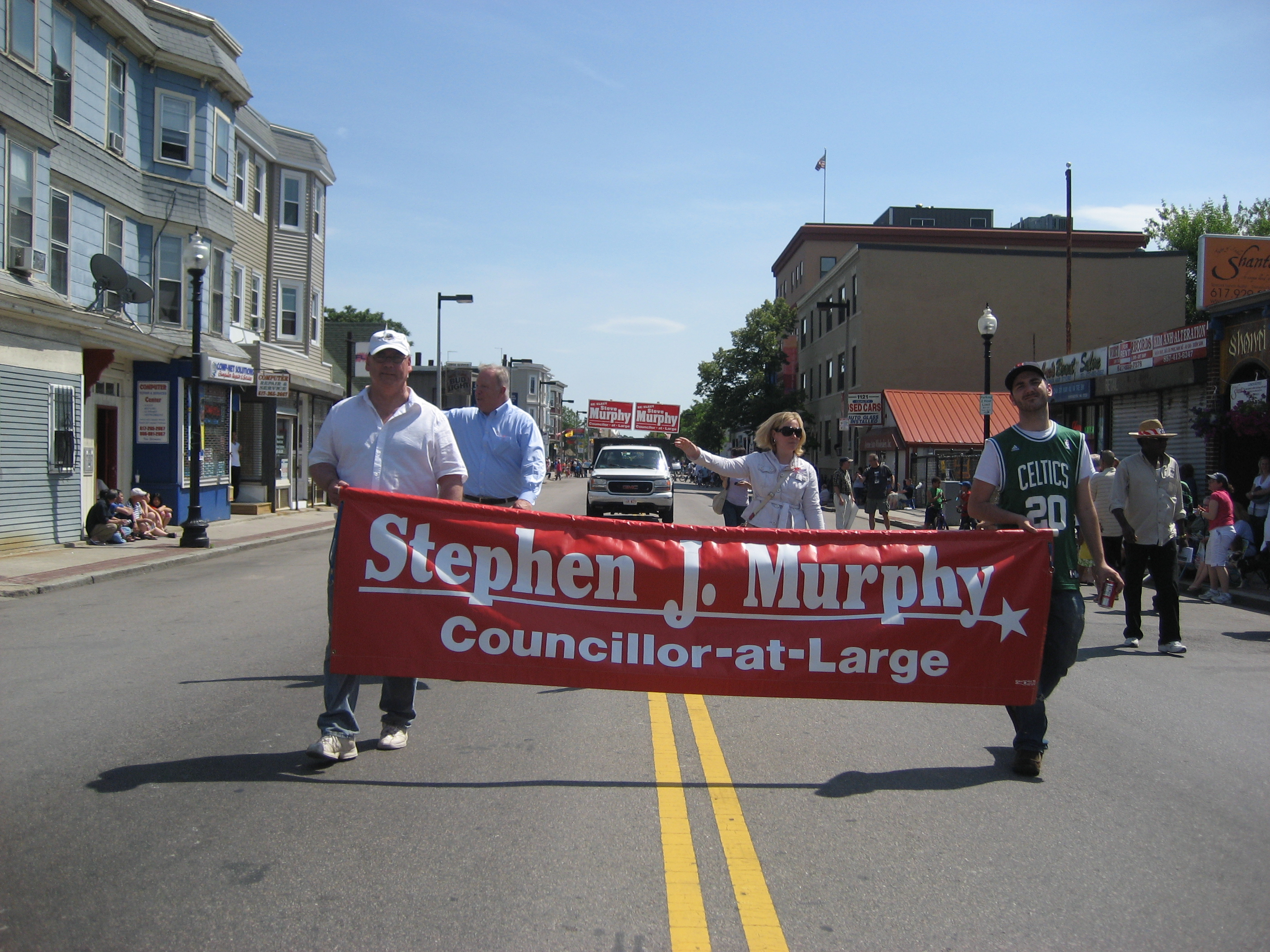
Murphy marching with supporters in the 2009 Dorchester Day Parade

Murphy was re-elected to a seventh term in 2007.

=== Eighth council term (2010–11), first term as council president (2011) ===
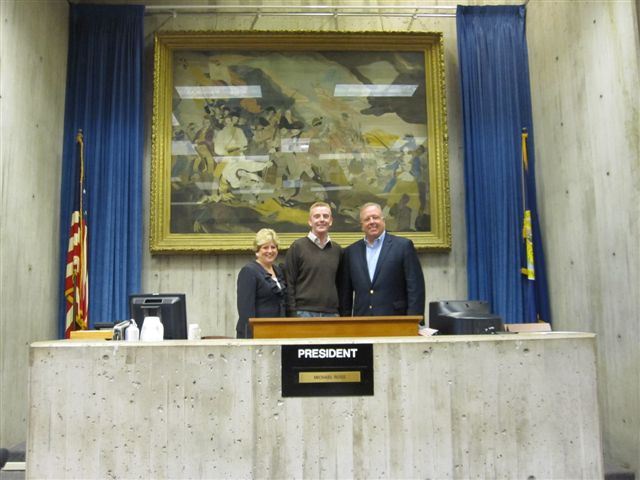
2010 photograph of Murphy in the council chamber with fellow councilor Maureen Feeney (left) and Irish politician Derek Nolan (center)

Murphy was re-elected to an eighth term in 2009.

During his eight council term, Murphy served two terms as president of the Boston City Council, with Salvatore LaMattina serving as the council's vice president.

Murphy and Councilor Michael P. Ross filed an ordinance in December 2011 that would have prevented the city clerk from collecting fees from the filing of wedding certificates.

==== 2010 Massachusetts Treasurer campaign ====
Murphy unsuccessfully ran in 2010 for Massachusetts treasurer, failing to secure the Democratic nomination.

=== Ninth council term, second and third terms as council president (2012–13) ===
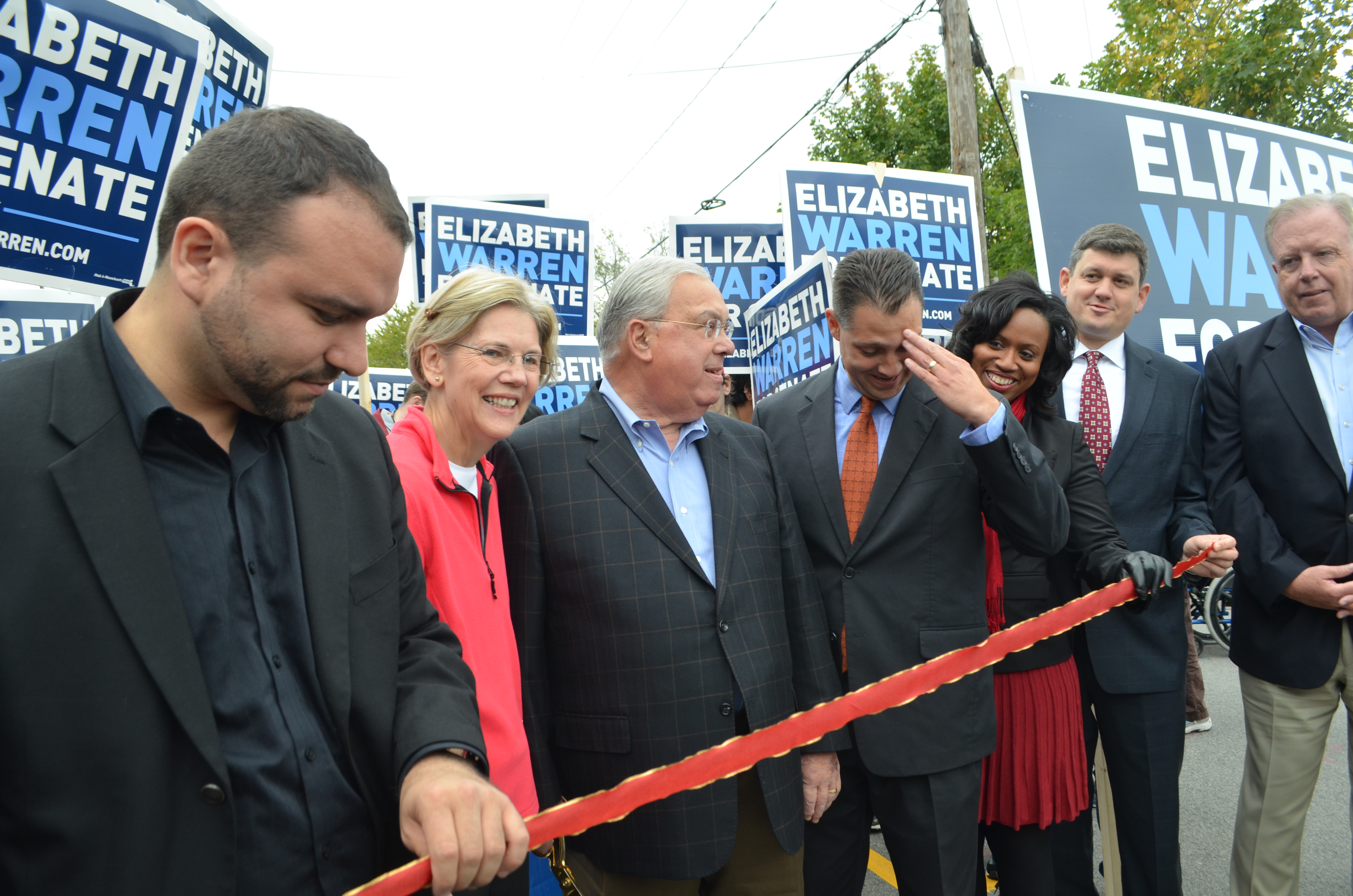
Murphy (far right) at the 2012 East Boston Columbus Day Parade with other politicians, including Felix G. Arroyo, Elizabeth Warren, Thomas Menino, Ayanna Pressley, and John R. Connolly

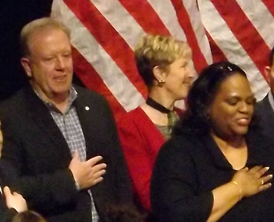
Murphy (standing beside Suzanne M. Bump and Andrea Cabral), in 2013 at a local ceremonial swearing-in event for U.S. Senator Elizabeth Warren

Murphy was re-elected to a ninth council term in 2011.

In late-December 2012, Murphy announced he had secured pledges of enough votes to secure a third term as council president, and on January 7, 2013, he was re-elected to serve an additional one-year term as council president. With Mayor Thomas Menino's health publicly known to be ailing by 2013, this final council president term of Murphy was seen as carrying greater-than-usual potential odds of seeing him ascend to the mayoralty (Boston's council presidents are first-in-line to serve as acting mayor in the case of mayoralty vacancies). However, Murphy expressed public confidence in January that not only would Menino finish his current term, but would also seek re-election. Murphy was successful in securing his third council presidency term.

Murphy was a champion of the cancelled Indigo Line transit project, hailing transit oriented development he expected to see arise around eight planned stations between Hyde Park and Back Bay. He touted that this development could provide needed additional affordable housing to the city.

In late 2012, Murphy sponsored an unsuccessful ordinance to redirect many 911 calls from triggering a police response to instead triggering a firefighter EMS response.

In 2013, introduced an ordinance to ban anyone under 18 from attending UFC events held in the city. The propped ordinance attracted criticism from prominent UFC figures, including its President Dana White, and was defeated.

In 2013, Murphy openly considered running for mayor after Mayor Menino made a surprise announcement in late March that he would not be seeking re-election to the office. A crowded field was emerging. With an April 17 filing deadline, Murphy had a very limited timeline to decide whether he would run for mayor. A mayoral campaign would likely have meant forgoing a run for a tenth consecutive in the simultaneous council election. A run for mayor would also likely have prevented Murphy from fieding a bid for state treasurer in 2014, as if elected he would take office as mayor that year, and if he ran but lost he might have trouble recovering from the blow of a mayoral election defeat. However, if he were re-elected to the city council, he would be preserving his chances of fielding a formidable 2014 state treasurer run.

At the start of April, Murphy noted that he feared the possibility that he could come to regret not running if Menino were to resign early from the mayoralty prior to the election (but too late for Murphy to launch a ballot-qualified candidacy); noting that an early resignation would make him (as council president) the new acting mayor, and that (if a candidate) he could leverage the advantages of an acting mayoral incumbency to boost his prospects of being elected mayor (Menino himself had who would be rendered a mere caretaker mayor (a "footnote in Boston history", per Murphy’s description) if he became acting mayor but was not able to be elected mayor in the election following.

Murphy ruled-out running for mayor, and instead sought re-election to the council

=== Tenth council term (2014–15) ===
Murphy was re-elected to a tenth term in 2013.

In re-election his campaign, he billed himself as, "a steady hand moving forward."

The editorial board of The Boston Globe did not endorse him in 2013, instead endorsing incumbent councilor Ayanna Pressley, former councilor Michael Flaherty, and first-time candidates Michelle Wu and Jack Kelly. While praising his knowledge of the city budget, the editorial board described him as appearing "more annoyed than invigorated as of late by the challenges of the office," and having "also shown a tendency towards politically expedient decisions."

In 2014, Murphy pushed for Boston to revive its mounted police unit.

In 2015, Murphy co-sponsored BYOB ordinance with Councilor Wu, which allowed allowed patrons of certain restaurants without liquor licenses to bring their own outside bottles of alcoholic beverage to drink with their meal. He and Wu cited the success of a similar ordinance in Philadelphia in their advocacy for this policy, arguing that it would advantage neighborhood restaurants in Boston unable to secure one of the city's scarce liquor licenses.

=== Defeat in 2015 council election ===
Murphy lost his seat in the November 2015 election. As the fifth place finisher in the at-large election, he would have had the first right of refusal to rejoin the council if any at-large seat vacancies had occurred during the 2016–17 council term. This circumstance did not arise, however,

== Suffolk County Register of Deeds (2016–present) ==
=== Elections ===
In 2016, Murphy won a four-way primary for the Democratic nomination for Suffolk County register of deeds.

In November 2016, Murphy won the general election by a broad margin over three independent challengers, and took office later that same month.

Murphy has twice won re-election to further terms as register, first in 2018 and later in 2024. His 2018 re-election saw him fend off another challenge by Katherine Forde in the Democratic primary, with Murphy receiving 52.7% of votes and Forde receiving 47.3% of votes. Similar to 2016, he once again had no Republican challenger in the general election. He won the general election with a result similar to his first election, receiving 70.7% of votes, with a vast lead over the 12.5% of votes received by his sole ballot-listed challenger (an independent candidate). The remaining 16.8% of votes being tallied for a scattering of various write-ins. In his 2024 re-election, Murphy was unchallenged in both the Democratic primary and the general election, winning more than 98% of votes tallied in each (with the remainder of votes being for a scattering of write-ins).

=== Tenure ===
Murphy created a Traveling Tuesdays program which sees members of the registry staff spend their Tuesdays at community availabilities in miscellaneous Suffolk County locations with aims of increasing local awareness of the office and its functions.

== Electoral history ==
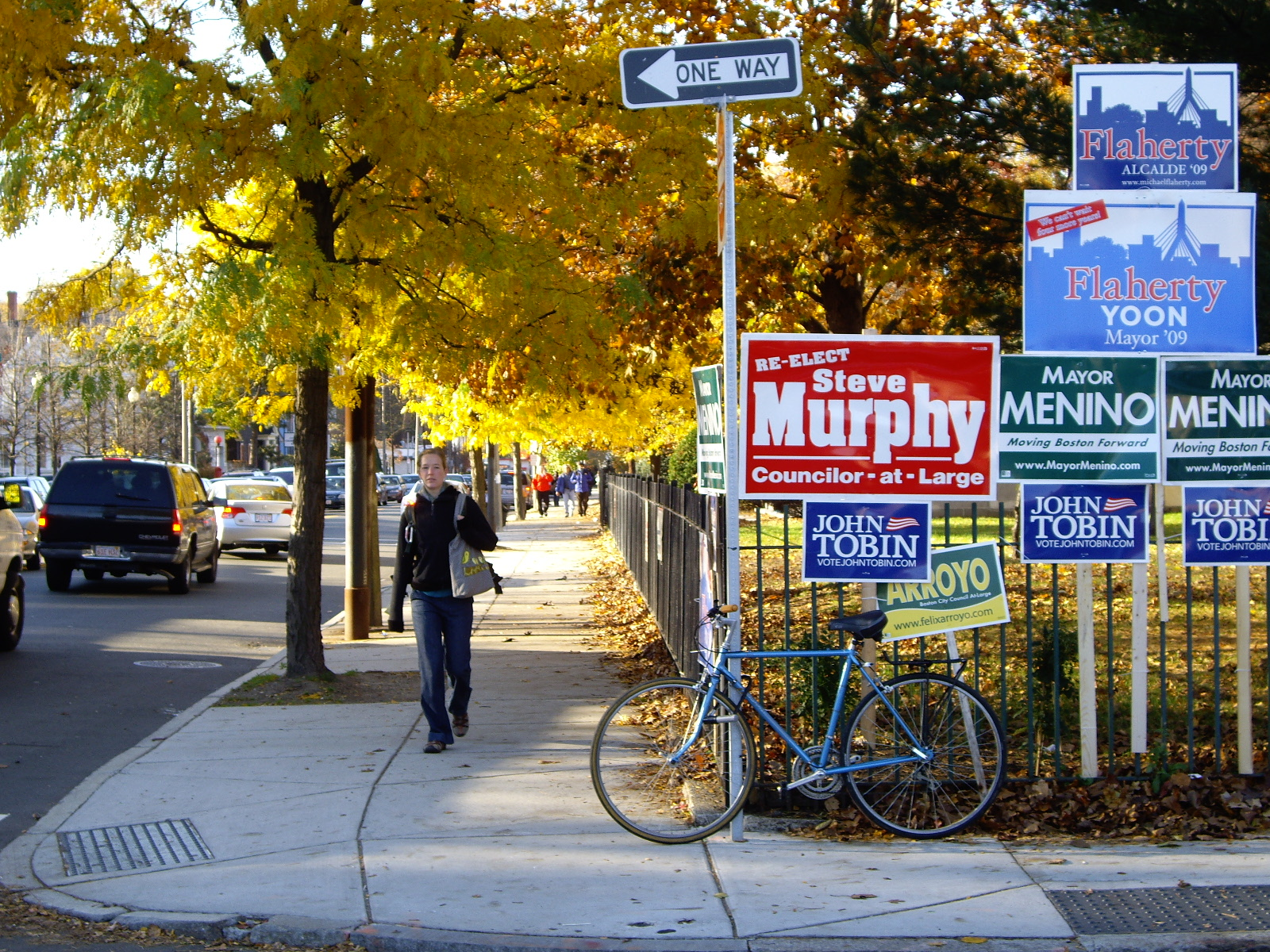
A sign for Murphy's 2009 re-election campaign sits among other 2009 city election campaign signs

=== City Council elections ===
1995 Boston City Council election (at-large seats)
Candidates	Preliminary election		General election	
Candidates	Votes	%	Votes	%
Francis Roache	18,963	13.5	30,985	16.2
Dapper O'Neil (incumbent)	22,333	15.9	30,524	15.9
Richard P. Iannella (incumbent)	17,970	12.8	28,431	14.8
Peggy Davis-Mullen (incumbent)	17,964	12.8	23,913	12.5
Stephen J. Murphy†	14,255	10.1	21,571	11.3
Michael F. Flaherty	14,368	10.2	20,215	10.5
Frank N. Jones	6,960	5.0	20,047	10.5
Paul J. Gannon	11,724	8.3	16,012	8.4
Anthony Crayton	5,299	3.8		
Joseph P. Donnelly	3,188	2.3		
Dick Czubinski	1,885	1.3		
Edgar Williams Jr.	1,568	1.1		
Anthony L. Dantona	1,372	1.0		
Matthew D. Malloy	1,359	1.0		
Maceo Carl Dixon	1,334	0.9		

† Richard P. Iannella was elected Register of Probate of Suffolk County in November 1996, and subsequently resigned his council seat; Stephen J. Murphy, who had finished fifth in the general election for four seats, joined the council in February 1997 and served the remainder of Iannella's term.

1997 Boston City Council election (at-large seats)
Candidates	Preliminary election		General election		Recount	
Candidates	Votes	%	Votes	%	Votes	%
Francis Roache (incumbent)	17,495	18.4	32,029	16.9		
Peggy Davis-Mullen (incumbent)	12,116	12.8	28,280	14.9		
Dapper O'Neil (incumbent)	14,310	15.1	27,591	14.6		
Stephen J. Murphy (incumbent)	15,247	16.1	26,702	14.1	26,736	
Suzanne Iannella	11,325	11.9	26,505	14.0	26,561	
Frank N. Jones	9,912	10.4	24,892	13.1		
Paul J. Gannon	9,292	9.8	17,131	9.0		
Pamela A. Smith	2,700	2.8	6,287	3.3		
Anthony A. Schinella	2,505	2.6				

1999 Boston City Council election (at-large seats)
Candidates	Preliminary election		General election	
Candidates	Votes	%	Votes	%
Francis Roache (incumbent)	21.648	19.1	30,271	18.1
Stephen J. Murphy (incumbent)	19,623	17.3	27,515	16.4
Peggy Davis-Mullen (incumbent)	16,198	14.3	26,468	15.8
Michael F. Flaherty	14,422	12.7	26,377	15.8
Dapper O'Neil (incumbent)	17,237	15.2	24,636	14.7
Gregory B. Timilty	10,876	9.6	16,068	9.6
Joseph Mulligan III	6.111	5.4	10,012	6.0
Andrea Morrell	3,338	2.9	6,093	3.6
Daniel Kontoff	2,004	1.8		
John Hugo	1,790	1.6		

=== Suffolk County Register of Deeds elections ===
2016 Suffolk County Register of Deeds election
Party	Candidate	Votes	%
Democratic	Stephen Murphy	180,667	71.74
Independent	Margherita Ciampa-Coyne	32,689	12.98
Independent	John Keith	18,576	7.38
Independent	Joseph Donnelly	18,222	7.36
Total votes		251,839	100
	blank votes	65,368	

2018 Suffolk County Register of Deeds Democratic primary
Party	Candidate	Votes	%
Democratic	Stephen Murphy (incumbent)	42,040	52.7
Democratic	Katherine Forde	157,284	47.3
Total votes		79,755	100

2018 Suffolk County Register of Deeds election
Party	Candidate	Votes	%
Democratic	Stephen Murphy (incumbent)	180,208	70.7
Independent	Gabriela Mendoza	31,779	12.5
write-in	other	42,855	16.8
Total votes		254,842	100

2024 Suffolk County Register of Deeds Democratic primary
Party	Candidate	Votes	%
Democratic	Stephen Murphy (incumbent)	47,907	98.8
write-in	other	602	1.2
Total votes		48,509	100

2024 Suffolk County Register of Deeds election
Party	Candidate	Votes	%
Democratic	Stephen Murphy (incumbent)	223,614	98.1
write-in	other	4,435	1.2
Total votes		228,049	100

=== Other elections ===
2002 Massachusetts Treasurer and Receiver-General Democratic Party primary
Party	Candidate	Votes	%
Democratic	Timothy P. Cahill	226,505	35.79
Democratic	Jim Segel	153,940	24.33
Democratic	Stephen J. Murphy	135,612	21.43
Democratic	Michael P. Cahill	116,737	18.45

2010 Massachusetts Treasurer and Receiver-General Democratic Party primary
Party	Candidate	Votes	%
Democratic	Steven Grossman	245,386	60.78
Democratic	Stephen J. Murphy	157,284	38.96
Write-in		1,071	0.26

Preceded by Michael P. Ross	President of the Boston City Council; 2011–2013	Succeeded by Bill Linehan
