= John M. Tobin Jr. =

Former politician

Member of the Boston City Council from the 6th district
- In office January 2002 – August 2010
- Preceded by: Maura Hennigan
- Succeeded by: Matt O'Malley

Personal details
- Born: August 31, 1969 (age 57) Boston, Massachusetts, U.S.
- Party: Democratic
- Spouse: Kate Plunkett
- Children: 2
- Education: UMass Boston

John M. Tobin Jr. (born August 31, 1969) is a former member of the Boston City Council, having represented District 6 from 2002 through 2010. His district included the neighborhoods of West Roxbury, Jamaica Plain, and parts of Roslindale and Mission Hill. His has been the Vice President of City and Community Affairs at Northeastern University since 2010. He also co-founded Off Cabot in Beverly, MA.

== Early years ==
Tobin was born in Boston on August 31, 1969. He is the son of Jack and Kathy (Freeman) Tobin and is the oldest of six children. He grew up in Dorchester's Lower Mills neighborhood and in West Roxbury. Tobin attended the Charles H. Taylor Elementary School in Mattapan, St. Gregory's School in Dorchester, and Holy Name School in West Roxbury. He is a 1987 graduate of Catholic Memorial High School in West Roxbury. Tobin received his Bachelor of Arts degree in Political Science from the University of Massachusetts Boston.

== Boston City Council ==
Tobin was an unsuccessful candidate for the District 6 seat on the Boston City Council in 1995 and 1999, losing both times to incumbent Maura Hennigan. In November 2001, when Hennigan ran for (and won) an at-large seat on the council, Tobin won the District 6 seat. He was re-elected four times, the final time being in November 2009. In August 2010, Tobin resigned his council seat to take a position as vice president for City and Community Affairs at Northeastern University.

During his tenure, Tobin chaired the council's committee on Arts, Film, Humanities & Tourism, a post he held since 2002. As of May 2009, he served as Vice Chair of the Post Audit & Oversight Committee, and the Presidential Committee on Council Centennial. He was a member of six other committees.

== Personal life ==
Tobin resides in West Roxbury with his wife, Kate (née Plunkett), and their sons, Matthew and Daniel.
