= 2009 Boston mayoral election =

Election in Massachusetts, United States

- November 3, 2009
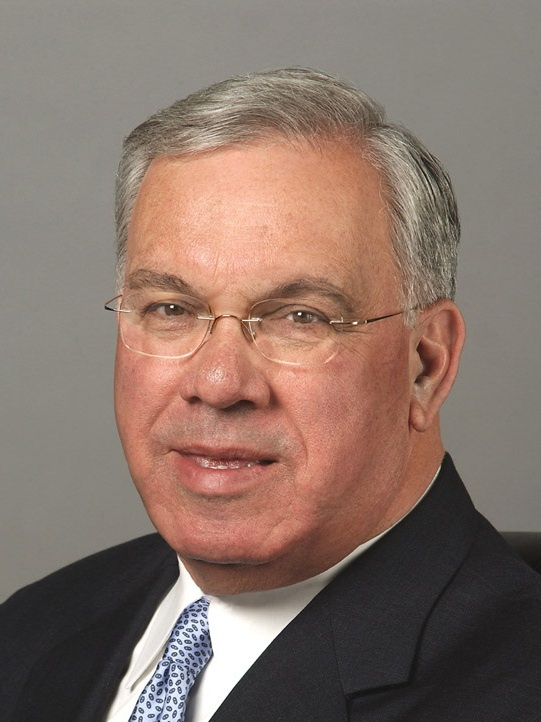

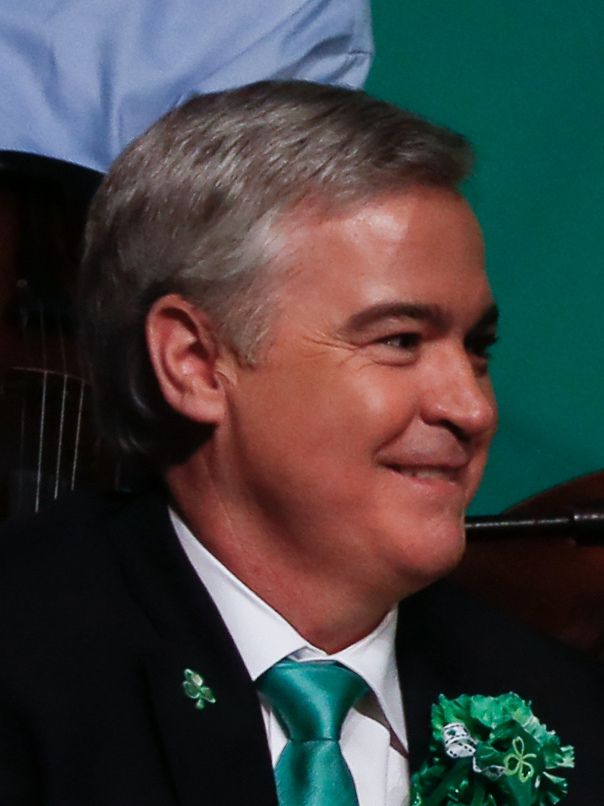
Candidate	Thomas Menino	Michael F. Flaherty
Party	Nonpartisan	Nonpartisan
Popular vote	63,123	46,768
Percentage	57.27%	42.43%
- Menino: 50–60% 60–70% 70–80% 80–90% Flaherty: 50–60% 60–70% 70–80% Tie: 40–50%
Mayor before election
Thomas Menino
Elected mayor
Thomas Menino

The 2009 Boston mayoral election occurred on Tuesday, November 3, 2009, between incumbent Mayor of Boston Thomas Menino, and Michael F. Flaherty, member of the Boston City Council and former Council president. Menino was re-elected to a fifth term, the first mayor to do so in Boston history. A nonpartisan municipal preliminary election was held on September 22, 2009, where Flaherty and Menino advanced to the general election.

31% of registered voters turned out to vote in the election.

== Campaign ==
Menino considered support from Black voters as crucial to securing his re-election. Despite occasionally being at political odds with black elected officials on the Boston City Council and in the state legislature, Menino had enjoyed strong support from black voters in all of his mayoral races. In recognition of this, Menino held his campaign launch event at Hibernian Hall in the Dudley Square area of Roxbury and featured a number of prominent black public political figures at the launch (including State Rep. Linda Dorcena Forry, State Rep. Marie St. Fleur, and Suffolk County Sheriff Andrea Cabral).

After the preliminary election, Flaherty and fellow-Councillor Sam Yoon, who had finished third, declared they had formed a ticket. If Flaherty were victorious, he vowed to appoint Yoon deputy mayor, a position that had not existed in Boston since the administration of Kevin White, who left office in 1984. Kevin McRea also announced that he would endorse Flaherty. Details of the position, including salary, were never finalized.

Following the preliminary election, Flaherty immediately began an aggressive campaign, attacking Menino as ineffectual.

== Candidates ==
=== Candidates who advanced to general election ===
Candidate	Experience	Announced	Ref
The following candidates advanced to the general election held on November 3			
Michael F. Flaherty	Boston city councilor at-large since 2000; Former president of the Boston City Council (2002–2006)	January 25, 2009	
Thomas Menino	Incumbent mayor of Boston since 1993	April 22, 2009	

=== Candidates eliminated in the primary ===
Candidate	Experience	Announced	Ref
The following candidates were eliminated in the primary election and did not advance to the general election			
Kevin McCrea	Businessman; 2005 Boston City Council candidate	January 23, 2009	
Sam Yoon	Boston city councilor at-large since 2006	March 3, 2009	

== Primary election ==
=== Endorsements ===
Michael F. Flaherty

Labor unions

- International Association of Fire Fighters

Newspapers and publications

- The Boston Globe (co-endorsement with Menino)
Thomas Menino

Labor unions

- 1199SEIU United Healthcare Workers East
- International Brotherhood of Electrical Workers Local 103
- Service Employees International Union Local 615
- UNITE HERE Local 26

Organizations

- MassEquality

Newspapers and publications

- The Boston Globe (co-endorsement with Flaherty)
Sam Yoon

State officials

- Mel King, former state representative for the 9th Suffolk District; candidate for mayor in 1983
- Bill Owens, former state senator

Individuals

- Yul Kwon, reality TV show contestant

=== Results ===
2009 Boston Mayoral preliminary election
Primary election
Party	Candidate	Votes	%
Nonpartisan	Thomas Menino	41,086	50.52
Nonpartisan	Michael F. Flaherty	19,480	23.95
Nonpartisan	Sam Yoon	17,207	21.16
Nonpartisan	Kevin McCrea	3,350	4.12
Write-in		199	0.24
Total votes		81,322	100

== General election ==
=== Endorsements ===
Names in bold endorsed after the preliminary election.

Michael F. Flaherty

State officials

- **Mel King**, former state representative for the 9th Suffolk District; candidate for mayor in 1983

Local officials

- **Raymond Flynn**, former mayor of Boston
- **Sam Yoon**, Boston city councillor; former candidate for mayor

Labor unions

- International Association of Fire Fighters

Newspapers and publications

- **Boston Phoenix**
- **The Daily Free Press**
Thomas Menino

Labor unions

- 1199SEIU United Healthcare Workers East
- International Brotherhood of Electrical Workers Local 103
- Service Employees International Union Local 615
- UNITE HERE Local 26

Organizations

- MassEquality

Newspapers and publications

- **The Boston Globe**

=== Results ===
2009 Boston mayoral general election
Party	Candidate	Votes	%
**Nonpartisan**	**Thomas Menino**	**63,123**	**57.27**
Nonpartisan	Michael F. Flaherty	46,768	42.43
Write-in		331	0.40
Total votes		**110,222**	**100**

== See also ==
- List of mayors of Boston, Massachusetts
- 2009 Boston city council election
