= Francis Roache =

American police officer and politician

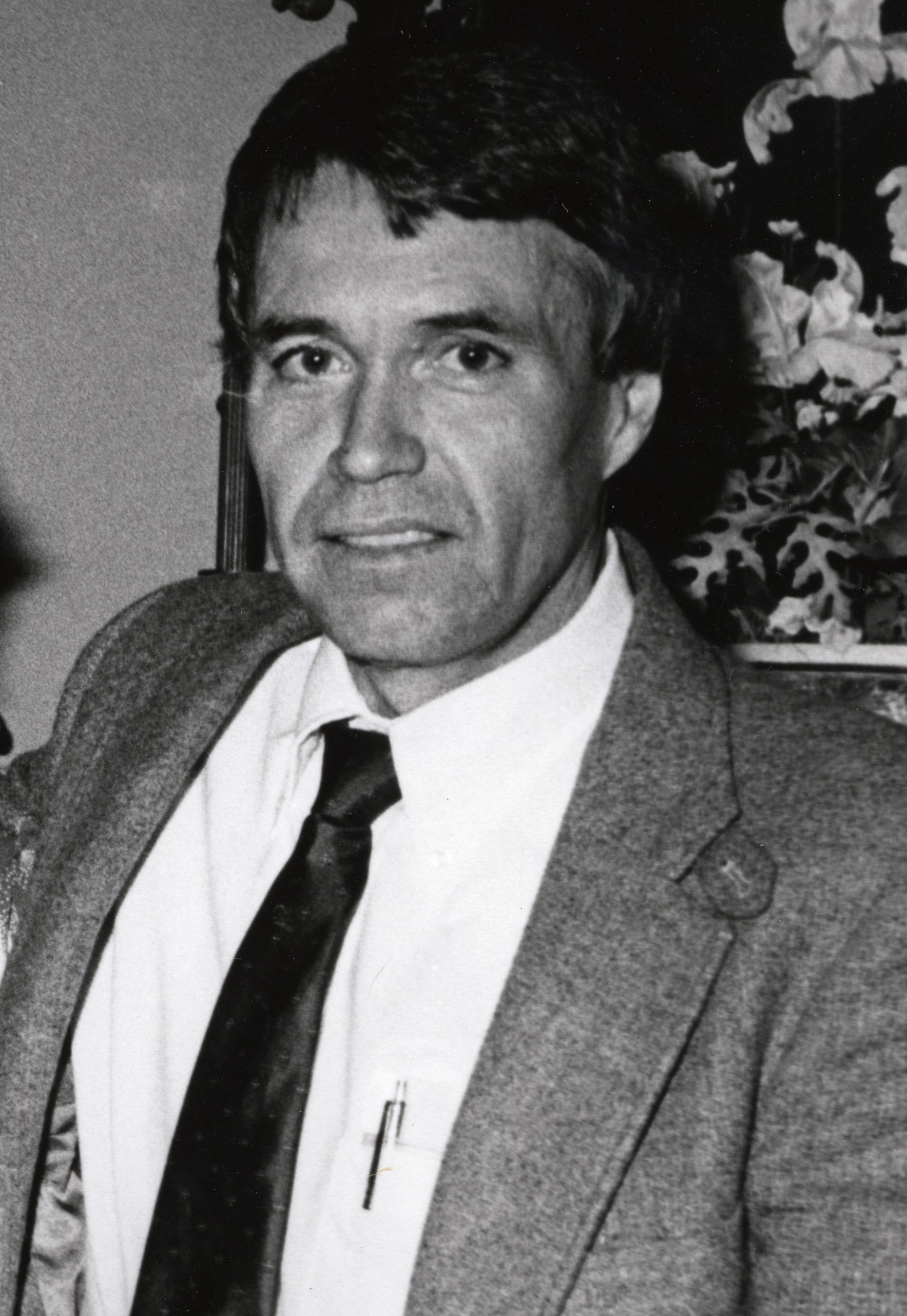
- Roache as Commissioner of Police of Boston

Suffolk County Register of Deeds
- In office 2002 – December 31, 2015
- Preceded by: Paul R. Tierney
- Succeeded by: Stephen J. Murphy

Member of the Boston City Council
- In office 1996–2002
- Preceded by: John A. Nucci
- Succeeded by: Felix D. Arroyo

Boston Police Commissioner
- In office March 13, 1985 – June 30, 1993
- Appointed by: Raymond Flynn
- Preceded by: Joseph M. Jordan
- Succeeded by: William Bratton

Personal details
- Born: August 3, 1936 Boston, Massachusetts, U.S.
- Died: December 17, 2018 (aged 82)
- Spouse: Barbara Campers
- Children: Barbara, Donna, Paula, Michael, and Lori
- Education: Boston State College
- Occupation: Police officer, politician

Military service
- Branch/service: United States Marine Corps

Francis Michael "Mickey" Roache (August 3, 1936 – December 17, 2018) was an American police officer and politician who served as the Boston Police Commissioner from 1985 to 1993. He was also a member of the Boston City Council from 1996 to 2002 and was Suffolk County Register of Deeds from 2002 to 2015.

== Early life, military career, early career and education ==
Roache was born and raised in an Irish-American household in South Boston.

At one time in his younger years, Roache was a Boston city boxing title holder. In his youth, Roache formed a lifelong friendship with (future mayor) Raymond Flynn. The two grew up in houses located blocks from each other, and their fathers were both longshoremen.

Roache graduated from South Boston High School in 1954. He then served four years in the United States Marine Corps until 1959, and worked for Sears Roebuck in The Fenway neighborhood of Boston for 10 years, while attending Boston State College. His thesis for his Master's degree had focused on police relations in Boston.

== Early law enforcement career ==
At the age of 31, Roache decided to become a police officer. He joined the Boston Police Department (BPD) in 1968. In their early police careers, he and William Bratton served as partners.

In 1978, Roache was assigned the head of the BPD's newly-created Community Disorders Unit. The unit had been created in an overdue effort to address incidents of racial violence in the city. Being assigned to this job was widely expected as a dead-end job, with little prospects for advancement. In 1981, while serving this assignment, Roache prominently lobbied in support of the successful passage of a state statute to enable local law enforcement to prosecute civil rights violation. This, plus other aspects of his performance as head of the unit, garnered Roache respect among members of the city's black community. In 1983, Roache was promoted in rank to acting lieutenant.

== Commissioner of the Boston Police Department ==
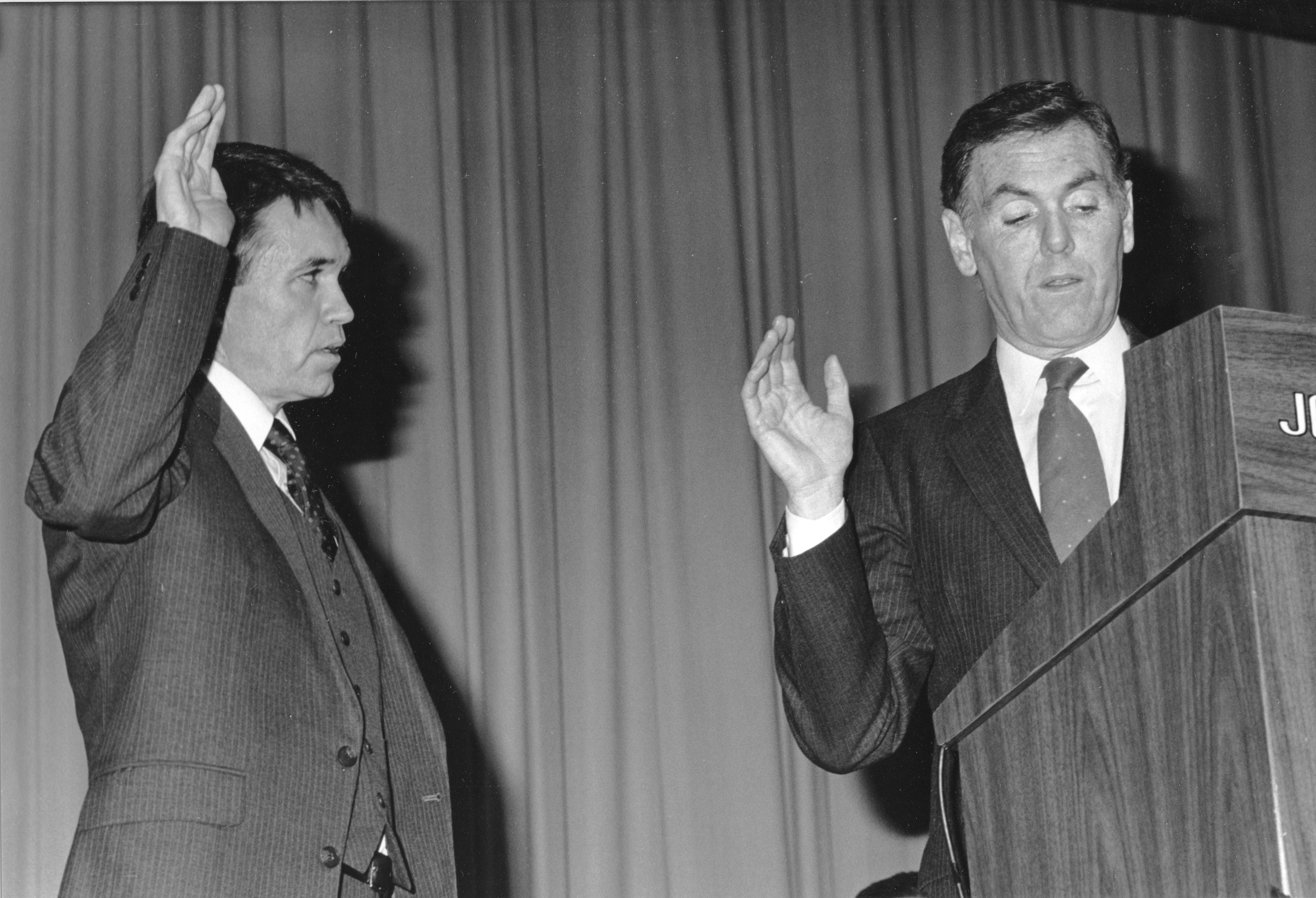
Roache (left) being sworn in as Police Commissioner by Boston Mayor Raymond Flynn in 1985

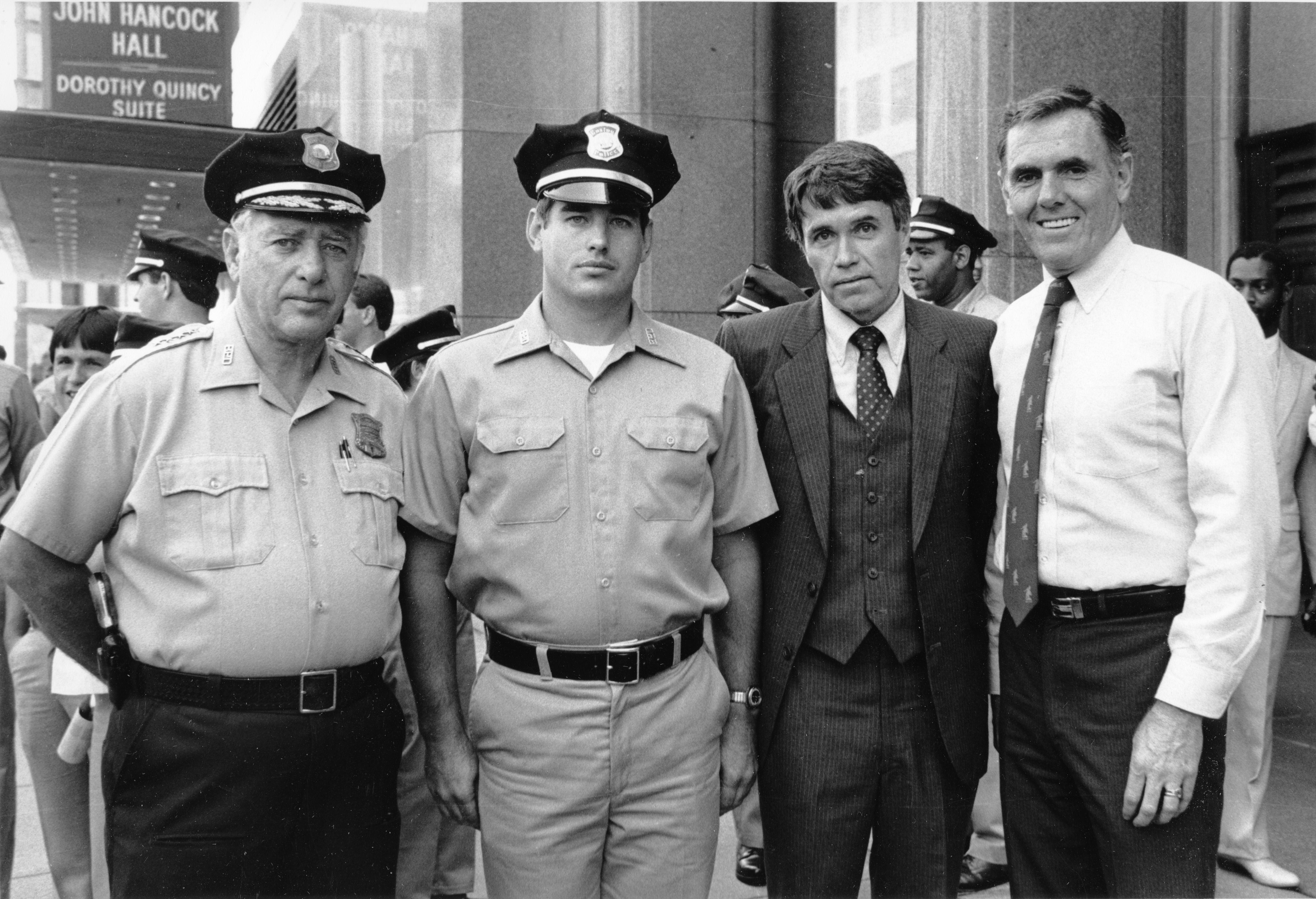
L–R: two policemen, Roache, Raymond Flynn

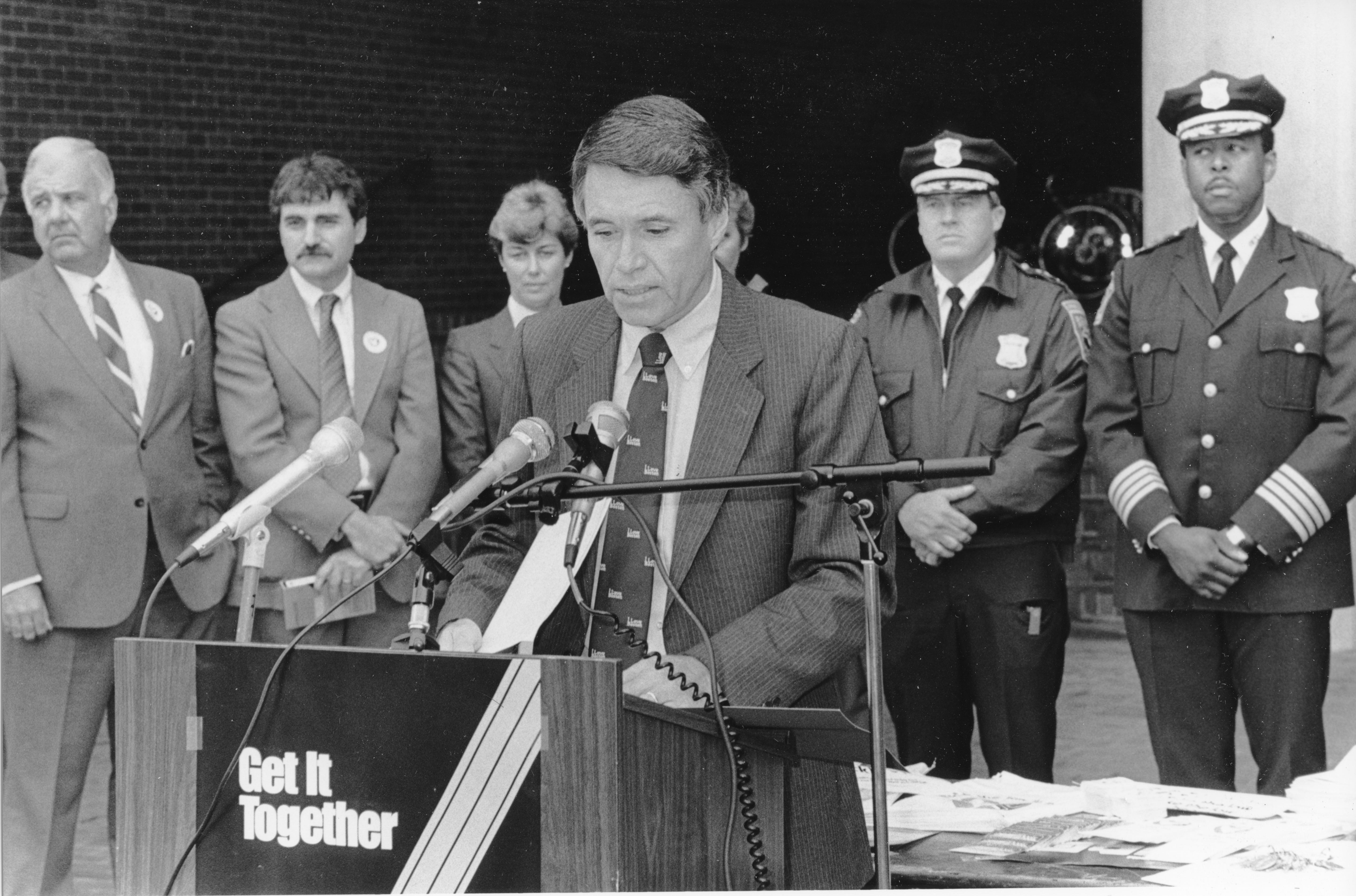
Roache giving a speech, circa 1985-1987

On February 1, 1985, Roache was appointed acting Police Commissioner. He was appointed and was sworn-in on March 13 as permanent Commissioner by his longtime friend Raymond Flynn, who was serving as Mayor of Boston. Soon after taking the position, Roache shook up the department by promoting a number of younger officers to leadership roles. He also promoted a number of black and hispanic officers, and encouraged the department's officers to maintain greater physical fitness. Roache ran the 1985 Boston Marathon. He finished with the fastest time of seventeen BPD force members that ran that year, and also finished approximately an hour quicker than Mayor Flynn (his regular jogging partner at the time).

During his tenure as Commissioner, Roache instituted mandatory drug testing for BPD employees and won praise for his efforts to root out corruption in the department.

Roache was Commissioner during the Charles Stuart case. The police's mishandling of the case caused African-American leaders to call for Roache's resignation. In December 1990, the Massachusetts Attorney General's office released a report which detailed a variety of civil rights violations committed by the BPD. Violations described in the report included random frisking of minority youth and coercing witnesses to testify in the Stuart case.

After several shootings of unarmed victims by police, alleged mismanagement in the Internal Affairs Department, and a report issued by United States Attorney Wayne Budd detailing allegations of police misconduct, Mayor Flynn was pressured to fire Roache. Flynn refused to fire Roache, which caused critics of the police department to claim that Roache's friendship with the Mayor was the reason he was still Commissioner. During the 1991 mayoral election, candidate Edward J. Doherty promised that if elected, he would fire Roache. Flynn appointed a commission led by Boston attorney James D. St. Clair to investigate the BPD. The commission recommended that Flynn fire Roache. On June 24, 1993, Roache announced his resignation, effective June 30.

== Political career ==
After his resignation as Commissioner, Roache became a candidate for mayor of Boston in the 1993 election to succeed Flynn, who had resigned to become United States Ambassador to the Holy See. Roache finished in seventh place in the preliminary election with 3.01% of the vote.

Roache was elected to the Boston City Council in November 1995 as an at-large councilor. He was reelected in 1997, 1999, and 2001. In all four of his council elections, he received the most votes among all the at-large candidates.

In 2002, Roache was elected Suffolk County Registrar of Deeds and resigned the council to assume this office. He was re-elected several times, and remained in the office until resigning on December 31, 2015.

== Personal life ==
Roache and his wife, Barbara (née Campers), raised five children: Barbara, Donna, Paula, Michael, and Lori. They resided in Quincy, Massachusetts, and later the Dorchester neighborhood of Boston. He and his wife had lived as next-door neighbors when growing up. He was a practicing Roman Catholic, often attending mass daily. Roache died on December 17, 2018, at the age of 82.

Roache was known as "Mickey" by those acquainted with him.

Police appointments
Preceded by Joseph M. Jordan	Commissioner of the Boston Police Department; 1985–1993	Succeeded by William J. Bratton
Government offices
Preceded by John A. Nucci	At-large member of the Boston City Council; 1996–2002	Succeeded by Felix D. Arroyo
Preceded by Paul R. Tierney	Suffolk County Register of Deeds; 2002–2015	Succeeded by Stephen J. Murphy
