= 2001 Boston mayoral election =

Election in Massachusetts, United States

- November 6, 2001
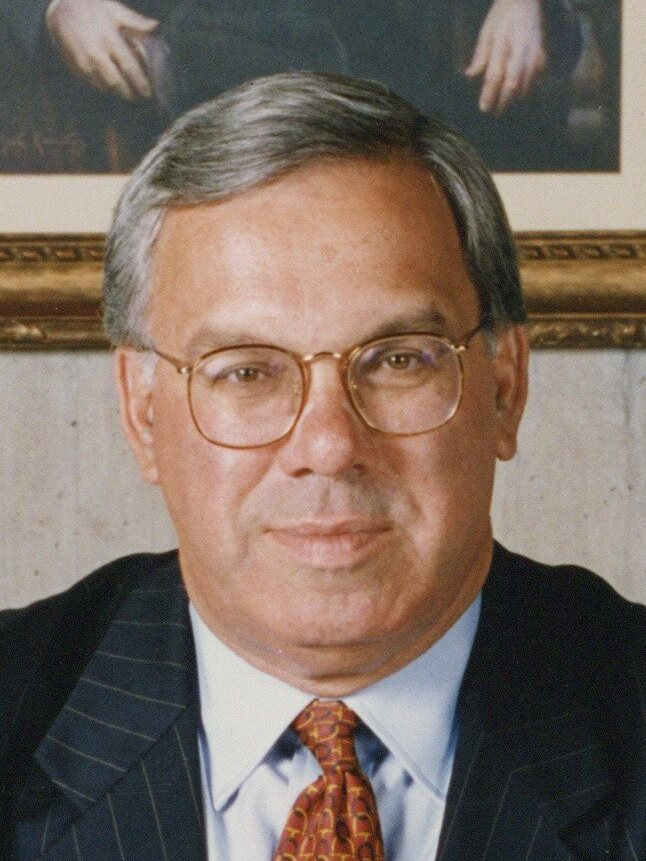

Candidate	Thomas Menino	Peggy Davis-Mullen
Party	Nonpartisan	Nonpartisan
Popular vote	68,011	21,393
Percentage	76.06%	23.93%
- Menino: 50–60% 60–70% 70–80% 80–90% >90%
Mayor before election
Thomas Menino
Elected mayor
Thomas Menino

The Boston mayoral election of 2001 occurred on Tuesday, November 6, 2001, between incumbent mayor Thomas Menino and City Councilor Peggy Davis-Mullen. Menino was re-elected to a third term.

The nonpartisan municipal preliminary election was held on September 25, 2001. Davis-Mullen, by finishing second, became the second woman to be a finalist for mayor in city history.

== Background ==
Overwhelmingly popular across the city, Menino was widely favored to win re-election.

== Candidates ==
- Thomas Menino, Mayor of Boston since 1993, Boston City Councilor from 1984 to 1993, and Council President in 1993.
- Peggy Davis-Mullen, Boston City Councilor since 1994.

=== Candidates eliminated in preliminary ===
- Althea Garrison, member of the Massachusetts House of Representatives from the 5th Suffolk District from 1993 to 1995.

== Results ==
Candidates	Preliminary Election		General Election	
Candidates	Votes	%	Votes	%
Thomas Menino (incumbent)	31,715	73.37	68,011	76.06
Peggy Davis-Mullen	9,958	23.04	21,393	23.93
Althea Garrison	1,552	3.59		

== See also ==
- List of mayors of Boston, Massachusetts
