= Peggy Davis-Mullen =

American politician

At-large member of the Boston City Council
- In office 1994–2001
- Preceded by: Bruce Bolling/ Rosaria Salerno
- Succeeded by: Maura Hennigan

Peggy Davis-Mullen (born 1960) is a former member of the Boston City Council in Boston, Massachusetts, having served from 1994 to 2001.

She ran for Mayor of Boston in the 2001 mayoral election against incumbent Thomas Menino; she lost, but is recognized as the second female finalist for mayor in city history. (Note: Louise Day Hicks was the first female mayoral finalist in 1967 and 1971)

== Boston City Council (1994–2001) ==
From 1994 through 2001, Mullen served as a member of the Boston City Council.

In 1991, Davis-Mullen unsuccessfully ran for an at-large seat on council. She successfully ran in 1993. She was re-elected in 1995, 1997, and 1999.

== 2001 mayoral campaign ==
Davis-Mullen was the second female mayoral finalist in Boston's history.
