= Maura Hennigan =

American politician

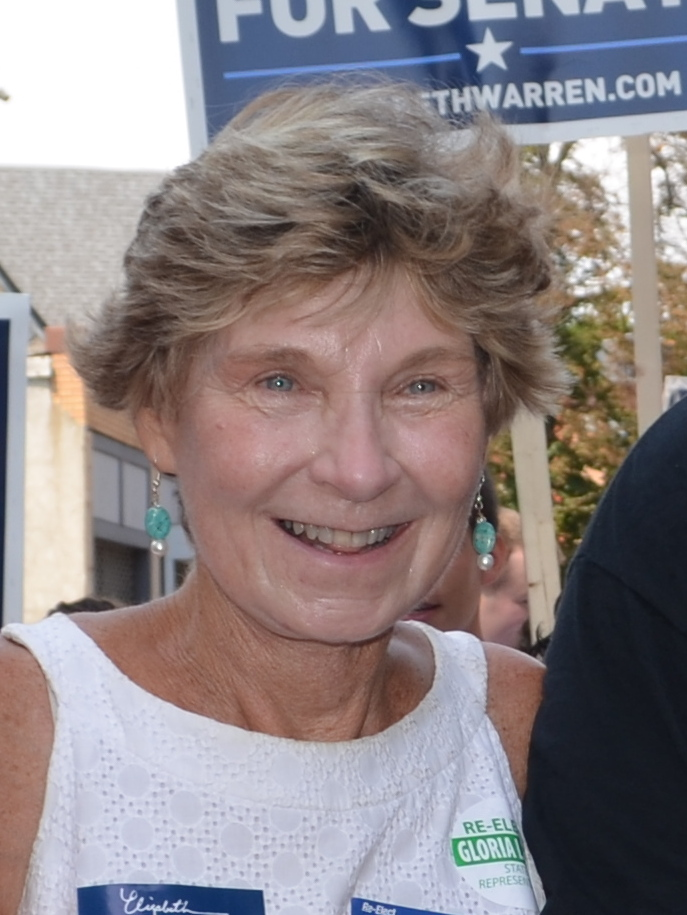
- Hennigan in 2012

Clerk of the Suffolk County Criminal Courts
- Incumbent
- Assumed office January 2007
- Preceded by: John A. Nucci

Member of the Boston City Council
- In office January 2002 – January 2006
- Preceded by: Peggy Davis-Mullen
- Succeeded by: Sam Yoon
- Constituency: At-large
- In office January 1984 – January 2002
- Preceded by: district created
- Succeeded by: John M. Tobin Jr.
- Constituency: District 6
- In office January 1982 – January 1984
- Preceded by: Various outgoing councilors: Lawrence DiCara; Patrick F. McDonough; Rosemarie Sansone; John W. Sears
- Succeeded by: number of at-large seats reduced
- Constituency: At-large

Personal details
- Born: 1952 (age 73–74)
- Parent: James W. Hennigan Jr. (father)
- Relatives: James W. Hennigan Sr. (grandfather)
- Education: B.S. UMass Amherst

Maura A. Hennigan (born 1952) is an American politician who currently serves as the Clerk Magistrate of Suffolk County, Massachusetts, Superior Court Criminal/Business Division. She is a former member of the Boston City Council and was a mayoral candidate in 2005. From 1987 to 1993, she was known as Maura Hennigan Casey.

== Early life ==
Hennigan graduated from Mount Saint Joseph Academy, an all-girls, Catholic college preparatory school in Boston. She attended Salve Regina College, but did not graduate. She later earned a Bachelor of Science degree from the University of Massachusetts Amherst.

After college she became a registered dietician, interning at Boston Lying-In Hospital. She was a teacher in the Boston Public School system for seven years until she lost her job as a result of cuts following the implementation of Proposition 2½.

== Political career ==
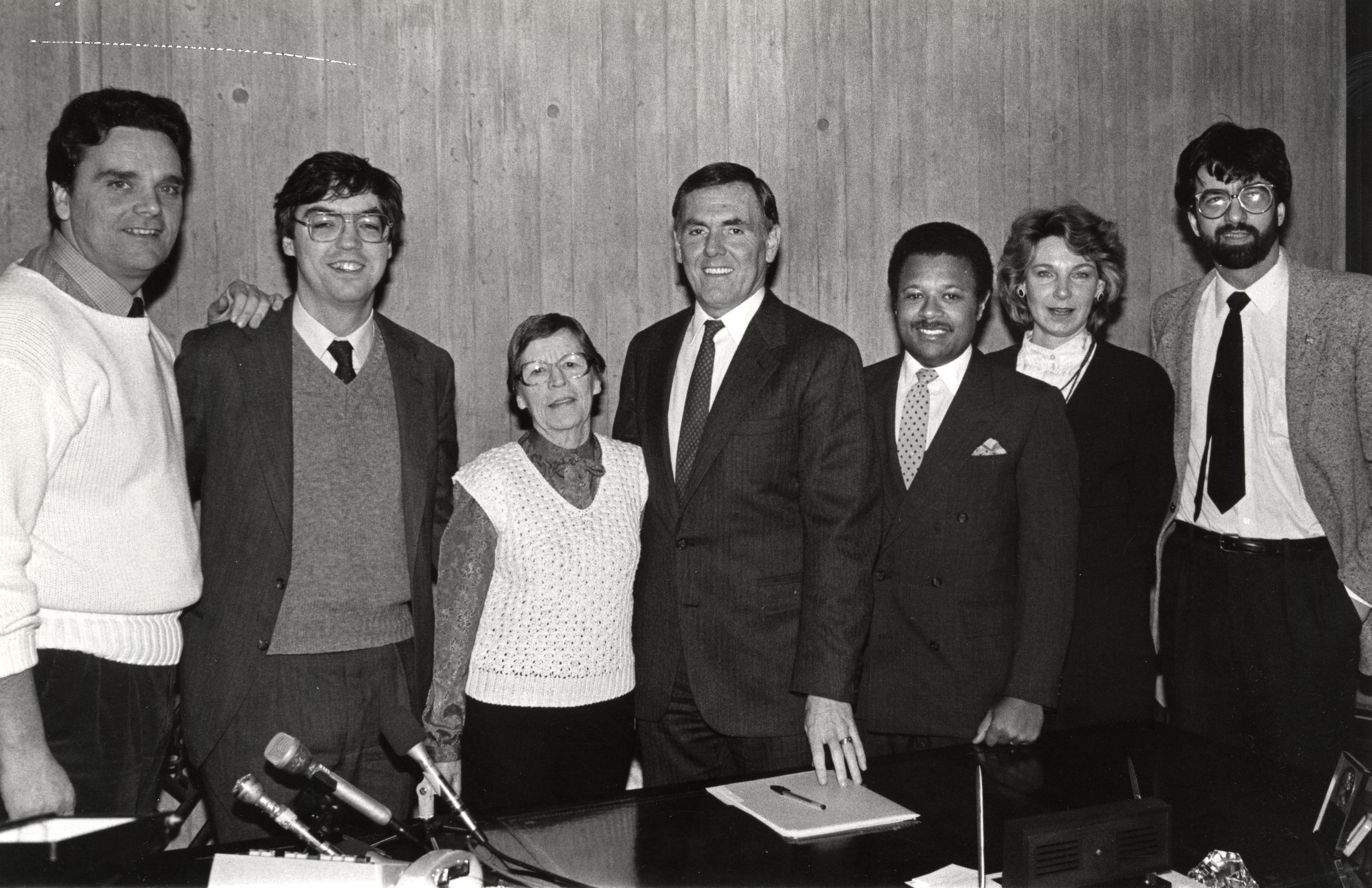
Hennigan (second from right) with Mayor Raymond Flynn (center) and several Boston City Council members (ca.1984–1987)

From 1982 through 2005, Hennigan was a member of the Boston City Council. She was first elected in November 1981, the final election when all seats were at-large. She was subsequently re-elected to nine two-year terms as the representative for District 6 (Jamaica Plain and West Roxbury). In November 2001, she successfully ran for an at-large position, and was re-elected in November 2003. She was the first woman to chair Boston's Ways and Means Committee.

In 1986, Hennigan was a candidate for Massachusetts Auditor. She finished second in a three way Democratic primary, losing A. Joseph DeNucci but placing ahead of Charles Yancey. In 1997, she lost the party primary for the Democratic Party nomination in the special election for the Massachusetts Senate seat in the Suffolk and Norfolk District -placing third behind Brian A. Joyce and Maureen Feeney. In both 1984 and 1996, she was elected to the Massachusetts Democratic Party State Committee. She unsuccessfully ran for Mayor of Boston in November 2005, being defeated by incumbent Thomas Menino (who garnered 67% of the vote).

In 2006, Hennigan was elected clerk of the Criminal/Business Court of Suffolk County, defeating assistant clerk of court Robert Dello-Russo. She became the ninth elected official to hold this position, as well as the first female official. She was reelected in 2012, 2018, and 2024.

== Personal life ==
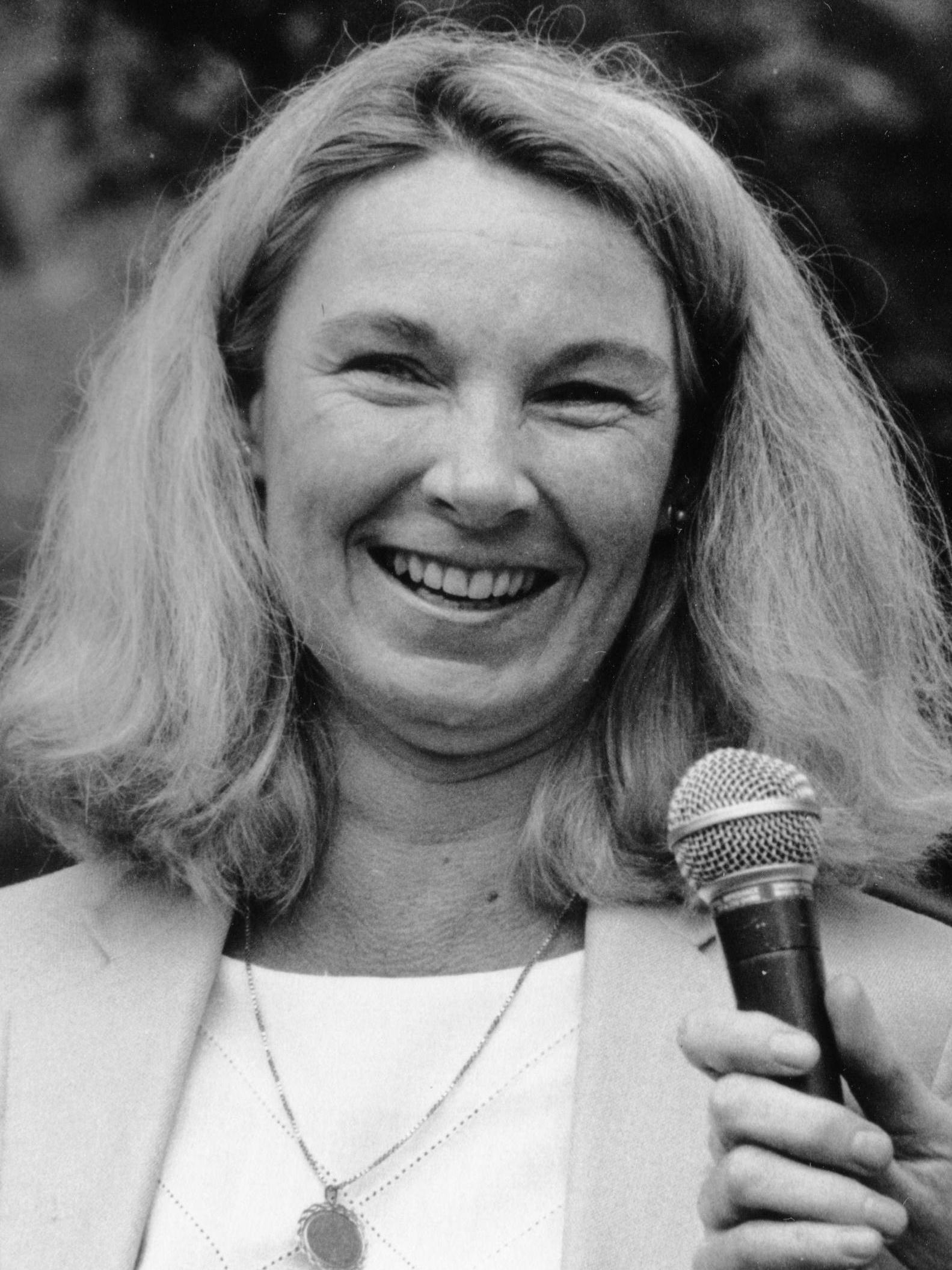
Hennigan in the 1980s

As of 2007, Hennigan hosted a weekly television show on Boston Neighborhood Network. She is the daughter of former register of probate, state senator, state representative, and Boston School Committee member James W. Hennigan Jr. She has a brother, James W. Hennigan III and a sister Helen. Her grandfather James W. Hennigan Sr. was a state senator and the namesake of the James W. Hennigan School in Jamaica Plain. She is the grandniece of William O. S. Hennigan, a member of the Boston Common Council in 1900.
