= Brian Honan =

American politician (1963–2002)

Brian Honan (April 2, 1963 – July 30, 2002) was a Democratic Party member of the Boston City Council. He was elected from the 9th district, representing the neighborhoods of Allston and Brighton.

== Personal life ==
He graduated from St. Columbkille High School, Boston College and the New England School of Law.

Honan died four days after surgery at Brigham and Women's Hospital in Boston. The surgery was to remove a cancerous tumor in his bile duct. At the time of his death, he was running to become the District Attorney in Suffolk County, Massachusetts. His brother, State Representative Kevin Honan, delivered the eulogy.

== Legacy ==
The Brian J. Honan Charitable Fund sponsors an annual 5K road race. The Allston branch of the Boston Public Library is named after him.

The Allston Brighton Community Development Corporation sponsored Brian J. Honan Apartments are also named after him.
