= Maureen Feeney =

American politician

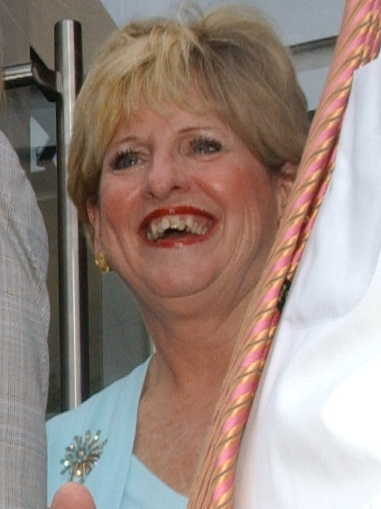
- Feeney in 2005

Boston City Clerk
- In office January 2012 – February 1, 2022
- Preceded by: Rosaria Salerno
- Succeeded by: Alex Geourntas

President of the Boston City Council
- In office January 2007 – January 2009
- Preceded by: Michael F. Flaherty
- Succeeded by: Michael P. Ross

Member of the Boston City Council from the 3rd district
- In office January 1994 – November 10, 2011
- Preceded by: James E. Byrne
- Succeeded by: Frank Baker

Personal details
- Party: Democratic

Maureen E. Feeney is an American politician who served on the Boston City Council and was the City Clerk of Boston, Massachusetts.

== Early life ==
Feeney grew up in Boston. Her parents were politically involved, and were strong supporters of James Michael Curley. Her maternal grandfather, Robert Kelly, had been a personal friend of Curley and regular political volunteer for Curley's campaigns. Feeney would later recount that, when she was ten, her parents brought her to view Curley's open casket during his wake in the rotunda of the Massachusetts State House.

== Early career ==
Feeney worked in the insurance industry. However, she departed this work in the private sector industry in April 1987 to take a public sector job as an aide to an aide to 3rd district city councilor James E. Byrne. This was her first public-sector job. Her work for Byrne included serving as his neighborhood liaison. Before being invited by Byrne to join his staff, Feeney had been the campaign treasurer of his election opponent, John Garland.

== Boston city councilor (1993–2011) ==
When Byrne decided to retire from the council ahead of the 1993 election, he urged Feeney to run for his seat successor. Feeney was successful in winning election, receiving 55% of the vote against John O'Toole in the (nonpartisan) general election. Feeney was re-elected to city council nine times, winning sizable victories each time. She spent just shy of 18 years on the city council, representing the district centered in Dorchester neighborhood.

Feeney authored the legislation that enabled the 1995 merger of Boston City Hospital and Boston University Hospital (with the two becoming the Boston Medical Center, avoiding the privatization of a public medical institution). In 2022, she recalled this as having been the accomplishment she was proudest of from her time on the city council.

While on the council, Feeney twice sought election to the state legislature. In 1996, Feeney was a candidate for state representative in the 13th Suffolk District, but ultimately withdrew from the race. In 1997, she lost the party primary for the Democratic Party nomination in the special election for the Massachusetts Senate seat in the Suffolk and Norfolk District -losing to Brian A. Joyce by less than 400 votes. In 1998 she again ran for the seat, losing to Joyce in the Democratic primary by a much larger margin.

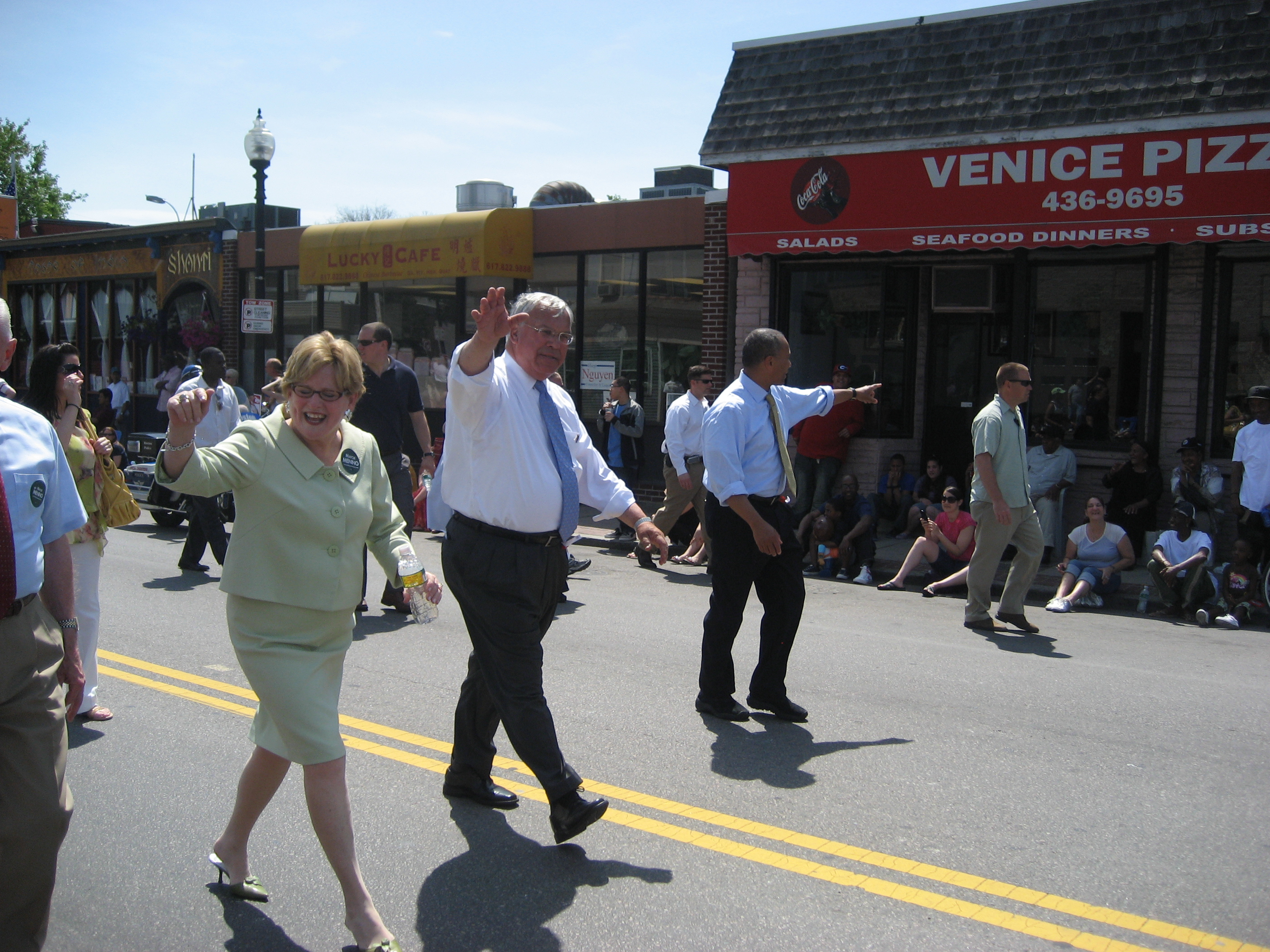
Feeney marches in the 2009 Doechester Day Parade alongside Mayor Thomas Menino and Governor Deval Patrick

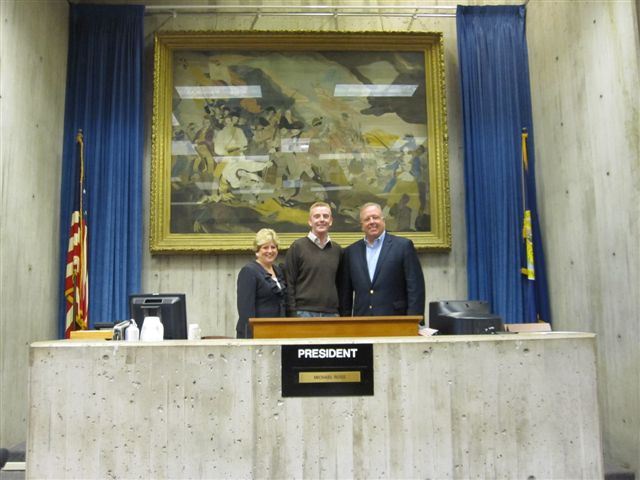
2010 photograph of Feeney in the council chamber with Irish politician Derek Nolan (center) and fellow councilor Stephen J. Murphy (right)

Feeney held stints as chair and vice president of several council committees, including City & Neighborhood Services; Government Operations; Housing; and Health and Human Services. She was a close ally of Mayor Thomas Menino. With Menino coming to view council president Michael F. Flaherty's rising stature as a political threat to himself, he successfully maneuvered to get Feeney elected in January 2007 by the council as its president instead of Flaherty. The Boston Globe wrote that her election as council president represented the, "rise to power of the council's minority and those representing the city's most diverse neighborhoods." She was the second woman to serve as council president (after Louise Day Hicks, who was council president in 1976). In 2008, Feeney was elected by councilors to serve a second year as council president, becoming the first woman to serve more than one year as council president. As a prominent member of the council herself, Feeney became seen as a potential contender to one day be elected as Menino's mayoral successor.

In April 2011, Feeney announced that she would not seek further re-election to the council. A wide field of candidates ran in the election that year to succeed her, with Frank Baker prevailing. She resigned on November 10, 2011, before her elected term was complete. Her early resignation was to facilitate her potential appointment to the city clerkship. Her resignation from the council (which occurred two months before the expiration of her elected term) made her eligible for appointment before the end of the incumbent city council, as state conflict of interest law required that her to be out of office for a minimum of 30 days before she could be appointed.

== Boston city clerk (2012–2022) ==
On December 21, 2011, Feeney was named appointed city clerk by a 10–1 vote of the city council. Charles Yancey cast the sole vote against Feeney, instead voting for Natalie Carithers. Councilor Tito Jackson voted present (abstention) to indicate his displeasure with the process behind her appointment as the new clerk. Feeney took office the following month.

Feeney's daughter, Kaitlin Passafaro served as Boston's director of the Mayor's Office of Intergovernmental Relations in a tenure largely coinciding with Feeney's own tenure as clerk, resulting in the two working as colleagues.

Feeney retired on February 1, 2022, at the end of her third term as clerk.

== Other work ==
Feeney has served on the boards of several organizations, including Boston Medical Center, Bay Cove Human Services, Boston Home, as well as the Dorchester Boys & Girls Club.

In 2002, Feeney joined the Massachusetts Democratic State Committee. She was re-elected to four times to full terms in this position.

== Recognition ==
Friends for Children named Feeney their "Woman of the Year" in 2000.

Preceded by Michael F. Flaherty	President of the Boston City Council; 2007 and 2008	Succeeded by Michael P. Ross
