= Mukiya Baker-Gomez =

Boston political strategist

- Born: September 22, 1948; Boston, Massachusetts, U.S.
- Died: June 10, 2023 (aged 74); Boston, Massachusetts, U.S.
- Occupations: Community organizer; Political strategist
- Known for: Activism in Boston politics, campaign management
- Spouse: Kevin Gomez
- Children: 2

Mukiya Baker-Gomez (September 22, 1948 – June 10, 2023) was an American political strategist and community leader in the Hyde Park and Mattapan neighborhoods in Boston. She is known for a career spanning over five decades, acting as a key organizer and strategist in numerous political campaigns and an advocate for affordable housing, education reform, and economic justice for the city's Black community. U.S. Representative Ayanna Pressley described her as having created the "literal electoral blueprint to winning elections in Boston and building coalitions." She died on June 10, 2023.

== Early life ==
She was born at Boston City Hospital in 1948 and grew up in the Roxbury neighborhood of Boston. Baker-Gomez went to Jamaica Plain High School and attended Lesley University.

== Political career ==
Baker-Gomez led political campaigns of Black politicians and activists in Boston. She led Gloria Fox's 1993 campaign for Massachusetts state representative, and both Ayanna Pressley's 2009 campaign and Chuck Turner's 1999 campaign for Boston city council.

Baker-Gomez also organized Mel King's 1993 mayoral campaign in Boston and former Massachusetts Senator Dianne Wilkerson's 1993 win over incumbent Bill Owens, resulting in the election of the first Black woman in a Massachusetts Senate seat. Baker-Gomez was also chief of staff for state Representative Gloria Fox. She ran field operations in Roxbury for Andrea Cabral's campaign for Suffolk County sheriff in 2004. She also managed Charles Yancey's successful 2003 campaign for reelection as city councilor.

As a community organizer, Baker-Gomez worked for the Black United Front in the 1970s. She was co-director of the October 2005 Millions More Movement March in Boston, which was spearheaded by Louis Farrakhan. She also worked with the Contractors Association of Boston, the Opportunities Industrialization Center, Massachusetts' Department of Youth Services and led the State Office of Minority and Women Business Assistance (SOMWBA). Under the tenure of former Governor Deval Patrick, her work at SOMWBA helped compliance to Nixon's executive order for a national program for minority businesses. Baker-Gomez was also a part of the Black Boston COVID-19 Coalition which partnered with CIC Health to administer vaccinations during the pandemic.

She was an emeritus board member of the Black Economic Council of Massachusetts alongside Lee Pelton.

== Legacy ==
Baker-Gomez was eulogized by Representative Ayanna Pressley on the House floor in November 2023. In March 2025, A park bench in Horatio Harris Park in the Roxbury neighborhood was named after her as one of Boston's Civic Heroes. In 2023, she was recognized as one of "Boston’s most admired, beloved, and successful Black Women leaders" by the Black Women Lead project.
