= Boston City Council tenure of Michelle Wu =

2014–2021 tenure in Massachusetts, US

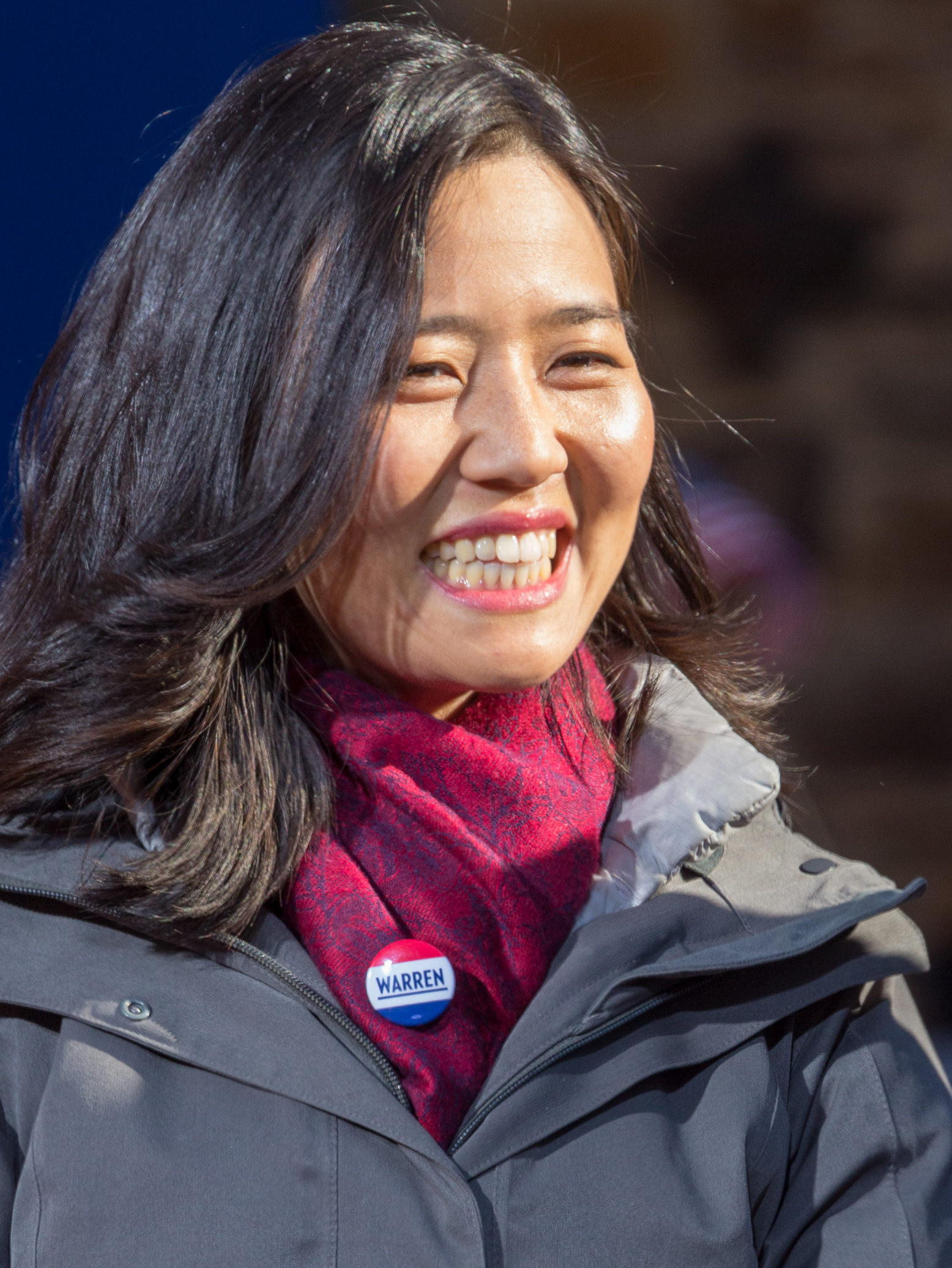
- Wu in 2019

President of the Boston City Council
- In office January 2016 – January 2018
- Preceded by: Bill Linehan
- Succeeded by: Andrea Campbell

Member of the Boston City Council from the at-large district
- In office January 4, 2014 – November 16, 2021
- Preceded by: John R. Connolly; Felix G. Arroyo
- Succeeded by: Erin Murphy

Michelle Wu, a Democrat, served as a member of the Boston City Council from January 2014 until becoming mayor of Boston in November 2021. Wu was first elected to the City Council in November 2013, and was re-elected three times (in 2015, 2017, and 2019). In 2016 and 2017, Wu served as the council's president.

Wu received positive recognition for her work as a city councilor. Wu served on the Council at a time when the body acted to wield greater influence than earlier iterations had in preceding decades. The council acted particularly bolder during her own tenure as its president. Wu was considered to be a progressive member. As a councilor, Wu authored several ordinances that were enacted as law. This included an ordinance to prevent the city from contracting with health insurers that discriminate in their coverage against transgender individuals. She also authored enacted ordinances to have the city protect wetlands, support adaption to climate change, enact a plastic bag ban, adopt Community Choice Aggregation, and provide paid parental leave to municipal employees. As a city councilor, Wu also partook in a successful effort to adopt regulations on short-term rentals.

== Elections ==
Wu was first elected to the Boston City Council in 2013, and was subsequently thrice reelected. In 2021, Wu decided not to seek a fifth term on the City Council and to run for mayor instead.

=== 2013 ===
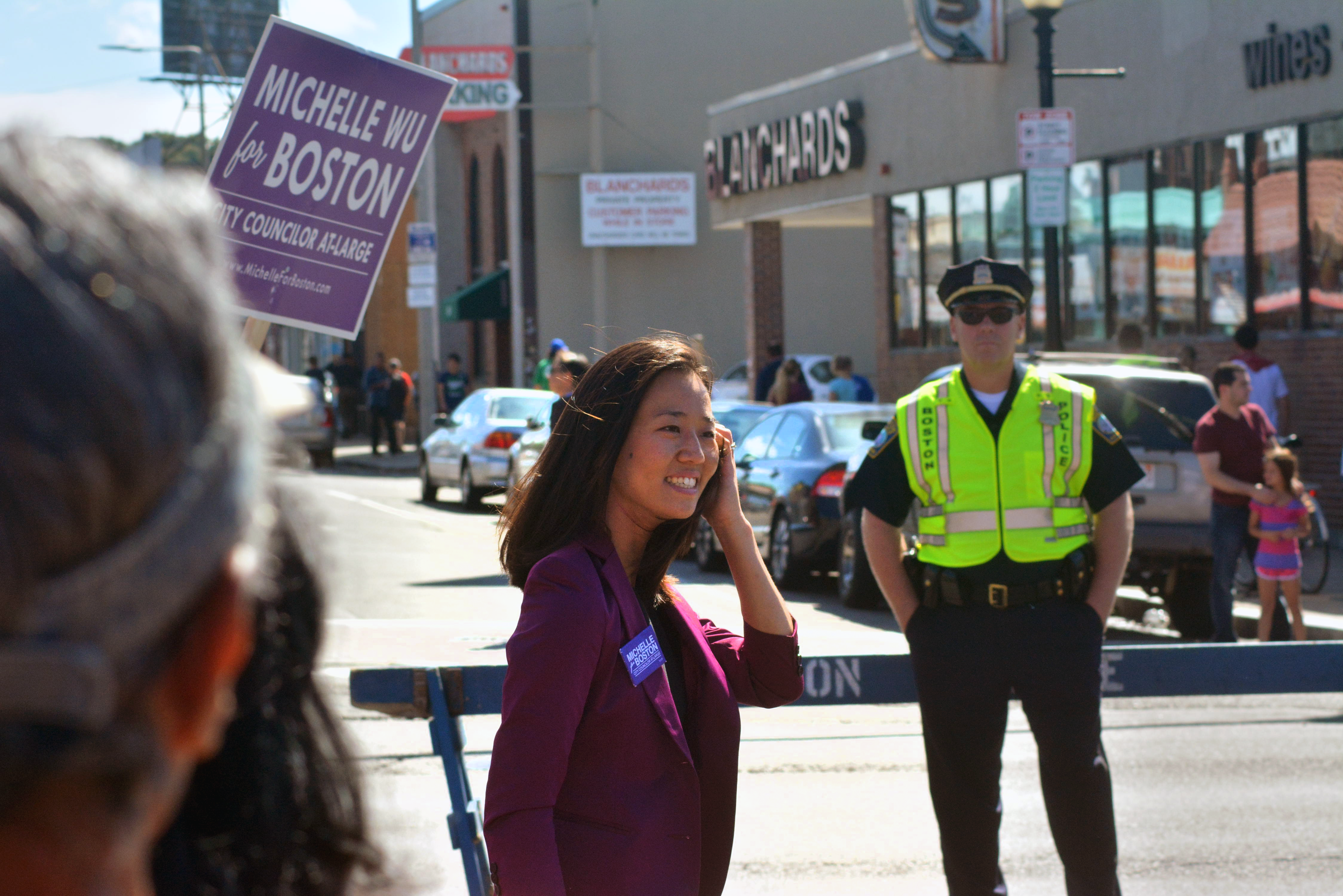
Wu campaigning for Boston City Council in 2013

Wu was first elected to an at-large seat on the Boston City Council in November 2013. She finished in second place to incumbent Ayanna Pressley in an election where the top four finishers were elected to at-large seats.

Adrian Walker of The Boston Globe observed early into Wu's campaign that her candidacy that her entry into the City Council election was generating excitement in a municipal election cycle that had yet to foster much other excitement despite a rare open-seat race for mayor.

In August 2013, an article by Emily Cahn of Roll Call noted Wu had already made a strong impression on political observers in Boston, and that Wu was being speculated as a potential future candidate for the United States House of Representatives. The article quoted an unnamed Democratic political consultant as remarking, "She is one to watch. She’s running for the Boston City Council for the first time, but everybody is so impressed with her."

Wu received the endorsement of The Boston Globe's editorial board. In endorsing Wu's candidacy, the editorial board wrote,

First-time candidate Michelle Wu...combines an intellectual approach to government with the practical experience of someone who has run her own business and served as her family’s guardian following her mother’s illness.

The Boston Globe editorial board further praised Wu's work on reforming restaurant permitting and licensing during her time in the mayoral administration of Thomas Menino. The editorial board observed that Wu's candidacy had received support from some prominent political players in part due to Wu's work as a staffer for Elizabeth Warren's successful 2012 Senate election campaign. In a 2021 article, Ellen Barry of The New York Times observed that Wu's temperament and personality as a candidate contrasted with that conventionally associated with Boston politicians, as did the fact that she was not a Boston native,

In a city of backslapping, larger-than-life politicians, [Wu] was a soft-spoken, Harvard-educated policy nerd...in a city of deep neighborhood loyalties, she was a newcomer.

Barry further observed that Wu's candidacy came as the city "was turning a corner" with an "increasingly young, well-educated, and left-leaning" electorate. Shortly before the day of the general election, Wu experienced laryngitis. Supporters of her campaign worried that her inability to deliver speeches in the closing stretch of the election might impair her performance in the election. However, she nevertheless prevailed in the election result. Barry observed,

Ms. Wu, then 28, had put the pieces in place, learning Boston’s political ecosystem, engaging voters about policy, cobbling together a multiracial coalition. This was not about speeches. She would win in a different way.

=== 2015 ===
Wu was re-elected in November 2015, again coming in second behind to Pressley. Wu was again endorsed by the editorial board of The Boston Globe.

=== 2017 ===
Wu was re-elected to a third term on the council in November 2017, garnering the most votes among all at-large candidates; her tally of over 65,000 votes was the most since Michael J. McCormack in November 1983. Wu was again endorsed by the editorial board of The Boston Globe.

=== 2019 ===
Wu re-elected to a fourth term in November 2019, again placing first. In her 2019 campaign, Wu shared a campaign office with Kim Janey, who was seeking reelection as a district city councilor, and fellow at-large city council candidate Alejandra St. Guillen. Sharing campaign resources with a fellow at-large candidate was regarded as an unusual move that reflected confidence by Wu in her own odds of securing reelection. Wu was endorsed by Attorney General Maura Healey and the editorial board of The Boston Globe.

== Council politics ==
Wu was the first Asian American woman to serve on the council, and only the second Asian American member to serve on the council. In late 2014, Wu became the first city councilor in Boston history to give birth while serving on the Boston City Council. From January 2016 to January 2018, she served as president of the council, the first woman of color and first Asian American to hold the role. Wu's council presidency made her only the third female president in the then-106 year history of the Boston City Council. In 2024, Wu recalled the atmosphere on council at the start of her tenure as being, "so gendered and racialized and pitted." When she joined the council, she and Ayanna Pressley were the only two women of color serving on the council. However, at the end of her tenure six of the council's thirteen members were women of color.

During her tenure on the Boston City Council, Wu chaired the Post Audit; Planning, Development and Transportation; and Oversight committees.

While Boston's strong mayor form of government had conventionally limited the impact that members of the council had on the city government, Wu's tenure on the City Council occurred during a period in which the council began to increasingly wield its power, with the body yielding less to the mayor than previous iterations of the council had in the preceding decades and making use of its subpoena powers for the first time in decades. Wu was regarded as a progressive on the Boston City Council, and the council began pushing its politics in a similar direction during this time. In December 2019, Milton J. Valencia of The Boston Globe opined that, beginning under Wu's tenure as council president and continuing into Andrea Campbell's tenure as her successor, the Boston City Council, "has been, perhaps, the most aggressive in recent history in pushing reforms, often to the left of the mayor, on issues addressing climate change and economic and racial equity."

In April 2019, Rachael Allen of The Atlantic wrote that Wu, "embodies the kind of political change that’s making waves in Washington, D.C., and cities across the country." Allen described Wu as presenting a unique leadership style when compared to other rising politicians that challenged the status quo, writing,

Wu stands out from many of her political peers because of her particular leadership style. Unlike [Ayanna] Pressley, Wu isn’t known for being an impassioned speaker. Unlike [Alexandria] Ocasio-Cortez, Wu would never be described as a "bomb-thrower and agitator."...But Wu has emerged as one of the city’s most effective and diplomatic politicians. She has negotiated with the mayor on issues such as government transparency, short-term-housing-rental regulations, and green energy, earning a reputation for both hyper-detailed policy work and humility in the face of a prideful city.

A member of the council's liberal/progressive wing, Wu often cast votes that aligned with other progressives on the council. Other members of the informal liberal/progressive grouping on the council included Ayanna Pressley and Lydia Edwards.

Wu would occasionally voice her policy disagreements with Mayor Walsh, either on social media or when speaking to the press. Mayor Walsh grew frustrated by this, and criticized her for not keeping her disagreements with him more private.

=== Support for Bill Linehan's 2014 council president candidacy ===
In the weeks prior to taking office for her first term, Wu announced that she would vote for Bill Linehan to serve as the president of the Boston City Council. Many of Wu's progressive backers were surprised, since Linehan was seen as the council's most conservative member. At the time, she faced backlash from many progressives for this. Many of the city's liberal voters were strongly opposed to the idea of Linehan becoming council president, and a number of liberal activists threatened that Wu would lose re-election in 2015 if she did not change her mind. The Boston Globe's editorial board later characterized the matter as causing a "controversial start" to Wu's tenure, having "enraged some of the liberal voters who supported her."

In addition to Linehan, councilors Matt O'Malley and Tito Jackson had also been seeking to become the next council president. Both O'Malley and Jackson were considered to be members of the council's liberal wing (which had five returning members, including the two of them). There was an open agreement between O'Malley and Jackson that if one of them faltered in their efforts to secure support, they would bow out in favor of the other thus ensuring that one of them or the other could receive the votes of all five returning liberal members. Meanwhile, Linehan was regarded as all-but-sure to win the backing from the six returning council members (including himself) who were not part of the council's liberal wing. This meant that the council presidency election had only two likely swing-votes: Wu and the only other newly elected member: Timothy McCarthy. O'Malley had appeared close to prevailing for a period, securing pledges of support from all returning liberal members as well as from McCarthy. This however, left him one shy of a majority. Despite being aligned with the council's liberal wing, Wu had not followed the rest of that wing in pledging her support to his candidacy. O'Malley lost ground after McCarthy withdrew his backing from him and instead gave his support to Linehan, giving Linehan majority support. Soon after this, Linehan bolstered his majority support by also garnering Wu's backing.

Wu justified her backing of Linehan's bid for the council presidency by citing her belief that Linehan would be the most effective at running the City Council, and by citing her support for Linehan's promises to decentralize power away from the City Council president's office, empower the council's committee chairs, and reorganize the central staff of the City Council. The editorial board of The Boston Globe wrote that Wu's support for Linehan's bid for the council presidency was "a head-scratcher, at the very least," and called the rationale that Wu gave for her vote as, "honest enough but politically naïve." Andrew Ryan of The Boston Globe later observed, "Wu played a crucial role [in Linehan's election as council president], casting her vote for him despite pressure from liberal supporters."

After O'Malley had failed to cobble together the support of a majority and Linehan had, Jackson attempted again in earnest to secure himself backing, but failed to peel away supporters from Linehan. Pressley followed, with Linehan defeating her last-minute candidacy. The Council ultimately elected Linehan as its president by a 8–5 vote, with Linehan defeating a last-hour challenge from Ayanna Pressley.

=== 2016 election as council president ===
After her 2015 reelection to a second term, Wu sought support from other councilors for her election as council president in the 2016–17 council term. Her bid for the council presidency was supported by outgoing council president Linehan, and on November 13, Wu had publicly announced that she had received pledges of support from a majority of council members. At this point, Wu's support came roughly from the same grouping of members that had elected Linehan to the council presidency, and despite her own progressive leanings included key support from members of the council's conservative bloc. Many of council's liberal members had initially supported Matt O'Malley instead of Wu. Mark Ciommo also sought to secure support for himself, but withdrew. On the eve of the vote, O'Malley too withdrew, voicing his support for Wu. On January 4, 2016, Wu was unanimously elected council president. Council rules prevent the presidency from being held by the same member for multiple terms consecutively, and Andrea Campbell was elected in January 2018 to succeed Wu.

=== Support for Kim Janey's 2020 council president candidacy ===
Ahead of the start of Wu's fourth term on the city council, she supported Kim Janey's candidacy to be the next president of the City Council. In the weeks before the 2020–22 Boston City Council term, the elected members were initially sharply divided in their support between Janey and Matt O'Malley. Wu's support played an important role in helping Janey secure the support to become City Council president. On January 6, 2020, Wu nominated Janey to be the council's president. Janey was elected with every member voting "yes" except for Frank Baker, who voted "present".

== Economic matters ==
In April 2015, the Boston City Council passed a paid parental leave ordinance that was authored by Wu. The ordinance provided city employees with six weeks of paid parental leave after childbirth, stillbirth, or adoption. Roughly a month before its passage in the City Council, Wu and Mayor Marty Walsh co-authored an op-ed in The Boston Globe calling paid parental leave, "a must for working families". Mayor Walsh signed the ordinance into law in May. Wu had conceived this legislation after her own first pregnancy when she learned firsthand (after giving birth in December 2014) that municipal employees were not being offered paid child leave.

In 2017, the Council passed the Ordinance on Equity in Opportunity for City Contracting, which was sponsored by Wu and Councilor Ayanna Pressley. It required that the city create a supplier diversity program to conduct outreach to female and minority-owned businesses in regards to the city contracting process. It also required the city to actively solicit bids from at least one female-owned business and one minority-owned business for contracts under $50,000. It also created a quarterly reporting requirement for the city.

In February 2014, the Boston City Council unanimously passed a resolution authored by Wu which voiced the City Council's support for the Massachusetts Domestic Workers' Bill of Rights that was pending before the Massachusetts State Legislature.

Wu voiced support for a “fair work week”, $15 minimum wage, paid family and medical leave, protections for freelancerss. In October 2018, Wu proposed a "fair work week" ordinance, which would have required all city contractors to give employees at least two weeks of notice prior to changing their schedules, and would require employers to compensate workers for late schedule changes.

=== Small business ===
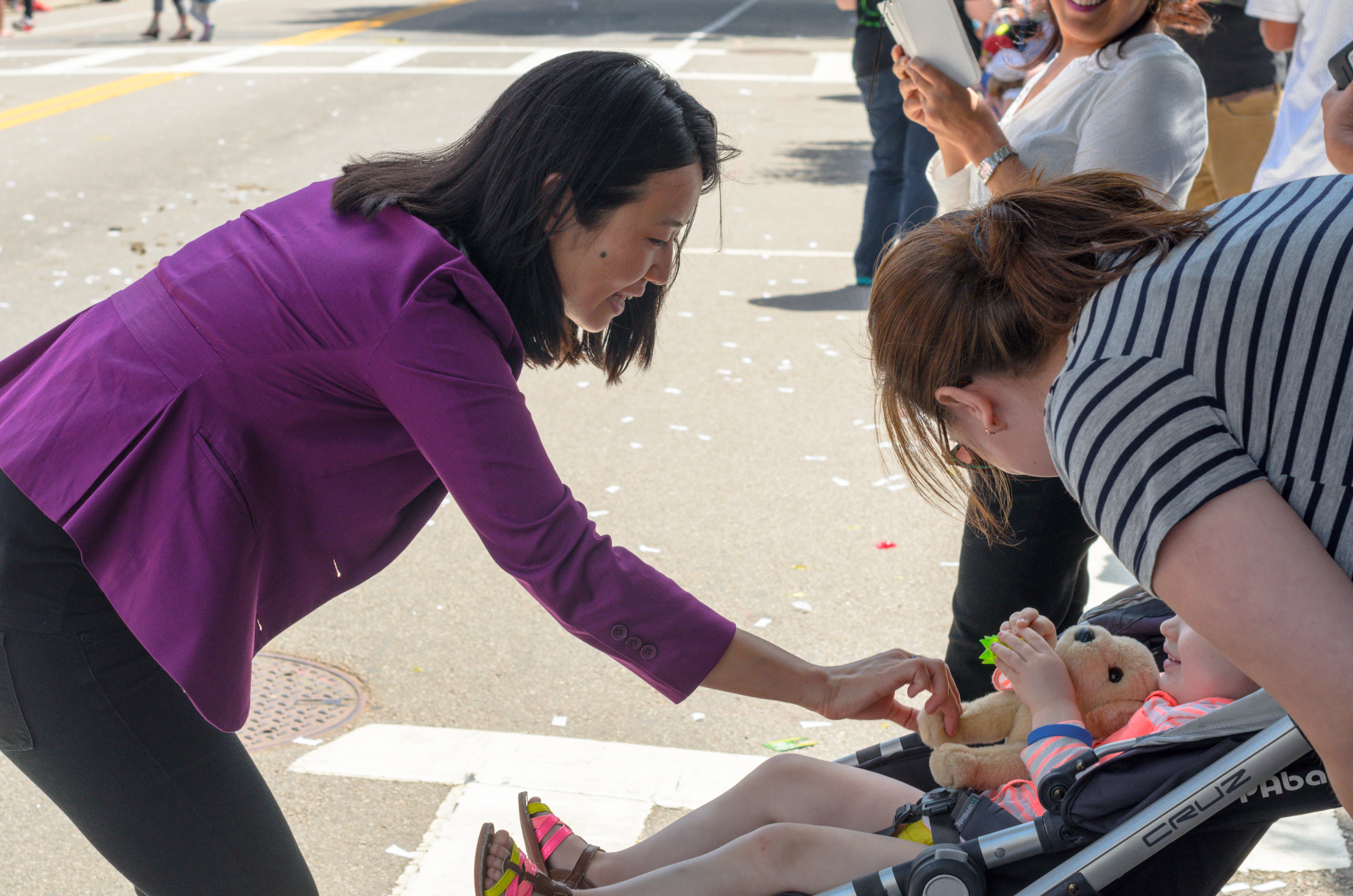
Wu at the 2015 Dorchester Day Parade

In 2014, Wu headed the Boston City Council Special Committee on Small Business, Entrepreneurship, and Innovation. In June 2014, it released a report making 25 recommendations to streamline the city's licensing and permitting process for small businesses.

Wu supported councilor Ayanna Pressley's efforts to have control over the number of liquor licenses in Boston transferred from the state government to localized control. The state capped the number of licenses in the city, and existing licenses could be privately transferred from one owner to another. Wu criticized the great expense to obtain a license as unfair to small restaurants. In 2016, as City Council president, Wu and councilor Stephen J. Murphy sponsored a successful law change to allow diners to bring their own alcoholic drinks into certain restaurants ("BYOB"), a move meant to promote economic vitality and assist restaurants unable to afford liquor licenses to better compete with those that have such licenses.

In January 2017, the city adopted an ordinance that Wu had introduced which allowed small businesses to forgo the fees and the bureaucratic approval process to host musical performances. In July 2018, Wu, along with fellow city councilors Lydia Edwards and Kim Janey, introduced legislation to remove as-of-right designations for chain stores, thereby requiring a conditional use permit for chain stores to open and operate in any area designated as a "neighborhood business district". Wu characterized the proposed ordinance as protecting small business from "commercial gentrification" and pressures from large retail chains. She declared, "this legislation supports jobs in our neighborhoods by giving residents and stakeholders a voice, so that our business districts are not just shaped by which multinational corporations can offer the highest rents".

== Environmental matters ==
In October 2017, the Boston City Council voted to unanimously approve a resolution by Wu and fellow councilor Matt O'Malley, having the city adopt Community Choice Aggregation. In November 2017, the Boston City Council unanimously passed an ordinance written by Wu and fellow councilor Matt O'Malley which implemented a plastic bag ban. In December, Mayor Walsh signed it into law, despite his administration having previously opposed such a ban when it was previously debated by the Council in 2016.

Shortly after Senator Ed Markey and Congresswoman Alexandria Ocasio-Cortez unveiled their congressional resolution to recognize a duty of the Federal Government to create a Green New Deal, Wu introduced a resolution to the Boston City Council to declare the council's support for the proposed federal resolution and urge the federal government to adopt it. In April 2019, the Boston City Council passed the resolution. In December 2019, the Boston City Council passed an ordinance that Wu had introduced with Matt O'Malley that protects local wetlands and promotes adaption to climate change. Mayor Walsh signed it into law later that month. Wu also partnered with Councilor Kenzie Bok on a proposal aiming to create more affordable and climate resilient housing. For years, beginning in 2014, Wu spearheaded efforts to have the city divest its financial resources from fossil fuels. She would partner with City Councilors Matt O'Malley and Lydia Edwards on this matter. Wu would ultimately sign such an ordinance into law days into her mayoralty.

In 2019, Wu marched in a protest with Extinction Rebellion Boston.

=== Proposal for a municipal Green New Deal ===
In August 2020, Wu released plans for "Boston Green New Deal & Just Recovery" program. The proposal aims to achieve carbon neutrality (net-zero carbon footprint) for the municipal government buildings by 2024, running the city on 100% renewable energy by 2030, and achieving citywide carbon neutrality by 2040. The proposal calls for creating "just and resilient development" through the establishment of affordable green overlay districts and standard community benefits agreements; priority planning zones informed by urban heat island maps, in order to expand the urban tree canopy; and a "local blue new deal" for coasts and oceans, using coastal and ocean resources for clean energy generation, sustainable food systems, carbon capture, and jobs.

== Food justice ==
In March 2019, the City Council unanimously passed the Good Food Purchasing Program ordinance authored by Wu. The ordinance set new requirements for public food purchasers, such as Boston Public Schools. The new policy, supported by the Food Chain Workers Alliance, pushes the city towards greater purchasing of local and sustainably grown food, and focuses on racial equity in the food chain. In October 2020, Wu published a report on a "food justice" agenda in Boston; The agenda includes increasing the minimum wage for food-sector workers and providing guaranteed paid sick leave to them. The plan also calls for the city government to support state legislation that would gradually phase out the tipped wage for restaurant and bar workers.

== Housing policy ==
Wu was a leading force in efforts to regulate short-term rentals of housing units. Wu pushed for increased restrictions, including the elimination of investor units. In April 2018, Wu was targeted by Airbnb for her stance over short-term rental regulations in the city of Boston. The short-term lodging platform accused Wu of being "aligned with big hotel interests against the interests of regular Bostonians". Boston adopted an ordinance, supported by Wu, that restricted short-term rentals to owner-occupied housing units, required hosts to register with the city, and required the city to collect and publish data on short-term rentals.

Wu, since at least 2019, supported the idea of reviving rent stabilization in Boston, which would first require a change to state law. She argued that it will assist in preventing people of color from being pushed out of Boston. While Wu and some other Boston City Council members came out in support of the idea of rent stabilization in 2019, it was a contentious issue in the city government, with other council members and Mayor Walsh voicing opposition to it.

== Law enforcement and public safety policy ==
In June 2020, the Boston City Council unanimously passed an ordinance co-sponsored by Wu and Councilor Ricardo Arroyo which (when enacted) made Boston the second-largest city in the United States to ban the use of facial recognition system surveillance by the city government. Among her rationales for the ordinance, Wu cited studies that had demonstrated that such technology falsely-identified people of color at far greater rates than it did white people, meaning its use in law enforcement would exacerbate inequities. She also argued that such technology would infringe on privacy and other rights of residents, and would undermine community trust towards the city government. Wu opined that, "community trust is the foundation for public safety and public health."

In June 2020, Wu, alongside fellow city councilors Lydia Edwards and Julia Mejia, introduced an ordinance that would establish an unarmed community safety crisis response system, moving the response to nonviolent 9-1-1 calls away from the Boston Police Department, and instead transferring the response to non-law enforcement agencies and trained health professionals. In 2020, Wu was one of eight city councilors to sign a letter urging Mayor Walsh to decrease the Boston Police Department's annual budget by 10%. Activists had been calling for such a cut, in order to instead allot that money to COVID-19 relief, housing and food access, and other programs that would benefit communities of color. In June 2020, Wu (along with Ricardo Arroyo, Andrea Campbell, Kim Janey, and Julia Mejia) was one of five members of the Boston City Council to vote against Mayor Walsh's 2021 operating budget for the city. While the budget made $12 million in cuts to the overtime budget of the police department, Wu argued that the city was still contractually obligated to pay for every hour of overtime work, meaning that it was inconsequential what the line item in the city budget proposed.

Wu voiced her desire to "demilitarize" the city's police department. She led an effort to take account of the Boston Police Department's military equipment. In June 2020, she introduced an order to the City Council that, if passed, would have required the disclosure of information about the Boston Police Department's heavy-duty equipment, and regarding how it had been deployed during recent protests. In Boston, such City Council orders require the backing of all City Council members. She advocated for closing loopholes in the policy of the Boston Police Department regarding body cameras. Wu and fellow councilor Ayanna Pressley were credited as being the key figures that arranged for the Boston City Council to hold hearings on gun violence.

== Transportation policy ==
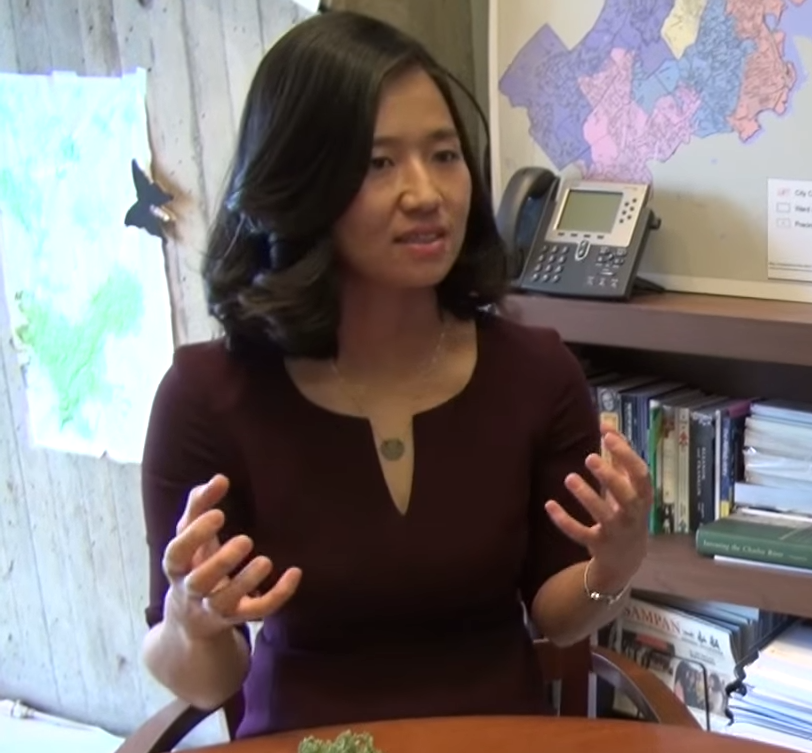
Wu in 2018

Wu advocated for late night public transit in her original platform when running for City Council in 2012. In this vein, in 2015, she voiced her support for having the MBTA extend its pilot "late-night T" program, which kept transit service open late on the weekends when it ran as a pilot program from 2014 through 2016. In April 2016, Wu filed a home rule petition seeking for the city to be able to offer an annual excise tax break to electric vehicle owners. In 2019, Wu was the lead sponsor on a City Council proposal that would have established a fee for resident parking permits. Her proposal exempted low-income residents, home-healthcare workers, and certain school workers from the fee.

Wu also called for local representation on the governing board of the Massachusetts Bay Transportation Authority (MBTA). In 2018, as the MBTA was proposing fare increases, Wu introduced a measure calling for the Boston City Council to hold hearings about the possibility of withholding its local payments to the MBTA in protest of the quality of its service. The proposed measure was not acted upon. In the early summer of 2019, Wu led protests against the MBTA's fare hikes and the inferior quality of its subway, light-rail, and bus line services.

Wu was credited with laying the groundwork for several transit initiatives that Mayor Walsh adopted.

Wu proposed eliminating fares for local public transit. Wu argued that the MBTA should explore the possibility of eliminating fares in a January 31, 2019 op-ed published in The Boston Globe. Later in 2019, she and fellow councilor Kim Janey proposed making the MBTA Route 28 bus fare-free. Janey would later fund a pilot program to make the bus route fare-free for three months while acting mayor in 2021. As mayor, Wu would later expandec the pilot program, adding two additional routes to serve other lower-income areas of the city free of charge for all riders beginning March 1, 2022, and extending for two years. Wu's advocacy is seen as popularizing the idea of fare-free public transportation in Boston. Crediting Wu as a leader on fare-free public transit, in January 2021, the editorial board of The Boston Globe endorsed the idea of making the city's buses fare-free. Wu's promotion of fare-free public transit also inspired Lawrence, Massachusetts mayor Daniel Rivera to implement it in his city.

== Zoning and construction permitting ==
Wu advocated for reforming the city's permitting system. Wu called for the abolition of the Boston Planning & Development Agency, which she characterized as being extremely politicized and "opaque". In 2019, her office published a 72-page report on the matter. Wu came into conflict with Mayor Walsh over his appointees to the city's Zoning Board of Appeals.

In 2015, Wu joined fellow at-large councilors Stephen J. Murphy and Ayanna Pressley in opposing a proposed Lewis Wharf hotel development.

== Positions on Boston's bid for the 2024 Olympics ==
In January 2015, (days after Boston was initially selected to be the United States' bid city to host the 2024 Summer Olympics) Wu published an op-ed on WGBH's website in which she called for there to her greater public transparency about the bid's details. Wu expressed hope in the proposal for claims that a 2024 Olympics in Boston would be,

A walkable Olympics leveraging university facilities and private sponsorships, instead of public funding, to produce economic opportunities, affordable housing, and time on the world stage.

While she expressed that an Olympic Games held in the city could be successful, she believed that there needed to be public input, writing,

If there is any city that could do the Olympics differently and do it right, Boston is the one. But meaningful conversation requires informed participation, with full access to budgets and plans, and full knowledge of interested parties that stand to benefit. Boston 2024’s successful proposal to the USOC still has not been released to the public.

In the op-ed, Wu outlined four steps that she believed that the city needed to take in order for a potential Olympics in the city to be successful:

- Facilitating the immediate publication of information related to the bid as it emerges
- Engaging local experts in crafting the plan for a games in the city, as well as the plan for related post-games development
- Having the city councils of each municipality in which venues will be located vote on whether they want their community to participate in hosting the Olympics
- Holding the nonprofit bid committee to the same disclosure standards as government entities

In promoting her proposals for greater public input, Wu argued that it would benefit public support for a bid, increasing the city's score when the International Olympic Committee would assess the city on the criteria of local support for its bid.

By March 2015, Wu had grown more critical of the city's bid, and remarked during hearings on the bid that, "Boston doesn't need to host the Olympics to be a world-class city." During a hearing in May 2015, Wu expressed concern that the city would be violating the Boston City Charter if it signed an agreement to pay for cost overruns related to hosting the games. Wu argued that she believed that the charter required for all municipal appropriations to be for specified amounts, and that agreeing to provide an unlimited guarantee to pay for all overruns would violate that.

After the collapse of Boston's bid, the organization No Boston Olympics (which had opposed the bid) endorsed Wu and three other incumbent Boston City Council members for reelection, praising them for "Demonstrat[ing] leadership by asking tough questions" to the leaders behind Boston's Olympic bid.

== COVID-19 pandemic ==
In early 2020, when the COVID-19 pandemic had just spread to the United States, Wu and Councilor Matt O'Malley jointly urged the city council to hold a hearing on the city's plans for addressing the pandemic.

Wu criticized some of Mayor Walsh's pandemic-related initiatives. She took specific issue with some of Walsh's COVID-19 initiative, which as the Boston Resiliency Fund and Racial Equity Fund, that solicited private sector donor funding, saying that "Philanthropy is wonderful" but that the government soliciting money from corporations and distributing it to nonprofits "creates a very disruptive and dangerous dynamic" with the effect of "distorting the political process." She criticized Walsh over a lack of minority-owned businesses receiving emergency coronavirus-related contracts (less than 2% of the $12 million in such contracts issued prior to July 2020 went to Boston-located minority-owned businesses, with only one such business being among eighty businesses to receive such contracts per data the Walsh administration had provided).

Wu called for the city to facilitate an "equitable recovery" from the pandemic, chairing City Council hearings in 2020 on promoting equity in the city's recovery.

In February 2021, Wu proposed legislation that would seek to create an equitable distribution of the COVID-19 vaccine in Boston by requiring that at least one vaccination site be established in each residential neighborhood. She also partnered with fellow city councilor Annissa Essaibi George to propose a measure that would provide paid leave to municipal employees who felt ill after receiving the vaccine.

In early August 2021, Wu criticized Acting Mayor Kim Janey for failing to commit to require city workers to be vaccinated against COVID-19. Wu supported a mandate for city workers, including public school employees, to be vaccinated. Fellow mayoral candidates John Barros and Essaibi George opposed this.

In August 2021, Wu voiced support for implementing a vaccine passport program, requiring proof-of-vaccination for indoor dining and other public indoor activities. Fellow mayoral candidate Andrea Campbell had, days before Wu, made similar calls for the city to put in place rules which would require that many businesses require patrons provide proof of vaccination.

In the late summer of 2021, Wu's council office compiled data that suggested that half of the city's Restaurant Revitalization Fund money that had been allocated to restaurants was given to establishments in only three of the city's 23 neighborhoods (Back Bay, Downtown Boston, and the Seaport District). It was noted that these were largely white and wealthy neighborhoods in comparison to the rest of the city. In June 2021, she expressed support for having a municipal eviction moratorium once the federal eviction moratorium expired.

== Healthcare ==
In June 2014, the Boston City Council unanimously passed an ordinance Wu coauthored with fellow councilwoman Ayanna Pressley, which prohibits Boston's city government, "from contracting with any health insurer that denies coverage or discriminates in the amount of premium, policy fees, or rates charged...because of gender identity or expression". This ordinance guaranteed healthcare (including gender reassignment surgery, hormone therapy, and mental health services) to transgender city employees and dependents. Wu called the ordinance, "a matter of equity and of fairness". The ordinance had the support of Mayor Walsh prior to its passage.

In 2019, Wu partnered Massachusetts Attorney General Maura Healey, Congresswoman Ayanna Presley, and City Councilor Lydia Edwards in a digital campaign aimed at persuading Massachusetts state lawmakers to adopt the Roe Act, a proposed state statue intended to codify the protections of abortion care provided in the Roe v. Wade U.S. Supreme Court decision (which was still good law at the time).

== Other matters ==
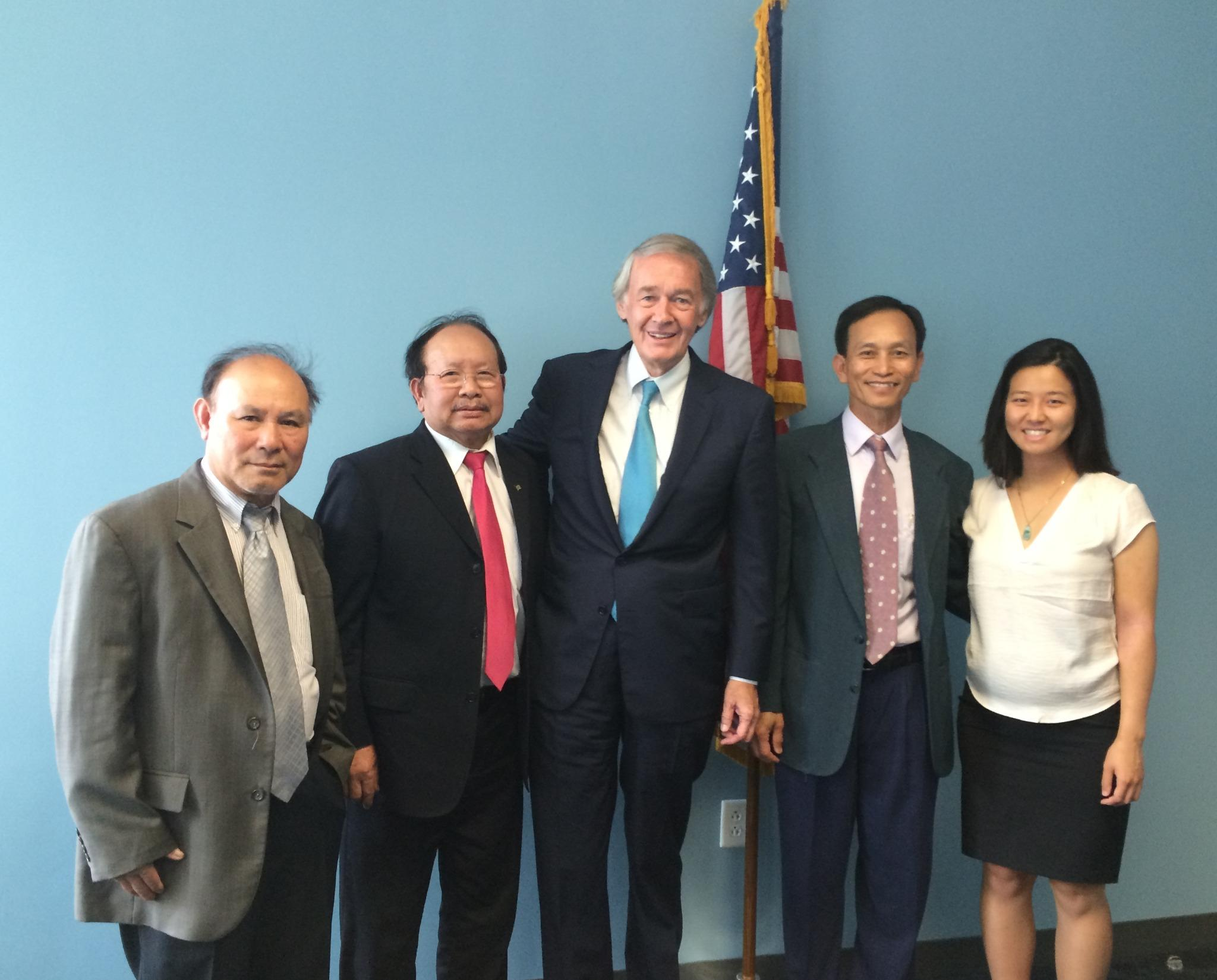
Wu (far right) and others meet with U.S. Senator Ed Markey (center) in 2014

In August 2015, Wu voted against a measure championed by Linehan to raise councilor salaries. She publicly expressed her annoyance that Linehan had revived his efforts to raise councilor salaries.

In April 2016, Wu was the sole member of the Boston City council to vote against a home rule petition that requested for the state to allow the city to extend the terms of city councilors from two years to four years. Wu cited worry that longer terms would increase the fundraising advantage of incumbent city councilors over challengers and would discourage political outsiders from running. Ultimately, the state government did not approve the home rule petition. In February 2019, Wu was joined by Josh Zakim in voting against another such petition which advanced from the council by a vote of 11–2.

In 2018, Wu proposed legislation that would establish a city identification card program in Boston. Wu was a leading force in the years-long effort that established the Boston Little Saigon Cultural District.

In 2019, Wu supported a proposed ordinance introduced by Councilor Kim Janey which aimed to ensure that the legal cannabis industry in Boston would be equitable and fair for racial minority owners. This plan, in part, works to do so by only issuing business licenses to qualifying equity applicants for a period of two-years. The ordinance also included a new oversight board to assess and vote on applications for licenses based on a set criteria. It was by the City Council in November 2019. Walsh signed the ordinance into law later that month.

In September 2017, the Boston City Council voted to approve a home rule petition authored by Wu which, if approved by the Massachusetts State Legislature, would have given the mayor of Boston the power to appoint members to vacant or expired seats on certain municipal boards and commissions in the incident that the nominating entity failed to submit names within 90 days of being notified of the vacancy. It would have also made it so that all municipal boards and commissions in Boston would have a residency requirement.

Wu partnered with fellow councilor Kim Janey to probe the city's process for awarding municipal contracts, finding that only 1% municipal contracts were going to women and minority-owned vendors. These findings were the impetus for a subsequent move by the city to start looking at ways to diversify the recipients of city contracts.

== Other political activity as city councilor ==
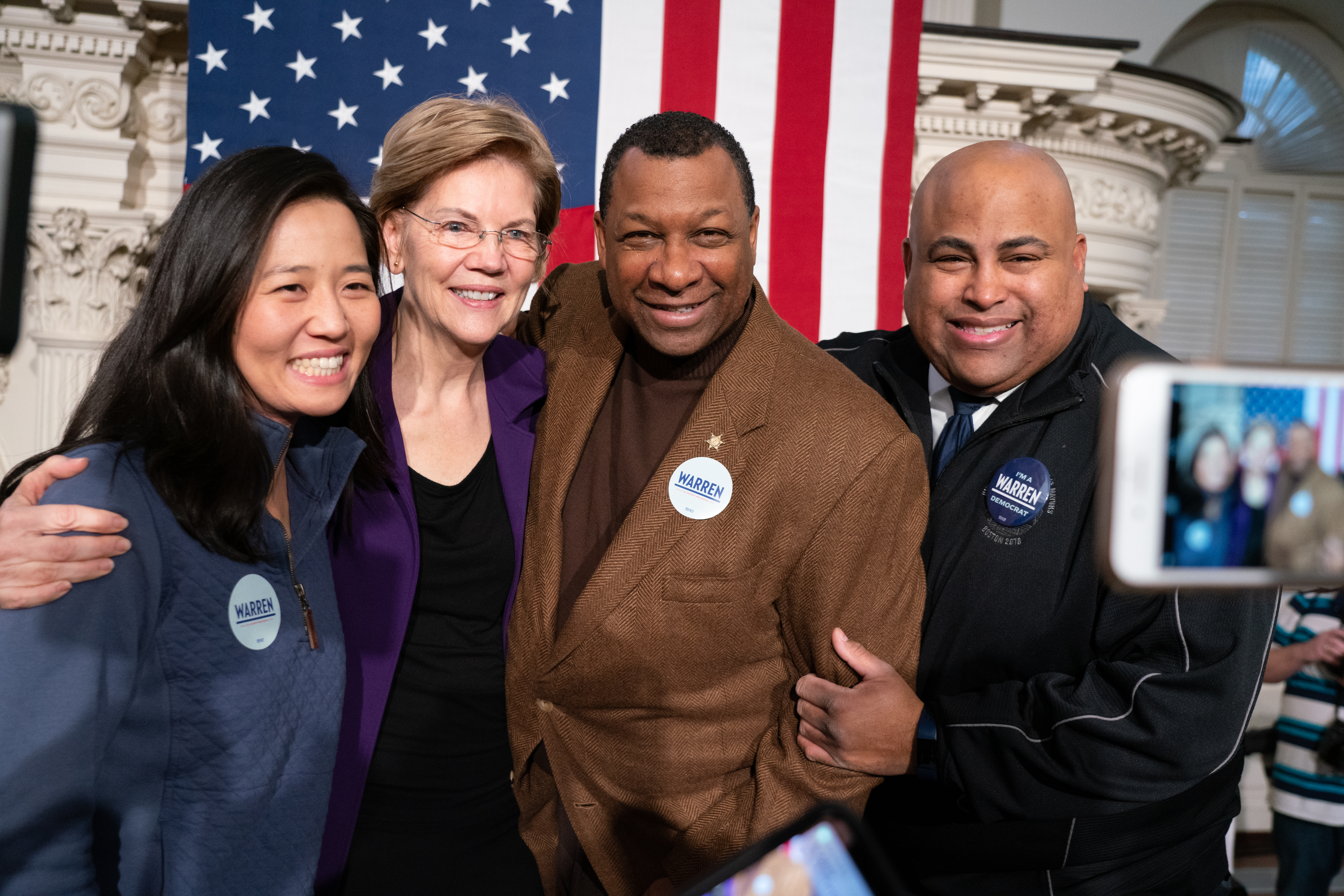
Wu with U.S. Senator Elizabeth Warren; Suffolk County Sheriff Steven W. Tompkins; and Lawrence, Massachusetts Mayor Dan Rivera at an event for Warren's 2020 presidential campaign

In 2016, Wu endorsed Lydia Edwards' unsuccessful campaign in the special election for the Suffolk and Middlesex Massachusetts Senate district. During the 2016 Democratic Party presidential primary, Wu endorsed the candidacy of Hillary Clinton.

Wu was among the earliest supporters of Ayanna Pressley's successful 2018 Democratic primary election challenge to incumbent U.S. congressman Mike Capuano. In the 2018 election cycle, Wu also endorsed Jay Gonzalez's unsuccessful campaign in the Massachusetts gubernatorial election. She also endorsed State Senator Byron Rushing in his unsuccessful 2018 reelection campaign.

Wu endorsed Elizabeth Warren's 2020 presidential campaign in a speech at Warren's official campaign launch in February 2019. Wu was a campaign surrogate for Warren, campaigning on her behalf in New Hampshire and Iowa ahead of those states' primary and caucuses, respectively.

== Recognition received ==
At the end of 2013, the readers of Boston magazine voted Wu to be named the magazine's 2013 "Rookie of the Year", one three political awards given by the magazine that year. In 2016, Frank Bruni of The New York Times named Wu as one of the United States', "14 Young Democrats to Watch". In 2017, the Massachusetts Democratic Party awarded Wu its Franklin and Eleanor Roosevelt Award, which it considers its highest honor. In March 2018, Wu was among six finalists to be honored as a "Rising Star" by EMILY's List, a national group that supports female Democratic candidates who support abortion rights. The next month, Wu was listed as one of the "100 Most Influential People in Boston" by Boston magazine, being listed 31st on the list, which opined, "Ambitious, smart, and just 33 years old, Wu is positioned to be a force in this town for decades to come." In 2019, Rachel Allen of The Atlantic wrote that Wu had emerged as one of Boston's "most effective politicians".

== Election as mayor and departure from the council ==
Two weeks after being elected mayor of Boston in the 2021 Boston mayoral election, Wu left the City Council and was sworn in as mayor.

With Wu vacating her city council seat before the end of her term in order to assume the mayoralty, by Boston City Charter, the opportunity to serve the remainder of the term Wu had been elected to in 2017 was to be offered to the first runner-up of the 2017 election. In this instance, that was Alejandra St. Guillen. Initially planning to accept the opportunity to serve the remainder of Wu's term, due to ethics concerns about matters such as St. Guillen also holding on the city's cannabis board, St. Guillen ultimately declined to accept the position. Thereafter, per the Boston City Charter, the remainder of Wu's term was offered to Erin Murphy, who was the second runner-up in the 2017 election. Murphy accepted the opportunity. Murphy had recently won election to a full term in the 2019 at-large city council election, and thus would effectively be starting her tenure on the city council earlier by accepting. Murphy was sworn in by Mayor Wu on December 1, 2021.

== See also ==
- Politics of Boston
- Boston City Council tenure of Ayanna Pressley
