= Boston City Council tenure of Ayanna Pressley =

- Pressley in 2011

Member of the Boston City Council at-large
- In office January 4, 2010 – January 3, 2019
- Preceded by: Michael F. Flaherty; Sam Yoon
- Succeeded by: Althea Garrison

Ayanna Pressley was first elected to the Boston City Council in November 2009, and served as an at-large member from January 2010 until joining the United States House of Representatives in January 2019. Upon being sworn in as a city councilor on January 4, 2010, she became the first woman of color to serve in the Boston City Council up to that point.

Pressley was one of the more liberal members of the council. She placed a strong focus to women's and children's issues during her tenure. She also focused on liquor license reform, protections against anti-transgender discrimination in municipal employee healthcare coverage, and matters related to schools.

Candidates seeking one of the four at-large seats on the Boston City Council all run in the same multi-seat election. In her 2011 election, Pressley placed fourth. In her 2011, 2013, and 2015 re-elections, Pressley was the top vote-getter in the at-large race. In her 2017 re-election, she placed second. After her 2013 re-election, she unsuccessfully made a last-minute bid for the city council presidency at the first meeting the new council session in January 2014.

== Elections ==
=== 2009 ===
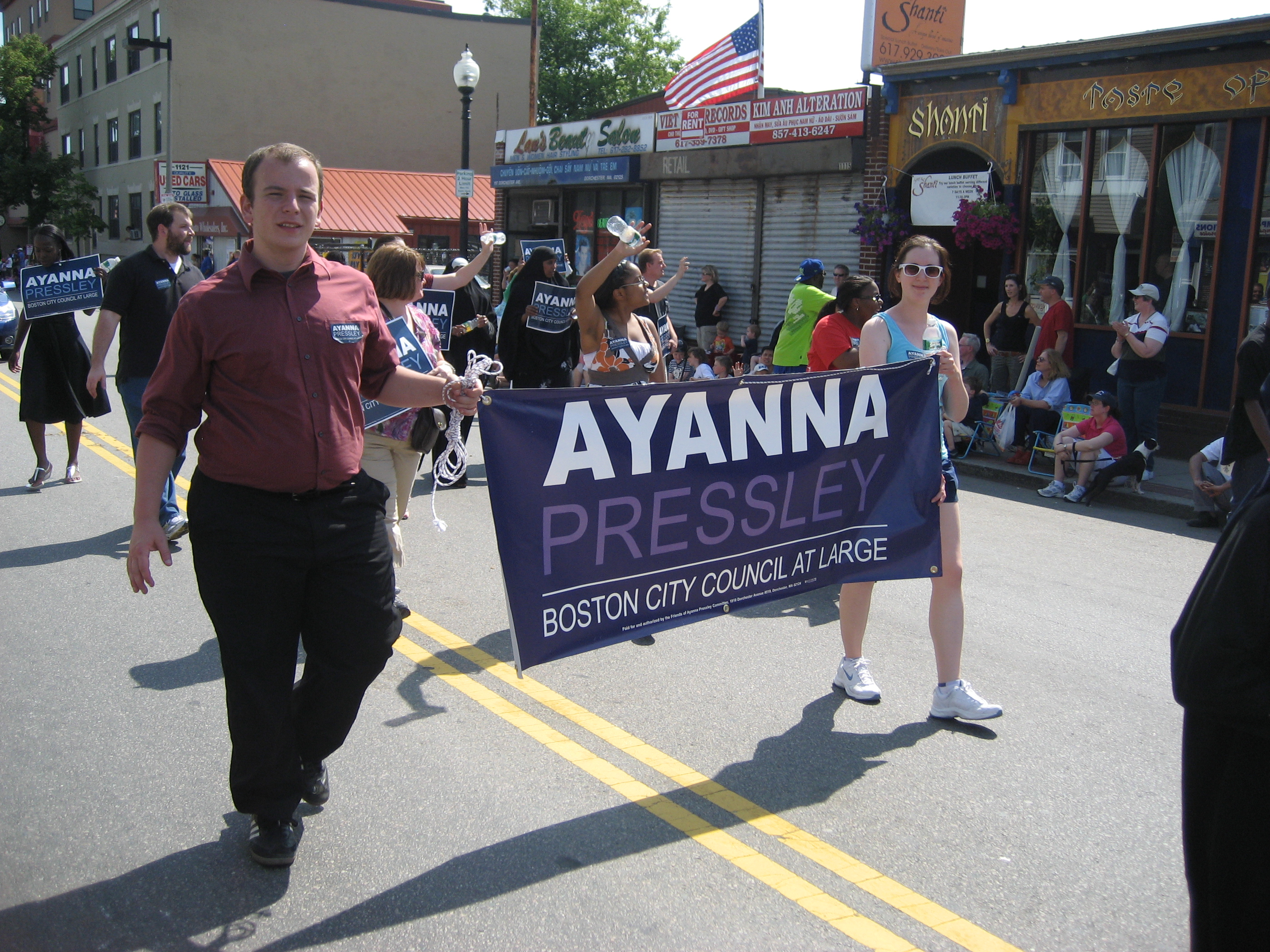
Supporters of Pressley's 2009 Boston City Council campaign march in the 2009 Dorchester Day Parade

Pressley was first elected in November 2009. The only woman in a field of 15 candidates, Pressley won one of the four at-large spots on the city's 13-member council with nearly 42,000 votes.

Upon her entrance in to the race, the Dorchester Reporter's Pete Stidman regarded her to be one of the "favorite" candidates to be elected due to her experience and resume from her eleven years of working for Senator John Kerry, including as his political director; as well her experience working as a district director for Congressman Joseph P. Kennedy II before that. Pressley recounted that colleagues from her work as a political staffer had encouraged her to run.

=== 2011 ===
In the Boston City council election of 2011, Pressley finished first among at-large candidates with 37,000 votes. She led in 13 of the city's 22 wards and finished second in three others. Pressley won Boston's communities of color and many progressive neighborhoods. In all, she placed first in more than half of Boston's 22 wards. Pressley was the first person of color to ever be the top vote-getter in a Boston City Council election.

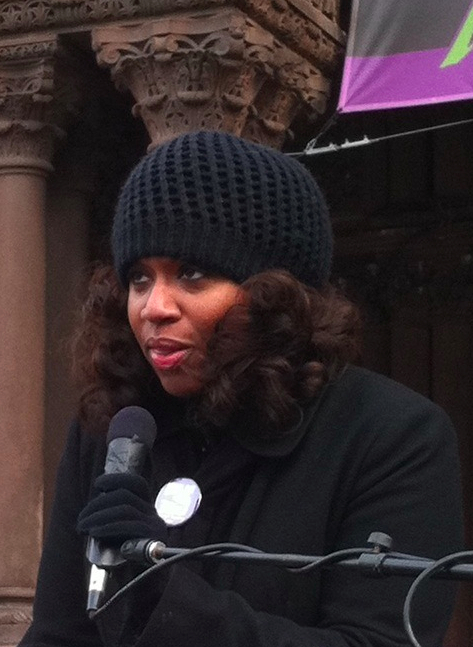
Pressley speaking in 2011

Pressley's first-place finish was regarded as a surprise and a political turnaround, as many had expected she might not even win reelection. The perception that Pressley was at risk of losing her seat after her first term arose due to her campaign's lack of funding and the fact that former councilor Michael F. Flaherty was running to unseat one of the incumbent at-large councilors and regain a seat for himself. Politician prognosticators had seen Pressley as the most vulnerable of the incumbent at-large city councilors. This, in part, arose from a perception that, as first-term members, both Pressley and Felix G. Arroyo were more likely to lose their seats than longer-tenured at-large members John R. Connolly and Stephen J. Murphy. In his previous city council tenure, Flaherty had been able to be the top vote-getter in at-large city council elections, which made his candidacy to rejoin the council be seen as formidable. Additionally, mid-mayoral-term elections had historically tended to have a more white and conservative electorate than ones in mayoral election years, which meant that they were more favorable than mayoral election years towards white and more conservative candidates (such as Flaherty). However both Pressley and Arroyo (himself latino) were both re-elected alongside the other two incumbent at-large councilors, with Flaherty losing by placing fifth.

Pressley led the vote in more than half of the city's twenty-two wards. She performed strongly across a broad array of neighborhoods, including Roxbury, Jamaica Plain, and Roslindale and West Roxbury. Andrew Ryan of Boston.com wrote that Pressley received, "groundswell of support that in many neighborhoods transcended race and traditional politics." She performed extremely well in African-American neighborhoods. This included receiving a vote from 85% of voters in the ward where the Nubian Square community (at the named "Dudley Square") is located. She placed first in large portions of Jamaica Plain and Rosindale, and also placed second in the largely-white neighborhood of West Roxbury, receiving votes from 53% of voters in the neighborhood.

During her reelection campaign, Pressley and fellow at-large city councilor John R. Connolly supported each other's bids for re-election. The two held joint campaign events and coordinated their campaign calendars. Some minority communities in 2012 had a large number of two-candidate bullet votes in the at-large election (under-votes in which voters marked only two candidates in the at-large race, rather than the maximum of four candidates they were allowed to select). This appeared to mean that many in those neighborhoods voted only for Pressley and Connolly while forgoing selecting a further two candidates in order to boost the prospects of Presley and Connolly prevailing over all others.

In her campaign, Pressley made a concerted effort to engage and get out the vote among members of minority groups that were regarded to be among the city's lower-turnout demographics. However, she also made inroads with white voters. On election Day, her campaign ‘s turnout effort (after analyzing initial turnout reports from earlier hours of voting) made a decision to target some of their phonebanking towards voters in white-predominant communities that she had seen observable increases of support in.

The editorial board of The Boston Globe endorsed her for re-election, and also endorsed the other three incumbent at-large councilors.

=== 2013 ===
Pressley placed first again in the 2013 Boston City Council election. Pressley was endorsed for re-election by the editorial board of The Boston Globe.

Pressley remained neutral in the coinciding mayoral election, giving no public endorsement. Her neutrality was notable, since one of two finalists was John R. Connolly, with whom she had jointly campaigned for re-election to city council in 2011. Pressley stated that she was acquainted with both mayoral finalists (Connolly and Marty Walsh), and believed that either would make a good mayor.

=== 2015 ===
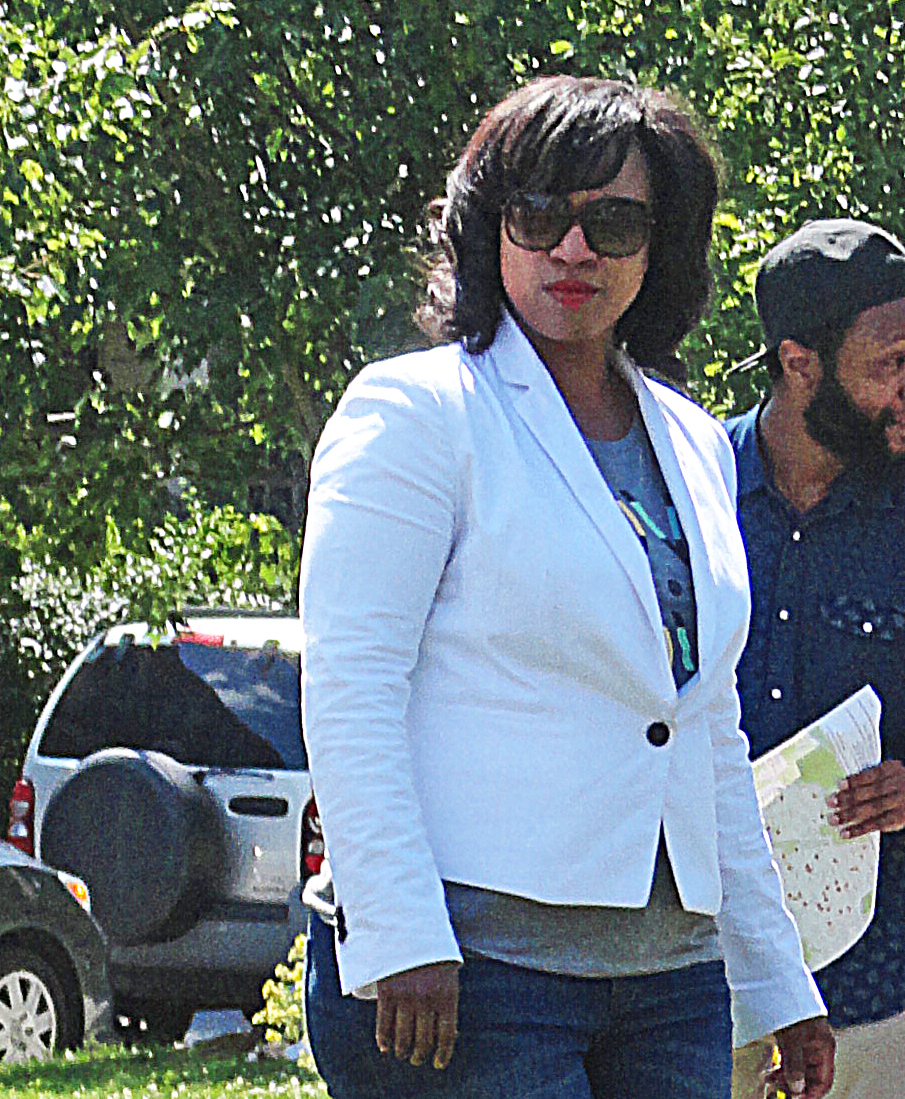
Pressley attending Jamaica Plain Porchfest in 2015

Pressley again placed first in the 2015 Boston City Council election. She was again endorsed by the editorial board of The Boston Globe.

=== 2017 ===
Pressley placed second in the 2017 Boston City Council election, behind only Michelle Wu. She was again endorsed by the editorial board of The Boston Globe. She was also endorsed by the Planned Parenthood Advocacy Fund of Massachusetts.

Pressley remained neutral in the coinciding mayoral election. Pressley's husband was a staffer of the incumbent mayor, Marty Walsh. She was an ally of both Walsh and his mayoral challenger, Tito Jackson. She considered Jackson to be a personal friend on the council. She stayed neutral due to her husband's employment by Walsh. Besides Pressley, Andrea Campbell was the only other city councilor to remain neutral. The ten remaining Boston City Councilors endorsed Walsh's reelection over the candidacy of their Boston City Council colleague, Jackson.

== Council politics ==
Pressley at the 2012 East Boston Columbus Day Parade

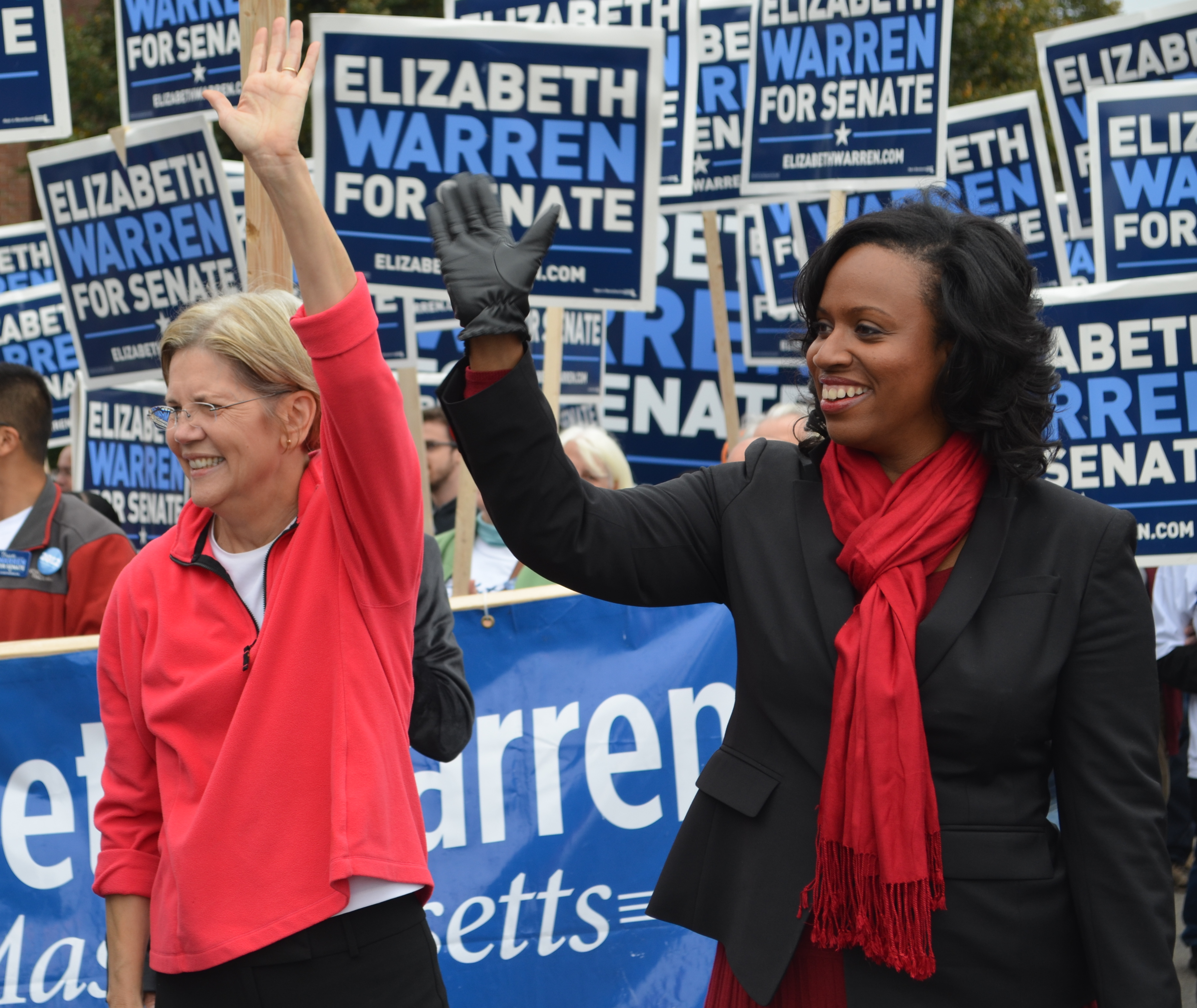
Pressley walks alongside Democratic U.S. Senate nominee Elizabeth Warren

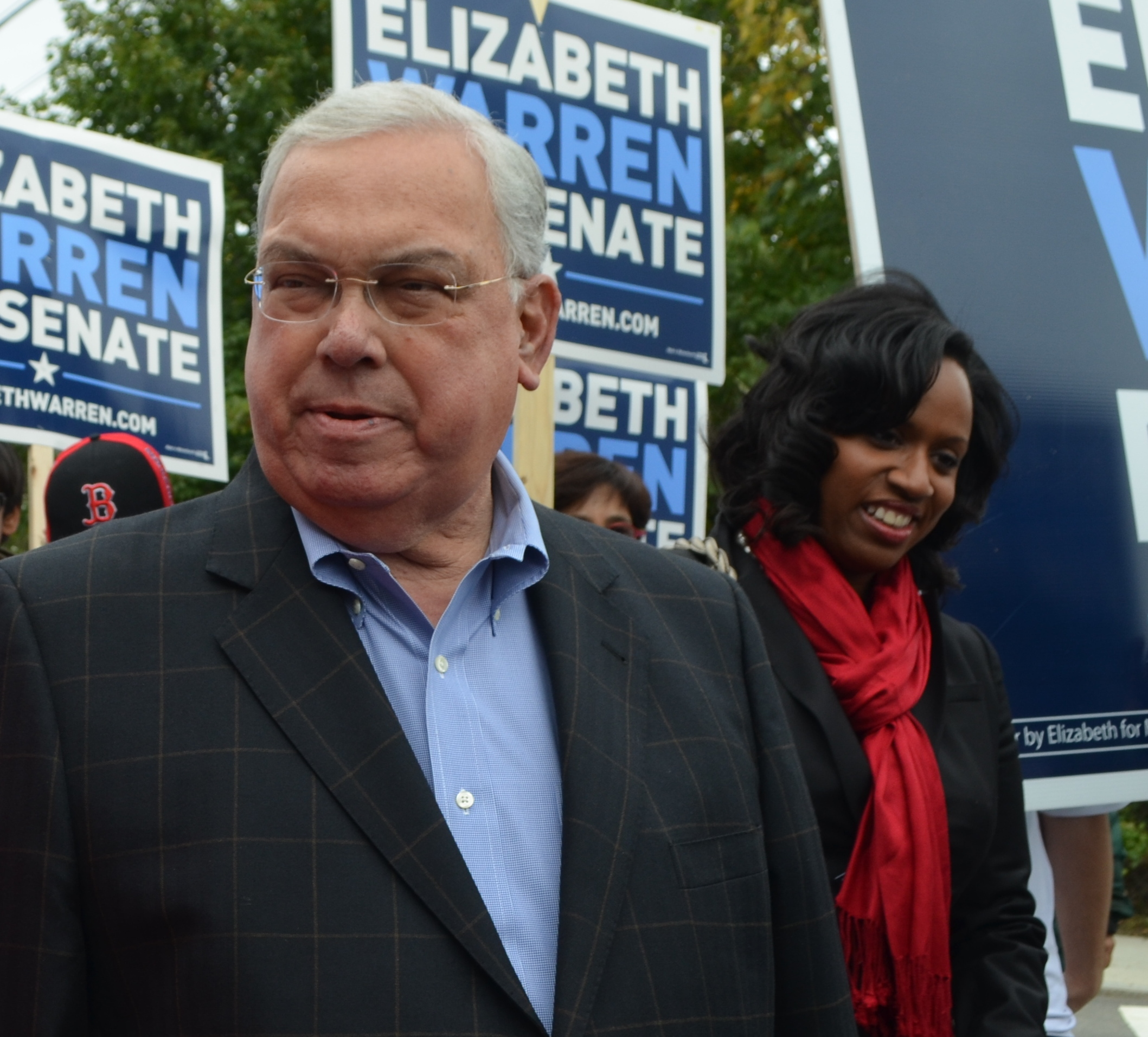
Pressley walks alongside Mayor Thomas Menino

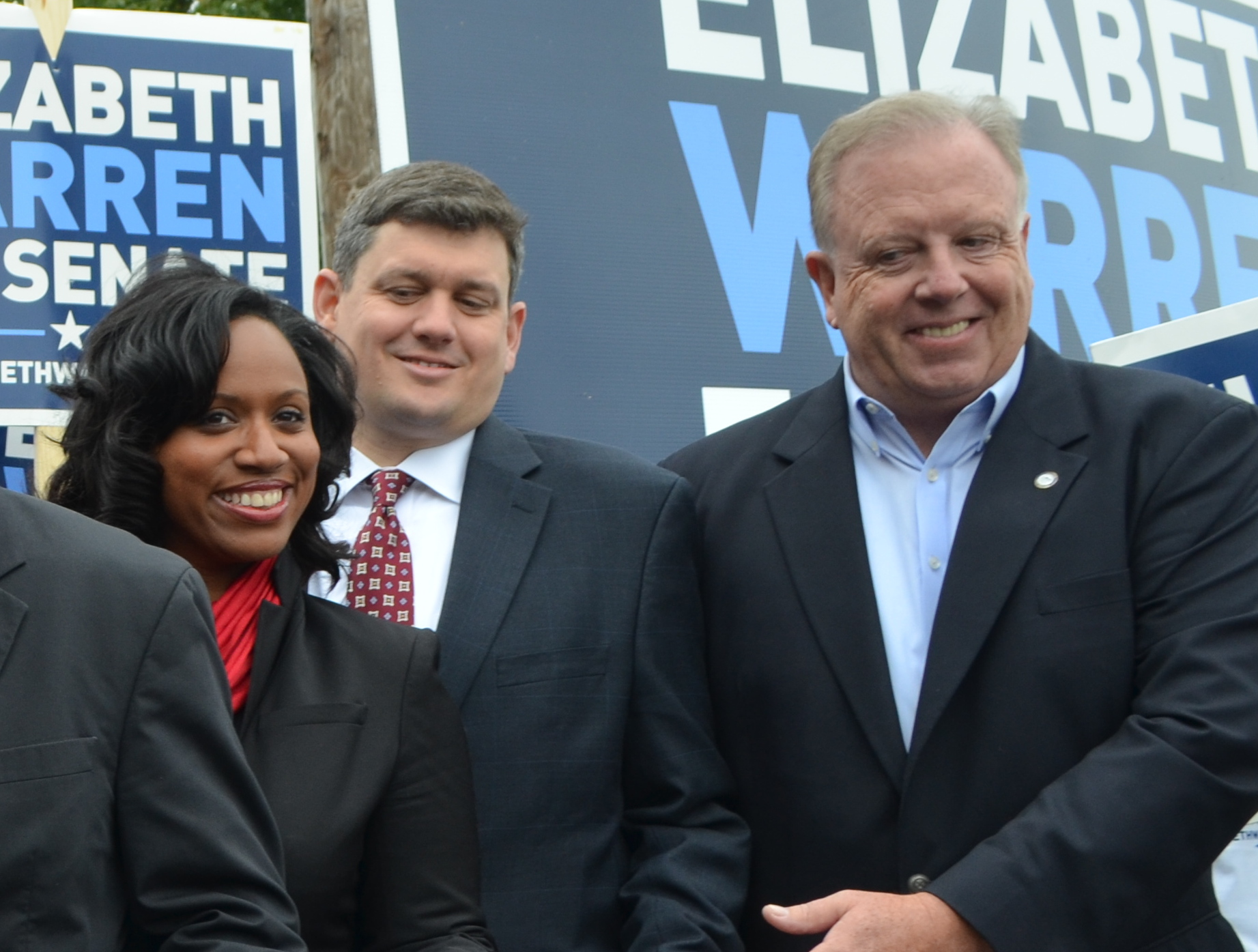
Pressley stands beside City Councilman John R. Connolly and City Council President Stephen J. Murphy

Upon being sworn in on January 4, 2010, Pressley was the first woman of color to serve in the 100-year history of the Boston City Council.

Pressley was regarded to be a high-profile figure on the council, even acquiring some national accolades. She received the "Rising Star" award from EMILY's List in 2015. In 2016, Frank Bruni of The New York Times named Pressley as one of the United States', "14 Young Democrats to Watch". Other recognition Pressley received included being named to Boston Magazines "Power of Ideas" list in 2014 and "Power Players" list in 2015; being a 2014 Greater Boston Chamber of Commerce "Ten Outstanding Young Leaders" honoree; and receiving the Victim Right's Law Center's "Leadership Award" in 2014.

=== Political alignment and ideology ===
Boston's strong mayor form of government conventionally limited the impact that members of the council had on the city government. However, part of Pressley's time on the City Council occurred during a period in which the council began to increasingly wield its power, with the body yielding less to the mayor than previous iterations of the council had in the preceding decades and making use of its subpoena powers for the first time in decades. In December 2019, Milton J. Valencia of The Boston Globe opined that, under the City Council presidencies of Michelle Wu (in 2016 and 2017) and Andrea Campbell (beginning in 2018), the council had "been, perhaps, the most aggressive in recent history in pushing reforms, often to the left of the mayor, on issues addressing climate change and economic and racial equity."

Pressley was a member of the council's liberal wing. Other members of this informal grouping included Michelle Wu and Lydia Edwards. According to Erin O'Brien, a political science professor at University of Massachusetts Boston, Pressley did not have the reputation for being controversial or an outsider during her time on the City Council. O'Brien, in 2018, observed that while some the city's "old guard" viewed Pressley as a "showboat" but that, "in many communities of color, she [was] viewed as incredibly exciting and voicing issues the council has ignored." Lee Fang and Zaid Jilani of The Intercept opined that Pressley shifted her politics more leftwards when she ran for congress in 2018.

=== Vote to expel Chuck Turner ===
In December 2011, Pressley voted to remove Councilor Chuck Turner from the City Council due to his October conviction for a felony bribery charge. Turner, who is black, had alleged that his conviction was racially motivated. Her vote to remove him from the City Council was seen as causing some backlash to her among the city's black community and was seen as creating political vulnerability for her. She would comment, on her vote, "I would have thought it cowardly to abstain..... I cast the ballot that I did because despite how hard it was, I thought it was the right thing to do in maintaining the integrity of the body and so as not to imperil my agenda."

=== Unsuccessful 2014 bid for the council presidency ===
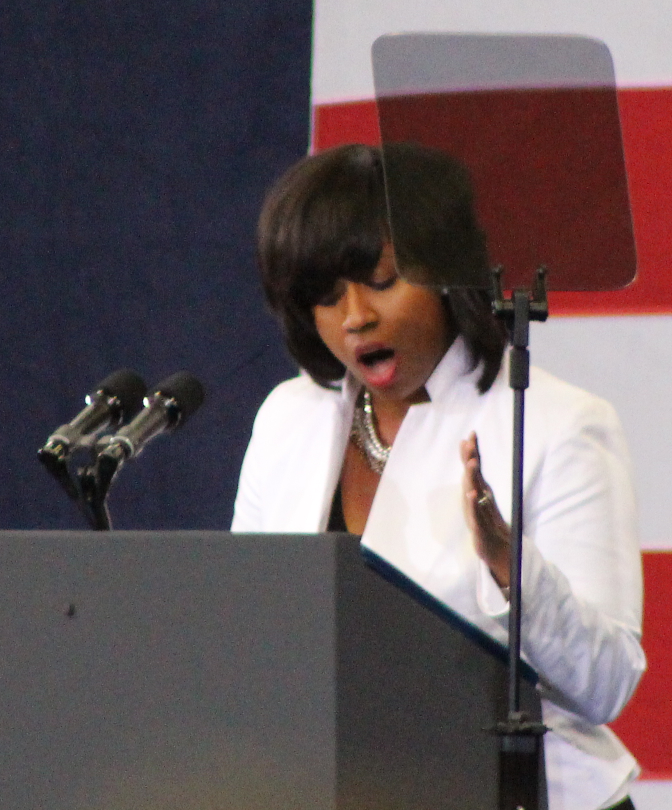
Pressley speaking at a Boston campaign rally for the 2013 Senate election campaign of Ed Markey

In 2014, Pressley made an unsuccessful last-minute bid for the presidency of the council. She was defeated by Bill Linehan 8–5. Pressley's bid was a last-minute effort, aiming to deny the council presidency to Linehan (considered to be the council's most conservative member) after Linehan had already secured pledges of support from a majority of council members.

Eleven out of thirteen councilors had been re-elected from the previous iteration. These returning councilors had a 5:6 split between those who were members of the liberal wing and those who were not. The five returning councilors who were members of the liberal wing were anticipated to unite against Linehan, while the other six councilors (including Linehan himself) were all but certain to line up behind Linehan. This dynamic meant that the vote for council president only had two obvious swing-votes, the two newly-elected members: Timothy McCarthy and Michelle Wu. It also meant that the liberal wing was expected to need both of their votes in order to prevail, while Linehan only needed the vote of a single newly-elected member.

After the preceding city council election in November 2013, Liberal member Matt O'Malley had initially sought election to be the next council president, at first managing to secure pledges of support from six councilors-elect (one shy of a majority). Critically however, councilor-elect Michelle Wu declined to commit her support to O'Malley, despite also being a part of the incoming council's liberal wing that was otherwise backing O'Malley's candidacy. O'Malley's prospects fell further once councilor-elect McCarthy (who had initially been among the six backing O'Malley) withdrew his backing from O'Malley, and instead gave his support instead to Linehan (securing Linehan support from a majority of members). Despite Linehan's own conservative leanings, he was soon able to also able to bolster his majority backing by also securing the backing of the progressive-leaning Wu, who cited her belief that Linehan would be effective an effective presiding officer, as well as agreements with a number of reforms he proposed to the structure and operations of the council. Wu's support was perceived as important to bolstering Linehan's path to election.

After O'Malley had failed to cobble together the support of a majority and Linehan had, Tito Jackson (another member of the liberal wing) made efforts at securing a majority support for himself (including siphoning at least one backer away from Linehan), but failed to amass a majority. Days before the inaugural meeting of the newly-elected council, the president of Boston's local NAACP chapter sent a mass email urging Bostonians to encourage councilors to support Pressley for council president. Thereafter, Pressley launched her last-minute candidacy. Councilors who voted for Linehan were himself, Wu, McCarthy, Frank Baker, Mark Ciommo, Michael F. Flaherty, Salvatore LaMattina, and Stephen J. Murphy. Those who voted for Pressley were herself, Jackson, O'Malley, Charles Yancey, and Josh Zakim.

== Social issues ==
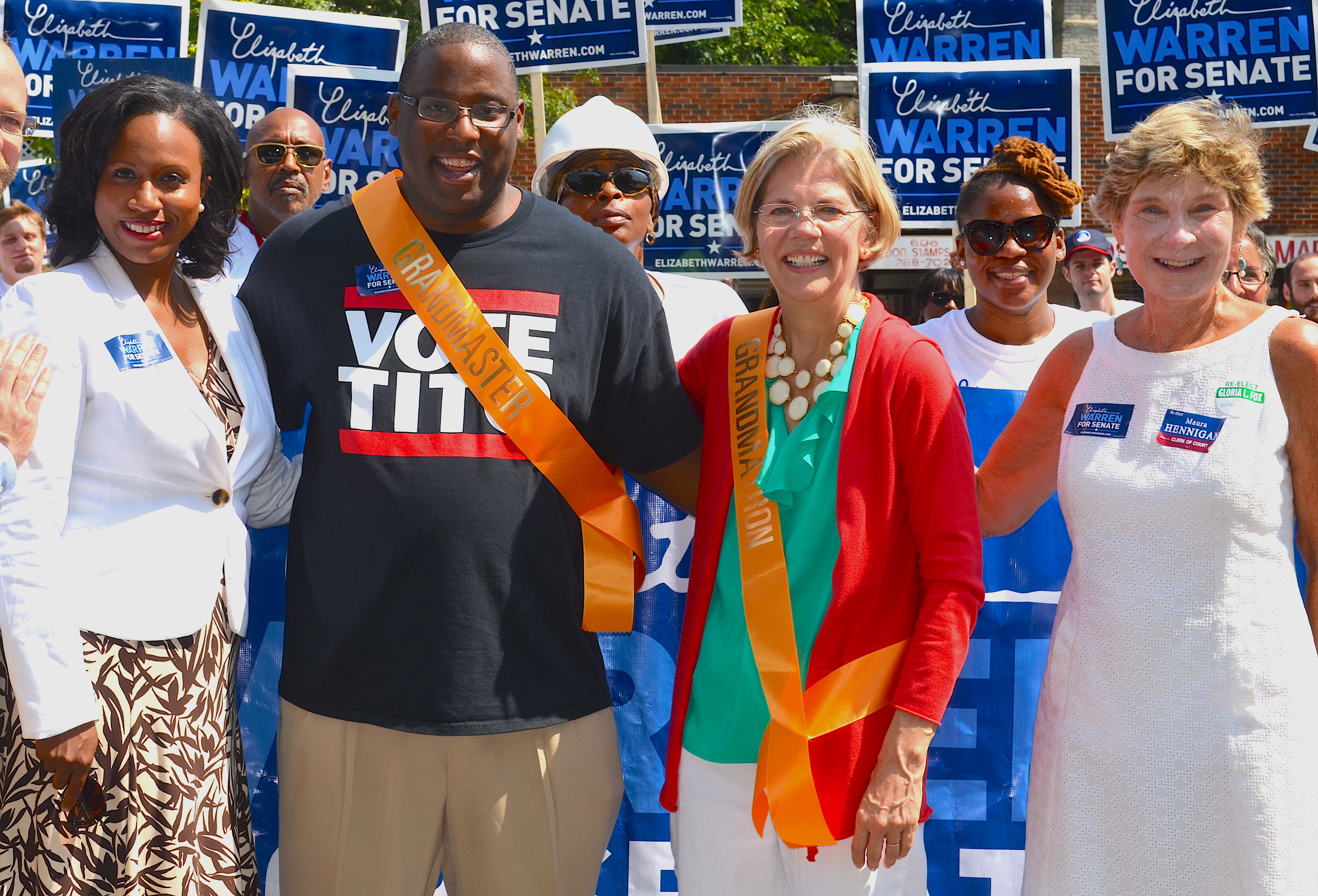
Pressley (far left) with fellow city councilor Tito Jackson, Democratic U.S. Senate nominee Elizabeth Warren, and clerk of the Suffolk County criminal courts Maura Hennigan at the Boston Caribbean Carnival parade in August 2012

Pressley placed a strong focus to women's and children's issues. In her first year as a city councilor, Pressley formed the Committee on Healthy Women, Families, and Communities, which addressed issues such as domestic violence, child abuse, and human trafficking. This is today known as the "Strong Women, Families and Communities Committee".

In March 2011, Presley sparked a city dialogue on sexual assault after she, during a Council hearing, shared details of the rape she previously survived when she was attending Boston University. While she had previously been public about surviving both childhood sexual abuse and sexual assault as an adult, during the hearing she shared details she had previously been private about. While Pressley received gratitude from other survivors of sexual abuse, some critics accused Pressley of leveraging the story of her personal experience with it for political gain.

In October 2011, Pressley and fellow Council member Tito Jackson sponsored a hearing investigating Massachusetts' anti-discrimination/public accommodation laws.

In June 2014, the Boston City Council unanimously passed an ordinance Pressley coauthored with Councilor Michelle Wu, which prohibits its city government "from contracting with any health insurer that denies coverage or 'discriminates in the amount of premium, policy fees, or rates charged...because of gender identity or expression". The ordinance was signed into law, and guarantees healthcare (including gender reassignment surgery, hormone therapy, and mental health services) to transgender city employees and dependents of city employees. Pressley declared, "We can't be a world-class city if anyone is made to feel like a second-class citizen."

== Youth and schools ==
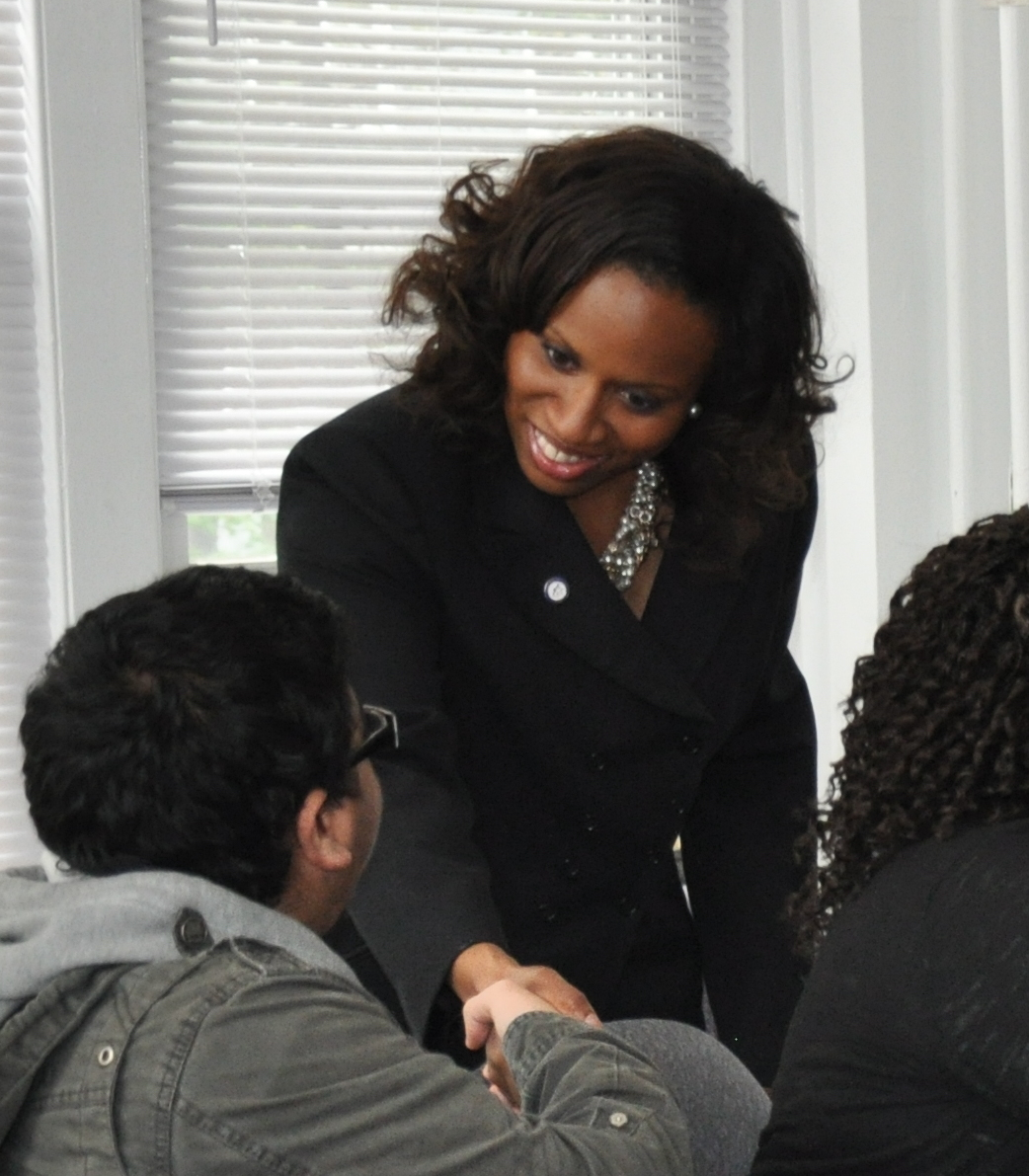
Pressley in 2011

Pressley worked collaboratively with community members to develop a comprehensive sex education and health curriculum which was implemented in Boston Public Schools. This work generated a level of controversy in the city.

In 2016, Pressley published an op-ed in the Dorchester Reporter advocating for the city to fund full-time nurses and social workers in every school in the Boston Public Schools. In July 2018, the council adopted a resolution authored by Pressley that expressed its support for the Parents' Bill of Rights that was created by Parenting Journey, a Somerville-based nonprofit.

Pressley voted along with the majority of City Councilors to support resolution to voice the council's opposition to 2016 Massachusetts Question 2, a ballot measure which would have authorized the expansion of the number of charter schools in the state. The resolution was adopted in an 11–2 vote. Pressley remarked that she believed the passage of the ballot measure would cause a "divestment" of funds from public schools that would result in a "tsunami of devastation".

=== Teen pregnancies and teen parenthood ===
A focus of Pressley's was decreasing the prevalence of teen pregnancies, as well as assisting teen parents in being able to complete their high school education. In their 2011 endorsement of Pressley for re-election, The Boston Globe praised this work.

On February 3, 2010, Pressley delivered her maiden speech to the council. Pressley focused her speech on a recent uptick in the city's teen pregnancy rate. The speech was incidentally delivered on her own birthday, and her mother surprised her by traveling to Boston and attending the meeting at which it was delivered.

Pressley was involved in revising and requiring the enforcement of policy for Boston Public Schools regarding pregnant and parenting students. She worked with the Massachusetts Alliance on Teen Pregnancy to author the district's new Expectant and Parenting Students Policy, which was adopted by the Boston School Committee on June 4, 2014. This was the first update by the district to this policy since 1987.

== Economic issues ==
In 2016 Pressley and Councilor Andrea Campbell introduced an ordinance that would have banned the use of credit scores to negatively assess job applicants and existing hires. Pressley also proposed an amendment to the Boston Living Wage Ordinance which would have increased the standard for what the city considers to be a "living wage" for those working in service and security jobs.

In 2017, the Council passed the Equity in City of Boston Contracts Ordinance, which was sponsored by Pressley and Councilor Michelle Wu. It required that the city create a supplier diversity program to conduct outreach to female and minority-owned businesses in regards to the city contracting process. It also required the city to actively solicit bids from at least one female-owned business and one minority-owned business for contracts under $50,000. It also created a quarterly reporting requirement for the city.

== Urban development ==
Pressley voiced criticism of what she felt was an excessive amount of luxury real estate development and lack of affordable housing in the city. In 2015, Pressley joined fellow at-large councilors Michelle Wu and Stephen J. Murphy in opposing the proposed Lewis Wharf hotel development. There were other occasions, however, where Pressley voted in favor of some luxury real estate developments in the city. For example, in 2017 Pressley voted in support of a measure that would facilitate the $1.3 billion Winthrop Center development. Pressley justified her vote by citing a pledge by the developers to involve minority-owned businesses. It was reported by Lee Fang and Zaid Jilani of The Intercept that records indicate that Pressley later received campaign contributions amounting to $1,250 from the project's developers.

== Public safety ==
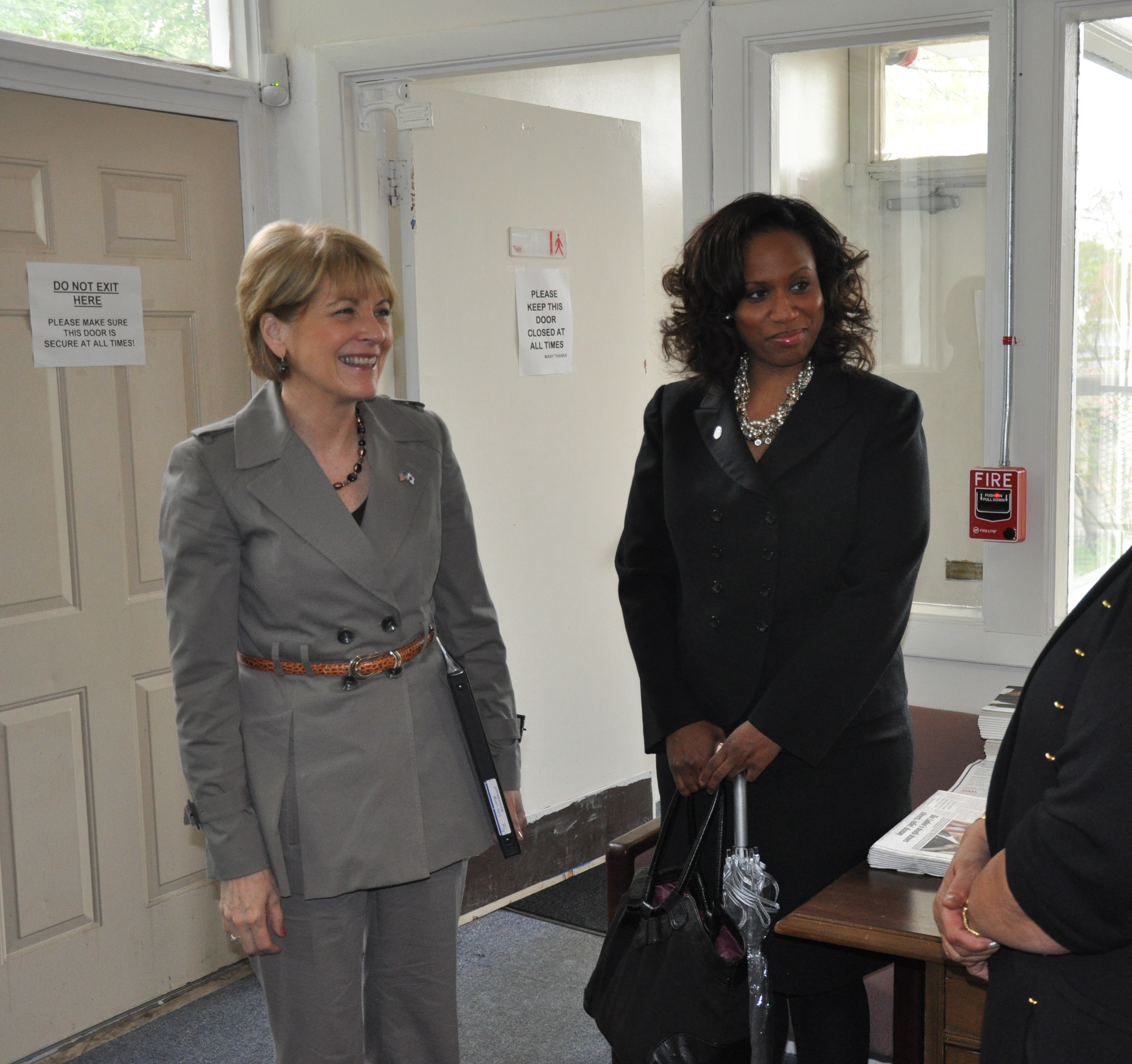
Pressley with Massachusetts Attorney General Martha Coakley in 2011

Pressley and fellow councilor Michelle Wu were credited as being the key figures that arranged for the Boston City Council to hold hearings on gun violence. Pressley organized the first listening-only hearing in the City Council's history, in which the councilors listened to remarks by 300 families that had been impacted by homicide.

After the Boston Marathon bombing terrorist attack in 2013, Pressley worked to connect those impacted with assistance.

Pressley led an effort to pass an ordinance requiring municipal trucks to have side guards to protect cyclists. She worked with Mayor Marty Walsh on an ordinance requiring it, which was passed unanimously by the City Council in November 2014.

== Liquor licenses ==
Pressley worked on the issue of liquor licenses in the city. For years, Pressley pushed for the passage of legislation that would remove control over the number of liquor licenses in Boston from the control of the state government of Massachusetts and place it under the purview of the Boston Licensing Board. The state held control over this since the Prohibition era. On December 18, 2013, the city council voted 12–1 to advance a home rule petition on this matter to the state.

While local control was not achieved, an ultimate product of Pressley's push was the passage of state legislation in 2014 granting Boston the authority to distribute an additional 75 liquor licenses over a three-year period, with the aim of distributing them to less advantaged neighborhoods in order to increase economic activity in those neighborhoods. However, The Boston Globe's Meghan Irons observed that an unintentional impact of this was that, "it created uneven competition. It left out certain neighborhoods. It allowed businesses that were already established to get the licenses." Nevertheless, in 2018, The New York Times called Pressley's work on the matter a "major accomplishment". To remedy the shortfalls, Pressley worked with Mayor Walsh with an aim to further expand the number of new available liquor licenses. In 2017, Pressley and Mayor Walsh unveiled a proposal to increase the number of liquor license in the city by 152 over a three year period, with the majority of licenses being granted to underserved communities. This proposal received the support of the editorial board of The Boston Globe.

In February 2015, Pressley was publicly skeptical of a proposed BYOB ordinance by Councilors Michelle Wu and Stephen J. Murphy to allow small restaurants without liquor licenses to permit patrons to bring their own bottles of wine or beer. Pressley expressed concern that such an ordinance could perpetuate the divide where liquor licenses remained only in more affluent neighborhoods. She also expressed concern for how such a policy would be regulated and whether it might lower the cost of meals, resulting in lower tips for waiters. She continued to express concern about the ordinance when it was debated in December of that year. Nevertheless, Pressley voted in support of the ordinance when it was adopted that month.

== Position on Boston's bid for the 2024 Olympics ==
Pressley was publicly skeptical of Boston's bid for the 2024 Summer Olympics. In March 2015, stating that she had a number of concerns and desired to see more detailed proposals, Pressley described herself as undecided on whether to support the bid effort but still conditionally willing to. That month she had filed a request for the City Council to hold two special hearings: one to "analyze the diversity and inclusion plan from bidding process through the potential games," and another to "discuss comprehensive approaches to reduce sex trafficking around mega sporting events such as the Olympics." After the abandonment of Boston's bid for the Olympics, the organization No Boston Olympics (which had opposed the bid) endorsed Pressley and three other incumbent Boston City Council members for reelection, praising them for "Demonstrat[ing] leadership by asking tough questions" to the leaders behind Boston's Olympic bid.

== Other politics ==
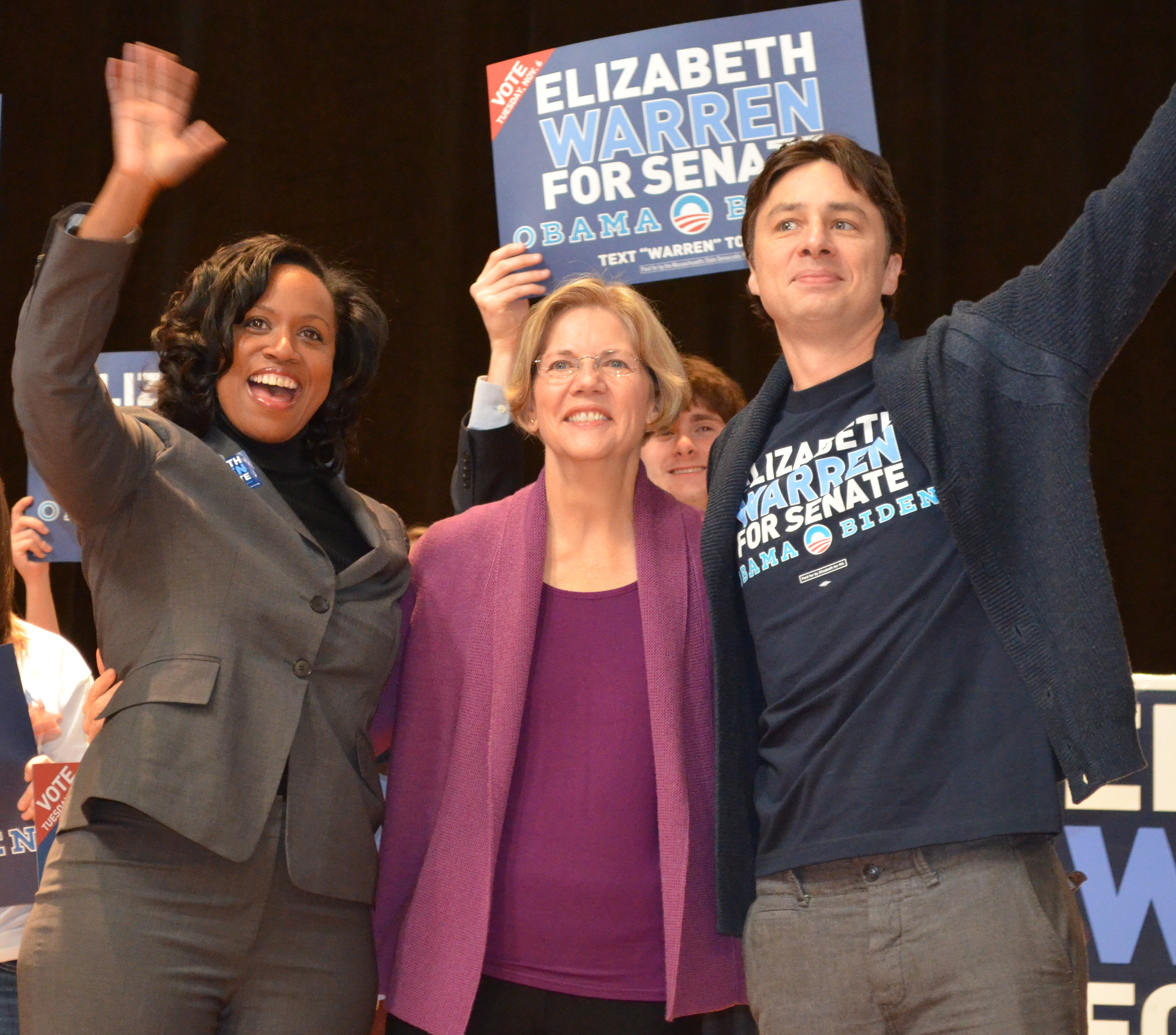
Pressley (left) and actor Zach Braff (right) stand with U.S. Senate nominee Elizabeth Warren at a rally at Northeastern University for Warren's 2012 campaign

Pressley was one of the first notable Massachusetts politicians to endorse Elizabeth Warren's successful campaign in Massachusetts' 2012 U.S. Senate election. Ahead of the Democratic primary for the 2013 United States Senate special election in Massachusetts, Pressley endorsed the candidacy of Ed Markey. During the 2016 Democratic Party presidential primaries, Pressley endorsed the candidacy of Hillary Clinton.

== Election to congress and departure from the City Council ==
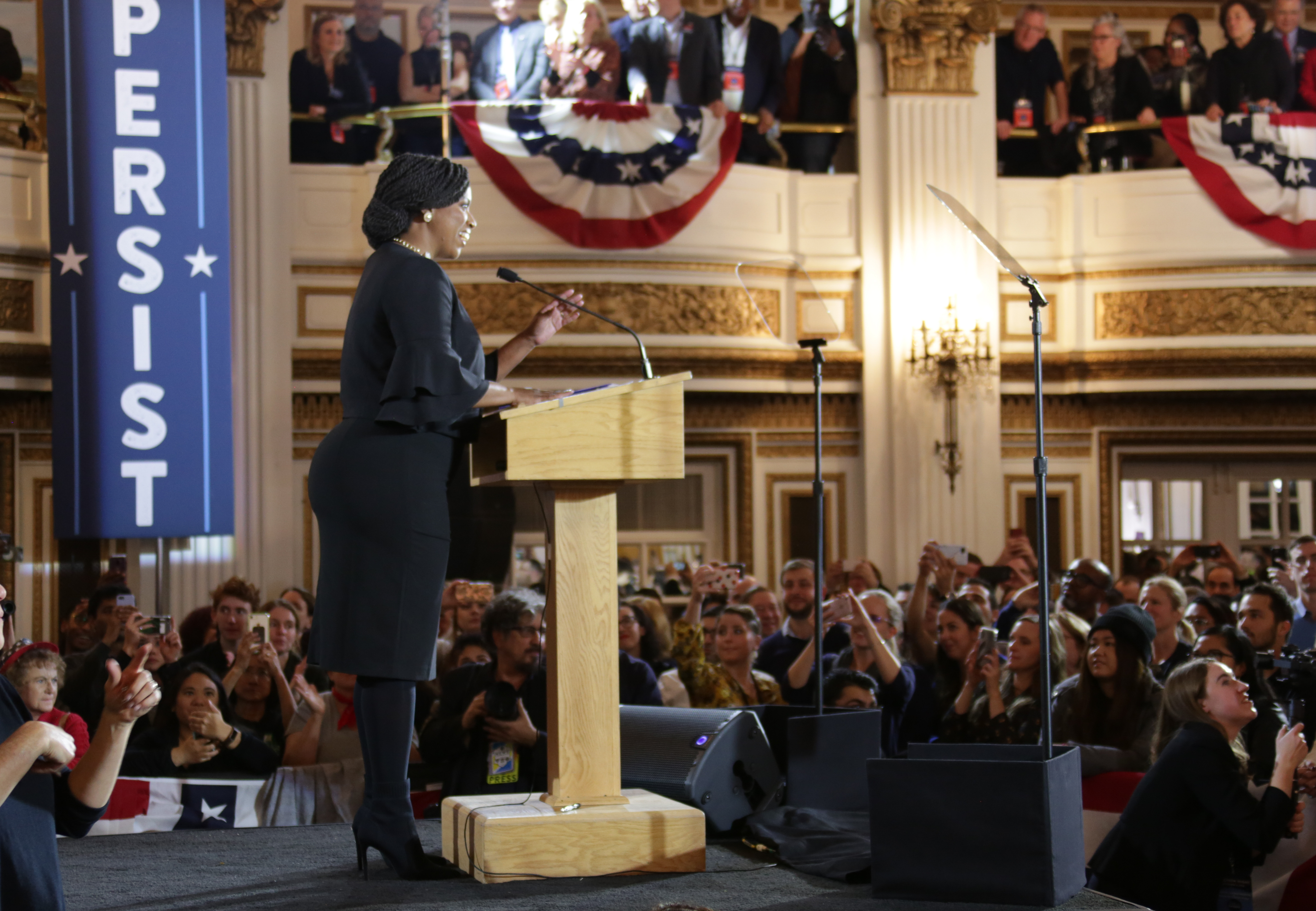
Pressley delivering her November 2018 election night victory remarks

In 2018, Pressley was elected to the United States House of Representatives after having first defeated incumbent Michael Capuano in a Democratic Party primary election. For years Pressley had been speculated as a likely top-contender to succeed Capuano if he were to retire. Rather than wait for him to step aside, Pressley decided to challenge him. Pressley was the first sitting council member to be elected to another office since Francis Roache was elected Suffolk County register of deeds in 2002.

After being elected to the United States House of Representatives, Pressley delivered a farewell speech to the City Council on December 5, 2018. In her speech, Pressley declared that her priorities as a congresswoman would include gun violence reduction, reforming federal laws on cannabis, and passing Medicare for all. During the same meeting, Councilor Wu offered her praise of Pressley, remarking, "You’ve changed the course of history in the city of Boston. I would not be sitting in this seat without your courage and your conviction throughout your entire career." In the audience for Pressley's farewell were two fellow congresswomen-elect that, with Pressley, were members of "The Squad": Alexandria Ocasio-Cortez and Rashida Tlaib.

Boston city law requires that vacancies for the at-large council seats are filled by the next-placed candidate in the previous election, which had been Althea Garrison in the November 2017 election. Thus, when Pressley departed from the city council, she was succeeded by Garrison.

== See also ==
- Politics of Boston
- Boston City Council tenure of Michelle Wu
