= Mayoralty of Michelle Wu =

Mayoralty in Boston, US since 2021

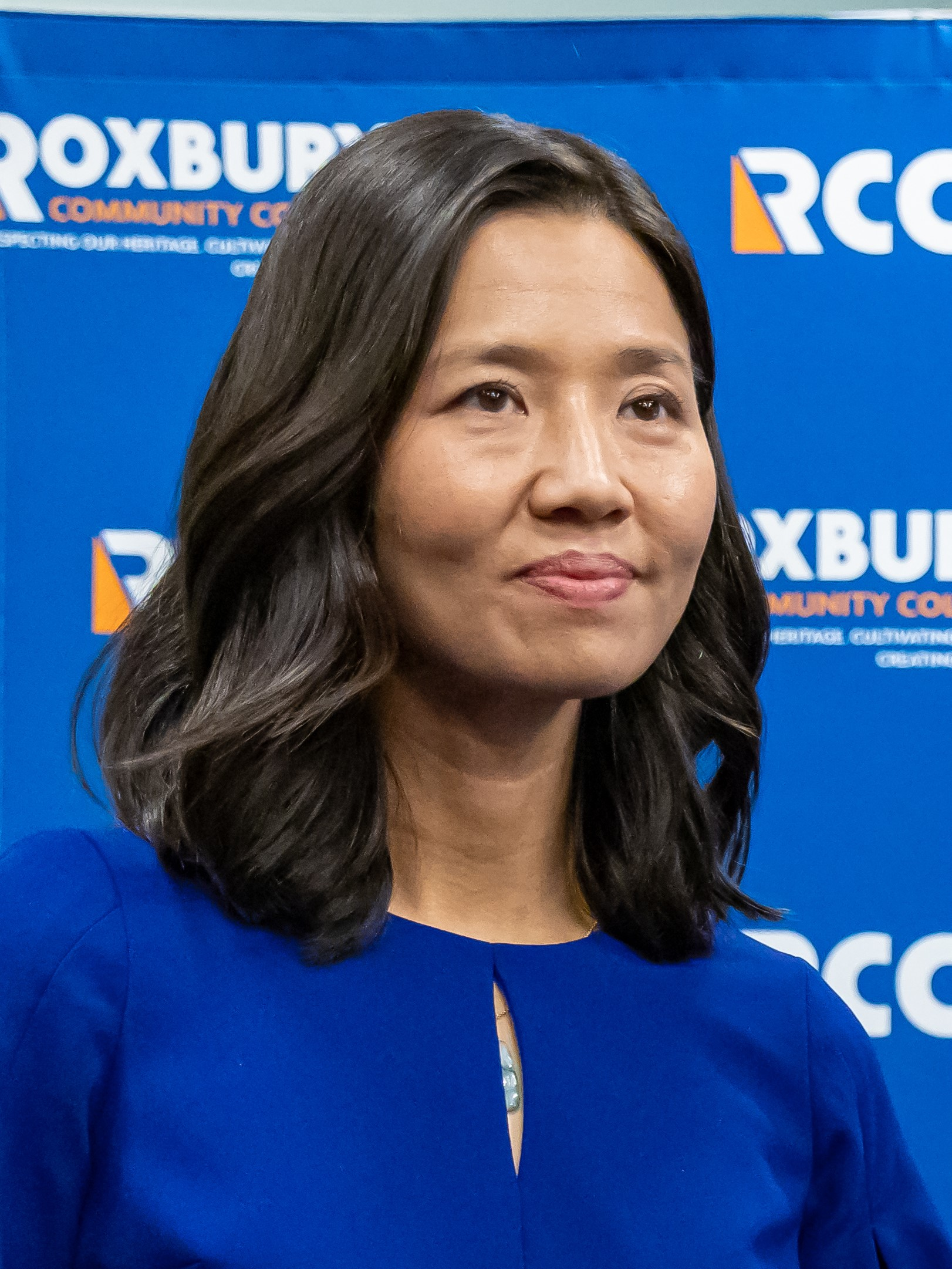
- Wu in 2024
- Mayoralty of Michelle Wu; November 16, 2021 – present
- Mayor: Michelle Wu
- Party: Democratic
- Election: 2021, 2025

Michelle Wu has served as mayor of Boston since November 2021. Wu was elected mayor in 2021, winning with 64% of the vote, becoming the first woman, first person of color, and first Asian American elected to serve as the mayor of Boston. At 36 years of age, was also one of the youngest individuals elected to the office. (Note: John E. Kerrigan became mayor in 1945 at 36 years of age.) Wu is a member of the Democratic Party. Prior to being sworn in as mayor, Wu served as a member of the Boston City Council.

An advocate for a municipal "Green New Deal" (the Boston Green New Deal), as mayor Wu signed an ordinance to divest city investments from companies that derive more than 15 percent of their revenue from fossil fuels, tobacco products, or prison facilities. She also has announced plans for the city to spend $2 billion on school construction projects as part of a "Green New Deal" for the city's public schools. As mayor, she has also taken actions related to increasing affordable housing in the city and took actions related to address city's COVID-19 pandemic. A supporter of fare-free public transportation, Wu has funded a two-year period of fare-free service on three MBTA bus routes, expanding on a single-route pilot program that had previously been started under Kim Janey's preceding acting mayoralty. Wu signed an executive order which outlined the formula for what funds developers building in the city's downtown must contribute to fund child care services in the city, building upon a decades-old policy that had previously lacked needed specificity. Wu also reached a contract agreement with the Boston Police Patrolmen's Association that secured the union's agreement to significant reforms within the Boston Police Department. Wu's administration also has implemented initiatives to decrease crime in the city. In her first term, the city twice set record lows for its annual homicide rates. In late-2024, United States Conference of Mayors described Boston as "the safest big city in America" and "a model of urban safety" and the Vera Institute of Justice agreed with a description of Boston as "one of the safest major cities" in the United States.

During her 2025 campaign for re-election, her challenger Josh Kraft's campaign spent record amounts of money against her in advance of the non-partisan preliminary (primary election). However, Wu won more than 71 percent of the vote in the preliminary (a 49-point lead over Kraft), which motivated Kraft to withdraw his name from the general election ballot leaving Wu unopposed on the November 2025 general election ballot. Without an opponent listed on the general election ballot, Wu won the general election with more than 93% of votes cast (the remainder going to write-ins).

== 2021 election ==
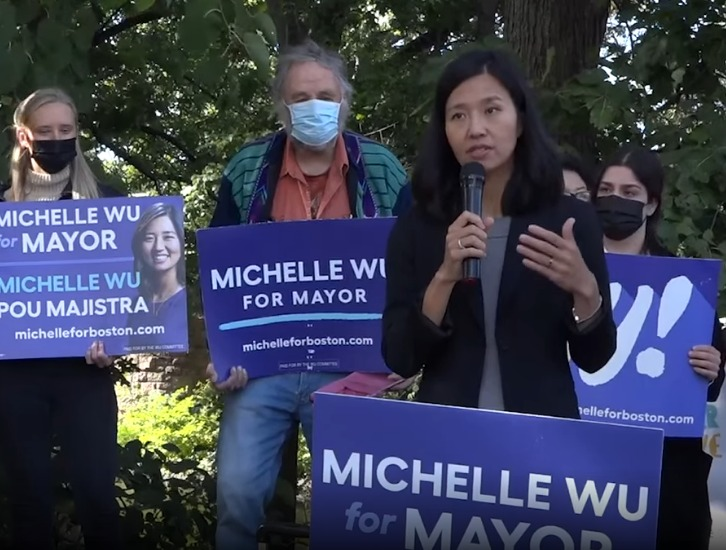
Wu campaigning for mayor in September 2021

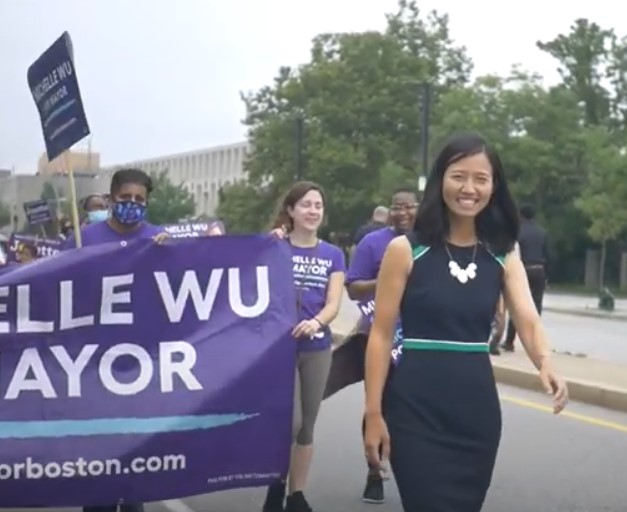
Wu participating in the 2021 Roxbury Unity Parade

Wu was elected mayor in 2021. Her election made her the first woman, first person of color, and first Asian American elected to serve as the mayor of Boston. At 36 years of age, was also one of the youngest individuals elected to the office. Wu is a member of the Democratic Party.

Wu's victory was seen as a part of a moment of growth for political representation of Asian Americans. The same day as her election, two other Asian American individuals won elections in major American cities: Aftab Pureval in Cincinnati and Bruce Harrell in Seattle. Prior to their elections, there had only been six incumbent Asian American mayors in any of the 100 largest cities in the United States, and none of them were from cities outside of the states of California or Texas. Before Wu's election, very few Asian American women had ever served as major city mayor, and there were few Asian women serving in other significant elected executive offices.

=== Primary election ===
Wu had long been viewed a future mayoral prospect, fielding questions about whether she'd consider one day running as far back as 2016. Since at least 2019, Wu was viewed as a potential challenger to incumbent mayor Marty Walsh, if Walsh sought reelection in 2021. In September 2020, Walsh told The Boston Globe that Wu had told him of her intent to run in 2021. Later that month, Wu announced her candidacy, declaring that she was running a "people-powered campaign to bring new leadership to Boston's executive office". She was regarded to be challenging Walsh from the political left.

Walsh was designated by President-elect Joe Biden to be his nominee for Secretary of Labor on January 7, 2021, leaving the mayor's race an open seat. Senator Elizabeth Warren endorsed Wu for mayor two days later.

In April, an analysis by The Boston Globe found that, of the six major candidates then-running, Wu had received the least financial contributions from real estate developers. Andrew Martinez of Bisnow related this to Wu's plans to abolish the Boston Planning & Development Agency.

Wu's primary election campaign was seen as possibly being boosted by a collection of young internet activists who had vigorously supported her campaign, referred to as the "Markeyverse" due to their support for Senator Ed Markey in his successful re-election campaign the previous year. She was endorsed by a number of progressive groups, including #VOTEPROCHOICE

By September 2021, Wu was widely considered to be the front-runner in the nonpartisan primary election, with a significant polling lead. Her campaign emphasized "wonkery" (policy details), in a manner resembling Wu's mentor Elizabeth Warren.

=== General election ===
Wu placed first in the nonpartisan primary and advanced to the general election, where she faced fellow city council member Annissa Essaibi George. On September 25, Acting Mayor Kim Janey, who placed fourth in the nonpartisan primary, endorsed Wu for the general election.

Wu was viewed as the front-runner in the general election campaign, with advantages in endorsements, including from cultural groups, Congresswoman Ayanna Pressley, both of Massachusetts' U.S. Senators (Ed Markey and Elizabeth Warren), and the editorial board of The Boston Globe. Ellen Barry of The New York Times characterized Wu as having benefited as a candidate from her years of engagement with the city's residents as a city councilor. She opined that Wu's work while on the City Council had introduced her to many of the city's voters and that Wu was, "difficult to caricature as a radical."

On November 2, 2021, Wu won the election with over 64% of the vote, becoming the first woman and first person of color to become mayor of Boston. Wu won sizable margins among various demographic groups, leading her victory to be characterized as one with a multiethnic coalition. Being 36 years of age, Wu was the youngest person elected mayor of Boston in almost a century. Wu was sworn in on November 16, 2021.

=== Platform and campaign positions ===
In both the primary and general elections, Wu ran on a progressive-oriented agenda. Wu's mayoral platform included her previously outlined proposals for a municipal Green New Deal, fare-free public transit, abolishing the Boston Planning & Development Agency, implementing a food justice agenda, and her previously declared support to reinstate rent stabilization. In her campaign, Wu also supported restructuring the Boston School Committee (which is currently all-appointed since mayoral control of schools was adopted in Boston in the 1990s) to be majority-elected. Wu also called for the creation of the Teacher Advisory Board, and the empowerment of the Boston Student Advisory Committee. Wu proposed implementing universal preschool and universal child care for Boston children under five years of age, and for the creation of a city office to coordinate early childhood education. Wu's police reform plan reiterated her earlier calls for the diversion of nonviolent 9-1-1 calls away from police and instead to alternative response teams such as mental health clinicians, social workers, and community outreach workers. After a king tide caused Morrissey Boulevard to become flooded in November 2020, Wu reiterated support for a municipal Green New Deal and for accelerating city government timelines for carbon neutrality and exclusive renewable energy usage in the city at a meeting with activists along the thoroughfare.

== 2025 election ==
results of 2025 mayoral preliminary, by ward Wu—80–90% Wu—70–80% Wu—60–70% Wu—50–60% Wu—40–50%

In the 2025 Boston mayoral election, challenger Josh Kraft's campaign against Wu vastly outspent her campaign. Kraft spent record amounts for a Boston preliminary election. However, in the September 9 preliminary election Wu received more than 71% of the vote, having a 49–point lead over Kraft that was described by The Boston Globe as "staggering" and the Dorchester Reporter as a "blowout". Two days after the preliminary, Kraft ended his candidacy. With Kraft filing to have his name removed from the ballot, and with no other candidate receiving the sufficient number of votes to qualify to replace him, Wu was unopposed on the November general election ballot.

== Transition into office ==
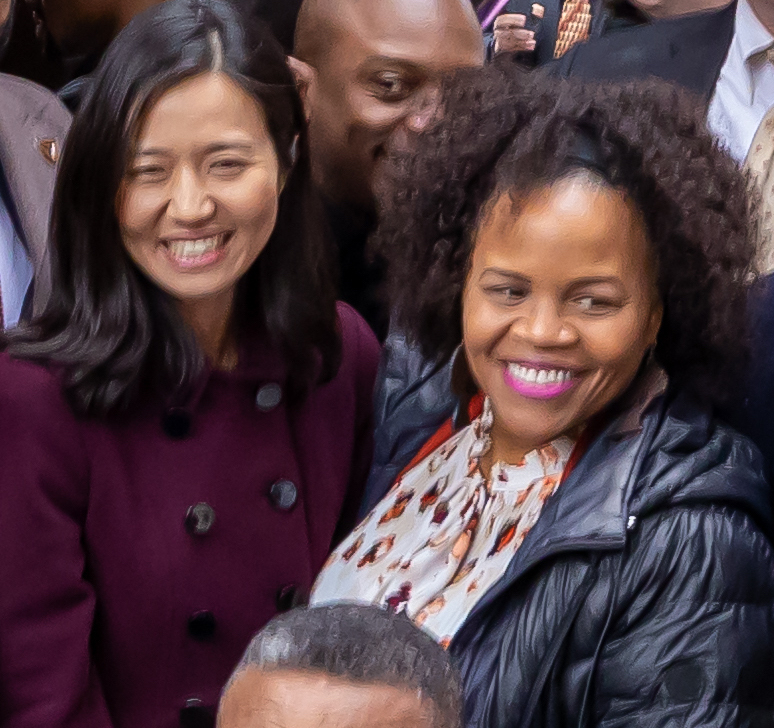
Wu (left) and her acting predecessor, Kim Janey, in January 2023

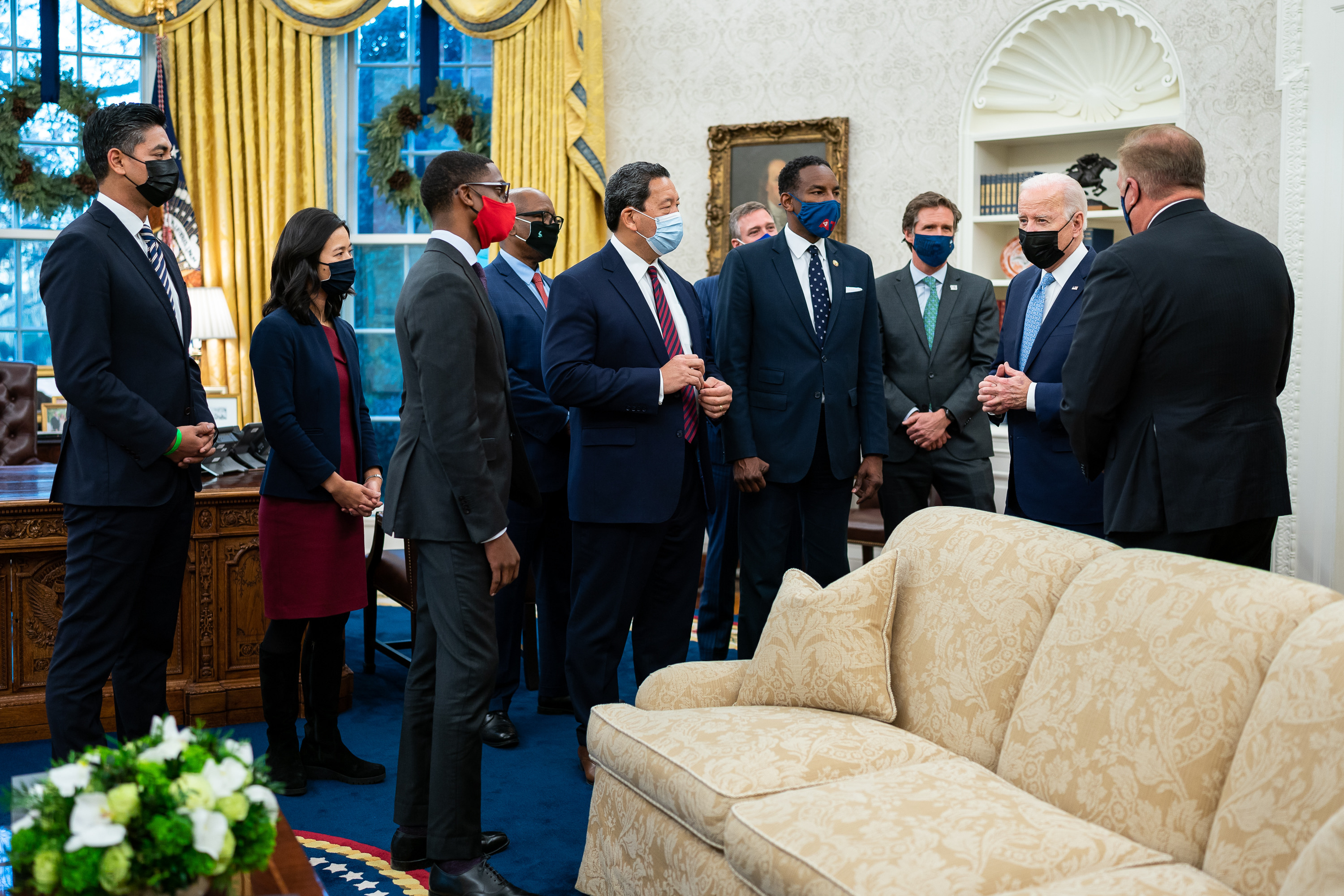
Wu (second from left) and other newly elected mayors and mayors-elect meet with President Joe Biden (second from right) in the Oval Office of the White House on December 14, 2021

Wu had a shorter transition into office than most mayors of Boston due to the fact that there was no permanent incumbent mayor at the time of the election. Under Boston's city charter, in such circumstances new mayors are sworn in as soon as is conveniently possible after the results of the election are certified. Before the election, on September 24, candidates Wu and Essaibi George had met with Acting Mayor Janey at the Parkman House and mutually agreed on November 16 date as a tentative date for a transition of power for the mayoralty. Wu would ultimately take office as mayor on that planned date. This meant that she had only a two-week period between her election and assumption of office.

After Wu won election, she named Acting Mayor Janey as honorary chair of her mayoral transition team. The co-chairs of the transition were former state representative and city housing chief Charlotte Golar Richie; former Massachusetts secretary of administration and finance (and 2018 Democratic gubernatorial nominee) Jay Gonzalez; and activist Mimi Ramos. Among the transition's numerous advisors was Julian Agyeman.

With Wu vacating her City Council seat before the end of her term in order to assume the mayoralty, by Boston City Charter, the opportunity to serve the remainder of the term Wu had been elected to in 2017 was to be offered to the first runner-up of the 2017 election. In this instance, that was Alejandra St. Guillen. Initially planning to accept the opportunity to serve the remainder of Wu's term, due to ethics concerns about matters such as St. Guillen also holding on the city's cannabis board, St. Guillen ultimately declined to accept the position. Thereafter, per the Boston City Charter, the remainder of Wu's term was offered to Erin Murphy, who was the second runner-up in the 2017 election. Murphy accepted the opportunity. Murphy had recently won election to a full term in the 2019 at-large city council election, and thus would only be starting her tenure on the City Council earlier by accepting. Murphy was sworn in by Mayor Wu on December 1, 2021.

== Relationship with the Boston City Council ==
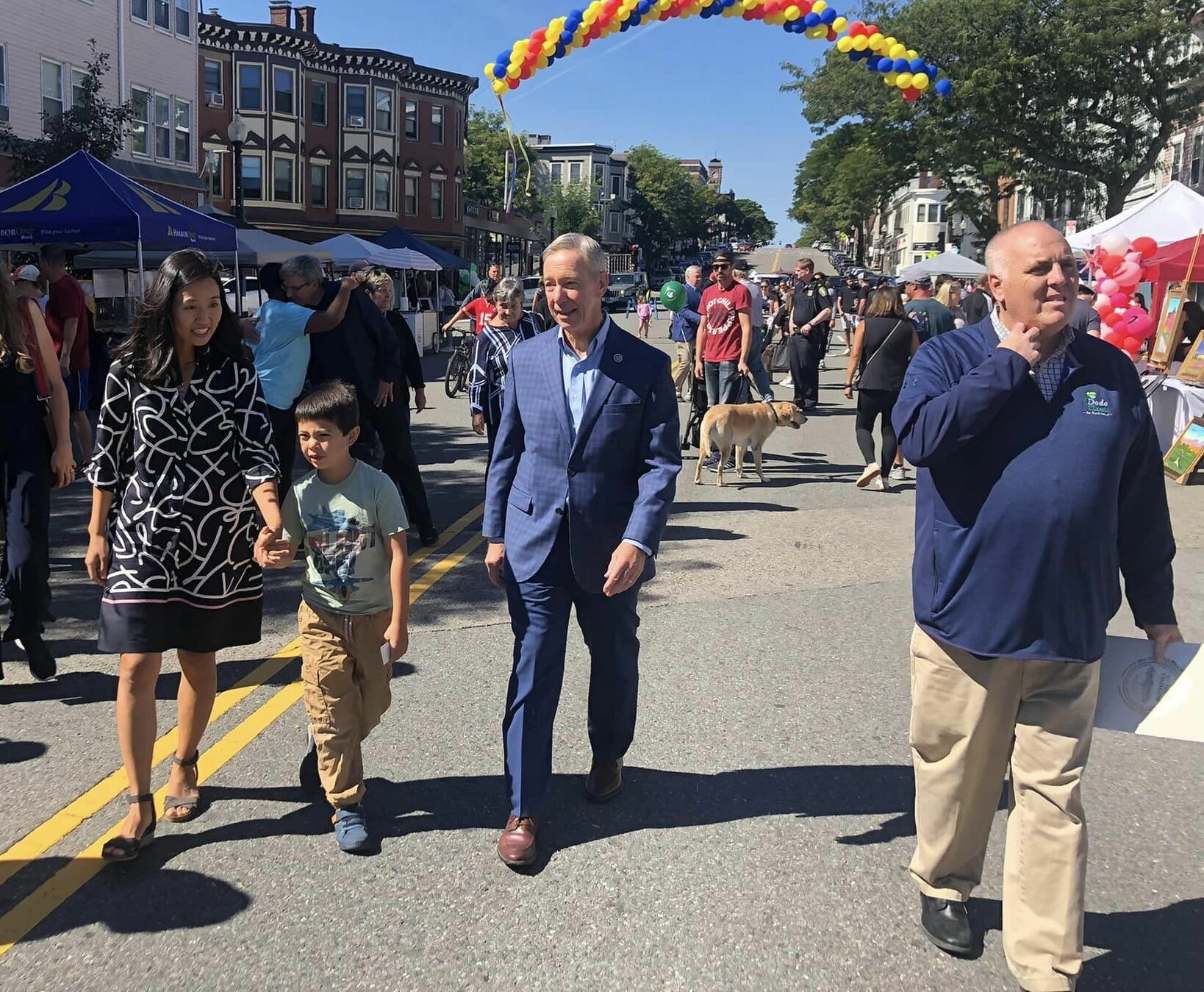
Wu (left) in September 2022 at Boston's 22nd Annual Street Festival with Congressman Stephen Lynch (center) and City Council President Ed Flynn (right)

Since the membership of the City Council that took office early into Wu's mayoralty also leans progressive, there have been many matters that, as mayor, Wu has been able to agreeably partner with the City Council on. In addition to this, she has generally prevailed in the instances where she and the City Council have been at odds. Her ability to win out over the City Council when they are in disagreement has come despite the fact that there were some expectations when Wu took office that the city government's balance of power would tilt less towards the office of the mayor than it had for previous mayors. This expectation had been created by the fact that the City Council elected in 2019 was to be legally more powerful than previous City Councils, being granted much greater power over the city budget by a recently adopted ordinance, as well as the fact that its membership held diverse viewpoints and had many freshman members who were devoid of existing loyalties to other politicians. Emma Platoff of The Boston Globe has credited Wu's ability to frequently prevail on matters that she and the City Council are not aligned on to Wu's own "political savvy", the strong legal power afforded to mayors of Boston, internal divisions on the City Council that give the body a weaker negotiating position, and the inexperience of new council members.

The 2023 Boston City Council election was seen as a test of Wu's political influence in the city, with her endorsing four candidates. The election was also seen as having genuine potential to shift the council's ideological balance, with there being a possibility of a less-progressive council being elected. Instead, progressives saw a strong result and retained their supermajority. In what was seen as a major political victory for Wu, all four of her endorsed candidates won their races. Three of these four candidates are regarded to be acolytes of Wu due to their past experiences working under her. Additionally, the election saw two of Wu's strongest critics on the council unseated from their district seats due in large part to personal controversies each suffered. One of the four successful candidates that Wu had endorsed has run as a challenger to one of these critics. The result of the 2023 city council election has been regarded as creating a city council that is more friendly to Wu's agenda in the second half of her first term.

== Environment and climate change ==
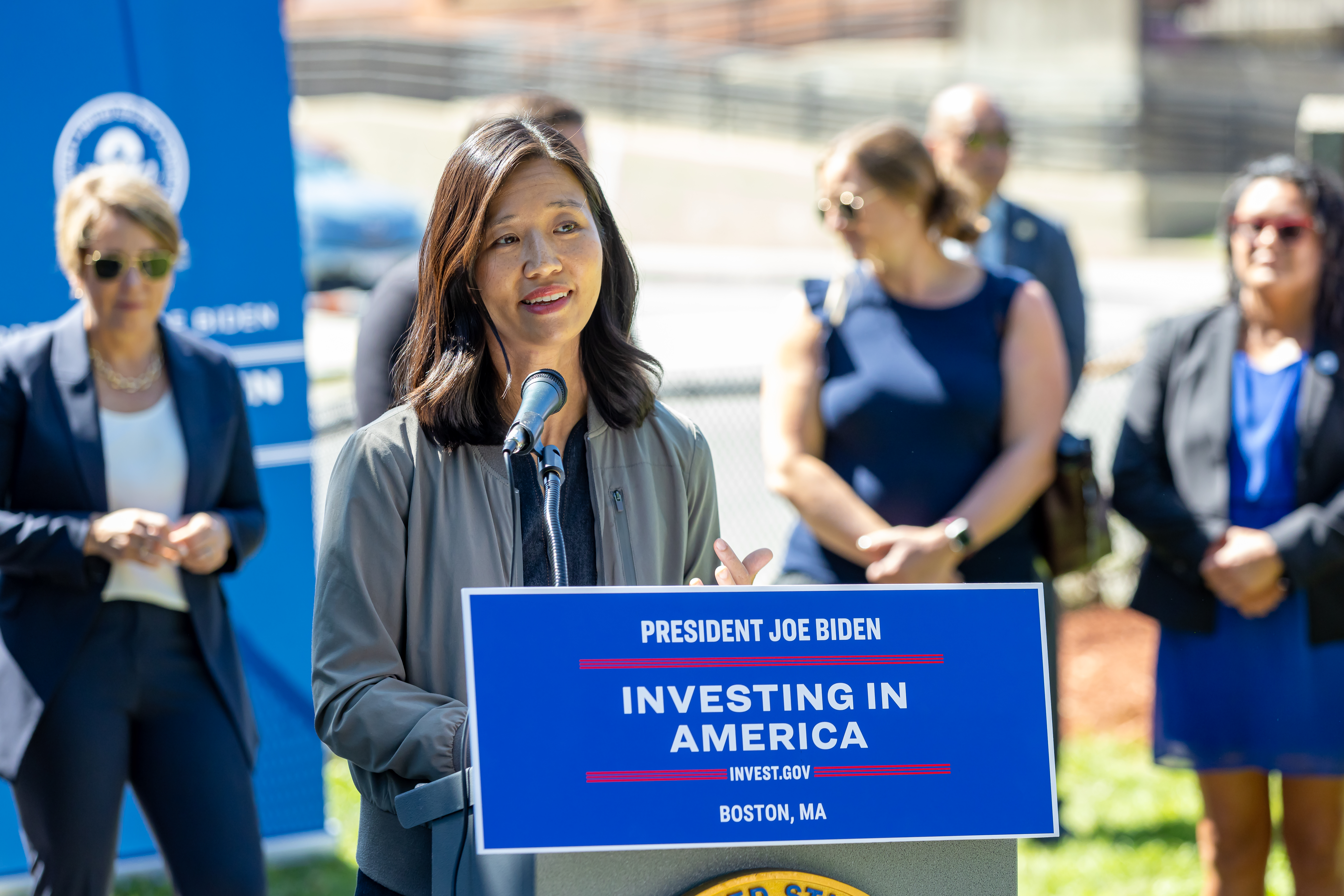
Wu at an August 2023 event promoting local projects being funded with support from the Environmental Protection Agency's new $27 Greenhouse Gas Reduction Fund

On November 22, 2021, Wu signed an ordinance to divest city investments from companies that derive more than 15 percent of their revenue from fossil fuels, tobacco products, or prison facilities. This is seen as being part of her pursuit of a municipal Green New Deal for Boston. The process will entail the divestment of $65 million in city assets. The new rules do not apply to Boston's employee pension fund, which is governed by state law. While a member of the city council, she had fought for the adoption of such a policy.

On May 16, 2022, Wu pledged that the city would carry out a "Green New Deal" for Boston Public Schools (BPS) school buildings, which will see renovation of existing facilities and the construction new ones. This plan expands the funding the city is to invest in school construction from the $1 billion outlined in Marty Walsh's 2015 BuildBPS plan to $2 billion.

In April 2022, on Earth Day, as part of the city's Climate Ready Boston efforts, Wu unveiled the Heat Resilience for Boston plan. This plan centers on combatting the impacts of rising heat extremes, focusing on the "environmental justice communities" of Chinatown, Dorchester, East Boston, Mattapan, and Roxbury. Wu also announced the creation of the Boston Extreme Temperatures Response Task Force to coordinate efforts across the city related to handling heat extremes. As part of a $20 million housing program funded through COVID recovery funds, Wu's mayoral administration announced plans in 2023 planning to launch the "Large Building Green Energy Retrofits Program" providing building owners of buildings with fifteen or more units up to $10,000 to support efforts to reduce their buildings' energy use through "deep energy retrofits" of the city's existing housing stock.

== COVID-19 pandemic ==
Wu took office amid the COVID-19 pandemic. In December 2021, Wu announced a city COVID-19 vaccine mandate. Under the mandate, people ages 12 and older, in order to enter indoor public venues (bars, restaurants, gyms, theaters, and sports venues) in Boston, would be required to show proof of at least their first COVID-19 vaccine dose by January 15, 2022, and of full vaccination by February 15, 2022. The mandate promoted opposition, and in an interview with Boston Public Radio, Wu stated that she received racist messages in response to vaccine requirements. Some opponents circulated false rumors about Wu being hospitalized for panic attacks while in office. On February 19, 2022, Wu announced that the city would end its proof-of-vaccine mandate for public places with immediate effect.

The Wu administration also required city employees to be vaccinated against COVID-19 (with exceptions for employees with medical reasons and religious objectors), and about 94% of city employees were in compliance with that requirement by late January 2022. Wu extended the deadline for city employees to comply. Some public employee unions fought the mandate in court, arguing that the mandate rules should be subject to collective bargaining. A Massachusetts Appeals Court judge sided with the unions, blocking the city worker mandate. Wu faced persistent demonstrations outside of her house protesting her COVID measures.

== Housing and development ==
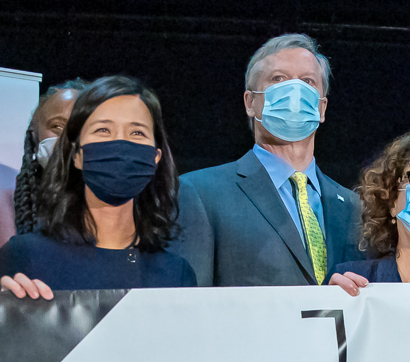
Wu with Governor Charlie Baker at the December 2021 ground-breaking of an affordable housing development

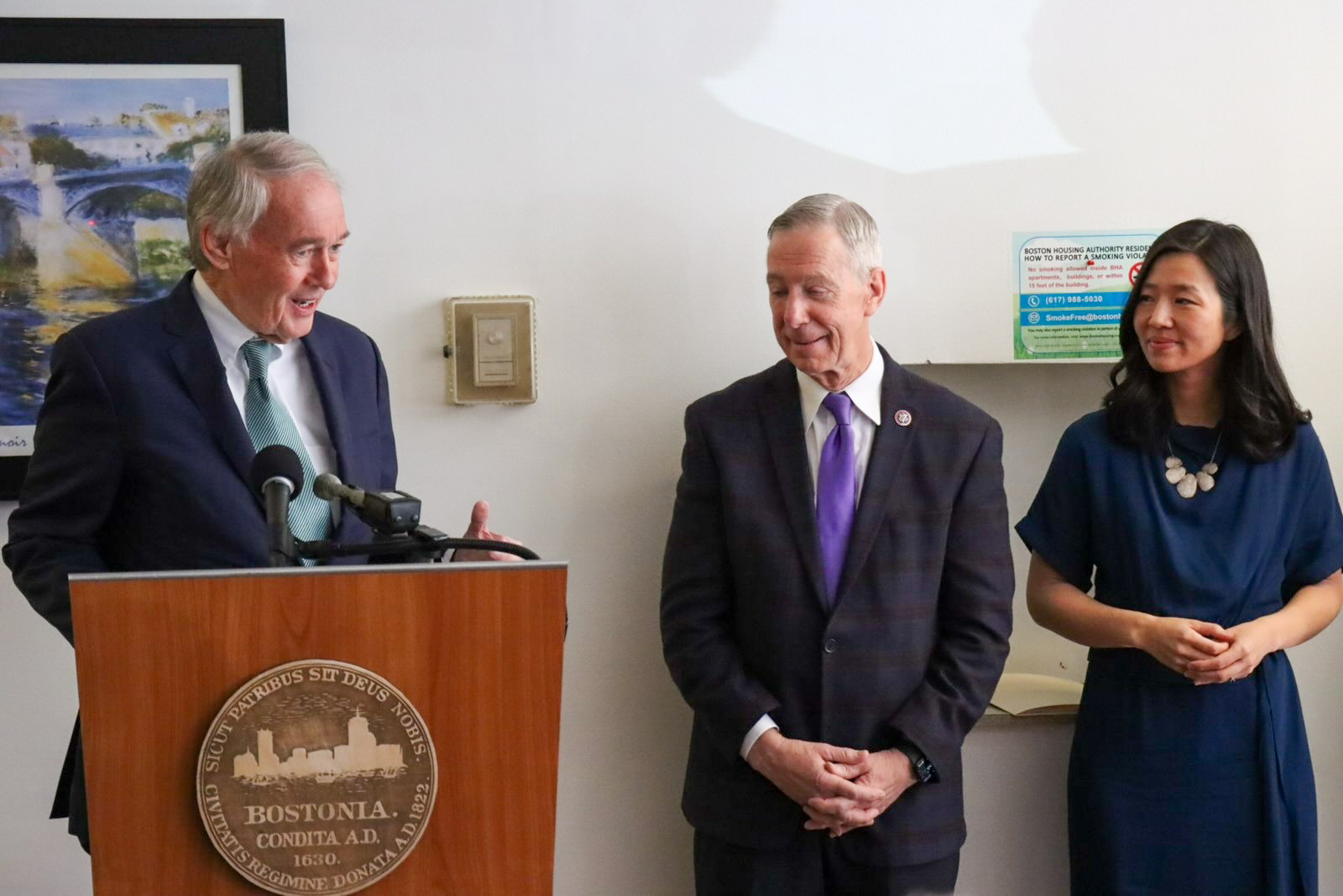
Wu (right) joins Senator Ed Markey (left) and Congressman Stephen Lynch at the March 2023 announcement of federal funding to make Ausonia Apartments more energy-efficient and climate-resilient

Wu has placed great importance on housing matters, declaring in her 2024 State of the City address that she believes, "everything starts with housing." A major issue in Boston predating her mayoralty is housing affordability and a shortage of housing supply. As of 2024, Boston had the third-highest rental rates among United States cities, as well as a rental vacancy rate of only one-percent. Wu sees addressing these matters as also important to reversing the city's trend of population loss. E. Tammy Kim of The New Yorker wrote of Wu's approaching to addressing the city's challenging with housing,

Her approach has been to try everything, all at once: preserving and building new public housing; imposing rent control; requiring twenty per cent of new apartments to be somewhat affordable; simplifying the process for accessory dwelling units; converting unused offices into apartments; and providing shelter for people coming off the streets

Wu has given far less one-on one meetings to private developers than her predecessors did, giving them less opportunities to directly lobby her on policies. The lack of special access granted to them by Wu has irked many developers.

In her early months as mayor, Wu moved hundreds of unhoused individuals that had been living in the Mass and Cass area to temporary housing. In January 2022, Wu designated $50 million to fund improvements to the Mildred C. Hailey Apartments complex in the Jamaica Plain neighborhood.

In September 2022, when Wu had an opportunity to nominate ten individuals to serve on the Boston Zoning Board of Appeal, she nominated only three Walsh appointees for reappointment. Her nominees were noted to be diverse. Some of the nominees included first generation immigrants, income-restricted renters, and building trades members.

In December 2021, Wu signed into law an ordinance amending the city's zoning code by eliminating off-street parking minimums for new affordable developments where 60% of the units are income-restricted at 100% the area median income in order to remove a barrier for the construction of new units of affordable housing. In October 2022, Wu signed an executive order that changed the approval process in the city for new income-restricted affordable housing developments. The order sought to halve the time that the approval process takes. Impacting nine city agencies (including the BPDA), the order established a separate review and approval process for affordable housing developments and requested the BPDA give priority to such developments.

In October 2022, the city of Boston provided $12 million in funding to assist in the acquisition of thirty-six apartment buildings in East Boston by the East Boston Neighborhood Trust, a new organization that is the first mixed-income neighborhood trust (MINT) in the state of Massachusetts. The trust is managed by the East Boston Community Development Corporation, a neighborhood organization. The acquisition of these buildings by the new trust, in consort with a municipal deed restriction, will ensure that the 114 housing units in these buildings permanently remain affordable. The city's funding to this came from $9 million received from the American Rescue Plan Act, $2 million received in the CARES Act, and $1 million in inclusionary development funds.

Utilizing $20 million in COVID-19 recovery funding, Wu's mayoral administration is implementing a housing program that includes an initiative to establish affordable housing in three-deckers and the "Large Building Green Energy Retrofits Program" to provide funding to assist owners of buildings with fifteen or more housing units to reduce their buildings' energy use through "deep energy retrofits".

Wu has worked with the state government to seek federal funding to realign the Massachusetts Turnpike's route through the Beacon Park Yard. The realignment would enable plans by Harvard University to build development above the railroad tracks and realigned turnpike. It would also help to bridge a community divide created in the 1960s by the construction of the viaduct on which the highway currently runs.

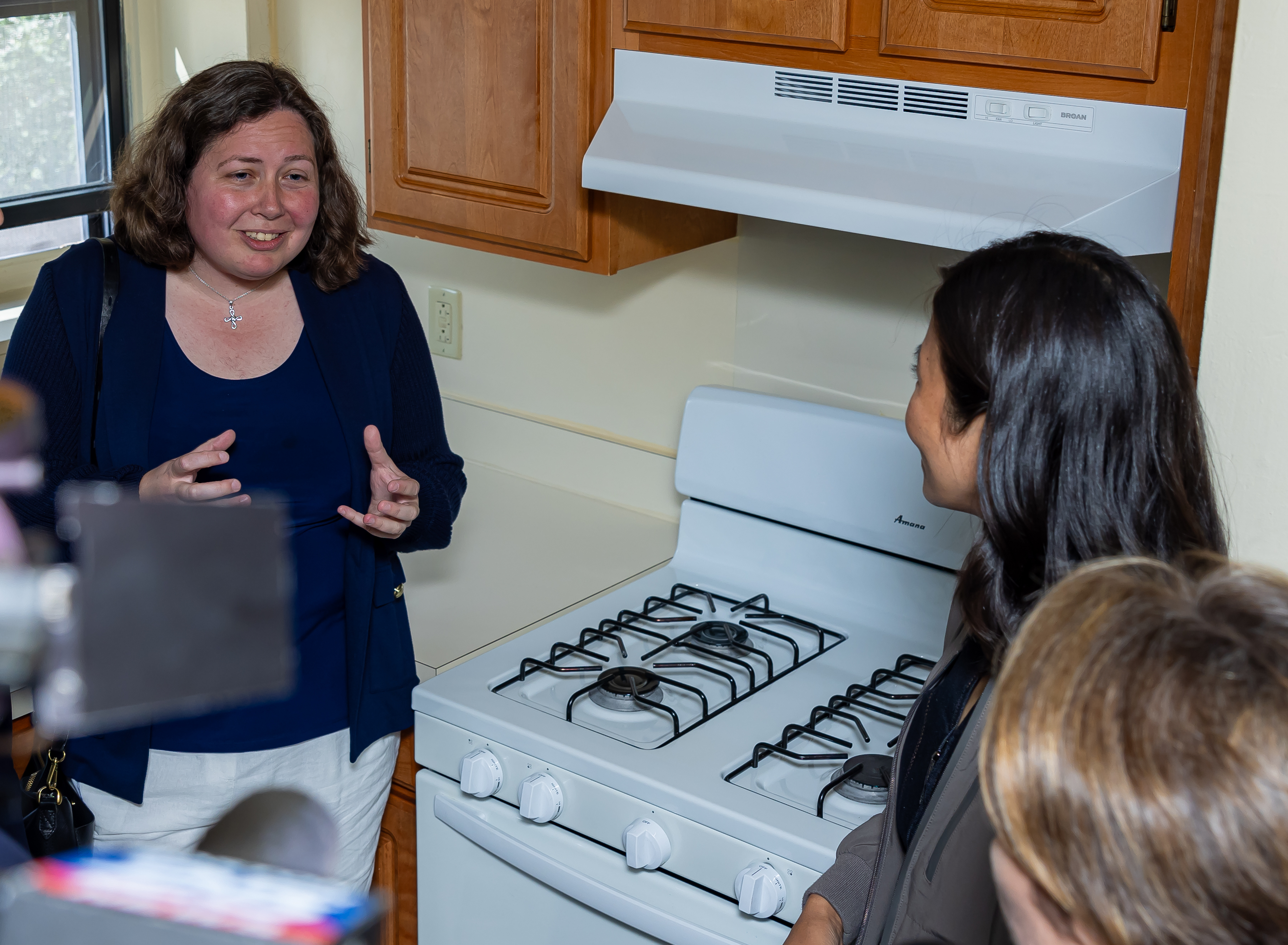
Wu listens to Boston Housing Authority head Kenzie Bok (left) during an August 2023 visit to a housing complex in the Dorchester neighborhood

In 2023, Wu appointed Kenzie Bok to head the Boston Housing Authority.

In response to high office space vacancy (due to increased remote work after the COVID-19 pandemic) and demand for new housing, in June 2023 Wu announced a new program to offer property tax discounts as high as 75% to landlords that convert empty office space to residential use. The program was officially launched in October 2023, and expanded further in June 2024 to incorporate an additional $15 million in funds from the state government. In September 2025, residential tenants began moving into units in the first project completed under this program.

In September 2023, Wu announced that her administration would begin the process of creating the first overhaul in six decades to the city's zoning code. A report by Cornell University professor Sara Bronin that had been commissioned by the city had argued a need for code to be overhauled.

Wu has advocated for the state to grant legislative approval for the city to place a real estate transfer tax on transfers of property valued at $2 million or more.

Wu has supported a project which would renovate White Stadium in order to host a new team in the National Women's Soccer League.

=== Rent control ===
In March 2022, Wu announced the creation of a Rent Stabilization Advisory Committee, which will report the city's Office of Housing on Strategies with advice on means to stabilize rents in the city and to combat the displacement of tenants, with the aim of creating a proposal to present to the City Council.

On March 8, 2023, in a 11–2 vote the Boston City Council consented to two home rule petitions proposed by Wu: one asking the state government to permit the city implement a form of rent control, and the other asking the state to permit Boston to implement Wu's plan to restructure the Boston Planning & Development Agency. The two petitions will need to be approved by the state government in order for Boston to be granted these permissions. Her proposal was criticized by both the real estate community (which in general opposes any form of rent control), as well as by some rent control advocates who regard it as not going far enough. The Boston Real Estate Board launched a campaign in 2023 to oppose her measure, saying it will discourage housing production in a city and a region that already has an acute shortage, will make maintaining properties more difficult, and will hurt tax revenues.

Wu's proposal would mark the return of rent control to Boston, where a law was previously in place from 1969 until state voters prohibited rent control in a 1994 referendum. In the 1994 referendum, Boston and neighboring Cambridge were the only Boston communities to vote against abolishing rent control (both voting doing so by large margins).

=== Sports facilities ===
Wu has championed the renovation White Stadium through a public-private partnership which will see it host a new team in the National Women's Soccer League. Some neighborhood organizations and the Emerald Necklace Conservancy have opposed the renovation, and the latter has filed litigation against it.

In 2024, Wu voiced concerns towards plans by the Kraft Group to develop a soccer stadium in the adjacent municipality of Everett to house the New England Revolution (its team in Major League Soccer). In late 2023, she criticized the lack of "any outreach or conversation" with the city of Boston before zoning changes related to the project were pursued as a proposed rider to a broader spending bill. She also expressed concerns that due to the project's proximity to the municipal border between Everett and Boston, the congestion that the project will generate will be more severe in Boston than Everett. Citing the likelihood that many spectators for events at the stadium would access the stadium by walking from facilities in the Charlestown and Sullivan Square neighborhoods of Boston, she posited that, "the foot traffic and congestion impacts would fall most heavily on Boston." After the state house rejected legislation in August 2024 that would have helped to advanced the project, there was media speculation that Wu had played a successful behind-the-scenes role in persuading legislators' votes. When questioned as to whether she had been working to persuade state legislators' votes on legislation pertaining to the Kraft proposal, she commented, "I have made my views and hopes clear on this issue, as in every other one that's before the State House affecting Boston," but did not take outright credit for securing the legislation's defeat, remarking "there's a lot of speculation about what happened and why." At the very end of 2025, Wu and the Kraft Group reached a community benefits agreement in which Boston removed its objections to the project. Conservative writer Joe Battenfeld noted, "To the get the deal done, Wu, who has repeatedly trashed Trump and billionaires, ignored the [Robert] Kraft-[Donald] Trump bromance and the fact that Kraft’s son, Josh, ran against her in the 2025 mayor’s race." Battenfeld characterized the Krafts as having received more favorable terms than the Wu administration. While noting that Wu had l tactics she could have used to delay the project and have driven a harder bargain, he also conceded that such tactics would have run the risk of being mistaken (in the eyes of the general public) for political retribution against the Kraft family due to Josh Kraft's recent campaign against her.

== Transportation ==
Boston's public transportation operator, the MBTA, is a division of the Massachusetts Department of Transportation, limiting the power that the mayor of Boston has over transportation in the city. Nevertheless, Wu has taken actions and voiced positions related to the city's transportation.

Wu advocated for Bostonians to have a more direct voice in the MBTA. In the state budget passed in August 2023, a seat was created on the MBTA board to be appointed by the mayor of Boston. Wu had advocated for such a seat on the board representing Boston since her time on the Boston City Council, and this was regarded to be a political victory for her.

In August 2022, Wu's city administration and the state government worked together to prepare for and alleviate the impact of a several-week closure of a key segment of the MBTA Orange Line to facilitate needed repairs. Wu outlined alternate public transportation means that could utilized by MBTA riders during the closure. Wu also urged Boston area residents that could to utilize MBTA commuter rail lines in order to avoid increased road congestion anticipated to result from the Orange Line closure. Wu also worked to facilitate the operations shuttle busses to several neighborhoods, making sure space was reserved for the loading and unloading of passengers. Wu urged employers in the parts of the city impacted by the closure to avoid giving penalties to employees that show up tardy to work as a consequence of their impacted commutes. Amid this closure and other concerns, such as a temporary closure of a smaller part of the MBTA Green Line, Wu disagreed with the prospect of the Federal Transit Administration assuming control of the MBTA, remarking that the system's problems, which she called "a breaking point", called for, "a partnership, not a takeover" from the federal government.

Also in August 2022, Wu and local transit advocacy organizations requested federal assistance to be provided to the MBTA to address service cuts made to the MBTA's service as a result of staffing shortages. They urged for the state's congressional delegation and for Pete Buttigieg (United States secretary of transportation) to take action to direct assistance to the MBTA. While she has not pursued it, Wu has expressed an openness towards the idea of implementing congestion pricing on peak hour automobile traffic.

=== Fare-free bus routes ===
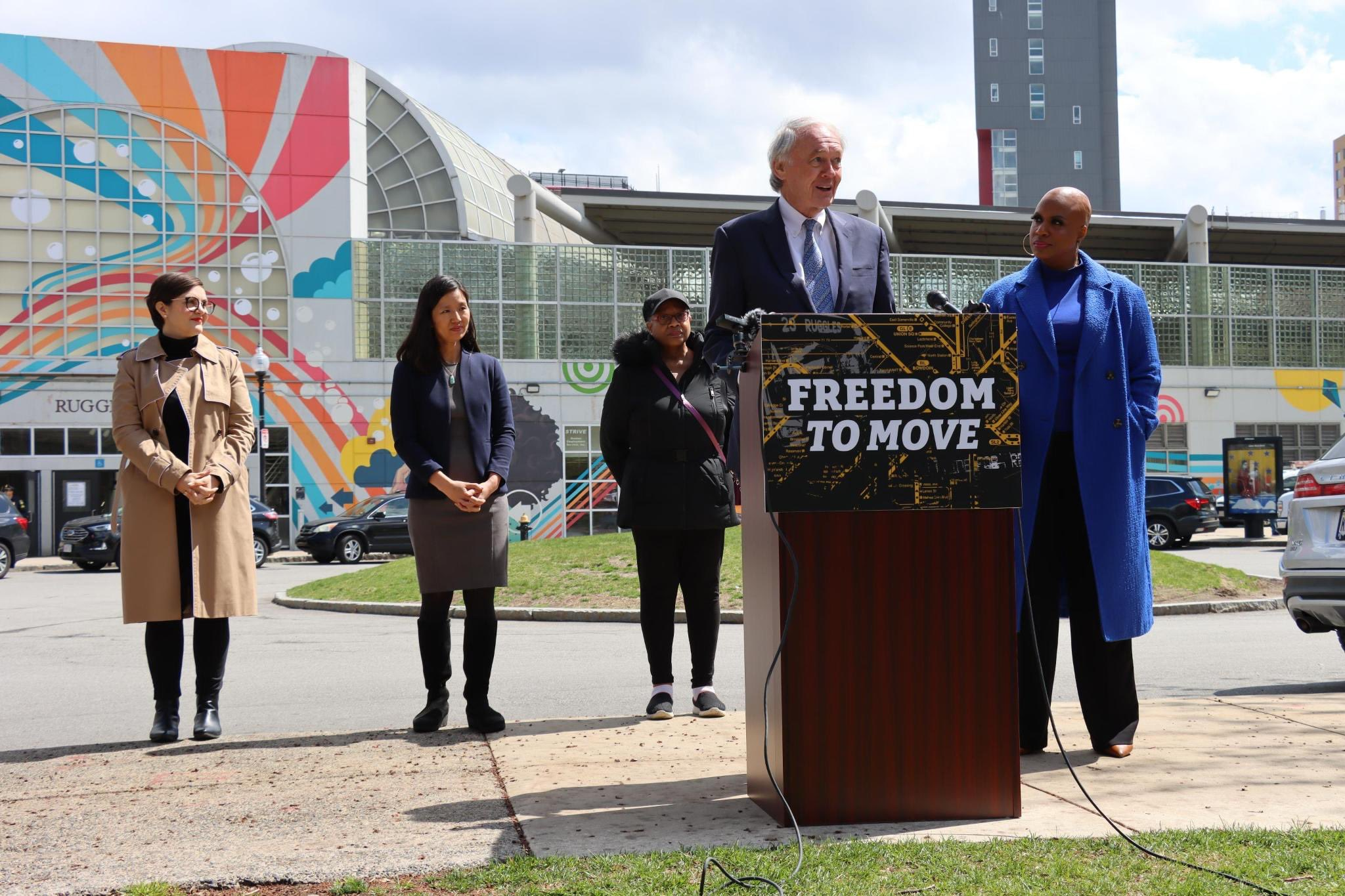
Wu (second from left) stands with Senator Ed Markey (second from right), Congresswoman Ayanna Pressley (far right), and others at an April 2023 press conference for the Freedom to Move Act that would provide federal funding for fare-free public transport

In December 2021 Wu extended the fare-free pilot program for the MBTA Route 28 bus that was started under the acting mayoralty of Kim Janey by two months. She did this with while engaging in talks with the MBTA to further extend the pilot program. In mid-November 2021, Wu sent an appropriations order to the Boston City Council to ask for approval to appropriate $8 million of federal funds to fund two years of fare-free service on the MBTA Route 23, 28, and 29 buses. These buses serve the Dorchester, Mattapan, and Roxbury communities. At the start of December, the City Council approved the appropriations order 12–1. On February 9, 2022, it was announced by Wu and MBTA General Manager Steve Poftak that the two-year program for the three routes to be fare-free was officially agreed to and would be launched on March 1, 2022. In February 2024, the city authorized a $8.4 million two-year extension of the three-route pilot into 2026.

== Racial equity ==
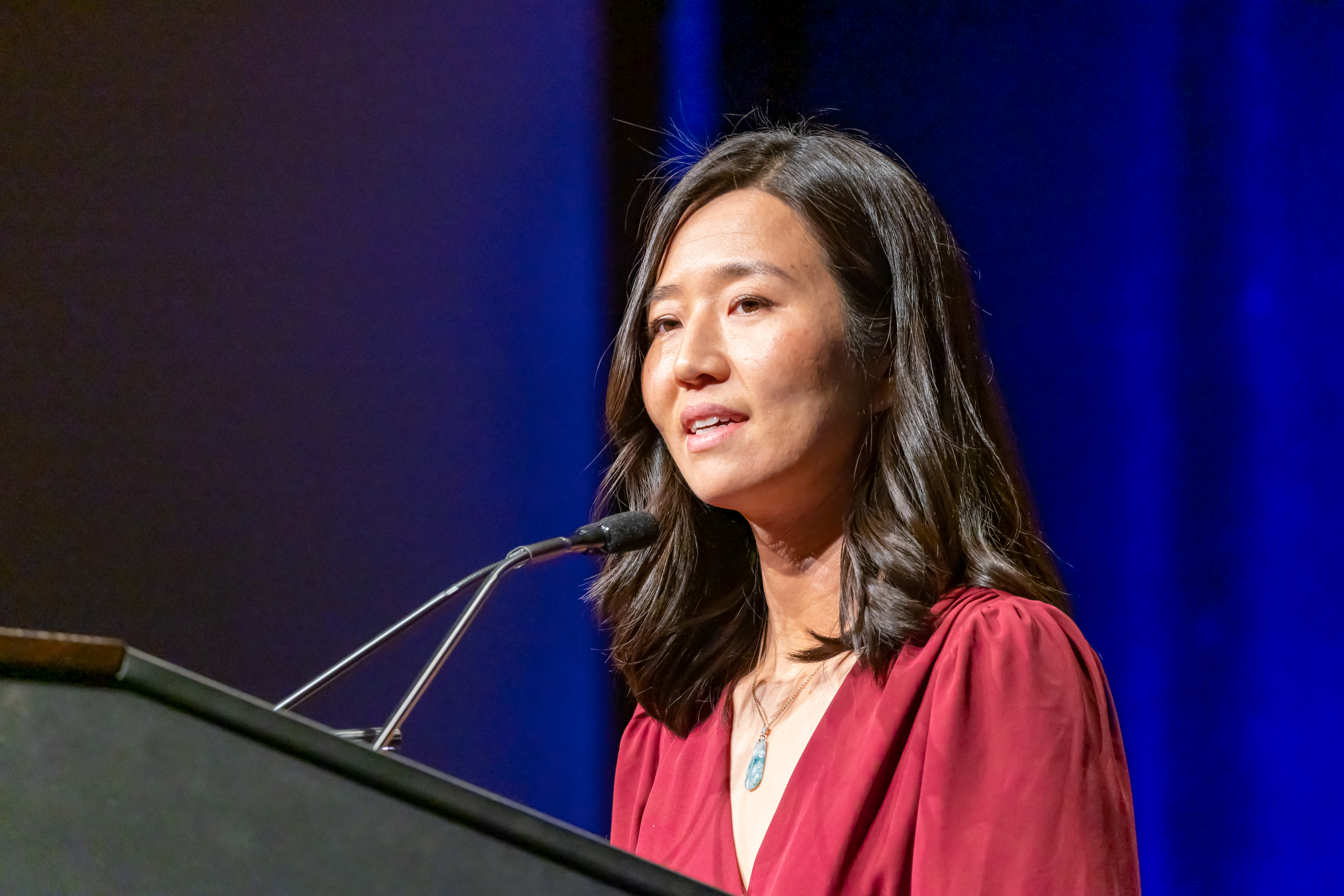
Wu speaking at Boston's 2023 Martin Luther King Jr. Day Breakfast

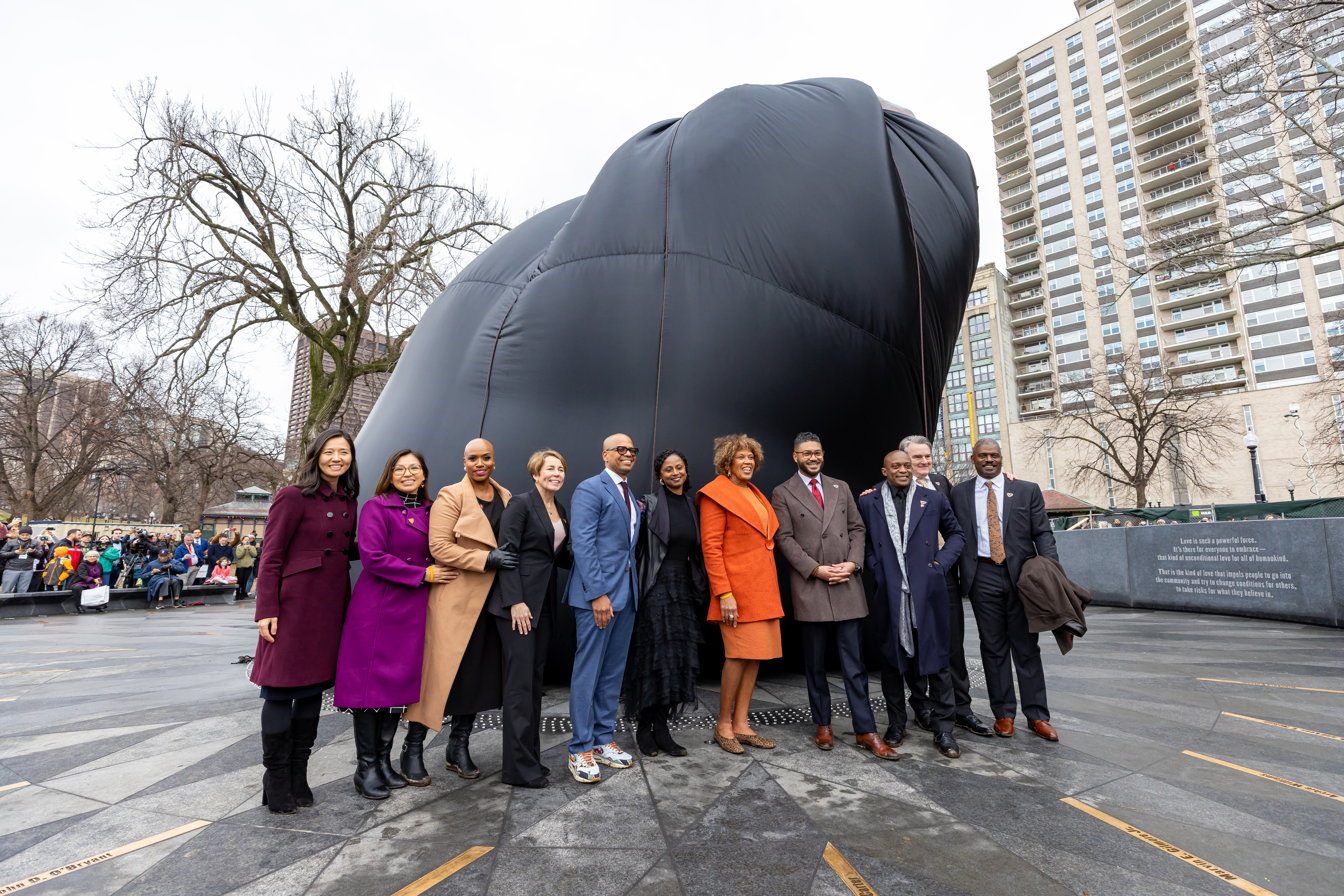
Wu (left) poses with a group (including Congresswoman Ayanna Pressley and Governor Maura Healey at the January 2023 unveiling of The Embrace

Wu has expressed a belief that her cabinet should be reflective of the city's population, arguing that that is consequential towards making the city's government more responsive to its different communities. People of color hold a majority in her cabinet. As of August 2022, Wu's cabinet had thirteen Black members, thirteen White members, six Latinx members, and two Asian American members.

In February 2022, Wu established the city's Office for Black Male Advancement (OBMA), which will be a component of the city's already-existing Equity and Inclusion Cabinet. Wu's office stated that,

The Mayor’s Office for Black Male Advancement will work to improve outcomes and reduce systemic barriers to advancement for Black men and boys living in the City of Boston.

The office will, among other responsibilities, design projects and programs to promote equity benefiting Black men and boys, advancing the representation of Black men and boys in city government, and collaborating with the city on advocating for state and federal programs and legislation related to Black men and boys. The office will also oversee the Commission on Black Men and Boys that had been established by an ordinance signed by Kim Janey during her acting mayoralty.

In January 2022, Wu signed an executive order to adopt a municipal Affirmatively Furthering Fair Housing policy. This made Boston the largest city in the United States to adopt such a policy.

In May 2022, Boston awarded a $17 million contract to City Fresh Foods, a local Black-owned business, to be a vendor for Boston City Schools. This was the largest non-construction contract that the city had awarded to a certified Black-owned business in its history. This has been credited as being indicative of Wu impacting how the city government views matters of diversity. The contract has also been credited as helping to achieve the goals of the Good Food Purchasing Program that was created by an ordinance that had been authored by Wu as a city councilwoman.

In December 2023, Wu faced accusations of racism when Denise DosSantos, Wu's director of City Council relations (an employee of the City of Boston) accidentally sent an invite on her behalf to all the Councillors for a holiday party meant exclusively for "Electeds of Color". Wu said that sending the invitations to White council members was an honest mistake, and that the party is one of the many private events held for different affinity groups, and that she looked forward to seeing everyone on the council at other opportunities to celebrate the holidays together. She said that she was asked to host the "Electeds of Color Holiday Party", which has been held for more than a decade for elected officials of color from all over Massachusetts. Other councilors of color defended the party saying that it was a way for people with "shared experiences" to come together. The Office of the Attorney General of Massachusetts rejected complaints on the matter, finding that no laws had been violated. In February 2024, the conservative group Judicial Watch filed a lawsuit against Wu claiming that she failed to honor a public records request for communications related to the holiday party.

In December 2023, Wu apologized on behalf of the city for the impact that police conduct in the investigation of the 1989 murder of Carol Stuart had upon the African-American community in the city, especially in Mission Hill. Her apology was directly addressed to Willie Bennett and Alan Swanson, who had been wrongly treated as suspects.

In May 2024, Wu appointed former state legislator Byron Rushing to serve as advisor to the city's Reparations Task Force.

== Education and childcare ==
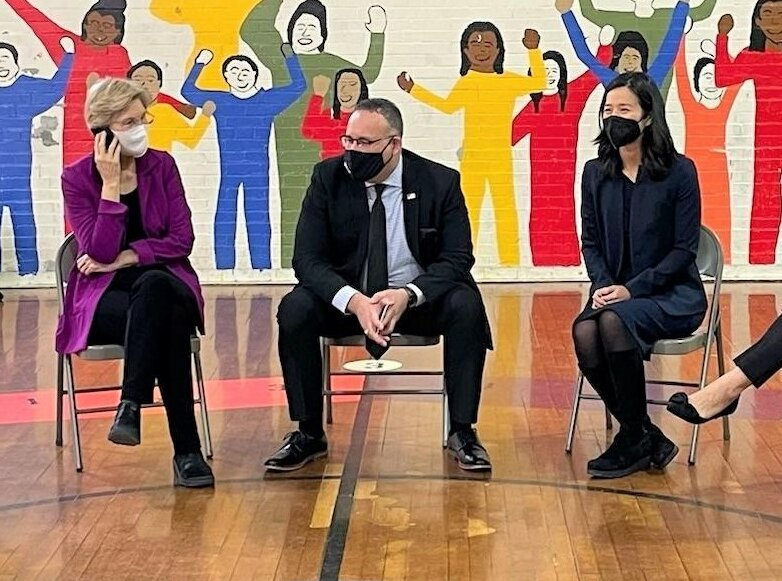
Wu (right) in March 2022 with U.S. Secretary of Education Miguel Cardona (center) and Senator Elizabeth Warren (left)

In May 2022, Wu unveiled plans for a "Green New Deal" for Boston Public School buildings which doubles the capital spending that the city will devote to the construction new and renovated school buildings to $2 billion compared to the $1 million that had been outlined in former mayor Marty Walsh's 2015 BuildBPS plan. Wu has pledged for the city to have a more equitable and transparent process for school construction and capital improvements than in the past and that the process will involve input from students, educators, and parents. In September 2022, Wu announced the creation of the Cabinet for Worker Empowerment. One of the tasks of this new department is providing oversight to this "Green New Deal" for the city's schools. Another of the department's tasks is to establish a trust fund for childcare.

In mid-2022, Wu distributed grants to family childcare providers. In July 2022, Wu signed an executive order which outlined the formula for what funds developers building in the city's downtown must contribute to fund child care services in the city. This executive order builds upon a policy implemented in 1989 under the mayoralty of Raymond Flynn which requires that new commercial developments in the city's downtown provide childcare services on-site or otherwise fund resources for off-site childcare spaces. However, the policy had, previous to Wu's executive order, been difficult to enforce due to the fact that the policy did not previous provide a clear definition of the amounts that developers needed to pay.

In 2022, Wu stayed neutral in the Boston School Committee's selection of new Boston Public Schools superintendent. Wu opposed proposals by the state to place Boston Public Schools into state receivership, which arose from negative assessments of the city's schools in studies that were taken in 2020, before her mayoralty. In June 2022, Wu and Massachusetts state education officials settled on an agreement to improve Boston Public Schools, averting receivership. In February 2023, Wu vetoed a city council ordinance to advance a home rule petition that requested that the state make the city's public school board an elected body. Wu wrote that she, "deeply respect[s]" the advocates' of the ordinance, but, "cannot support legislative changes that would compromise our ability to stabilize and support the Boston Public Schools during this critical period." Previously, when she had run for mayor in 2021 Wu's education plan had called for a restructuring of the Boston School Committee that would have seen the committee have a majority of its seats be elected. Wu backed away from this support of a transition to a partially elected board after becoming mayor, arguing that it was an inopportune time for such a change to take place. As of 2024, Wu's own children attend public schools in the city.

In June 2023, Wu and Boston Public Schools superintendent Mary Skipper unveiled plans to relocate the John D. O'Bryant School of Mathematics & Science (a public exam school) from the campus in Roxbury it shares with the Madison Park Technical Vocational High School to a vacant complex in West Roxbury. This was touted as allowing for the Madison Park (the city's sole vocation school) to be expanded and improved, and for the O'Bryant school to be given a dedicated and modernized facility. However, this proposal faced vocal opposition from those involved with the O'Bryant school, as well as from elected officials. Some of the opposition relate to concerns about West Roxbury being less accessible by public transit than Roxbury is –something that the city sough to address with plans to run shuttle buses for students between transit hubs and the proposed West Roxbury location. Other opposition was centered on the difference in racial makeups between Roxbury and West Roxbury: as Roxbury is considered Boston's most significant black cultural center and West Robxury is a White-majority neighborhood. Other objections took issue with the quick timeline of the proposed move, and a perceived lack of community engagement in formulating the planned move. In response to objections, the city abandoned the plan in February 2024, citing a "lack of consensus" in support of the plan. The following month, Wu conceded that the city had errored in its approach to announcing and pursuing the proposed relocation.

Wu remained neutral (declining to publicly endorse a position) on the November 2024 state ballot question on whether a passing performance on the 10th grade Massachusetts Comprehensive Assessment System exam (MCAS, a standards-based assessment) should remain a requirement for high school graduation in Massachusetts. While Wu confirmed that she would be casting a vote in the referendum when casting her own secret ballot in the November election, Wu expressed that she did have a firm enough preference on the referendum to give any public endorsement. While agreeing that there was valid criticism against the status quo (opining that, "tests should not be used in a high-stakes way," because of their propensity to unfairly assess students with learning differences), she couched her hesitancy to endorse a "yes" vote in her own concern that that the question did not posit enough specifics on how an elimination of the graduation requirement would be implemented. She also couched her hesitancy to voice a public "yes" endorsement in her belief that the aspects she believed it outlined appeared insufficient on their own to maintain high standards. Massachusetts voters ultimately approved the measure

== Business, labor, and economic development ==
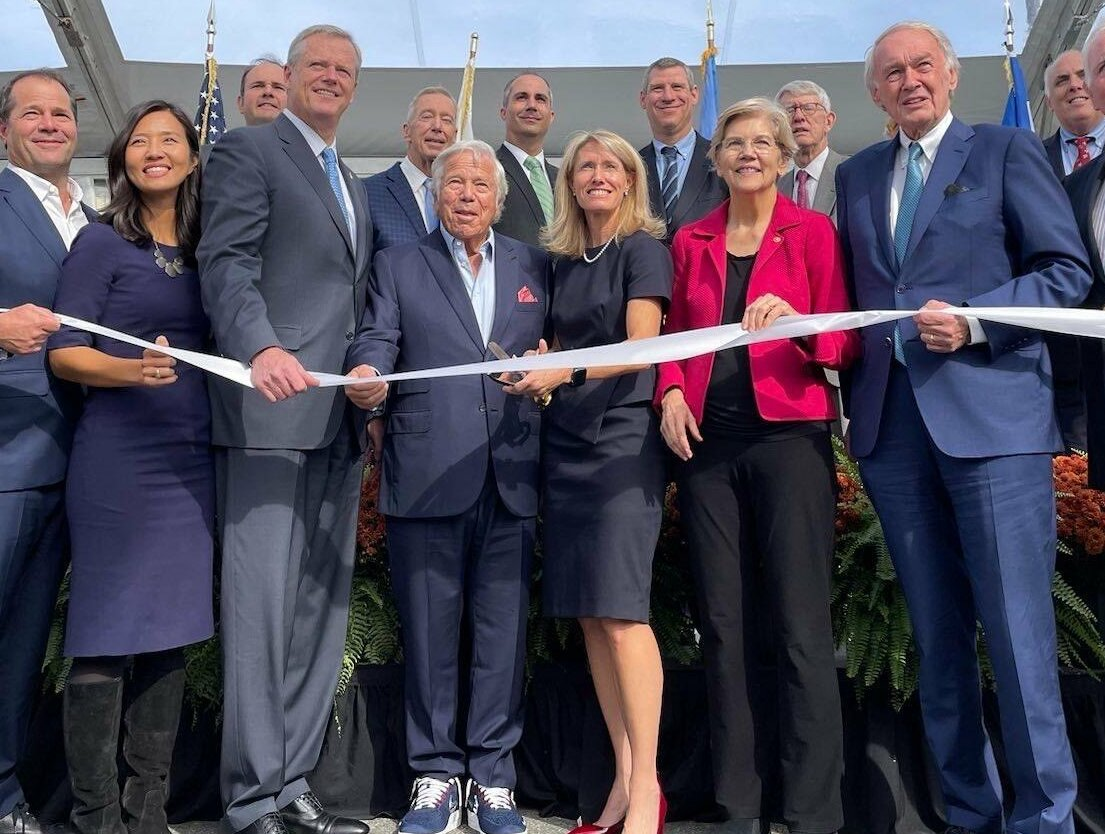
Wu and others celebrate the October 2023 ribbon-cutting ceremony for a modernized Port of Boston (Front row includes: Gov. Charlie Baker, businessman Robert Kraft, Port Director Lisa Wieland, Sen. Elizabeth Warren, Sen. Ed Markey; back row includes: Rep. Stephen Lynch, City Council Pres. Ed Flynn)

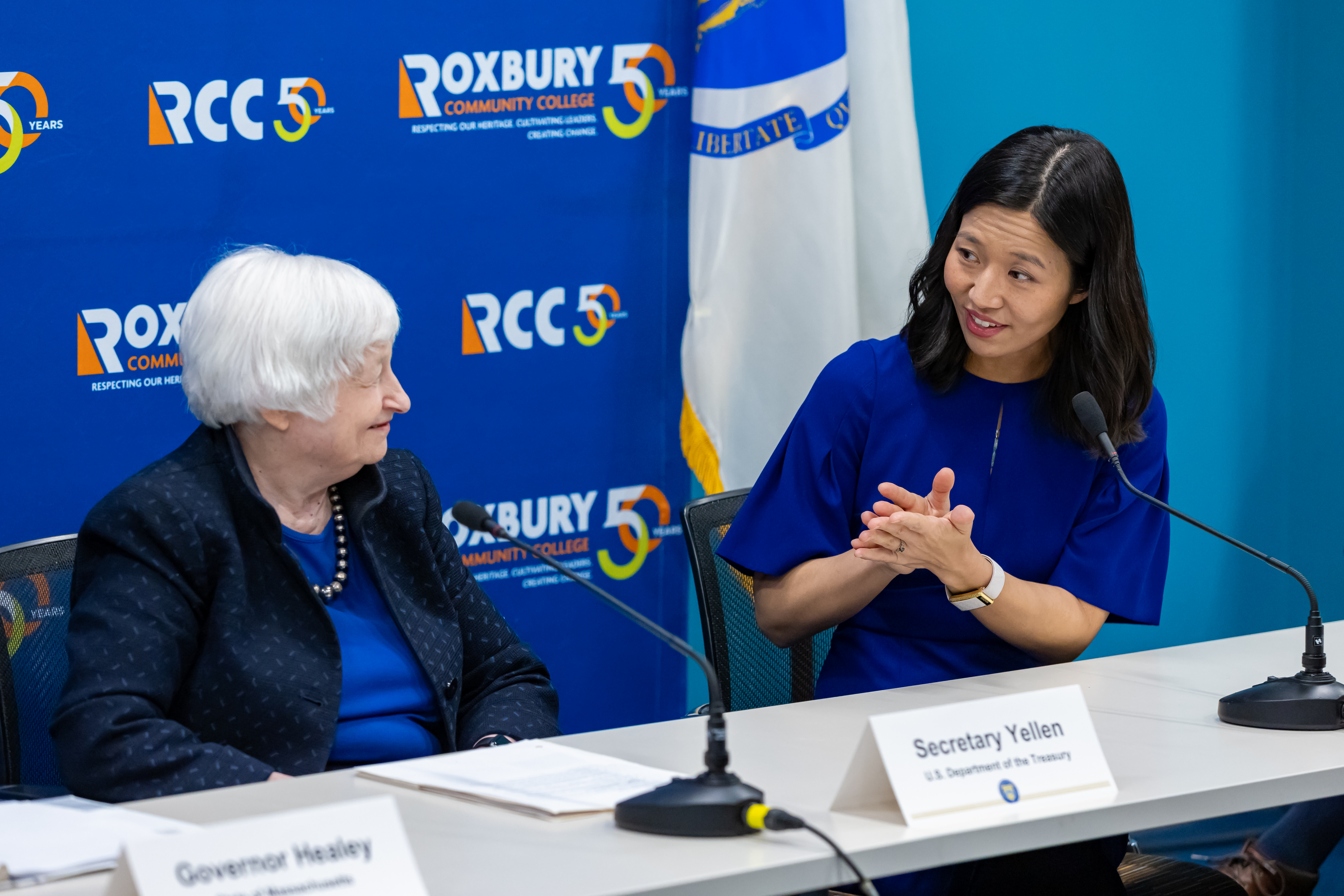
Wu (right) speaking with U.S. Secretary of the Treasury Janet Yellen in January 2024

In August 2022, Boston received a $23 million American Rescue Plan challenge grant from the Economic Development Administration to establish a Regional Workforce Training System aimed at training and placing individuals for 4,618 quality jobs in targeted industries over three years starting in October 2022. The Mayor's Office of Workforce Development had been the lead applicant, working with other there parties and organizations in their grant application. On Labor Day 2022, Wu announced the creation of the Cabinet for Worker Empowerment. One of the tasks this new department was assigned is overseeing the creation of more job training centers in the city.

After becoming mayor, Wu announced that she would rename the city's office of economic development the "Office of Economic Opportunity & Inclusion" and would name Segun Idowu to head it. Wu announced that Midori Morikawa, who had under Walsh and Janey been the interim chief of economic development, would be assigned a new position focused on neighborhood development. In early 2023, Wu created the new position of "director of nightlife economy", a role that is focused on overseeing development of nightlife-centered development in the city. In June 2023, Wu announced a $4 million workforce development program to provide job training to 1,000 Boston residents for entry into the biotechnology industry.

The annual economic annual report published by the Boston Planning and Development Agency analyzing the 2023 fiscal year found positive economic indicators in regards to employment, wages, inflation, consumer spending, air travel, hotel occupancy, and pedestrian traffic. Many important metrics had returned to the levels they had been at prior to the COVID-19 pandemic downturn. Jim Rooney (the president and CEO of the Greater Boston Chamber of Commerce) commented that the report indicated that Boston was enjoying a strong economy. Niki Griswold of The Boston Globe characterized the report as, "present[ing an] optimistic outlook for Boston’s economy." Gayla Cawley of The Boston Herald characterized the report as showing a, "relatively rosy picture of economic rebound." However, amid a national downturn in office space demand due to the increased prevalence of remote work, the report showed that office vacancy rates and commercial property values were weak. This led some business leaders to raise concerns about the long-term economic impact that the decrease in office demand would have on the city's economy.

=== Working relationship with business leaders ===
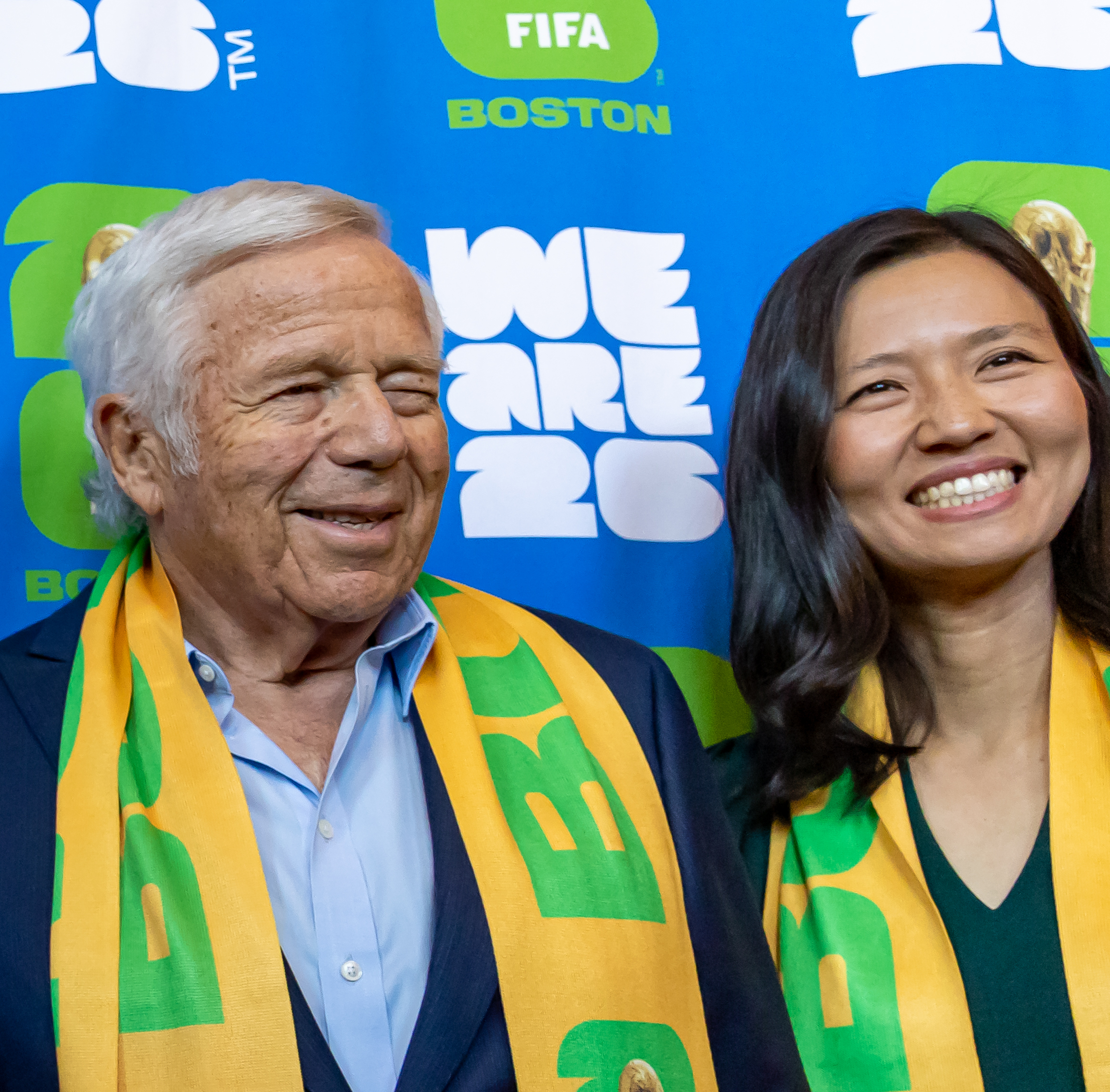
Wu with businessman Robert Kraft (owner of the New England Patriots) at a May 2023 event promoting Gillette Stadium's hosting of matches for the 2026 FIFA World Cup

It has been observed that Wu's approach to dealing with the city's business elite has differed from her predecessors, giving them less meetings and access than previous mayors had. In May 2023, Brian McGrory of The Boston Globe observed that Wu has given greater precedence toward attending to other municipal concerns than she does to giving an audience to the city's business elites. Describing Wu as "a different kind of mayor, with a different view of her city" from her predecessors, McGrory wrote,

When Wu sets her priorities...[and] when she imagines her legacy, she’s not gazing at the city’s skyline or at the people who are building it. Rather, she’s obsessed with the seemingly intractable problems that fester in the shadows of those gleaming towers."

As a result of her approach (as well as some objections among business elite to certain policies she has pursued), Wu has been characterized as having had an uneasy working relationship with many of the city's business elite. Dealing with inherited crises such as Mass & Cass and the city's COVID-19 response when she took office, in her first year as mayor Wu's direct availability to business leaders was especially sparse. Even after she began to hold more meetings in her second year, she generally avoided one-on-one meetings and would instead meet with them as parts of group discussions on areas of policy relevant to their industries. This lack of a direct-line to the mayor and one-on-one meetings with her proved frustrating to many business leaders that had enjoyed such preferential access to previous mayors. In May 2023, Shirley Lueng of The Boston Globe observed that,

Previous mayors have welcomed tête-à-têtes with real estate developers and other captains of industry to discuss projects or other matters. Often, those were one-on-one meetings. But that hasn’t been Wu’s style. Instead, she prefers to assemble groups of leaders to help shape specific policies and forge public-private partnerships...the noticeable change in approach continues to ruffle the feathers of those who are used to having the ear of the mayor, all of which is perpetuating a narrative that Wu is indifferent to business interests."

It has been also been observed by The Boston Globe that Wu grants substantially less meetings to real estate developers than her processors had, giving them less opportunities to directly lobby her. Leung wrote in December 2022 of Wu's relationship with developers,

Wu owes them nothing. She won on a populist agenda. She would rather hang out with small business owners, community activists, and constituents.

Additionally, Wu reforms to the city's development approval process have faced opposition from portions of the city's business community.

=== 2022 North End outdoor dining policy ===
In early 2022, some restaurant owners, particularly many in Boston's North End, criticized Wu for only allowing North End restaurants to take part in the city's pilot outdoor dining program a month after restaurants in other neighborhoods were allowed to participate, and for levying a $7,500 charge for North End restaurants that wished to take part in the pilot program while not charging that fee for other parts of the city. Wu argued that the rationale for this was that seventy-seven outdoor dining patios were located in a single 0.2 square miles (0.52 km^{2}) area of the North End, a particularly large number in a small area. Wu claimed that these policies were done in an attempt to help "strike the right balance with thoughtful spacing, time limitations, increased safety protections, and other resources necessary to mitigate the impacts on parking, trash, rodents, and public safety."

In addition to affected restaurant owners' resistance, this controversy was taken up as a cause by many general critics of Wu, making it a heated matter.

Boston Herald political columnist Joe Battenfeld, a general critic of Wu, expressed agreement with Wu's policies related to North End restaurants, calling it, "one of the few times Wu has been right in her young administration." He argued that the charge seemed to be "a reasonable amount", and argued that if the restaurants did not pay for the expenses related to the impact of their use of road and sidewalk space, the expenses would be borne by the city's taxpayers. Battenfeld asked his readers, "Why should taxpayers subsidize restaurants, which make a hefty profit, for their outdoor dining spaces? The answer is they shouldn't." Contrarily, when Tufts University political science professor Jeffrey Berry gave WCVB-TV his overall positive assessment of Wu's first six months in office, he expressed the belief that her handling of outdoor dining on the North End had been a significant misstep. He opined, "The North End mess, and I do call it a mess, is a self-inflicted wound. It was not necessary. She overreached in terms of what she was going to charge restaurateurs there. It seemed excessive."

A lawsuit was launched by several North End restaurant owners over the policy. In March 2023, a group of five North End restaurant owners filed an amended version of the lawsuit naming Wu as a defendant with by adding an allegation that the policy had been an act of anti-Italian discrimination.

In both 2023 and 2024, the city's outdoor dining program did not make outdoor dining available to North End restaurants.

=== Liquor licenses ===
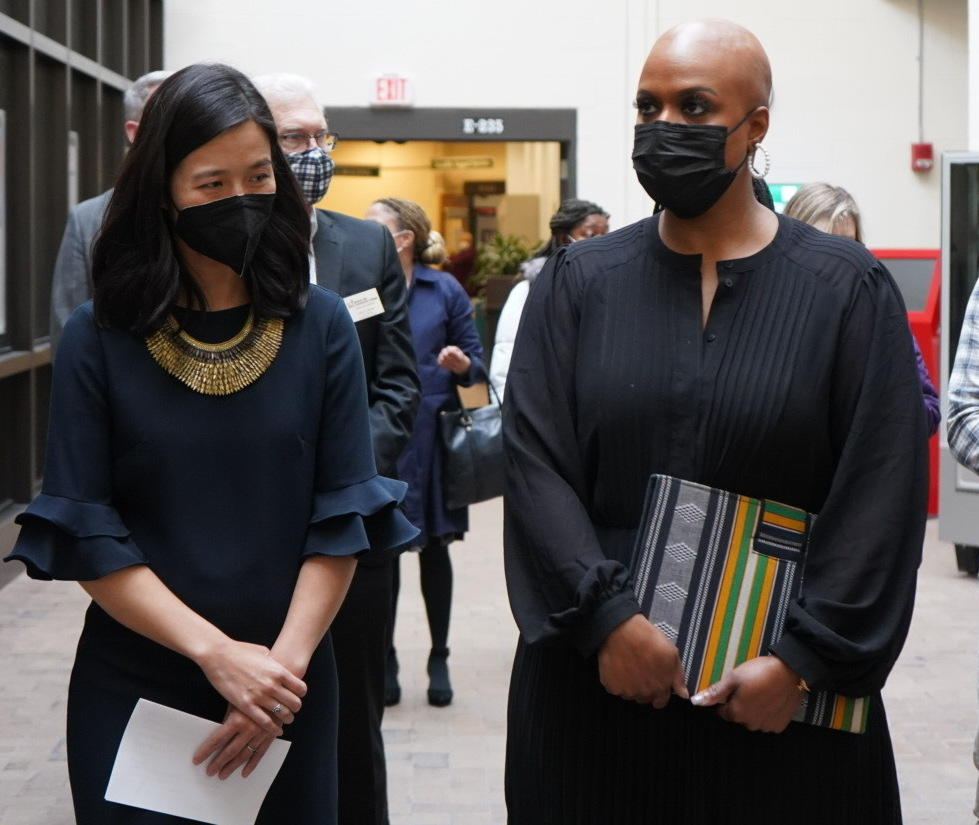
Wu with Congresswoman Ayanna Pressley in May 2022

Since the Prohibition era, the state government of Massachusetts has held control over capping the number of liquor licenses in Boston. The number of liquor licenses in the city are capped by the state, and existing liquor licenses can be privately transferred from one license owner to another. This makes them very expensive for new restaurants to acquire. The difficulty of obtaining a liquor license was credited as being a barrier to success for less-monied parties interested in opening new dining establishments. It is also cited as limiting the city's nightlife scene, being seen as posing a major obstacles to those seeking to open and operate restaurants and nightlife venues. When she was a city councilor, Wu criticized this as creating unfair conditions for small restaurants, and had supported an unsuccessful effort by then-councilor Ayanna Pressley to have control over liquor licenses in the city become localized. As city councilor, she also had (with hopes of putting non-license-holding smaller restaurants and more competitive footing with license-holding ones) authored a adopted law change that allows diners to bring their own alcoholic drinks into certain restaurants ("BYOB").

Around the time Wu took office as mayor, the city had 1,1000 liquor licenses. A 2022 report found that only 2% of establishments with liquor licenses were owned by individuals who identified as being Black. The report also found that neighborhoods with a greater proportion of White residents had a greater share of liquor licenses than neighborhoods that were less white.

In October 2023, Wu requested the state legislature allow the state new liquor licenses to distribute, arguing that this would allow the city to award licenses to neighborhoods with disproportionately few license holding businesses. Wu successfully advanced a home rule petition through the city council that month requesting 250 additional licenses. In September 2024, the state legislature passed corresponding bills which awarded the city 225 additional liquor licenses. Governor Healey soon after signed the bill into law. The city is to award the licenses over the course of the following three years.

== Law enforcement and crime management ==
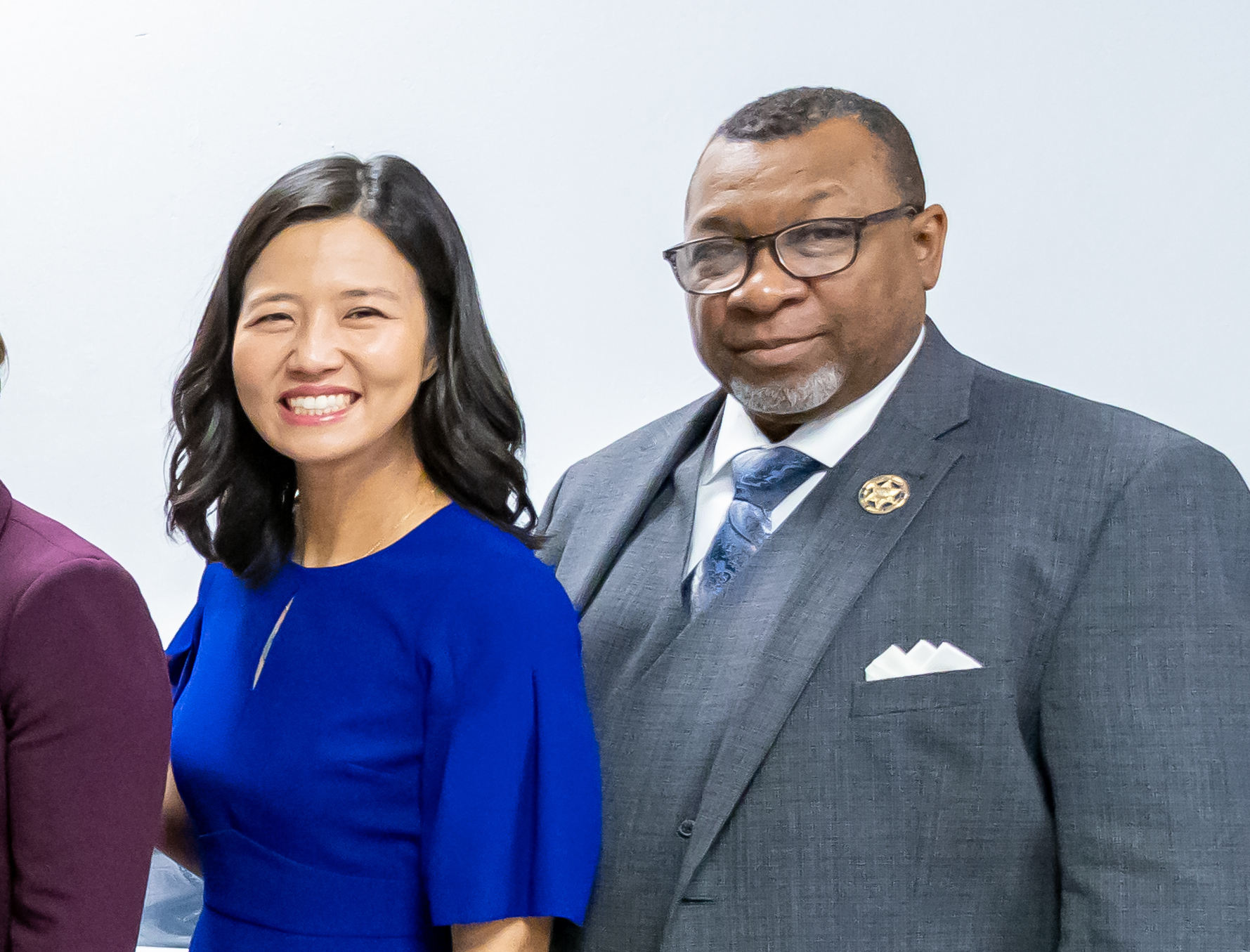
Wu with Suffolk County Sheriff Steven W. Tompkins in January 2024

In July 2022, following a seven-month search, Wu named Michael Cox as the new commissioner of the Boston Police Department.

Wu increased funding to the Boston Regional Intelligence Center's gang database. The database has been controversial in Boston. She has touted that those tasked with maintaining the database have adopted new procedures to remove thousands of names from it that are no longer relevant. Previously, as a city councilor, she had voted against accepting federal funds for the database due to concerns she had at the time. Before becoming mayor, she had also proposed dismantling the database and even had floated the idea of abolishing the Boston Regional Intelligence Center, positions which she no longer advocates for.

In her bid for re-election in 2025, Wu's candidacy received an early endorsement from the Boston Police Patrolmen's Association (the city's main police union) and affiliated emergency medical services (EMS) unions. In their endorsement, the union's leadership praised Wu's performance in office, and noted that this marked the unions' first endorsement of an incumbent mayor's re-election in thirty years.

=== Violence reduction ===
In early 2023, Wu's administration set a goal of reaching a 20% to the city's annual homicide rate by 2026. Over the course of 2023, Boston experienced the fewest homicides it had seen in any year on record. 2023 also saw a new record low for gun violence rates in the city. In 2024, the city a significant further reduction in its homicide rate. In 2024, Boston recorded what local law enforcement hailed as one of the city's safest years on record, reaching a new recorded low number of homicides. The number of shooting fatalities was noted to have greatly decreased over the previous three years. By the end of 2024, the city had exceeded its objective of reaching a 20% reduction in annual homicides ahead of schedule. Journalist Jenna Russell of The New York Times opined that a degree of good fortune had contributed to the 2024 reduction in the city's homicide rate, but noted that Wu's government was also dedicating "high level of precision to its strategy to prevent violence."

By 2024 and 2025, data indicated that Boston was safer than many similarly-sized cities in the United States. Wu herself hailed Boston as the "safest major city" in the United States. In October 2024, Adam Reilly of GBH opined that while Boston was clearly an "exceptionally safe" major city, numbers neither definitively proved or disproved Wu's characterization of it as the safest major city. An article published by the Vera Institute of Justice in September 2024 opined that it was fair for Wu to call Boston "one of the safest major cities" in the United States, noting

The city has made headlines throughout the past year for its public safety numbers. No statistic is more remarkable than 2024's plummeting homicide rate. In the first quarter of 2024, Boston led major United States cities in year-to-date homicide declines, dropping 82 percent. Extended through June 30, data showed homicide numbers for 2024 had fallen by 78 percent compared to the same time in 2023. Now, on the cusp of autumn, the downward trend persists...Just a year after city leaders announced a plan to diminish annual homicides by 20 percent by 2026—32 incidents or less—they are more than making good on the goal.

The Vera Institute credited Boston's violence reduction to implementation of agency-based public safety efforts, hospital-based public safety efforts, and community-based public safety efforts. It also noted that while Boston was leading other city's in its rate of homicide reduction, it was coinciding with a national trend of declining homicide rates, opining, "although its homicide statistics are striking, Boston’s public safety landscape is not a complete outlier, but rather a prominent example of a nationwide downward trend and the work behind it." Other experts have credited the city's Violence Intervention and Prevention Initiative among other municipal programs as driving a reduction in crime. In December 2024, an article published by the United States Conference of Mayors hailed Boston as "the safest big city in America" and ""a model of urban safety"" which observed, "a big part of Boston’s push to reduce crime centers around community. The Mayor’s Office, Boston Public Health Commission, Boston Police Department, and other agencies created a network that treats violence as a public safety and public health issue."

In the first half of 2025, Boston homicide rates increased somewhat from the year prior. However, its rates were still similar to rate of 2023, which had previously been a record-low. Crime researcher Thomas Abt observed, "Boston's success in driving gun violence downward now means that small increases in homicides look large in percentage terms. Overall, the city's anti-violence efforts are a success."

=== 2023 police union contract ===
In June 2023, Wu vetoed a $5 million cut in Boston Police and Veterans Services department that was passed by the City Council. She called this proposed cut, "illusory, as the city is obligated to cover salary and overtime expenses incurred by the department."

In December 2023, Wu reached a contract agreement with the Boston Police Patrolmen's Association. In the terms of the contract, the union agreed that officers would lose the option to use arbitration to appeal firings or other disciplinary measures if they are convicted of certain crimes. The contract also saw the union agree to allow pay details of the department to be made public, and for their to be more strict outlines on when officers are permitted to take medical leave. Yawu Miller of the Bay State Banner described it as being, "the first [contract] in which [Boston] city officials have managed to secure significant reforms from the Patrolmen’s union." The five-year contract provided officers with 9% salary raises and other benefits. It was approved unanimously by the Boston City Council on December 13, 2024, In March 2024, a similar contract was reached with the Boston Police Detectives Benevolent Society. despite the council having a history of ideological division on issues of policing.

=== Handling of protesters ===
In March 2022, by a 9–4 vote, the City Council passed an ordinance that had been proposed the previous month by Wu to limit the hours at which targeted protests outside of people's homes can take place to between 9 a.m. and 9 p.m. Wu herself had been the subject of targeted protesting outside of her home against her COVID-19 measures. Violations are punishable by fine. The ordinance generated some controversy.

Wu has faced incidents of intense protest and altercation from individuals politically opposed to her. These have included altercations occurring inside of Boston City Hall, disturbances at formal events, extended demonstrations outside of Wu's personal residence, an incident in which Wu's personal residence was the target of swatting, and incidents in which Wu has been followed by automobile. Many of these incidents have involved frequent repeat protesters. This has been noted to possibly relate to a phenomenon observed in studies (such as a survey conducted in the fall of 2021 by the Mayor's Innovation Project) showing that female mayors and mayors who are persons of color are subjected to more political violence (both in the forms of psychological abuse and physical violence) than mayors who do not fall under either of those characteristics.

In 2023, it was revealed that after the 2022 Dorchester Day Parade Wu's office shared with the city's police department a list it had compiled naming protesters that Wu's office said had followed Wu and her family during the parade, harassing and physically intimidating them. The office said that it had forwarded this list after the Boston Police Department had requested information about this incident. Wu's spokesperson claimed the list included "people, who over the course of several months...harassed and physically intimidated the mayor and her family on a near daily basis." The list included individuals that had frequently protested Wu, including several individuals that had previously protested outside of Wu's residence. One individual on the list was a council candidate, while another was a North End restaurant owner that was wanted by police at the time for charges relating to a shooting. Wu received criticism from some news organizations for what some writers characterized as her sending the police a list of "critics". Some comparisons being made to the "enemies list" that had been compiled in the presidential administration of U.S. president Richard Nixon.

In late-April 2024, the Boston Police Department cleared tent encampments that pro-Palestinian protesters had erected at Emerson College and Northeastern University as part of the 2024 pro-Palestinian protests on university campuses in response to the Gaza war. Approximately 130 protesters were arrested at Emerson and approximately 120 were arrested at Northeastern. She took credit for having directed the police intervention in partnership with the police commissioner, but noted that the logistics of the intervention had been solely overseen by the commissioner. The police action was enforcing a 2023 statute restricting tent encampments. The statute in question had been adopted with the intent of addressing the Mass and Cass homelessness situation. She defended the decision to enforce the ordinance in regards to the protesters' encampment, characterizing this as being necessitated by the doctrine of equal enforcement. She noted that the ordinance had previously been enforced in more than thirty other circumstances to prevent the erection of new homeless tent encampments in the city, and argued that a decision to not enforce it against the protest encampment would constitute unjust selective enforcement. She asserted,

We cannot say to unhoused residents, "You have to comply with this ordinance that is on the books for health and safety, but if you're a student, or if you are for a cause that we agree with, then we're going to look the other way."

While protesters at the Emerson protest encampment alleged that the clearing of the encampment had seen excessive force, Wu asserted that a city review had been conducted and had not found any evidence of arrested protesters incurring injury leading to hospital treatment. She also noted that multiple police officers had been injured. She further noted that the clearing had come after days of unsuccessful efforts by the city and University to persuade the protesters to voluntarily remove the tents, with no city and college having given no objection to continued protest if the statute-violating tents were removed. Efforts to entice the voluntary removal of the tents included the college offering to make warming facility on their campus available for protesters to use at all hours if the protesters removed the tents. Wu characterized some of the protesters as having wanted a confrontation with the police, and having resisted attempts at de-escalation. She received some backlash over the police actions, with college affinity groups withdrawing their sponsorship of an event she was scheduled to hold at Harvard University, leading Wu to cancel the event. She was criticized on Twitter by a number of accounts that she had been following, leading her to unfollow several accounts.

== Budget matters ==
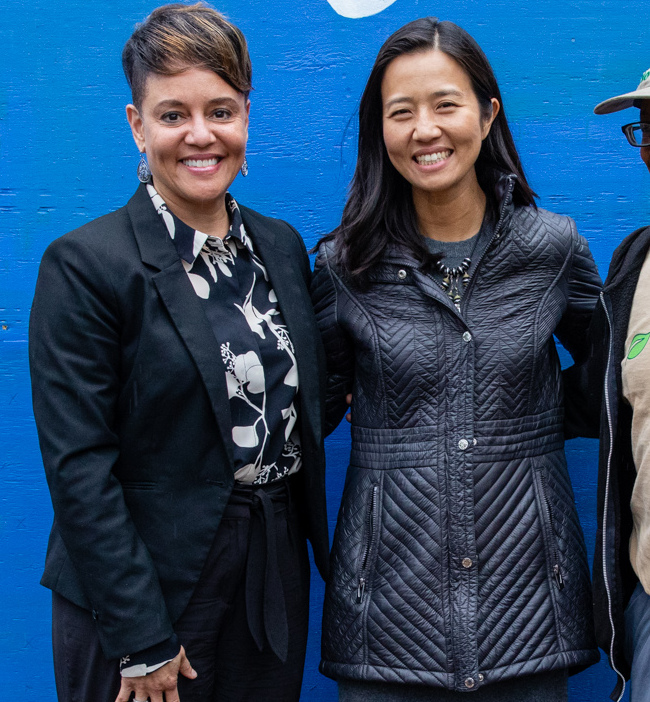
Wu with Jewel H. Bronaugh (deputy secretary of agriculture) in October 2022

In October 2022, Wu vetoed a 20% pay increase for city councilors that had been passed by the City Council. Wu had supported an 11% increase, which had been the recommendation of Boston's compensation advisory board, but opposed a 20% increase.

In June 2023, Wu vetoed a large number of budget amendments offered by the City Council, including amendments that otherwise would have resulted in decreased funding to the city's Office of Veterans Services and its police department, as well as an amendment aimed at increasing citizen input in budgeting. She also vetoed funding cuts for the Boston 's Transportation Department, Public Works Department, and the Boston Public Library. In all, Wu vetoed the majority of changes that the City Council made to the budget. Wu asserted that the cuts vetoed went against her belief that the city's budget should be, "built on a foundation of effective delivery of city services that are central to our residents' quality of life." The city council held votes on overriding six of Wu's vetos, but only one such vote reached the necessary threshold. This was for an addition the City Council has made to the budget to explicitly allocate $600,000 for pay raises to police officers. However, Wu has declared her intention to treat that change as illegal, arguing that the council's actions would amount to it illegally involving itself in the ongoing collective bargaining process between the city government and the Municipal Police Patrolmen's Union. Wu has agreed that a salary change is due, but regards the City Council's change to the budget to not be in accordance with the law.

== Immigration ==
Amid the immigration policy of the second Donald Trump administration, in 2025 immigration policies in Boston took on greater prominence than they had earlier in Wu's mayoralty.

During the presidential transition, after Wu publicly noted the city's existing 2014 law limiting the circumstances in which its police officers could cooperate with U.S. Immigration and Customs Enforcement (ICE) agents, Trump's designated border czar Tom Homan attacked Wu as "not very smart." Wu responded to this,

People can say whatever they want about me. This isn’t about me. Our public safety record speaks for itself. We are the safest major city in America, here in Boston. And it’s because of the work that’s put in every day to build trust between our residents and law enforcement, and it’s because of our focus on making sure we are there when residents need us.

Weeks into the second Trump administration, at the February 2025 Conservative Political Action Conference, Homan responded to an earlier news interview by Boston Police Commissioner Cox regarding the city's policies by threatening that the federal government would be "bringing hell" to the city of Boston. Afterwards, Wu posted on social media to express her confidence in Commissioner Cox.

Wu (holding her infant daughter) poses for a photograph with Congresswoman Pressley in March 5, 2025 in the congressional hearing room where Wu testified before the House Committee on Oversight and Government Reform. (In the photograph, Wu has ash on her forehead, as she observed the overlapping holiday of Ash Wednesday.)

In March 2025, Wu complied with a congressional subpoena and testified before the House Committee on Oversight and Government Reform in hearings about major "sanctuary city" policies and cooperation with federal immigration authorities. The hearings featured several other mayors of large American cities. John L. Milcek of MassLive described Wu's performance in the more than five hours of hearings as a "star turn" for her, writing, "the Democratic mayor deftly parried jibes from Republicans who sounded like they’d never set foot in Boston". Sri Taylor of Bloomberg News described the hearing as having carried "high stakes" for Wu, and credited her performance in the hearing with having garnering her a "newfound role as both a favorite foil for Republican critics in Washington and a capable messenger for Democrats," noting that while Republicans on the committee had hoped to hurt Wu's reputation in the hearings, "It was Wu who walked away with a series of sound bites defending Boston and Democrat priorities that made the rounds on social media and bolstered her national presence."

In June 2025, Wu signed an executive order outlining that the city would be submitting regular Freedom of Information Act (FOIA) requests regarding ICE activities, including forthcoming requests related to the policies governing federal immigration officers' use of face masks and their display of badges or identification.

In September 2025, U.S. Attorney General Pam Bondi filed a lawsuit against Boston and its police department, asserting that the Boston Trust Act (a so-called "sanctuary city" ordinance adopted in 2014) is a violation of federal law. Wu is named a co-defendant in her official capacity as mayor. The lawsuit characterizes the policy as "obstructionist", and alleges it interferes with federal immigration enforcement. Wu reacted to the lawsuit by declaring that Boston, "will not back down" in the face of federal pressure by the Trump administration. She further accused the Trump administration of attempting to impose an "authoritarian agenda", and defended Boston's law enforcement policies as making it the safest major city in the United States.

== Other matters ==
Wu has pursued litigation by the city against the United States Census Bureau for allegedly undercounting Boston's population in the 2020 United States Census, thereby hurting its access to federal resources.

== Other political activity ==
Wu endorsed Sonia Chang-Díaz's candidacy in the Democratic primary of the 2022 Massachusetts gubernatorial election. After Chang-Díaz withdrew from the race, Wu endorsed Maura Healey's successful gubernatorial candidacy. Wu endorsed the unsuccessful campaign of Shannon Liss-Riordan in the Democratic primary of the 2022 Massachusetts attorney general election. In 2022, she supported Chris Dempsey's unsuccessful campaign in the Democratic primary for Massachusetts state auditor. Also in 2022, Wu endorsed Steven W. Tompkins' reelection campaign for Suffolk County sheriff before his Democratic primary. Wu also endorsed a number of state legislature candidates in 2022. Before past sexual assault allegations against him became known, Wu had endorsed Ricardo Arroyo's 2022 campaign for Suffolk County district attorney. However, after the allegations surfaced, Wu and many joined many other prominent politicians in withdrawing her nomination of Arroyo. Wu supported the reelection campaign of Raphael Warnock in the 2022 United States Senate election in Georgia.

Wu campaigned for the effort to get voters to write-in President Joe Biden in the 2024 New Hampshire Democratic presidential primary. She was later in the primary season selected as a delegate to the 2024 Democratic National Convention, being a delegate for Massachusetts at-large. One day after President Biden withdrew his candidacy and Vice President Kamala Harris launched her presidential candidacy with Biden's endorsement, Wu declared her support for Harris and her intention to cast her vote in the convention roll call for Harris.

In the 2024 primary for Suffolk County clerk of courts, Wu endorsed Allison Cartwright.

== Pregnancy ==
In late-July 2024, Wu announced that she was pregnant with a daughter and was due in January 2025. After working that morning, Wu gave birth to her daughter on January 13, 2025, and opted to not take formal maternity leave, adding that the "city runs and our services are ones that people rely on, 24 hours a day, 365 days a week, and I weigh in where I can and where I need to", describing her time as a "working leave". Her newborn daughter has traveled with her to meetings and events as she continued to work as mayor, resulting in Boston magazine giving her daughter an honorable mention in May 2025 on its annual list of the "Most Influential Bostonians", calling Wu's infant daughter the city's "tiniest VIP".

== Recognition ==
In 2022, Wu was honored by Gold House (which honors those of Asian Pacific descent). The organization honored her and fellow mayors Bruce Harrell and Aftab Pureval as having made the "most impact" in the field of advocacy and policy. The Harvard College Class of 2022 selected Wu to be their Class Day speaker. Wu is the first alumnus of Harvard College to be elected mayor of Boston since Malcolm Nichols was elected in 1925. In 2022, Wu received the "Catalyst for Justice Award" from the Massachusetts Public Health Association. The Boston Bar Association gave Wu the "Voice of Change" award at its 2023 Beacon Awards for Diversity, Equity & Inclusion.

Wu has also received recognition honoring her for supporting the arts. In 2023 Mayor Wu received the annual " Champion Award" for her dedication to the arts and education in Massachusetts. That same year, Wu and former acting mayor Janey received the Boston Arts Academy Foundation's "Champion Award".

In 2022, Time magazine recognized Wu in its "Time 100 Next" list of emerging leaders. The article accompanying her entry was authored by Congresswoman Ayanna Pressley. In 2022, Boston magazine ranked Wu at the top of its list of "100 Most Influential Bostonians". In 2023, she was ranked ninth on the magazine's annual power list, which had expanded to list the 150 most influential Bostonians. In 2024, the magazine ranked Wu as second on the list behind only Massachusetts Governor Maura Healey, describing the two as together being the city's "power duo". In 2022, Boston magazine ranked Wu at the top of its list of "100 Most Influential Bostonians". In 2023, she was ranked ninth on the annual list, which had been expanded to now list 150 individuals. In 2024, the magazine ranked Wu as second on the list behind only Governor Healey describing the two as being the city's "power duo". In 2025, she was ranked seventh on the list, with Governor Healey again ranked one spot above her, and with Wu's newborn daughter also being given an honorable-mention with a 151st spot on the list of 150.

== Reputation and public opinion ==
Wu has been regarded to be a popular mayor.

Before 2025, there had been few publicly released polls conducted on Wu's approval and job performance. One of the first was a survey conducted in April 2024 by pollster John Della Volpe. This survey of 600 registered Boston voters (commissioned by The Boston Policy Institute) saw 57% of respondents positively assess Wu's performance as mayor, with 35% assessing her performance negatively. The pollster noted that this and the results of other questions included in the survey showed strong overall favorability of Wu, and also showed support for her policies and the city's handling of the issues that the respondents identified as being most important to them. The pollster also noted that Wu was assessed more positively by respondents than either president Biden and governor Healey.

A February 2025 Emerson College poll (which asked whether Boston voters approved, disapproved, or were neutral in their approval of Wu's job performance) found that 41% (a plurality) approved of Wu's performance as mayor, 21% were neutral, and 38% disapproved. The poll separately asked for respondents' attitudes towards Wu, finding 57% having a favorable view of Wu and 35% having a negative view. When respondents were asked about the direction of the city, 57% found it to be on the "right track", while 43% found it to be on the "wrong track". An April 2025 Saint Anselm College poll of Boston voters found Wu to have a 61% job approval and 37% job disapproval. It also found that 58% had a favorable view of Wu, while 37% had an unfavorable view of her. It also found 46% (a plurality) viewed the city the as being on the "right track" and only 39% viewed it as being on the "wrong track". This was in contrast to strongly negative views expressed in the same poll about the nation's direction, with 79% of respondents and 39% believing it was on the "right track"). While the poll found that voters still found housing, responses to homelessness, and traffic management in the city to be less-than satisfactory, it also found that 70% of were satisfied overall with the city's quality of life (among whom 27% were "very satisfied"). An early September 2025 poll by Emerson College of likely city election voters found 66% approval and 24% disapproval of Wu's performance as mayor. In August 2025, Perry Bacon of The New Republic argued that Wu's first term had demonstrated that it is possible for an elected official to be principled, effective, and popular all at the same time.

Outside of Boston, numerous analysts and left-leaning Democrats have hailed Wu as an example of a progressive who has had a successful tenure as a major city mayor. In a debate ahead the 2025 New York City Democratic mayoral primary, both Zohran Mamdani and Brad Lander named Wu when candidates were asked who they believed was currently the most effective Democratic politician in the United States. During his campaign, Mamdani has repeatedly hailed Wu as a role model for both her performance as mayor and prior work as a city councilor. In June 2025, Benjamin Wallace-Wells of The New Yorker opined that during Wu's first term, her approach to governance (which he characterized as pragmatic) had garnered greater success in office than the less-pragmatic approaches of other recent left-leaning American city officials. Several political analysts have highlighted Wu as providing a model of progressive leadership that Democrats could perhaps duplicate on a broader scale. In September 2025, Bill McKibben of The New Yorker opined that Wu's first term in Boston may have been prime example of a possible trend in which, "Democrats are assembling a new way of governing, not at the federal level but at the municipal one."

== See also ==
- Boston City Council tenure of Michelle Wu
- Other Boston mayoralties:
  - Mayoralty of Raymond Flynn
  - Mayoralty of Thomas Menino
  - Mayoralty of Marty Walsh

== Notes ==
Political offices
Preceded by Marty Walsh (tenure); Kim Janey –acting predecessor	Mayor of Boston, Massachusetts; November 16, 2021 – present	Succeeded by N/A
