= Lisa Wieland =

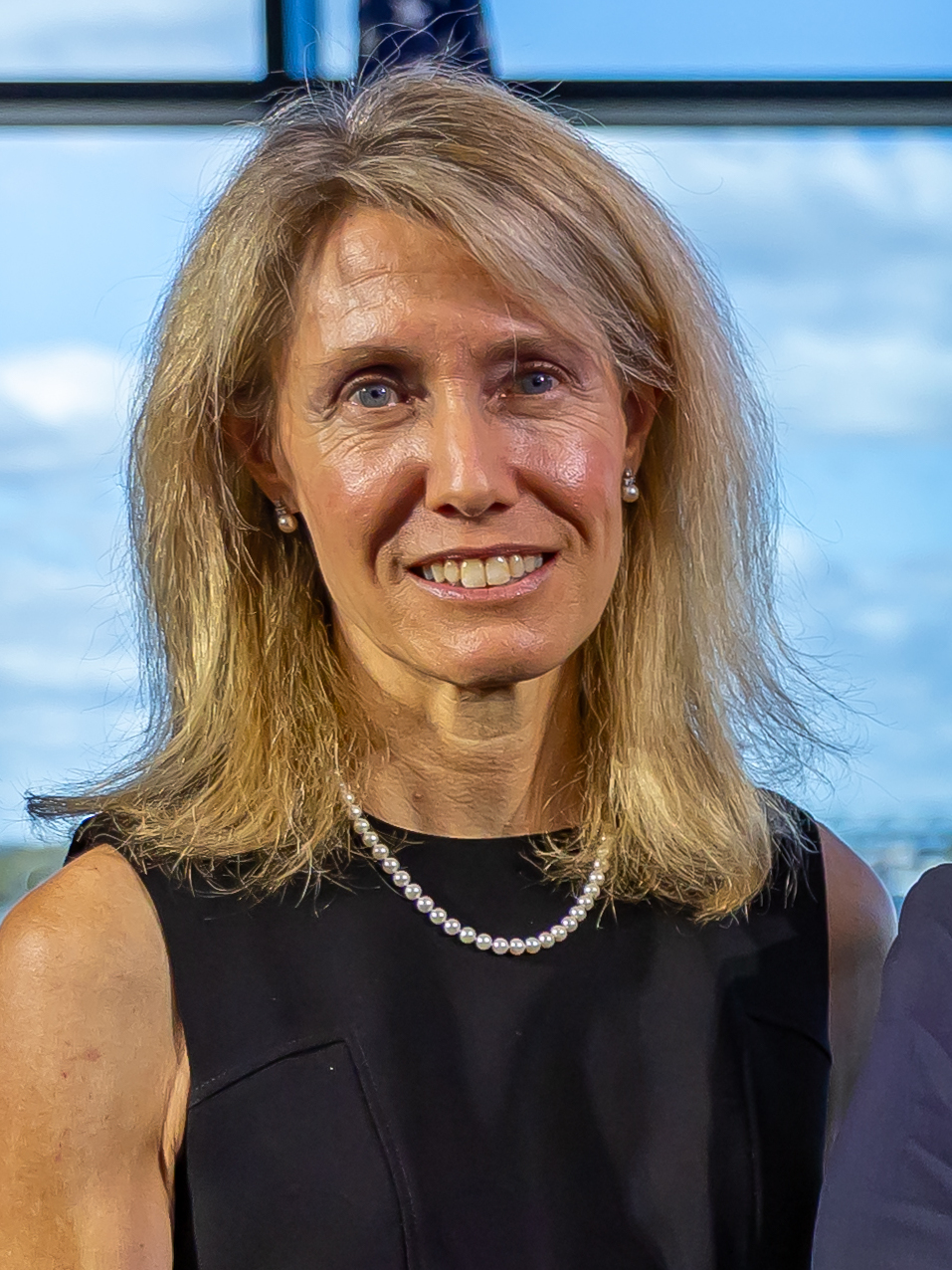
- Wieland in 2023

Massachusetts Port Authority CEO
- In office June 27, 2019 – November 2023
- Preceded by: John Pranckevicius
- Succeeded by: Ed Freni

Director of the Port of Boston
- In office 2015–2019

Member of Maritime System National Advisory Committee, U.S. Department of Transportation
- President: Donald Trump

Personal details
- Education: University of California, Los Angeles; Harvard Business School

Lisa Wieland is the current president of National Grid's New England business and former CEO of the Massachusetts Port Authority.

== Early life and education ==
Wieland obtained her bachelor's degree from the University of California, Los Angeles and went on to get a masters of business administration at Harvard Business School.

== Career ==
Prior to joining Massport, Wieland worked as a consultant at Bain & Company, a management consulting firm, and as an editor for CNN. Weiland is also a member of the U.S. Department of Transportation's Maritime System National Advisory Committee.

=== Massport ===
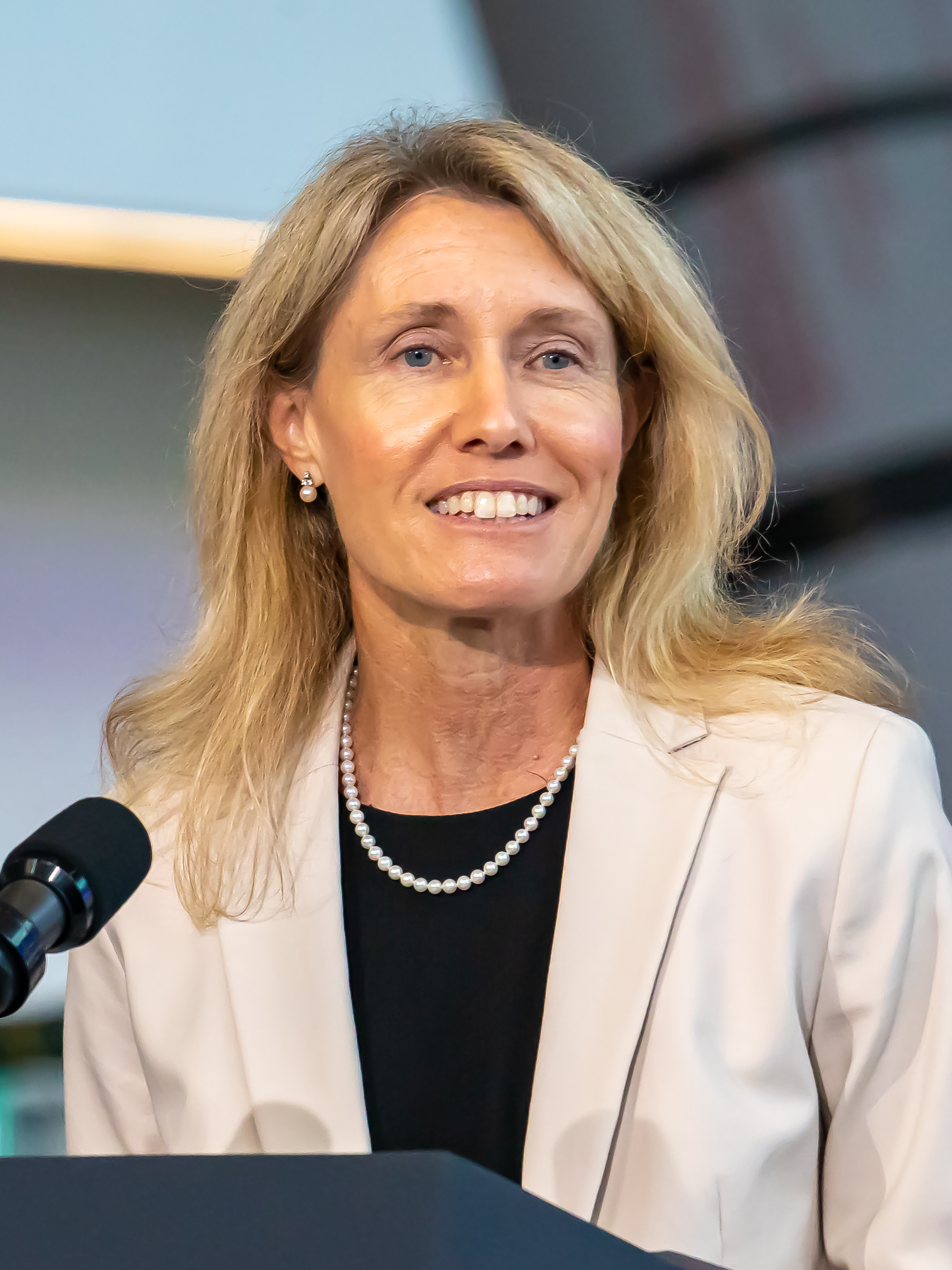
Wieland in 2022

Wieland joined Massport in 2006. In 2013, she was promoted to chief administrative officer for Maritime, and in 2015 became port director for Port of Boston. In 2019, she was appointed CEO of Massport in a process that considered over 100 applicants. She was selected in a five to two vote over Brian P. Golden, the head of the Boston Planning & Development Agency, by Massport's board of directors. Weiland permanently replaced longtime Massport CEO Thomas Glynn.

In January 2019, Wieland was honored with the Pinnacle Award, issued by the Greater Boston Chamber of Commerce, in recognition of her leadership and contributions to the local quality of life while serving at Massport.

Massport announced in 2023 that Weiland would be stepping down from her role as CEO in November of that year. Weieland was replaced by Ed Freni as interim CEO.

=== National Grid ===
In August 2023, National Grid announced that Weiland would succeed Steve Woerner as president their New England business.
