= Peter Meade =

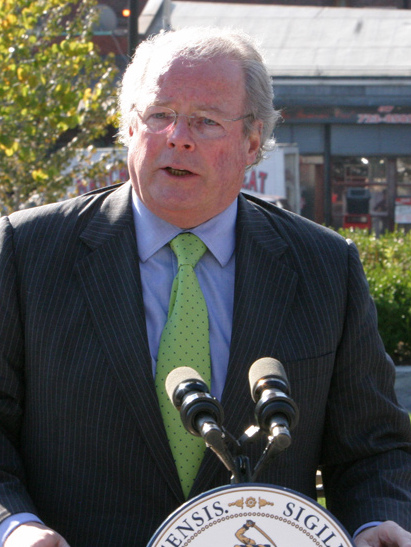
- Meade in 2007

Director of the Boston Redevelopment Authority
- In office 2011–2014
- Mayor: Thomas Menino
- Preceded by: John Palmieri
- Succeeded by: Brian P. Golden

President and CEO of the Edward M. Kennedy Institute for the United States Senate
- In office 2009–2012
- Preceded by: position created
- Succeeded by: Andrew Tarsy

President and CEO of the New England Council
- In office 1992–1996
- Preceded by: Nicholas Koskores
- Succeeded by: James T. Brett

Boston Parks Commissioner
- In office 1976–1977
- Mayor: Kevin White

Head of the Boston Office of Public Service
- In office 1974–1976
- Mayor: Kevin White

Peter G. Meade is an American business executive, government official, and radio host who held various roles in the administration of Boston Mayor Kevin White, hosted a talk show on WBZ radio, and served as president of the Edward M. Kennedy Institute for the United States Senate and the New England Council.

== Early life ==
Meade was raised in Dorchester. His father was a guard at the Charles Street Jail and his mother was a homemaker. He graduated from Cathedral High School and Emerson College.

== Kevin White administration ==
Meade served various roles in the administration of Boston Mayor Kevin White. After starting as director of community schools he was selected to lead the office of public service in 1974. In this role he oversaw the Little City Hall program and was the mayor's chief public safety liaison during the court-mandated desegregation of schools. In 1976 he was named the city's parks commissioner. He resigned in 1977 to run for Massachusetts State Auditor. He lost in the Democratic primary to incumbent auditor Thaddeus M. Buczko 60% to 40%. Following his defeat, Meade was named senior management officer for intergovernmental affairs in the Boston Public Schools. During the 1983 Boston mayoral election, Meade was an advisor to David Finnegan.

== WBZ ==
In 1981, Meade was hired by Warner Amex Cable Communications during a bidding war for Boston's cable television contract. He served as Warner Amex's assistant vice president for New England until 1983, when he began hosting a talk show on WBZ radio. When the station switched to an all-news format in 1992, he and Gary LaPierre became the station's morning anchors.

== Private and non-profit sector ==
In 1992, Meade was named president and chief executive officer of the New England Council, a regional business lobbying group. He remained there until 1996, when became the executive vice president for corporate affairs at Blue Cross Blue Shield of Massachusetts. In 2008 he left Blue Cross to become the managing director of Rasky Baerlein Strategic Communications, a Boston-based public relations and lobbying firm. The following year he became the first-ever president and CEO of the Edward M. Kennedy Institute for the United States Senate.

Meade has also served as chairman of the Rose Fitzgerald Kennedy Greenway Conservancy and as a director of the John F. Kennedy Library Foundation, the Anti-Defamation League of New England, and AAA of Southern New England.

== Boston Redevelopment Authority ==
In 2011, Meade was appointed head of the Boston Redevelopment Authority by mayor Thomas Menino. He retired at the end of Menino's term.

Other offices
Preceded by Position created	President and CEO of the Edward M. Kennedy Institute for the United States Senate; 2009–2012	Succeeded by Andrew Tarsy
Preceded by Nicholas Koskores	President and CEO of the New England Council; 1992–1996	Succeeded by James T. Brett
Political offices
Preceded by John Palmieri	Director of the Boston Redevelopment Authority; 2011–2014	Succeeded by Brian P. Golden
