= Brian P. Golden =

American politician

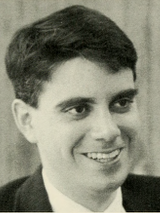
- Official portrait, circa 2003

Director of the Boston Planning & Development Agency
- In office 2014–2022
- Preceded by: Peter Meade
- Succeeded by: James Arthur Jemison II

Member of the Massachusetts House of Representatives from the 18th Suffolk District
- In office 1999–2004
- Preceded by: Steven Tolman
- Succeeded by: Michael Moran

Personal details
- Born: February 2, 1965 (age 61) Boston, Massachusetts, U.S.
- Party: Democratic
- Education: Harvard University; College of William & Mary
- Occupation: Attorney; Politician

Brian Paul Golden (born February 2, 1965) is an American politician and attorney who served as a member of the Massachusetts House of Representatives from 1999 to 2004 and was the director of the Boston Planning & Development Agency from 2014 to 2022.

== Early life ==
Golden was born on February 2, 1965, in Boston. Golden is the son of a career police officer and civic leader. He was raised in the Allston neighborhood of Boston and he has one brother and two sisters. He graduated from Boston Latin School, Harvard College, William & Mary Law School and the US Army War College, master's degree in Strategic Studies. He served in the United States Army from 1993 to 1996 and has been in the United States Army Reserve since 1997. His position in the Army was with the JAG Corps. His military awards include the Bronze Star Medal for service in Iraq and the Defense Meritorious Service Medal for service in Jerusalem and the West Bank.

== Political career ==
In 1990, Golden was an unsuccessful candidate for the Massachusetts House of Representatives seat in Boston's 19th Suffolk district. He finished second in a four-candidate Democratic primary behind Susan Tracy and ahead of Steven Tolman and John J. McLaughlin. After returning to law school and serving in the US Army for more than three years, he was elected to the House in 1998. From 1999 to 2005, he represented Boston’s 18th Suffolk district. His career in the state legislature was interrupted twice when he was deployed into war zones. In 2001, he was deployed to Bosnia and then deployed to Iraq in 2005.

The Democratic caucus in the Massachusetts legislature was split on the issue at the time, while Democratic President Barack Obama opposed same sex marriage until 2012. In the legislature, Golden played a key role in defeating an attempt to restore the death penalty in 1999 at a time when the legislature was closely divided on the matter. He was an advocate for public charter schools as an alternative to poorly performing traditional public school systems. He also served as Co-Chair of the Special Commission on School Building Assistance, which worked to improve state law governing the funding for public school construction. In 2005, Golden was appointed commissioner of the Department of Telecommunications and Energy by Republican Governor Mitt Romney. He also served as New England's Regional Director for the Department of Health and Human Services, where he worked with states on federal Medicaid waivers to expand health insurance coverage.

In 2009, Golden became the Executive Director/Secretary for the Boston Redevelopment Authority when he was appointed by Democratic Mayor Thomas M. Menino. In 2014, newly elected Democratic Mayor Martin J. Walsh, appointed Golden head of the Boston Redevelopment Authority” (later renamed the Boston Planning & Development Agency) when Peter Meade departed. His focus at the agency was to modernize operations, improve transparency, provide neighborhoods with more input into city planning and development decisions, and support economic development. In 2019, he was a finalist for CEO of the Massachusetts Port Authority. Boston Port Director Lisa Wieland was chosen over Golden by a 5 to 2 vote. In 2020, Golden announced the creation of the BPDA's first-ever Office of Diversity, Equity, and Inclusion (ODEI).

Golden left the BPDA in 2022. His eight-year tenure as Director was the longest in the agency's history. During his tenure, the BPDA approved some 11,000 new income-restricted affordable residential units and a total of 46,000 new units. He oversaw an historic building boom with 90 million square feet of new development permitted, which was valued at approximately $43 billion. New construction during his tenure yielded more than $300 million in new property taxes. The approved projects from this period were expected to yield, in total, 90,000 construction jobs and 80,000 permanent jobs. As chief executive of the agency, Golden was responsible for city planning and 20 million square feet of agency-owned property, primarily located at the Charlestown Navy Yard and Raymond L. Flynn Marine Park. During his tenure Boston completed the first general city plan since 1965, Imagine Boston 2030, and conducted specific planning exercises for 30% of the city’s land mass. Golden initiated Boston’s candidacy for Singapore’s Lee Kuan Yew (LKY) World City Prize when the international competition kicked off in 2019. In 2022, Boston was one of four cities to be recognized by the LKY Prize, receiving a Special Mention. Boston was the only city in the United States to be singled out. The Prize Council saluted Boston for its “holistic and cumulative effort on climate resilience, improving housing affordability and mobility options, and fostering civic participation.”

Golden was also Commissioner at the Massachusetts Department of Telecommunications and Energy and a Non-Executive Director at the Federal Home Loan Bank of Boston.

== Military career ==
Golden received a commission in the Army Judge Advocate General’s Corps in 1993. He served at Walter Reed Army Medical Center, the Sierra Army Depot, and with III Corps at Ft. Cavazos (formerly Ft. Hood). After returning to Boston, he was elected to the legislature in 1998. His service in the state legislature was interrupted twice when he returned to active military duty. He deployed to Bosnia-Herzegovina with the NATO peacekeeping mission in late 2001, and he was mobilized to the Pentagon in 2003, just as the war in Iraq began. In 2005, shortly after resigning his House seat, he was deployed to Iraq, where he worked on reforming detention operations in the wake of the Abu Ghraib detainee abuse scandal. In 2013, Golden was deployed by the Army to Jerusalem and the West Bank where he performed duty with the US Security Coordinator for Israel and the Palestinian Authority (USSC). He is the recipient of the Bronze Star Medal and the Defense Meritorious Service Medal. He served in multiple assignments at the Pentagon, and retired from the US Army Reserve, with the rank of Colonel, in October 2023.
