= Boston Planning & Development Agency =

Municipal planning and development agency for Boston

Coordinates: 42°21′37.16″N 71°3′28.68″W

Boston Planning and Development Agency
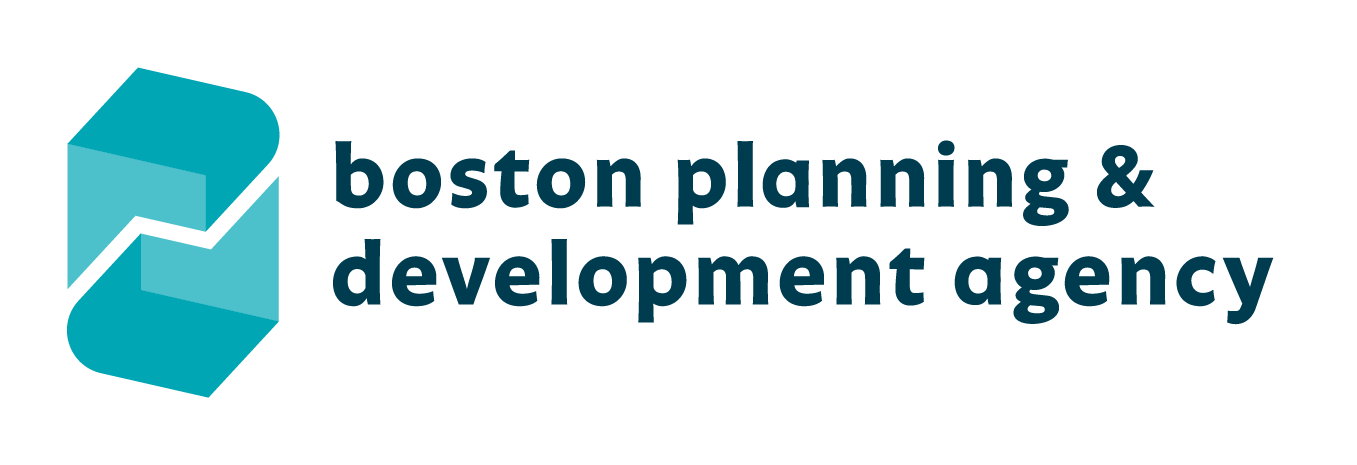
- Logo as of 2019

Agency overview
- Formed: 1957; 69 years ago
- Type: Urban planning agency
- Headquarters: Boston City Hall 1 City Hall Square #9, Boston, MA
- Agency executive: Kairos Shen, Chief of Planning and Director
- Website: www.bostonplans.org

The Boston Planning & Development Agency (BPDA), formerly the Boston Redevelopment Authority (BRA), is a Massachusetts public agency that serves as the municipal planning and development agency for Boston, working on both housing and commercial developments.

As an agency concerned with urban planning, the BPDA does not consider requests for zoning variances from individual property owners. These are heard by the city's own Zoning Board of Appeals, a seven-person body appointed by the Mayor of Boston.

Some consider the BPDA's roles as both real estate owner and developer, and approval authority over private development projects, to be a conflict of interest.

== Projects ==
One of the first projects the BRA took on was the demolition of the West End of Boston, in an infamous urban renewal project that generated a considerable negative reaction locally and across the country. At the same time, nineteenth-century buildings around Scollay Square were demolished to make way for the new Government Center. Many consider the finished project (which includes Boston City Hall) an eyesore, and the surrounding large brick plaza as an uncomfortable place to be. Another urban renewal project was the Prudential Tower development over the Boston and Albany Railroad right-of-way in Back Bay; as part of this project, Mechanics Hall on Huntington Avenue was taken by the city using eminent domain and demolished in 1959.

The BRA also collaborated with the Massachusetts Turnpike Authority and Rose Kennedy Greenway Conservancy on various development projects such as the Rose Kennedy Greenway, which was developed atop the Big Dig. The BRA owns real estate throughout the city and together with community participation through planning initiatives, issues Requests for Proposals as part of the land disposition process in order to achieve neighborhood-based community development goals. Another example of the BRA's work involves collaboration with the State Coastal Zone Management Department for waterfront planning and redevelopment of privately owned and MassPort-owned properties. An example of municipal harbor planning involves the "East Boston Municipal Harbor Plan" where properties of varied ownership along the waterfront are currently being developed and Fort Point Channel development.

The BRA has also undertaken improvements on Columbia Road in Dorchester, a narrow stretch of green space that Frederick Law Olmsted once envisioned as The Dorchesterway, the final link in the Emerald Necklace park system.

== History ==
Officially a "public body politic and corporate," the BRA was established by the Massachusetts General Court and the Boston City Council in 1957, superseding the authority of the Boston Housing Authority. Its primary goal is to work with Boston businesses and developers in order to provide direction for development in the city of Boston.

Its statutory authority was set forth in the Massachusetts General Laws chapter 121B, section 4, and amended by the Session Laws of 1960, chapter 652, section 12. The agency's redevelopment authority includes the jurisdiction to buy and sell real estate, acquire real estate through eminent domain, and grant tax concessions to encourage commercial and residential development.

On September 27, 2016, Boston Mayor Marty Walsh changed the name of the development agency from the Boston Redevelopment Authority (BRA) to the Boston Planning and Development Agency (BPDA). This change was part of a broader goal to make city government more transparent and to put a friendlier face to a bureaucratic agency that rules upon major construction in the city.

Michelle Wu promised during her successful mayoral campaign to abolish the BPDA. In February 2022, she asked the city council to terminate some of the agency's planning urban renewal districts.

== Directors of the BRA ==
- Kane Simonian (1957–1960)
- Edward J. Logue (1960–1967)
- Francis X. Cuddy (1967–1968)
- Hale Champion (1968–1969)
- John D. Warner (1969–1971)
- Robert T. Kenney (1971–1977)
- Robert F. Walsh (1977–1978)
- Robert J. Ryan (1978–1984)
- Stephen Coyle (1984–1992)
- Paul L. Barrett (1992–1994)
- Marisa Lago (1994–1997)
- Thomas N. O'Brien (1997–1999)
- Mark Maloney (2000–2007)
- John F. Palmieri (2007–2011)
- Peter Meade (2011–2014)
- Brian P. Golden (2014–2022)
- James Arthur Jemison II (2022–2024)
- Kairos Shen (2024–present)
