= Bayside Expo Center =

Convention center located in Dorchester, Massachusetts

- Interactive map of Bayside Expo Center
- Former names: Bayside Mall
- Address: 200 Mt Vernon St,
- Location: Dorchester, Boston, Massachusetts 02125, United States
- Coordinates: 42°19′18.07″N 71°2′48.95″W
- Owner: University of Massachusetts Boston
- Public transit: JFK/UMass on the MBTA Red Line

Construction
- Built: 1965 (as Bayside Mall)
- Opened: 1983
- Closed: 1973 (as Bayside Mall) 2010 (as Bayside Expo Center)
- Demolished: 2016

Bayside Expo Center (also known as the Bayside Expo and Conference Center) was a convention center located in Dorchester, Massachusetts. Originally opened as a shopping mall called Bayside Mall in the 1960s, the mall later failed and the convention center opened in its place. In 2010, it was purchased by the University of Massachusetts Boston after the building went into foreclosure. After the building's roof collapsed from the weight of accumulated snowfall during the 2014–15 North American winter, the university demolished the facility in 2016. In 2019, the University of Massachusetts board of trustees leased the property to Accordia Partners. In 2020, Accordia Partners proposed redeveloping the property into a 21-building mixed-used biotechnology science park called "Dorchester Bay City". In 2023, the Boston Planning & Development Agency approved the Accordia Partners proposal.

== History ==
Bayside Mall was built in 1967 by Family City Development. Originally featuring Zayre, Almy's, Woolworth, and Stop & Shop as its major tenants. The center suffered greatly from high crime and poor sales among its stores, causing Almy's and many of the other stores to close in 1972, and the rest to close in 1973. A $15 million development plan launched in 1982 began converting the property to Bayside Expo Center. Bayside Expo Center officially opened for business in January 1983.

In January 2008, Boston Mayor Thomas Menino appointed a 15-member task force to develop a 25-year master plan for the Columbia Point neighborhood with the Boston Redevelopment Authority (BRA). In January 2009, the BRA held public meetings for the Columbia Point master plan.

== UMass Boston acquisition ==
UMass Boston acquired the Bayside Expo Center property in 2010. In June 2011, the BRA approved the 25-year master plan for Columbia Point with the support of the Columbia-Savin Hill Civic Association. In 2015, the center had been proposed as the site for the Olympic Village as part of the Boston bid for the 2024 Summer Olympics, which was ultimately cancelled. In March 2015, part of the roof of the building collapsed under the weight of snow during Boston's record-setting snowfall during the 2014–15 North American winter. In April 2016, demolition of the building began in order to expand the parking area, to build new pedestrian walkways connecting Mount Vernon Street with the Dorchester Shores Reservation and the Boston Harborwalk, and to improve the lighting, landscaping, bike racks, and security.

In June 2016, UMass officials and the Kraft Group had discussed constructing a stadium for the New England Revolution at the Bayside site, which was cancelled the following April. In September 2016, Boston Mayor Marty Walsh announced that the Boston Redevelopment Authority would be renamed as the Boston Planning & Development Agency (BPDA) at a meeting with the Greater Boston Chamber of Commerce. In January 2018, the UMass System put the property up for sale, with initial estimates indicating that the university could receive $200 million or more from such a sale. In May 2018, the U.S. Treasury Department approved a request submitted by Massachusetts Governor Charlie Baker at the recommendation of the Walsh administration that the Columbia Point census tract, which includes the Bayside Expo Center, be designated as an opportunity zone under the Tax Cuts and Jobs Act of 2017. In October 2018, Mayor Walsh announced a comprehensive climate change adaptation proposal to protect the Boston Harbor coastline from flooding.

In March 2023, after a metal panel fell from the out-of-use Bayside Expo Center sign, the University of Massachusetts Building Authority (UMBA) commissioned an engineering review of its safety and structural integrity by Simpson Gumpertz & Heger (SGH) and a removal of the sign's remaining panels (after a 2016 engineering review commissioned by the UMBA from SGH found the sign to be safe and secure under the state's building code), and the sign atop the structure was removed and lowered to the parking lot below the next month while the structure's legs remained.

== Bay City development ==
In February 2019, the UMass Board of Trustees unanimously approved a 99-year final lease agreement for the Bayside Expo Center with Accordia Partners for approximately $192 million to $235 million. In June 2019, Accordia Partners acquired five buildings at 2 Morrissey Boulevard across the street from the Bayside property, and at a Columbia-Savin Hill Civic Association meeting in September 2019 with Boston City Councilor Frank Baker in attendance, announced a series of public meetings to formulate a proposal to redevelop the Bayside property beginning the following month. In March 2020, Accordia Partners filed a 3-page letter of intent with the BPDA.

In June 2020, the BPDA announced that it was seeking nominations for a community advisory committee to jointly review the Accordia Partners Bayside proposal and the Center Court Partners revised redevelopment proposal filed with the BPDA the previous January for the former WLVI television station at 75 Morrissey. In September 2020, Accordia Partners filed a 187-page project notification form with the BPDA for a mixed-use development titled "Dorchester Bay City" on 34 acres of land that will total 5.9 million square feet of gross floor area laid out over 17 city blocks, and will feature commercial and public space as well as 1,740 residential housing units. In October 2020, a 25-person community advisory committee held the first of six meetings scheduled through the following December to review the Bay City development proposal, and in the same month, the Walsh administration released a 174-page climate change adaptation report for the Boston Harbor coastline in Dorchester with a section on Columbia Point and Morrissey Boulevard.

In November 2020, the BPDA hosted a pair of virtual public meetings to review the urban design elements, the transportation implications, and the infrastructure specifics of the Bay City development. In March 2021, the Baker and Walsh administrations announced a joint $1 million infrastructure study to improve the Morrissey Boulevard corridor and Kosciuszko Circle, as well as to identify improvements related to the Bay City development (which Accordia Partners has indicated that it plans to make a $26.7 million commitment to with $17.7 million reserved for constructing a new layout of Mount Vernon Street). In July 2021, Accordia Partners made a $10 million commitment in matching funds to the Massachusetts Affordable Housing Alliance to assist nearby first-generation homebuyers in making down payments, while the Morrissey Boulevard-Kosciuszko Circle study received its funding from the Massachusetts Department of Transportation and the BPDA. In December 2021, Accordia Partners filed a draft project impact report that included an agreement with the Boston Teachers Union for 2 acres of land adjacent to the Bayside property where their current headquarters is located that will be included in the Bay City development.

In February 2022, UMass Boston faculty members met with members of the Columbia-Savin Hill Civic Association at its monthly meeting to discuss mutual concerns about the Bay City development related to its potential traffic increase, its environmental impact, its planning process, and the amount of affordable housing units in the development (despite the ratio of affordable housing units in the official proposal exceeding city government requirements), and mutually agreed to express their concerns explicitly to Boston Mayor Michelle Wu and the Boston City Council. In the same month, the BPDA extended a public comment window for the project for another month, Accordia Partners executives stated at a public meeting that the 36-acre development will be LEED Gold, will include about 15 acres of green space and plazas with over 4,000 bicycle storage spaces (after stating at a public meeting the previous month that the development would only include 2,865 parking spaces of 3,600 allowed), will plant 1,000 trees, will dedicate 20 percent of non-research and development roof space to solar power production, and will dedicate 75 percent of its coastal boardwalk development (planned for 4.2 feet of sea level rise) to pedestrian and bike usage only, while community activists at the meeting called for the ratio of affordable housing units in the development to be increased in line with a proposal by the Wu administration to increase affordable housing requirements in city residential projects to 20 percent.

On the 100-days mark of her tenure in office, Mayor Wu cited the Bay City development proposal as highlighting interconnectedness of concerns about climate change, housing affordability, and the design of public spaces. In March 2022, the Dorchester Reporter published an op-ed co-authored by former interim UMass Boston Chancellor Katherine Newman in support of the Bay City development as an effort to increase representation of racial minorities in the Greater Boston biotechnology industry by creating a science park in proximity to UMass Boston (a research university with a majority-minority enrollment), noting that comparable development around the Georgia Tech main campus in Midtown Atlanta led to a $1 billion increase in sponsored research. According to the UMass Boston Office of Institutional Research, Assessment, and Planning, 69 percent of the 3,215 non-international students enrolled in the university's College of Science and Mathematics during the 2021–2022 academic year were nonwhite, biology was the second most popular undergraduate major at the university (after business management) with 1,336 students, and of the non-international students enrolled in the university's undergraduate biology program (or of the 1,276 students of the 1,336 enrolled), 71 percent were nonwhite while 72 percent of all students in the program were female.

In April 2022, a UMass Boston faculty member, academic department coordinator, and graduate student co-wrote an op-ed proposing a 6-month extension to the BPDA's Article 80 review process and the creation of a community benefits agreement for the Bay City development, reiterating previous concerns about the amount of affordable housing in the development, the development potentially increasing housing rents in Columbia Point, and furthering gentrification in the neighborhood. In May 2022, a community group formed by resident activists delivered a petition with more than 700 signatures to Mayor Wu's office at Boston City Hall supporting a 6-month extension to the BPDA review process while Accordia executives issued a press statement reiterating various community benefit commitments the company agreed to make during the public consultation process over the previous three years. In August 2022, Governor Baker signed into law an $11 billion transportation infrastructure bond bill that included $250,000 for improvements to the tide gates at Patten's Cove and that established a commission scheduled to assemble later in the same year and issue a report with findings and recommendations to improve the Morrissey Boulevard corridor and Kosciuszko Circle by June 1, 2023 (and that will include multiple state agency executives, the Mayor of Boston, state and local legislators, or their designees).

As of August 2023, the report's release had been delayed until mid-2024. In December 2022, Accordia Partners filed a revised proposal with the BPDA that reduced the amount of floor space by 350,000 square feet, increased the amount of green and open space to 20 acres, and increased the ratio of affordable housing units to 20 percent, while on the same day the revised proposal was filed, Accordia executives met with the planning committee of the Columbia-Savin Hill Civic Association and stated in interviews with the Dorchester Reporter that they hoped to receive BPDA approval for the project by the following summer. In January 2023, Accordia executives met with the Morrissey community advisory committee to discuss the revised proposal (ahead of public meetings hosted by the BPDA to discuss the revisions) where the committee members praised the modifications, while Accordia executives proposed replacing the Kosciusko Circle rotary with a four-way interchange at one of the public meetings hosted by the BPDA the next month.

Ahead of a public meeting for the Bay City proposal in April 2023, U.S. Representative Stephen F. Lynch from Massachusetts's 8th congressional district, Massachusetts State Representatives Daniel J. Hunt and David Biele, the Black Economic Council of Massachusetts, and Boston College High School President Grace Cotter Regan wrote letters to the BPDA in support of the proposal. In July 2023, the proposal received the approval of the Boston Civic Design Commission, while the BPDA hosted a virtual meeting for the proposal where the BPDA announced that it would table consideration of the proposal until a BPDA board meeting the following September. In August 2023, the Dorchester Reporter published an op-ed by co-written by Martin Richard Foundation founder Bill Richard and Boys & Girls Clubs of Dorchester President and CEO Bob Scannell in support of the proposal which stated that it was aligned with the aims of the joint project between their organizations to construct a field house on Mount Vernon Street. In September 2023, the BPDA board approved Accordia's final master plan for the Bay City proposal.
