= Morrissey Boulevard =

Coastal road in Boston, Massachusetts

Coordinates: 42°18′2.5″N 71°2′57.6″W

William T. Morrissey Boulevard
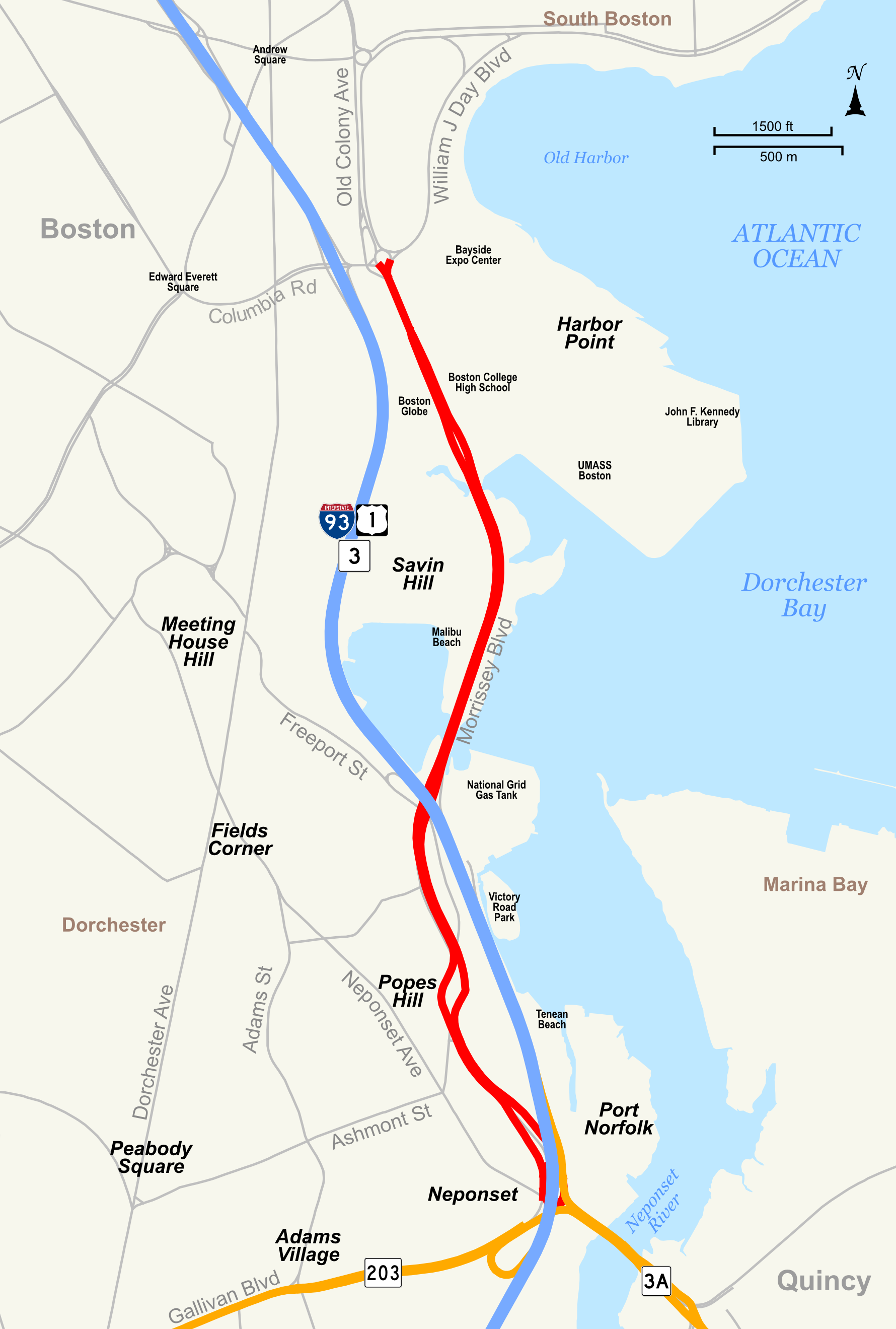
- Morrissey Boulevard highlighted in red
- Interactive map of William T. Morrissey Boulevard
- Maintained by: Department of Conservation and Recreation
- Length: 2.71 mi (4.36 km)
- Location: Boston, Massachusetts
- South end: Route 3A / Route 203 (Neponset Circle)
- North end: Kosciuszko Circle

Construction
- Completion: 1924

Morrissey Boulevard is a six-lane divided coastal road in the Dorchester neighborhood of Boston, Massachusetts, United States. It is owned and maintained by the Massachusetts Department of Conservation and Recreation (DCR).

== Route description ==
A parkway, Morrissey Boulevard leaves Neponset Circle at its northeast quadrant as the left two lanes of a three lane exit, with the rightmost lane splitting to the east as an entrance ramp to the Southeast Expressway (Interstate 93). Traveling under the expressway within a landscaped park area fronting the DCR-operated Devine Memorial ice rink, the road then travels north through the Neponset and Popes Hill sections of Dorchester with commercial establishments on both sides. The road splits as it passes under the tracks of the MBTA Red Line rapid transit route at what was previously Popes Hill Station of the Old Colony Railroad. A Dunkin' Donuts store now occupies the area between the two roadways. The entrance to Tenean Beach, part of the DCR's Dorchester Shores Reservation, is located off the right roadway in this section.

Morrissey Boulevard proceeds north past the Richard J. Murphy Elementary School and is flanked by heavy commercial development over the following 0.5 miles (0.80 km) to Freeport Street. At Freeport, the road again passes beneath the expressway and travels to the east of it from that point to the end of the boulevard. As a northbound exit ramp from the expressway enters on the right, the view east is dominated by a 140-foot (43 m) LNG storage tank which is painted with Rainbow Swash, an iconic work by Corita Kent that has made the gas tank a Boston landmark. The parkway passes over the inlet from Dorchester Bay to Savin Hill Bay carried by the John J. Beades Memorial Bridge, a drawbridge which opens to allow passage to Dorchester Yacht Club. Savin Hill Beach, Malibu Beach, Savin Hill Yacht Club and the Vietnam Veterans Memorial of Dorchester are located along Morrissey Boulevard in this area adjacent to Savin Hill and featured as part of Boston Harborwalk.

The University of Massachusetts Boston, Boston College High School, and the John F. Kennedy Presidential Library and Museum are among the institutions located on Morrissey Boulevard in its northernmost stretch beyond Savin Hill. The road ends as it intersects Columbia Road and Day Boulevard at Kosciuszko Circle, adjacent to the Columbia Point section of Dorchester and JFK/UMass subway and commuter rail station.

== History ==
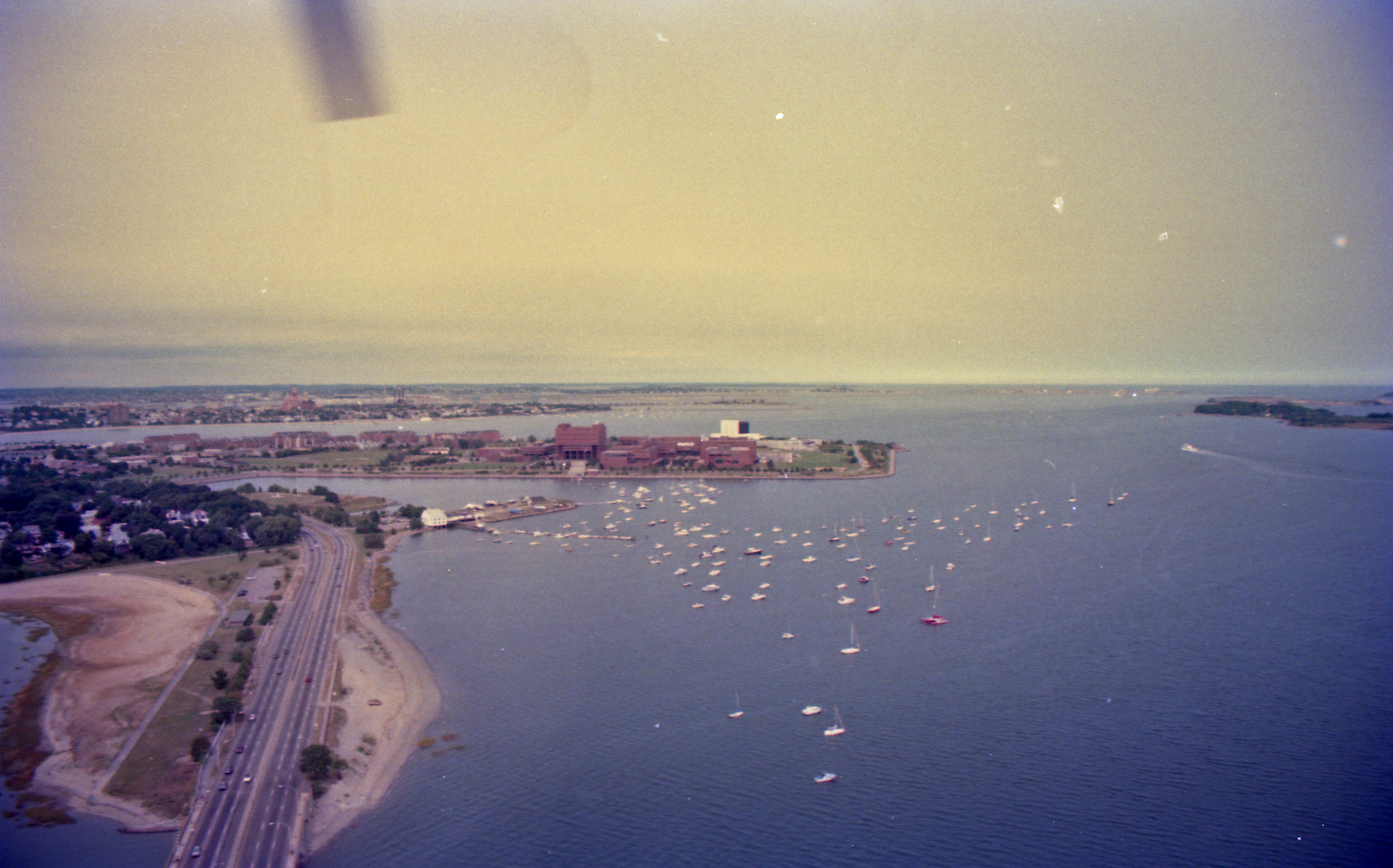
Aerial view of Morrissey Boulevard and UMass Boston in September 1993.

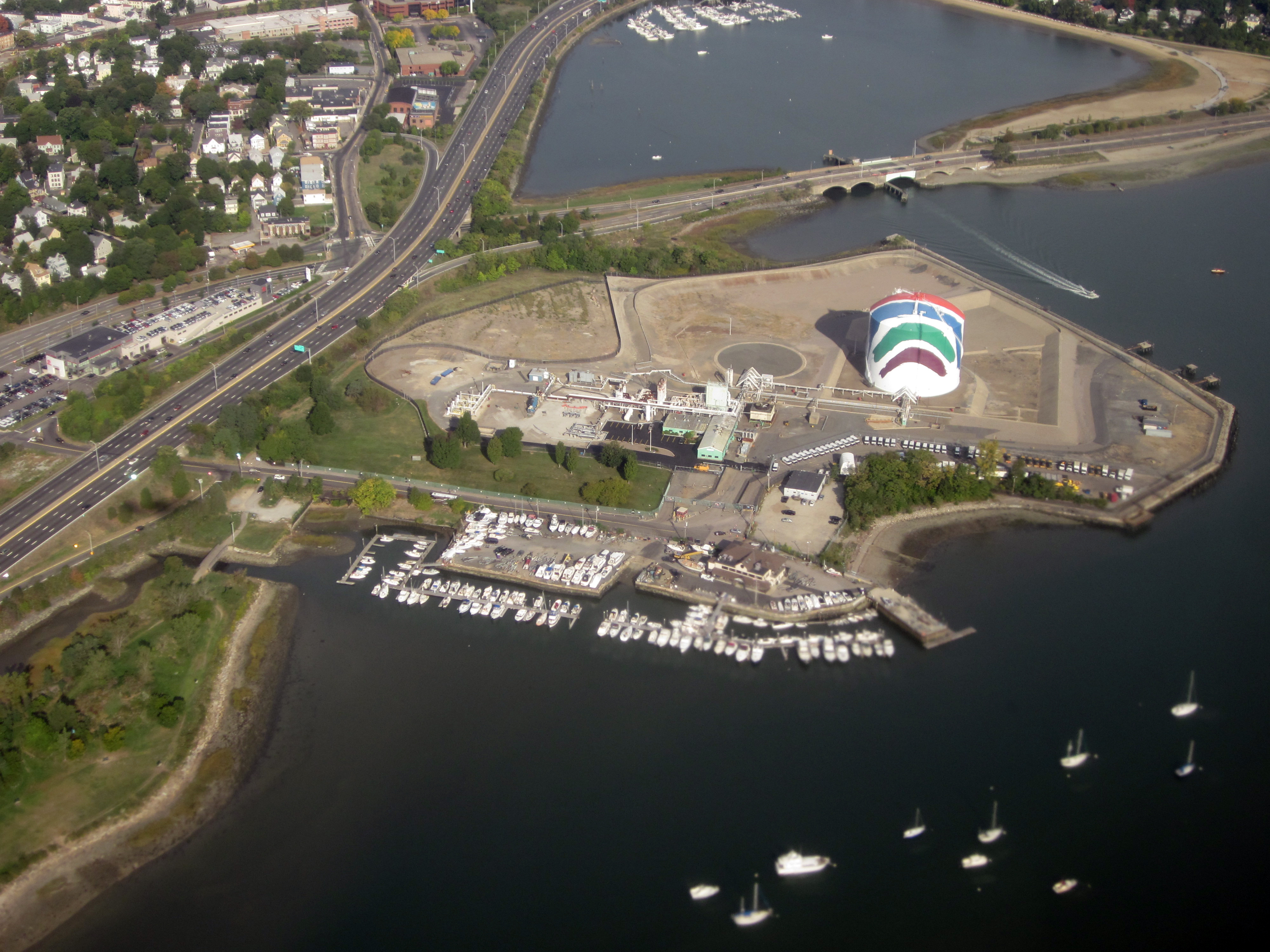
Aerial view of the National Grid gas tank, the I-93/US-1/MA-3 concurrency, and Morrissey Boulevard with the Beades Bridge visible in September 2010.

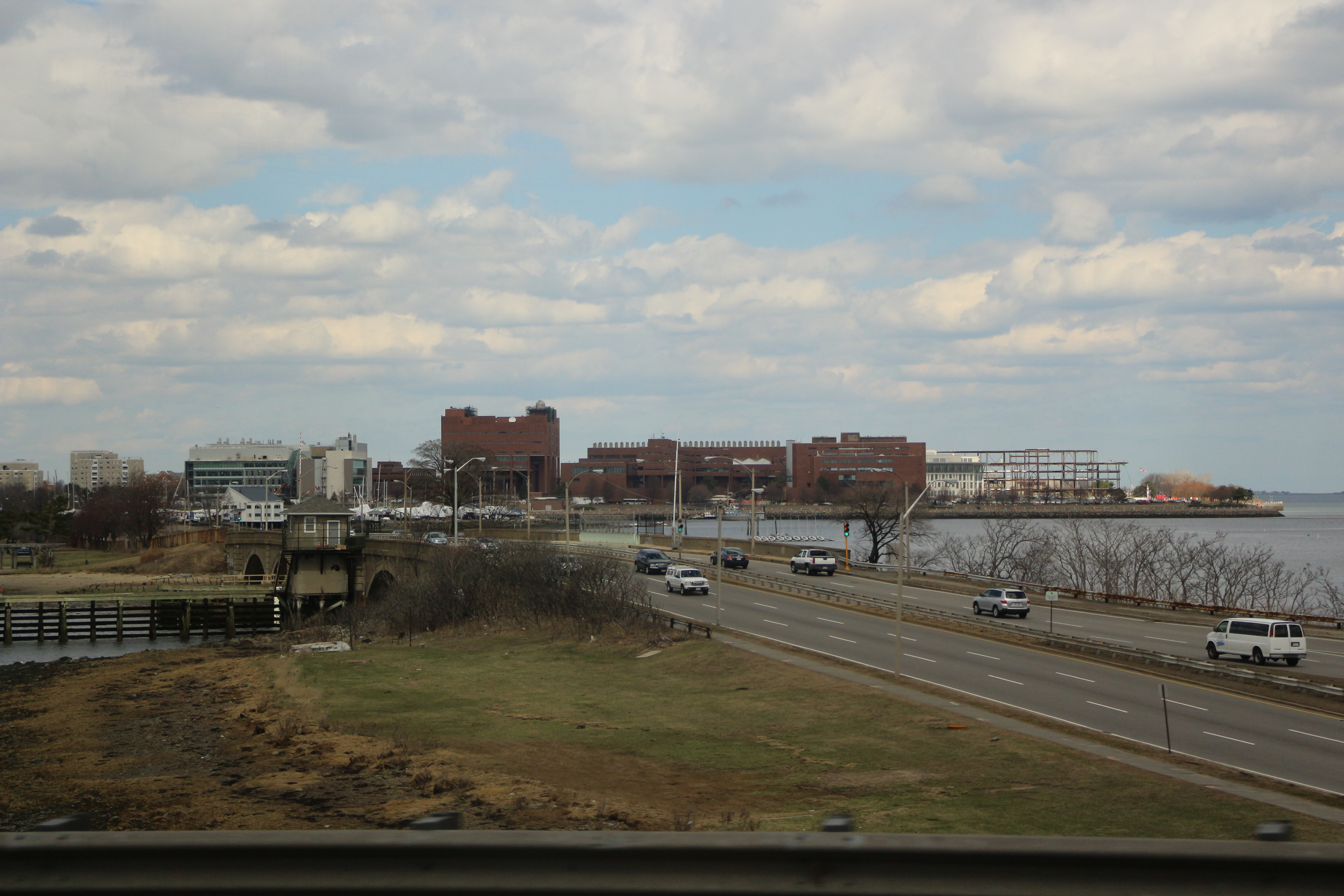
Morrissey Boulevard and UMass Boston from the highway concurrency in Dorchester in April 2014.

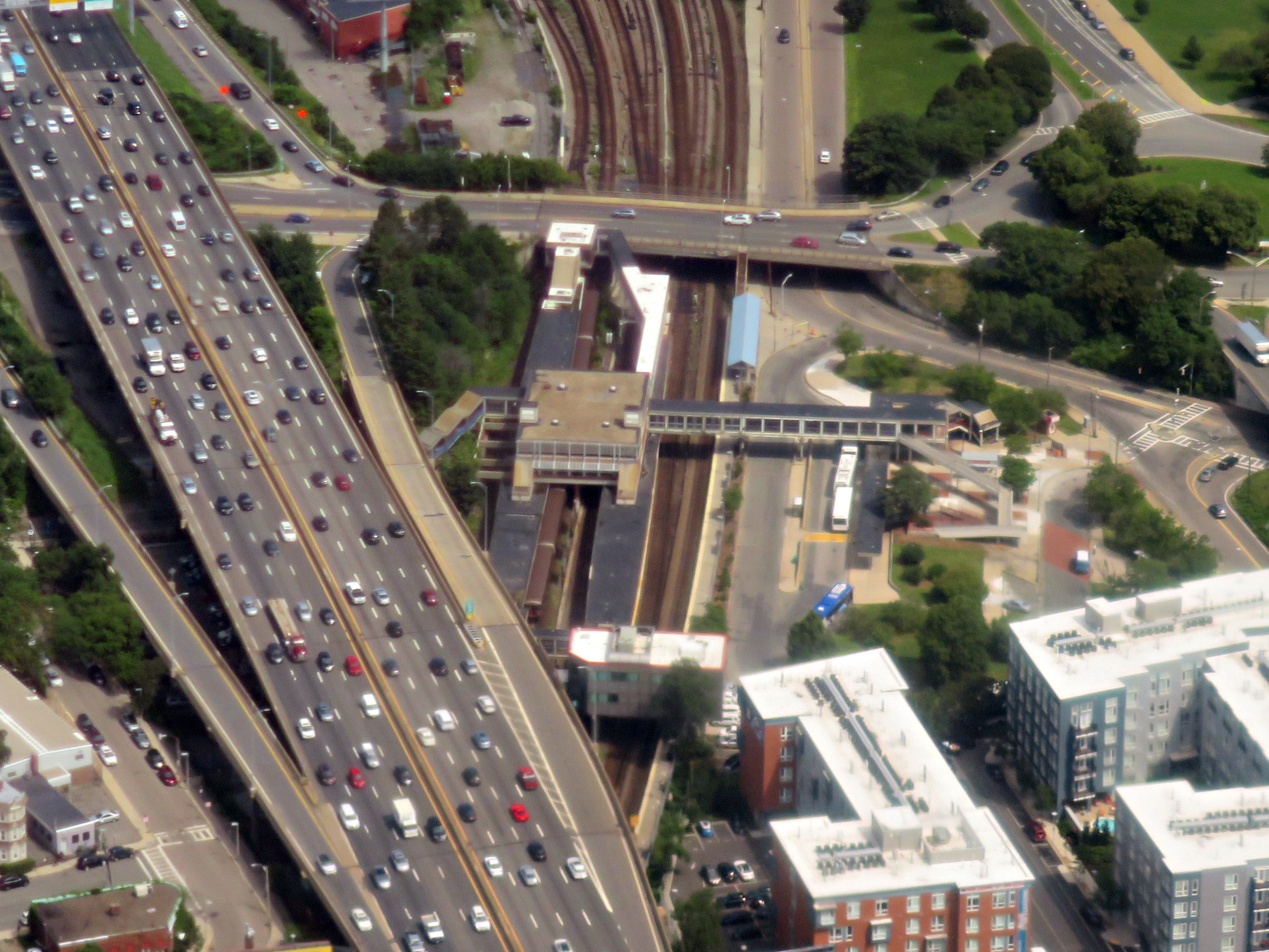
Aerial view of the JFK/UMass station in July 2019 with Morrissey Boulevard's intersections with Old Colony Avenue and Mount Vernon Street and with Kosciuszko Circle visible in top right.

The road was designed as early as 1906 as an urban parkway to be constructed along the route of the Old Colony Railroad to give travelers to Quincy and Massachusetts South Shore locations a way to bypass city streets. In planning for nearly two decades, it was finally completed in 1924 and named Old Colony Parkway. The originally proposed route paralleling the railroad was changed and moved to the shore of Dorchester Bay on the Atlantic Ocean due in part to land reclamation efforts prior to completion of the road. Old Colony Parkway was renamed William T. Morrissey Boulevard in 1951 in honor of the former head of the Metropolitan District Commission (MDC), now the Massachusetts Department of Conservation and Recreation (DCR). The older commission constructed many parkways within Greater Boston and the DCR continues to own and maintain Morrissey Boulevard.

=== Flooding ===
It is becoming known for high tide flooding. The thoroughfare was flooded during the January 2018 North American blizzard, the first March 2018 nor'easter, and during the January 2019 North American winter storm. In September 2020, the thoroughfare was flooded during the passage of Hurricane Teddy, while a king tide caused Morrissey Boulevard to become flooded in November 2020, and the thoroughfare was flooded during the second December 2020 nor'easter. The thoroughfare was flooded during the 2021 Groundhog Day nor'easter. In July 2021, the National Oceanic and Atmospheric Administration (NOAA) released a report estimating that Boston would experience 11 to 18 days of high tide flooding in the following year. The thoroughfare was flooded during the January 2022 North American blizzard and the December 2022 North American winter storm. In January 2024, another king tide caused Morrissey Boulevard to become flooded.

In October 2018, Boston Mayor Marty Walsh announced a comprehensive climate change adaptation proposal to protect the Boston Harbor coastline from flooding that included a proposal to re-design Morrissey Boulevard, and in October 2020, the Walsh administration released a 174-page climate change adaptation report for the Boston Harbor coastline in Dorchester that included proposals to elevate Morrissey Boulevard to as high as 16 feet NAVD 88 and install tide gates and berms with cost estimates ranging from $55.6 million to $90.9 million. In December 2024, the DCR announced that it was planning to install a new pump station along the Neponset Greenway extension to reduce flooding along Morrissey that it estimated would cost $3 million.

=== Harborwalk-Neponset connection ===
In February 2022, Massachusetts Governor Charlie Baker announced an $8.2 million project to construct a 0.7-mile shared-use path from Tenean Beach on the Neponset River Reservation to Morrissey Boulevard and that will connect the Lower Neponset River Trail with the Boston Harborwalk via Morrissey (including a 670-foot boardwalk in the salt marshes near the National Grid gas tank) would be included in the $9.5 billion in federal funds the state government received under the Infrastructure Investment and Jobs Act. In November 2022, the Michaels Organization announced an agreement with state officials for maintenance of the Morrissey-Neponset walking trail connection at a virtual public meeting for a proposal to redevelop the Ramada hotel property at 800 Morrissey into housing. In May 2023, the route for the Morrissey-Neponset walking trail connection was in the process of being cleared by Massachusetts Department of Transportation (MassDOT) contractors. By July 2024, roughly two-thirds of the Morrissey-Neponset walking trail connection was complete.

=== Beades Bridge replacement ===
In February 2023, MassDOT officials announced that a project to replace the Beades Bridge had been greenlighted to proceed to a design phase (to be performed by the management and consulting firm WSP) and estimated that the project could cost as much as $122 million (and with its construction not expected to begin until at least 2028), after the Department sent a letter to Boston Chief of Streets Jascha Franklin-Hodge, Massachusetts State Senator Nick Collins, and Massachusetts State Representative Daniel J. Hunt the previous month stating that the project was now eligible for federal highway funding. While under the purview of the MDC, the state government spent $1.3 million from 1995 to 1999 and $9.1 million in 2001 for repairs to the Beades Bridge to keep it operational, rather than replace the bridge as the MDC recommended in a 1998 report since the bridge was designed to only be operational for 50 years and was constructed in 1928. In December 2023, the Beades Bridge was closed for overnight repair after it failed to close from its upright position.

=== Kosciuszko Circle redesign ===
In March 2021, the administrations of Charlie Baker and Marty Walsh announced a $1 million infrastructure study to improve the Morrissey Boulevard corridor and Kosciuszko Circle, which received its funding from the MassDOT and the Boston Planning & Development Agency (BPDA) in July 2021. In February 2023, Accordia Partners (managing the Dorchester Bay City redevelopment proposal for the former Bayside Expo Center and the 2 Morrissey property) proposed replacing the Kosciuszko Circle rotary with a four-way interchange at a public meeting hosted by the BPDA. In August 2024, MassDOT officials stated that a team of engineers was developing three alternative proposals to redesign Kosciuszko Circle separately from the Morrissey Boulevard redesign commission that would be publicly released in early 2025.

=== MassDOT redesign commission ===
In February 2016, the DCR announced public meetings for designing a restoration project for Morrissey Boulevard to the Neponset River Greenway Council. In July 2022, U.S. Representative Stephen Lynch from Massachusetts's 8th congressional district argued that infrastructure improvements to the Morrissey Boulevard corridor and Kosciuszko Circle should be included in the Infrastructure Investment and Jobs Act funding in an interview with the Dorchester Reporter. In August 2022, Governor Baker signed into law an $11 billion transportation infrastructure bond bill that included $250,000 for improvements to the tide gates at Patten's Cove and that established a commission scheduled to assemble later in the same year and issue a report with findings and recommendations to improve the Morrissey Boulevard corridor and Kosciuszko Circle by June 1, 2023 (and that would include multiple state agency executives, the Mayor of Boston, state and local legislators, or their designees). Due to the transition in gubernatorial administrations from departing Governor Charlie Baker to incoming Governor Maura Healey, the commission did not form by the end of 2022 and the release of its final report was subsequently delayed until 2024. In November 2023, the commission held its first meeting and moved the deadline for its final report to June 2024.

In January 2024, the commission held a public meeting on climate resiliency at the UMass Boston Integrated Sciences Complex and the Dorchester Reporter published an editorial criticizing the MassDOT's handling of the commission for not giving sufficient notice of its public meetings and for not making sufficient effort to solicit public input into the roadway redesign planning. In February 2024, the Columbia-Savin Hill Civic Association voted to create a committee to track developments related to the commission that would be chaired by the designee nominated by State Senator Collins to the commission. In May 2024, the commission held a public meeting at Boston College High School and voted to recommend extending the report deadline at a subsequent virtual meeting in the same month. In June 2024, the commission held a public meeting at Southline Boston that was moderated by Boston City Councilor John FitzGerald and where the commission voted to extend the deadline to the end of the year. In August 2024, the commission held a public meeting at Boston Collegiate Charter School that focused on reconfiguring traffic patterns around the UMass Boston entrance and east-west connectivity with Savin Hill. In September 2024, the commission held another public meeting at Boston Collegiate Charter School that discussed an overview of the roadway corridor layout, an initial alternative analysis for the roadway redesign proposal, and coordinating the proposal with a related city government proposal for enhancing accessibility to the JFK/UMass station.

In October 2024, the Columbia-Savin Hill Civic Association passed a motion of no confidence in the commission, and at an association meeting the next month, the association called on the commission to expand the scope of its work to include other infrastructure issues in the Morrissey corridor and to place a greater focus on improvements to Kosciuszko Circle, while a commission member presented a statement at the meeting calling on the MassDOT to more closely follow the law that created the commission and stated that their concerns would be presented to State Senator Collins. Also in November 2024, the commission held a public meeting where it presented updated budget estimates for the roadway redesign and flood mitigation proposals (excluding modifications to Kosciuszko Circle and the Beades Bridge) that expected the costs to range from $273 million to $352 million over a five-year period (with construction not expected to begin until 2029 or 2030), while the commission chair stated that the report deadline would probably be extended another 60 days and residents and individual commission members argued that the MassDOT should expand the scope of the commission to include the related projects.

== Property redevelopment ==
In January 2008, Boston Mayor Thomas Menino appointed a 15-member task force to develop a 25-year master plan for the Columbia Point neighborhood with the Boston Redevelopment Authority (BRA). In January 2009, the BRA held public meetings for the Columbia Point master plan, and in June 2011, the BRA approved the 25-year master plan for Columbia Point with the support of the Columbia-Savin Hill Civic Association. In June 2012, members of the Clam Point Civic Association unanimously passed a motion declaring opposition to the construction of a billboard at the Expressway Motors Toyota car dealership at 700 Morrissey. In September 2016, Boston Mayor Marty Walsh announced that the Boston Redevelopment Authority would be renamed as the Boston Planning & Development Agency (BPDA) at a meeting with the Greater Boston Chamber of Commerce.

In May 2018, the U.S. Treasury Department approved a request submitted by Massachusetts Governor Charlie Baker at the recommendation of the Walsh administration that the Columbia Point census tract, which includes the segment of Morrissey Boulevard north of Patten's Cove and the UMass Boston entrance, be designated as an opportunity zone under the Tax Cuts and Jobs Act. In September 2022, Massachusetts Department of Transportation Administrative Law Judge Al Caldarelli ruled that a proposal by the Bay Colony Associates to convert a static billboard at the Boston Bowl bowling alley at 820 Morrissey into a digital billboard should be approved due to the removal of a billboard at 65 Tenean Street, and remanded the issue to the Massachusetts Office of Outdoor Advertising (OOA) after the OOA rejected the proposal the previous January.

=== Biotechnology industry ===
==== Dorchester Bay City ====
In June 2019, Accordia Partners acquired five buildings at 2 Morrissey across Mount Vernon Street from the Bayside Expo Center after the University of Massachusetts Board of Trustees unanimously approved a 99-year final lease agreement for the Bayside property with Accordia for approximately $192 million to $235 million the previous February. In March 2020, Accordia filed a 3-page letter of intent with the Boston Planning & Development Agency (BPDA) for its Bayside Expo Center redevelopment proposal. In June 2020, the BPDA announced that it was seeking nominations for a community advisory committee to jointly review the Accordia Bayside proposal and the Center Court Partners 75 Morrissey proposal. In September 2020, Accordia filed a 187-page project notification form with the BPDA for a mixed-use development at the Bayside Expo Center titled "Dorchester Bay City" on 34 acres of land that will total 5.9 million square feet of gross floor area laid out over 17 city blocks, and will feature commercial and public space as well as 1,740 residential housing units. In September 2023, the BPDA board approved Accordia's final master plan for the Bay City proposal.

==== 35–75 Morrissey ====
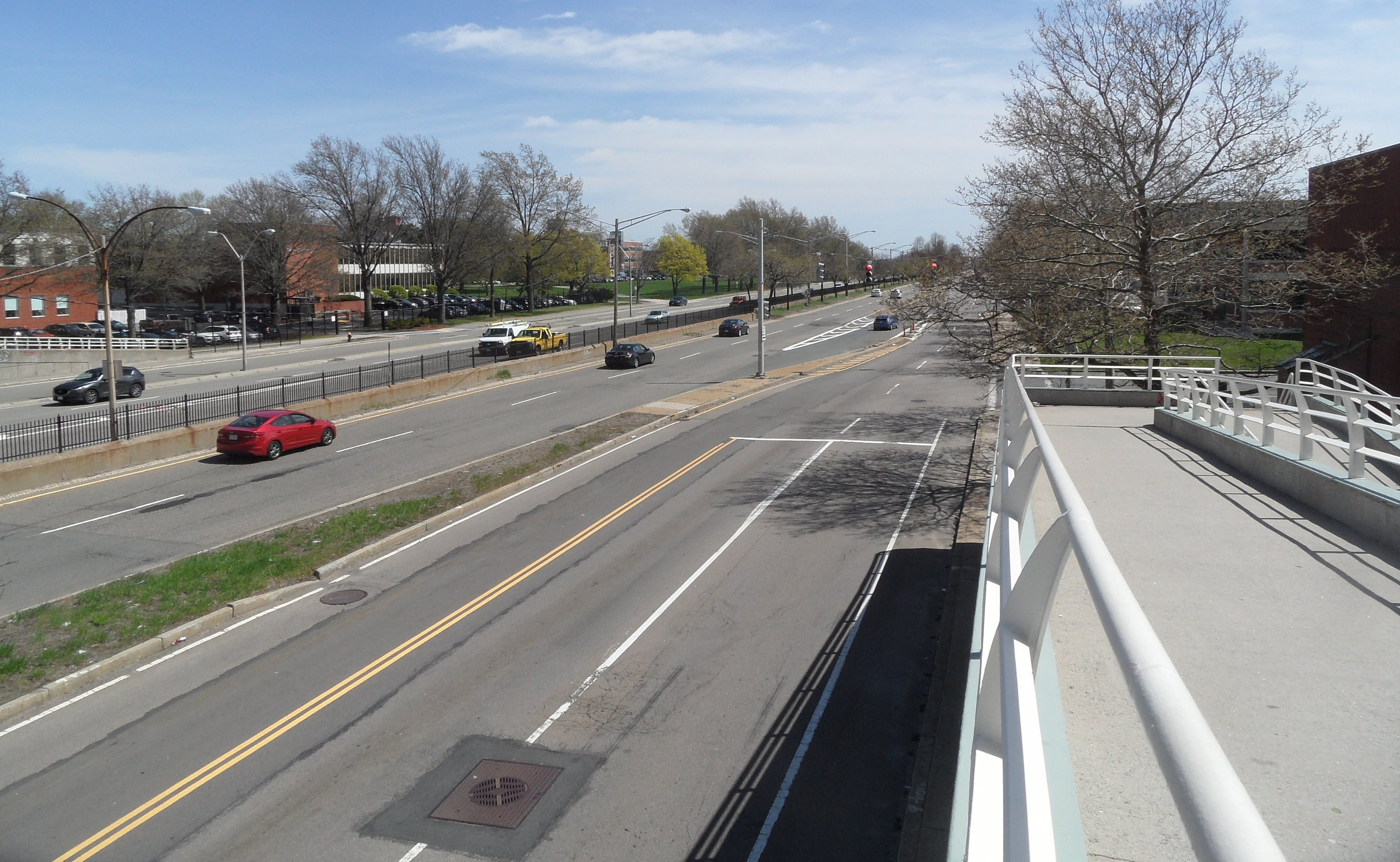
The thoroughfare from the pedestrian overpass adjacent to the Star Market at 35 Morrissey in April 2019.

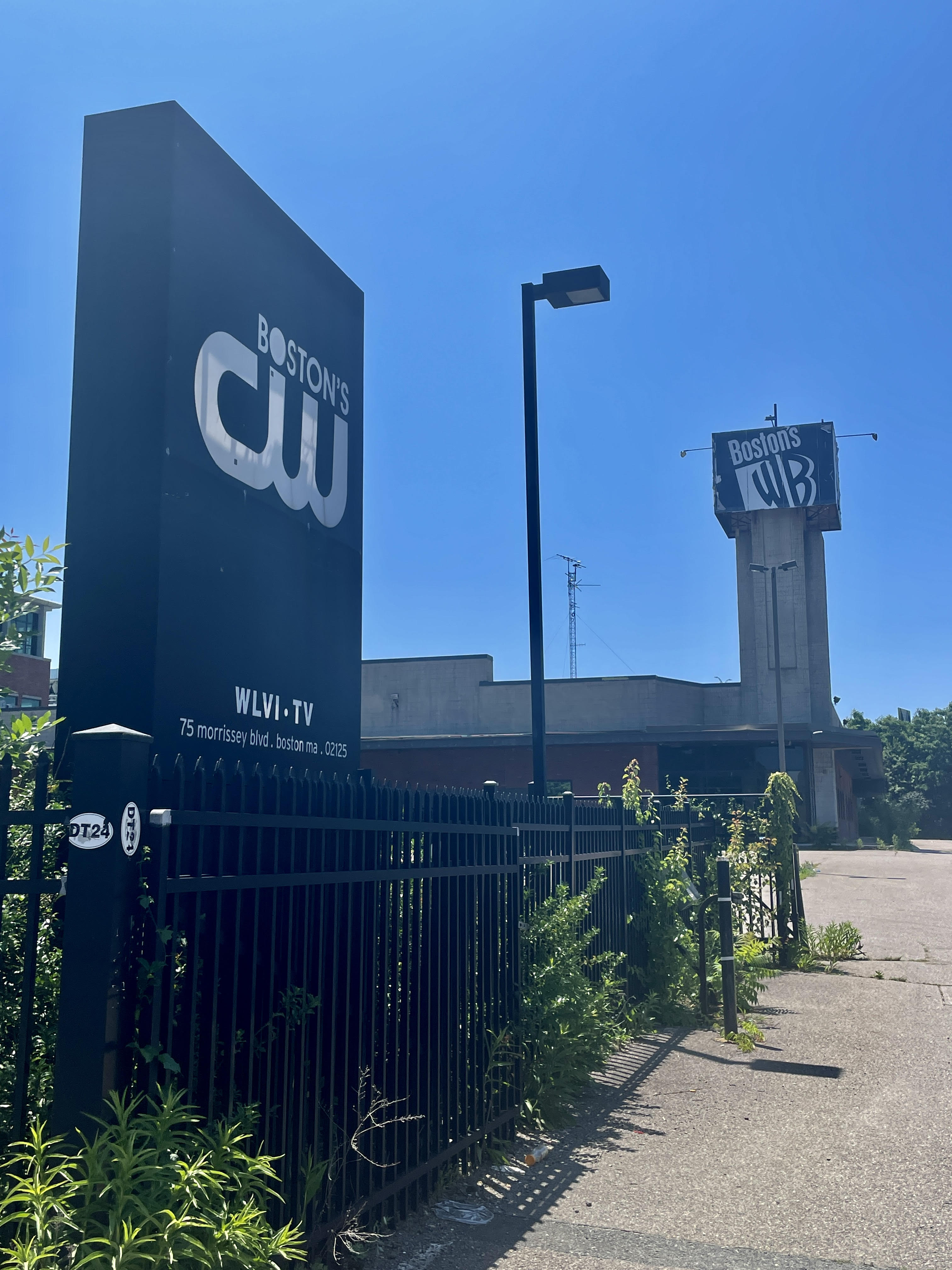
Entrance sign for WLVI television station at 75 Morrissey with CW affiliate logo and station pylon with former WB affiliate logo in July 2023.

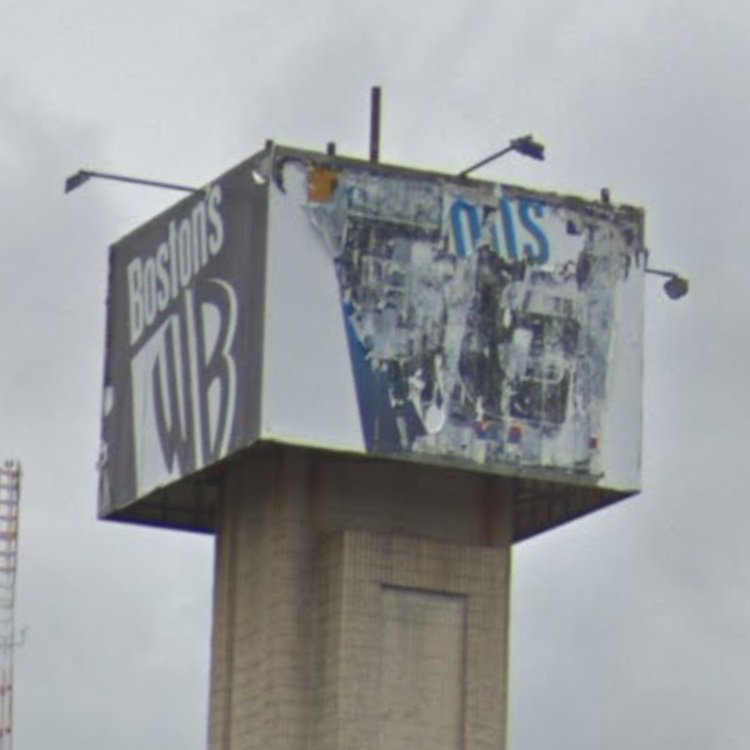
Station pylon in October 2019.

In September 2006, the Tribune Company sold the WLVI television station at 75 Morrissey to Sunbeam Television (owner of then-NBC affiliate WHDH-TV) for $117.3 million that would take effect the following December. After the transfer of ownership took place, Sunbeam laid-off virtually the entire staff of the facility and was in the process of attempting to lease the facility by the end of the following year. In November 2008, Synergy Investments purchased the Star Market at 35 Morrissey and included the facility and surrounding property in a proposal to the BRA to construct 180,000 square feet of retail space, 500,000 square feet of office space, and 700 housing units. In February 2009, the MBTA and the DCR announced that they would not permit the construction of a side street included in the Synergy proposal. In October 2012, Herb Chambers Companies announced its intention to purchase the former WLVI television station at 75 Morrissey from WHDH and convert it into a BMW car dealership.

In November 2012, the BRA announced a public meeting to be held the following month at the Cristo Rey Boston High School to discuss the Herb Chambers WLVI station proposal, where Herb Chambers and Boston City Councilor Frank Baker spoke in defense of the project while Baker also expressed concerns about the effects of the project on the Columbia Point master plan. In July 2016, Herb Chambers proposed an 80,000-square foot Jaguar and Land Rover car dealership in a 5-story building at 75 Morrissey at a Columbia-Savin Hill Civic Association meeting. During a meeting with a BRA official in September 2016, Columbia-Savin Hill Civic Association members expressed opposition to the Herb Chambers 75 Morrissey proposal. In June 2017, Herb Chambers Companies sold 75 Morrissey to Center Court Properties for $14.5 million. In August 2018, Center Court purchased the Star Market at 35 Morrissey and the Beasley Broadcast Group office building at 55 Morrissey for $56 million.

The following month, Center Court announced a proposal to construct a 22-story building and a 25-story building with 758 apartments at 75 Morrissey. In March 2019, Center Court discussed their proposal for 75 Morrissey at a Columbia-Savin Hill Civic Association meeting, and at a subsequent Columbia-Savin Hill Civic Association meeting the following June, Center Court announced a proposal for all of the company's holdings from 35 Morrissey to 75 Morrissey to construct 1,080 units of housing, 86,500 square feet of retail, including a 60,000-square foot market and with the height of the buildings at 75 Morrissey reduced to 21 and 24 stories. In October 2019, Center Court announced a revised proposal for 75 Morrissey to the Columbia-Savin Hill Civic Association that reduced the height of the buildings to 15 and 17 stories. In January 2020, Center Court filed a letter of intent with the BPDA for its revised 75 Morrissey proposal.

In June 2020, the BPDA announced that it was seeking nominations for a community advisory committee to jointly review the Accordia Partners Bayside proposal and the Center Court 75 Morrissey proposal. In February 2021, Center Court filed a letter of intent with the BPDA to modify its 75 Morrissey proposal to one residential building with 175 units and one building with 250,000 square feet of office space for use by life science companies. In March 2022, Center Court presented a revised proposal to members of the Columbia-Savin Hill Civic Association to develop its 9 acres of land in between the former Boston Globe headquarters and the JFK/UMass station from 35 Morrissey to 75 Morrissey into seven 9-to-22-story buildings with four buildings intended for use by biotechnology companies and three buildings for residential use. In August 2022, Center Court filed a master plan with the BPDA for its seven-building proposal for 35 to 75 Morrissey.

In November 2022, Center Court held a virtual public meeting for the proposal where residents praised the proposal's consistency with the Columbia Point master plan, but expressed concern about the proposal's traffic impacts and any safety impacts from the life science laboratories for neighboring residents, while a Center Court official stated that it was too early in the proposal's development to know whether it would feature completely green buildings and, following directives from the Wu administration about the city's participation in a state pilot program requiring new property developments in the city to use all-renewable energy, that new life science and health care facilities would be exempt from the all-renewable energy requirement. In early 2023, Center Court entered into an agreement with The Record Co. to convert the facility at 55 Morrissey temporarily into a music rehearsal space for local musicians with 88 rentable studios.

In December 2023, the BPDA approved the Center Court proposal. In December 2024, Copper Mill and POB Capital of Chicago filed a letter of intent with the BPDA that stated that they would submit a plan for public review within 60 days for the 35–75 Morrissey properties to construct only two buildings with 750 housing units and reduced life science space and that made no mention of Center Court or its company officials. In January 2025, Copper Mill's CEO stated at a Columbia-Savin Hill Civic Association meeting that the company intended to follow the master plan for the property approved by the BPDA in 2023.

==== Southline Boston ====
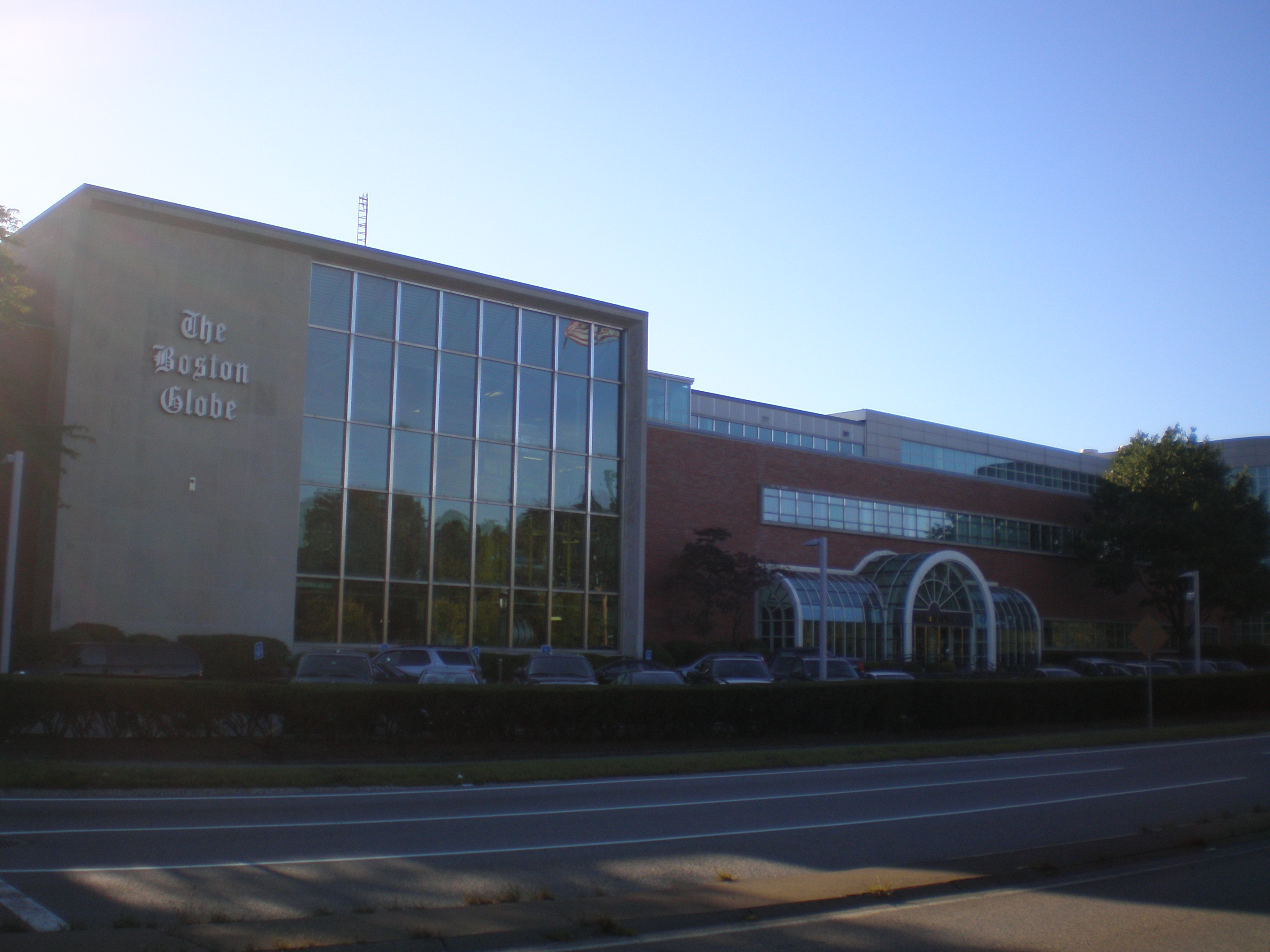
Former Boston Globe headquarters at 135 Morrissey in September 2009.

In December 2015, The Boston Globe announced it would move its headquarters from 135 Morrissey to Exchange Place in Downtown Boston. In 1958, The Boston Globe moved from its original location on Washington Street to the Morrissey location until moving in January 2017. In November 2014, The Boston Globe entered into a purchase and sale agreement with Winstanley Enterprises for 135 Morrissey that Winstanley withdrew from in February 2015. In July 2016, The Boston Globe agreed to sell 135 Morrissey to Center Court Properties for $80 million which Center Court cancelled in May 2017. In August 2017, The Boston Globe agreed to sell 135 Morrissey to the Nordblom Company. In October 2017, Nordblom proposed renovating and re-using the facility for high tech and robotics companies to the Columbia-Savin Hill Civic Association, and Nordblom filed a letter of intent for the proposal with the BPDA the following month. In December 2017, The Boston Globe sold 135 Morrissey to Nordblom for $81 million, and the following month, Nordblom filed a project notification form with the BPDA for a $200 million project called The BEAT to redevelop the property into a biotechnology and advanced manufacturing facility. In March 2018, Nordblom announced an agreement with the DCR to contribute to the maintenance of Patten's Cove for at least 10 years (with the DCR retaining ownership) at a public meeting for their proposal to redevelop the 135 Morrissey property.

In April 2018, the Nordblom proposal was approved by the BPDA, and the Nordblom proposal was approved by the Zoning Board of Appeals the following August. In February 2019, Nordblom received a building permit for The BEAT. In August 2021, Nordblom announced that tenants would begin to occupy The BEAT the following spring as well as a partnership with Beacon Capital Partners. In January 2022, Beacon and Nordblom announced a proposal at a public meeting to construct a 6-story building on-site at The BEAT for biotechnology company tenants. In February 2022, the NoBull announced that it would be the first tenant at The BEAT and begin to occupy its space the following September, while Flagship Pioneering was in negotiations for space in the facility. In the same month, Beacon and Nordblom requested support from the Columbia-Savin Hill Civic Association on an application for animal testing at The BEAT. In April 2022, Beacon announced to the Columbia-Savin Hill Civic Association that it would apply for a liquor license for a restaurant at The BEAT.

In June 2022, the Columbia-Savin Hill Civic Association approved the Beacon-Nordblom proposal for a 6-story building at the site of The BEAT and their liquor license application for the main facility, while Beacon proposed renaming the complex as Southline Boston. In November 2022, Beacon and the Massachusetts Biotechnology Council announced that the latter would create a 4,000 square foot training center featuring three certificate programs for prospective technicians and lab assistants at Southline Boston. In March 2023, Beacon filed a project change notice with the BPDA for the additional 6-story building at 135 Morrissey to include a skyway connecting the new building with the main facility and more office space, while Portal Innovations, a Chicago-based biotech venture capital firm, announced that it would open a location at Southline Boston in partnership with Beacon and ZoE Life Sciences. In July 2023, the Massachusetts Biotechnology Council held an official groundbreaking ceremony for the training center (named "Bioversity"), and the training center hosted a conference for residents and prospective trainees at the site in September 2023. In January 2024, the training center opened.

=== Housing ===
In October 2012, Synergy Investments announced a $60 million proposal to the Boston Redevelopment Authority (BRA) to construct two 5-story buildings with 278 units of rental housing at 25 Morrissey. In December 2012, a public meeting was held at Boston College High School to discuss the 25 Morrissey proposal (with Boston City Councilor Frank Baker and Massachusetts State Representative Marty Walsh in attendance) and where interest in buying air rights over JFK/UMass station was also discussed. After the BRA approved the 25 Morrissey proposal in 2013, Synergy agreed to sell the property and project rights to Criterion Development Partners to complete in May 2014. In January 2017, Phillips Family Properties announced that the Old Colony House and Freeport Tavern at 780 Morrissey would close that month, and the property was officially put up for sale the following May.

In September 2019, Michaels Development announced that it would file a letter of intent with the Boston Planning & Development Agency (BPDA) the following month for a proposal to convert 780 Morrissey into a 6-story, 200-unit apartment complex in conjunction with Phillips Family Properties. In August 2020, the BPDA hosted a virtual public meeting for the 780 Morrissey proposal, while Phillips Family Properties held its own virtual public meeting for the proposal with neighboring residents in November 2020. In January 2021, the BPDA approved the 780 Morrissey proposal. In November 2021, the BPDA announced a public meeting scheduled for the following month to review a proposal to redevelop the Ramada hotel at 800 Morrissey also owned by Phillips Family Properties into a 6-story residential building with 240 units. In August 2022, the Pine Street Inn and The Community Builders announced a series of public meetings for a proposal to convert the Comfort Inn at 900 Morrissey into a supportive housing development for the formerly homeless with 105 to 110 units while the BPDA held a virtual public meeting for the 800 Morrissey proposal.

In September 2022, Pine Street and the Community Builders hosted a public meeting for the 900 Morrissey proposal with Boston Housing Office Chief Sheila Dillon and City Councilors Frank Baker and Erin Murphy in attendance where Baker and Murphy expressed opposition to the proposal due to public safety concerns, while Rev. Richard Conway of St. Peter's Parish in the Bowdoin-Geneva neighborhood spoke in support of the proposal. In an interview with the Dorchester Reporter in the same month, Boston Mayor Michelle Wu did not commit to supporting the 900 Morrissey proposal due to its stage of development (but stated that more supportive housing was needed in the city and praised the Pine Street Inn as a homeless service provider), while the Dorchester Reporter itself published an editorial in favor of expediting the proposal's BPDA review process. In October 2022, City Realty of Allston filed a letter of intent with the BPDA for a 52-unit housing development at 13 Norwood Street (the first side street off the northbound side of Morrissey after the I-93 underpass at Neponset Circle).

In November 2022, Pine Street and the Community Builders filed a letter of intent for the 900 Morrissey proposal with the BPDA. In December 2022, the BPDA held a public meeting for the 900 Morrissey proposal with as many as 270 residents in attendance along with BPDA Chief Arthur Jemison, Boston Housing Office Chief Sheila Dillon, and Pine Street and Community Builders officials where many residents expressed opposition to the proposal, reiterating public safety concerns due to the proposal's proximity to the Richard J. Murphy K-8 School while the Pine Street officials stated that they plan on using a security firm for the development and having caseworkers on site. In the same month, the BPDA approved the 800 Morrissey proposal, while residents opposed to the 900 Morrissey proposal held a sidewalk protest in front of the property and the Dorchester Reporter published a subsequent editorial that argued for the BPDA to approve the 900 Morrissey proposal.

In January 2023, the public comment window for the 900 Morrissey proposal closed with the BPDA receiving more than 400 letters and emails in total and slightly more communications expressing opposition (but with more than 200 communications expressing support), including letters from First Parish Church Board of Trustees Chair Ardis Vaughan, Rev. Gerald Osterman of the St. Monica's and St. Peter's Parishes of South Boston, the city Age Strong Commission, and the Boston Advisory Council on Ending Homelessness all expressing support, while Massachusetts State Senator Nick Collins, Massachusetts State Representative Daniel J. Hunt, Boston City Council President Ed Flynn, City Councilors Erin Murphy, Michael F. Flaherty, and Frank Baker wrote a joint letter expressing opposition and Pope's Hill Neighborhood Association President John Schneiderman also wrote a letter expressing opposition.

In May 2023, the BPDA held a public hearing for the 900 Morrissey proposal where Pine Street officials stated that the proposal would include a senior preference of 62 years and older and that Pine Street had filed a revision to the proposal with the BPDA that reduced the number of housing units in the proposed development to 99, and in the same month, the BPDA board unanimously approved the 900 Morrissey proposal. In January 2024, Massachusetts Governor Maura Healey announced that the 900 Morrissey supportive housing development would be among 26 housing developments across 19 cities and towns receiving funding under the state Low-Income Housing Tax Credit program. In response to reporting by the Boston Herald about the 900 Morrissey development, the Dorchester Reporter published an editorial that stated that the 900 Morrissey development is not being considered for housing migrant families. In February 2024, the 780 Morrissey development began housing its first tenants.

=== Retail ===
In October 2003, National Wholesale Liquidators opened a store at 725 Morrissey. In December 2008, National Wholesale announced that the 725 Morrissey store would close after the company filed for Chapter 11 bankruptcy protection. In May 2009, the Westminster Dodge car dealership was ordered closed the following month. In February 2010, National Wholesale announced that the 725 Morrissey store would re-open the following April. In November 2011, the Westminster Motors car dealership at 710 Morrissey closed. In April 2015, East Boston Savings Bank announced it would open a retail branch at 960 Morrissey later in the year and the branch opened the following October. In November 2018, Herb Chambers Companies announced that it would move its Honda car dealership from Commonwealth Avenue in Allston to 720 Morrissey the following year. In October 2019, Floor & Decor announced that it would acquire the National Wholesale store at 729 Morrissey that closed after National Wholesale filed for bankruptcy protection a second time the previous year. At a community meeting sponsored by the Boston Planning & Development Agency (BPDA) in November 2019, Herb Chambers Companies proposed expanding its Honda car dealership at 710–720 Morrissey from a 1-story building into a 4-story building with 222 indoor parking spaces and 171 surface spaces.

In January 2020, the BPDA held a public meeting with Floor & Decor representatives the following month for its 729 Morrissey proposal. In March 2020, the BPDA approved the Floor & Decor 729 Morrissey proposal, and the Zoning Board of Appeals approved the Floor & Decor 729 Morrissey proposal the following October. In March 2022, the BPDA approved the Herb Chambers Honda car dealership expansion proposal at 710–720 Morrissey. In January 2023, the 777 Morrissey property with Puritan Plaza and Lambert's Rainbow Market, a 65-year-old family-owned deli and produce market, was put up for sale by a trust controlled by the Lambert family (although its listing noted that the Lambert family had signed a 10-year NNN lease for the market and plaza to continue business for the lease's duration). The 731–777 Morrissey property was sold to Dorchester Realty Ventures the following September for $10 million. In June 2024, the co-owners of the Blarney Stone bar and restaurant in Fields Corner stated in an interview with the Dorchester Reporter that they would close that restaurant to open a second location for the Milkweed diner and café on Tremont Street in Mission Hill that they also co-own in leased space in a strip mall on Morrissey. In October 2024, the Expressway Toyota dealership on Morrissey was sold for $21.5 million to a car dealership company based in Cranston, Rhode Island.

== Major intersections ==
The entire route is in the Dorchester neighborhood of Boston, Suffolk County.

mi	km	Destinations	Notes
0.0	0.0	Route 3A / Route 203 (Gallivan Boulevard) – Neponset, Quincy, Ashmont, Forest Hills, Jamaica Plain	
0.3	0.48	I-93 / US 1 (Route 3) – Boston, Braintree, Cape Cod	Exit 12 on I-93 / US 1 / Route 3
2.6	4.2	Columbia Road / Day Boulevard – Boston, South Boston, Quincy	Traffic circle
1.000 mi = 1.609 km; 1.000 km = 0.621 mi
