= Dorchesterway =

Unbuilt parkway in Boston, Massachusetts

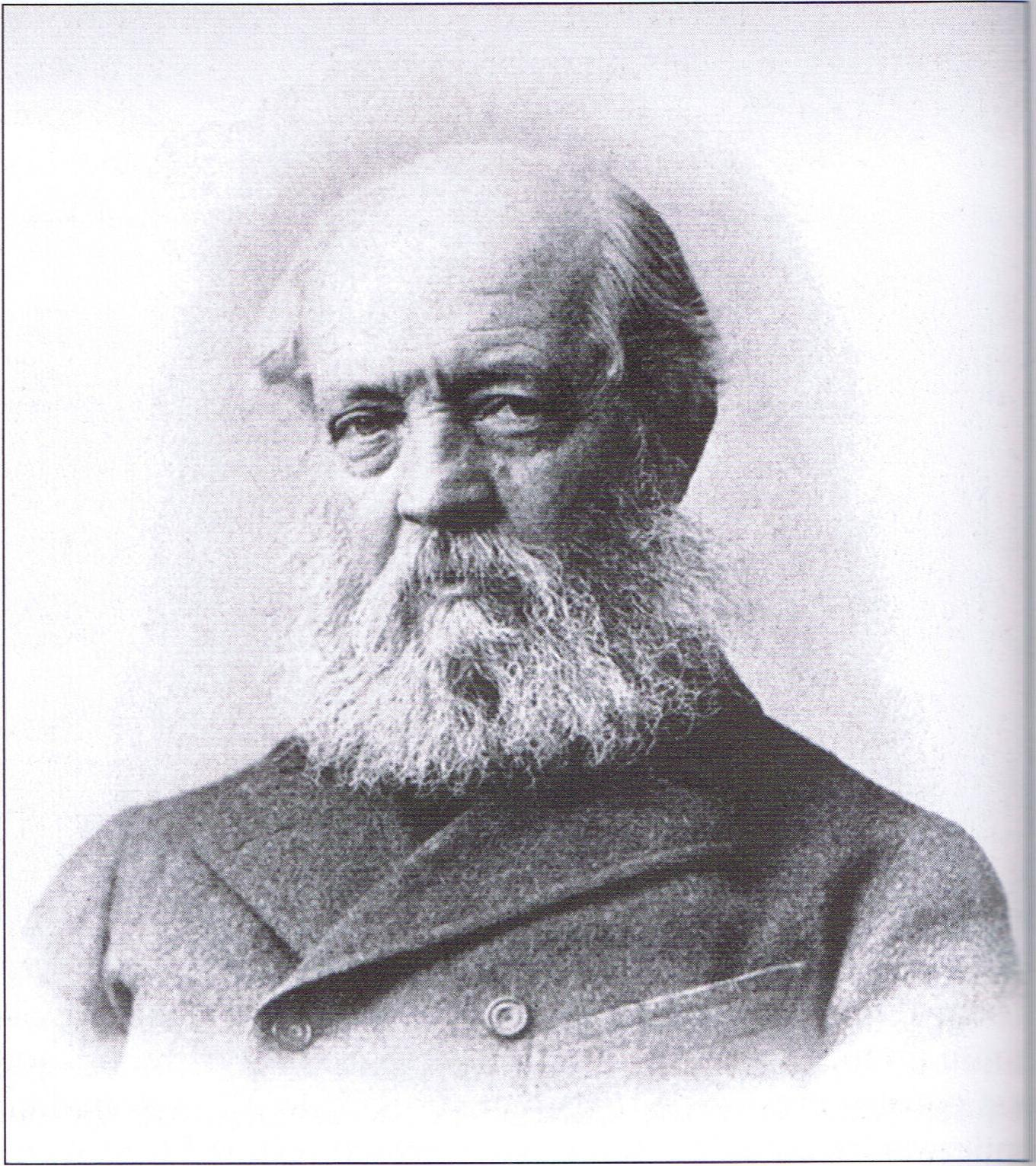
Frederick Law Olmsted, the 19th century landscape designer who envisioned the Dorchesterway as the final "link" in his Emerald Necklace

The Dorchesterway was a parkway planned by 19th century landscape designer Frederick Law Olmsted to be a continuation of the Emerald Necklace park network in Boston, Massachusetts. This plan, however, was never implemented.

== History ==
=== Olmsted's vision ===
The Emerald Necklace, as extant today, has a sort of "L" shape. It starts at the Boston Common near Downtown Crossing and extends out to the Arnold Arboretum (which starts in Forest Hills but has portions in Roslindale near the West Roxbury border). It then changes direction back inwards as the Arboretum connects via the Arborway to Franklin Park.

Olmsted wanted the Emerald Necklace to continue via the Dorchesterway to the shore of Boston Harbor's Dorchester Bay and thus form a "U" shape. He intended Columbia Road in Dorchester and the Strandway (the southern roadway of which is now known as William J. Day Boulevard) in South Boston to connect South Boston's Marine Park and Pleasure Bay to the network of natural-looking green spaces he had designed.

However:

...conditions of Columbia Road when the parks system was being established [...] precluded this vision from becoming a reality. When Columbia Road was formally designed in the late 1800s, there was already a relatively high density of buildings. The road had street rails that were used by a streetcar trolley connecting Uphams Corner and Franklin Park. There was a grass strip in the center and roads on either side, one for commercial traffic and the other for pleasure traffic. As a result, Columbia Road failed to serve the purposes of either the businesses or the pleasure travelers well, and there was not enough room for what Olmsted considered a proper parkway.

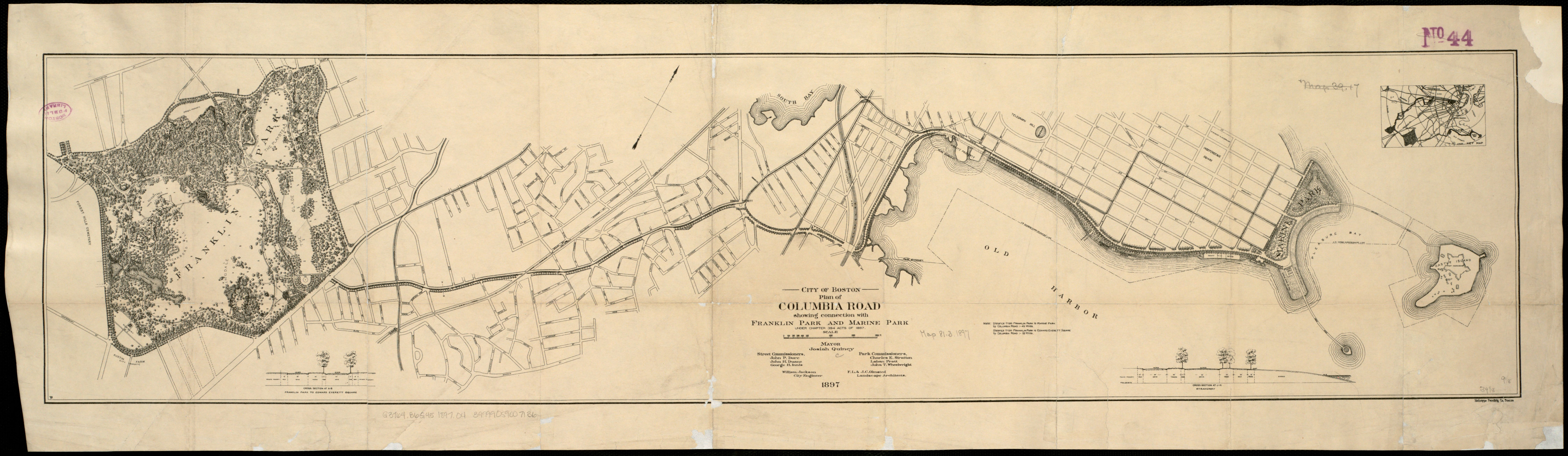
Olmsted's 1897 plan for Columbia Road (the Dorchesterway) and the Strandway

=== Later changes ===
Some trees and planters were added on Columbia Boulevard in the late 1980s.

In the last decade, the Boston Department of Parks and Recreation planted and has been maintaining trees, grass, planters and other vegetation along one section of Columbia Road.

But despite the recent greening of parts of Columbia Road, natural elements in this area remain meager due to the dense neighborhood development. For this reason, the corridor is not a parkway along the lines of other sections of the Emerald Necklace in nearby Jamaica Plain, and Columbia Road is not considered part of the Emerald Necklace.

The Boston bid for the 2024 Summer Olympics proposed private funding to remove the median of Columbia Road and install trees and separated bike lanes, but the bid was withdrawn in July, 2015.

=== Proposals ===
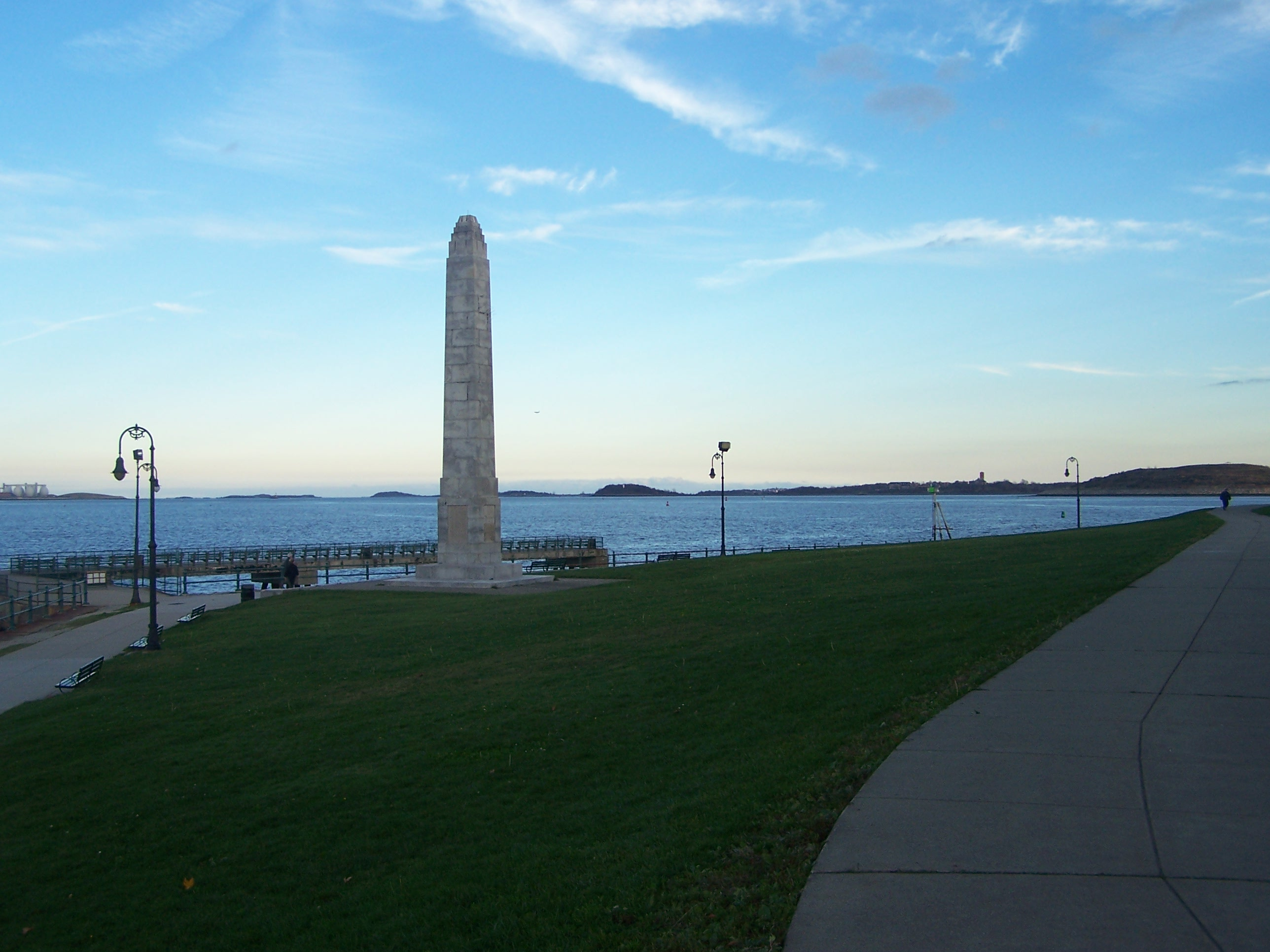
Castle Island, considered to be part of South Boston, was formerly an island in Boston Harbor, but is now connected via a causeway to the mainland near the proposed terminus of the Dorchesterway.

It is possible that some incarnation of a Dorchesterway connecting the Emerald Necklace to the seashore might someday come into being. Members of the Emerald Necklace Conservancy, expressing a long-term vision for the Boston Parks system, have proposed using Columbia Road to enhance the connections between Franklin Park, Marine Park and Pleasure Bay via Columbia Road. Linking to South Boston has also been discussed. According to Simone Auster, former director of the Emerald Necklace Conservancy:

...a vision for a "completed" Emerald Necklace has not yet been flushed out by the Conservancy or other groups, but the idea of the system connecting to Pleasure Bay and Castle Island via Columbia Road and eventually back to Back Bay Fens or Boston Common resonates with many Bostonians.

A representative of the Boston Department of Parks and Recreation said:

It should be a priority to reconnect Columbia Road and give it a boulevard feeling. The quality of space, the mature trees and grass—they should be as much a part of making this area feel special as on the opposite side.

In 2004, a Boston Redevelopment Authority strategic plan for the improvement of Roxbury recommended major street reconstruction, including trees and antique-style lamp posts, to give Columbia Road the character of a pleasant boulevard.
