= Day Boulevard =

Parkway in Boston, Massachusetts

William J. Day Boulevard
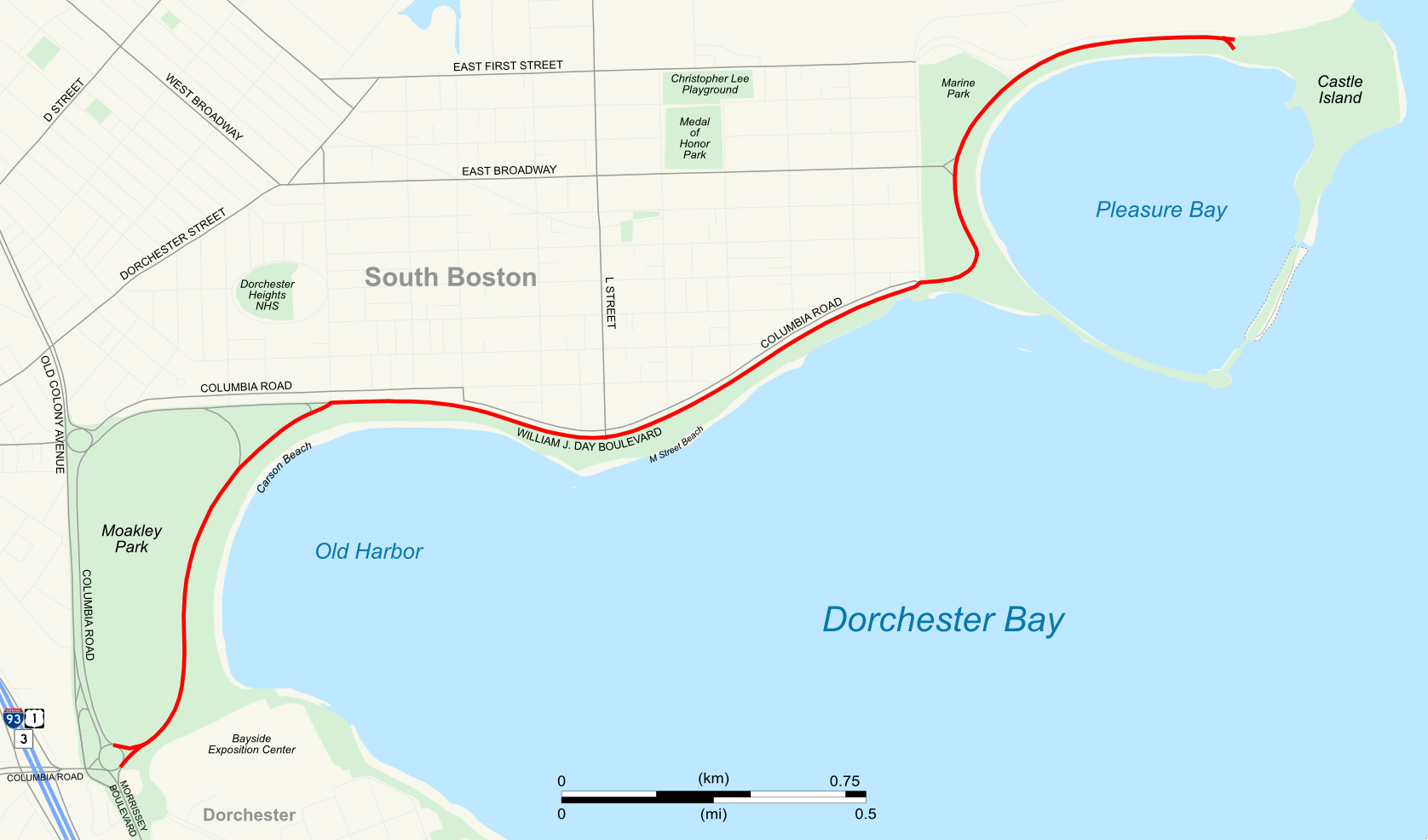
- Map of South Boston with Day Boulevard highlighted in red
- Interactive map of William J. Day Boulevard
- Maintained by: Department of Conservation and Recreation
- Length: 2.6 mi (4.2 km)
- Location: Boston, Middlesex County, Massachusetts
- Coordinates: 42°19′51.18″N 71°01′50.38″W
- West end: Morrissey Boulevard in South Boston
- East end: Castle Island in South Boston

William J. Day Boulevard, or Day Boulevard, is a coastal parkway in Boston, Massachusetts. Beginning at Morrissey Boulevard and Kosciuszko Circle at the northern extent of the Dorchester section of the city, it travels in a gently curving northeasterly direction 2.6 miles (4.2 km) through South Boston along beaches around the west and north shore of Dorchester Bay. It was named for William J. Day.

In its eastern part, the road passes through the South Boston Boat Clubs Historic District and Marine Park before ending at Castle Island, site of a historic fort and state park. It is owned and maintained by the Massachusetts Department of Conservation and Recreation as part of the Metropolitan Park System of Greater Boston. Carson Beach, M Street Beach and Pleasure Bay are beaches along Day Boulevard that are part of the park system.

== History ==
Day Boulevard was originally called the Strandway, and was planned beginning in the late nineteenth century as the easternmost link of the Emerald Necklace, the string of connected parks and waterways created by Frederick Law Olmsted. Plans for the connection of Franklin Park across Dorchester via a parkway to be called Dorchesterway to South Boston and Marine Park at the east end of the South Boston peninsula via the Strandway were not realized, and the route was eventually called Columbia Road. The southern roadway of the two roadways that formed Columbia Road was named William J. Day Boulevard in honor of a popular South Boston political figure after he died in 1950. William Day was the father of Louise Day Hicks, U.S. Representative for South Boston from 1971–73.

Day Boulevard is a contributing property to a National Register of Historic Places district, the Old Harbor Reservation Parkways.
