= Old Harbor Reservation Parkways =

Streets in Boston, Massachusetts

- Old Harbor Reservation Parkways, Metropolitan Park System of Greater Boston
- U.S. National Register of Historic Places
- U.S. Historic district
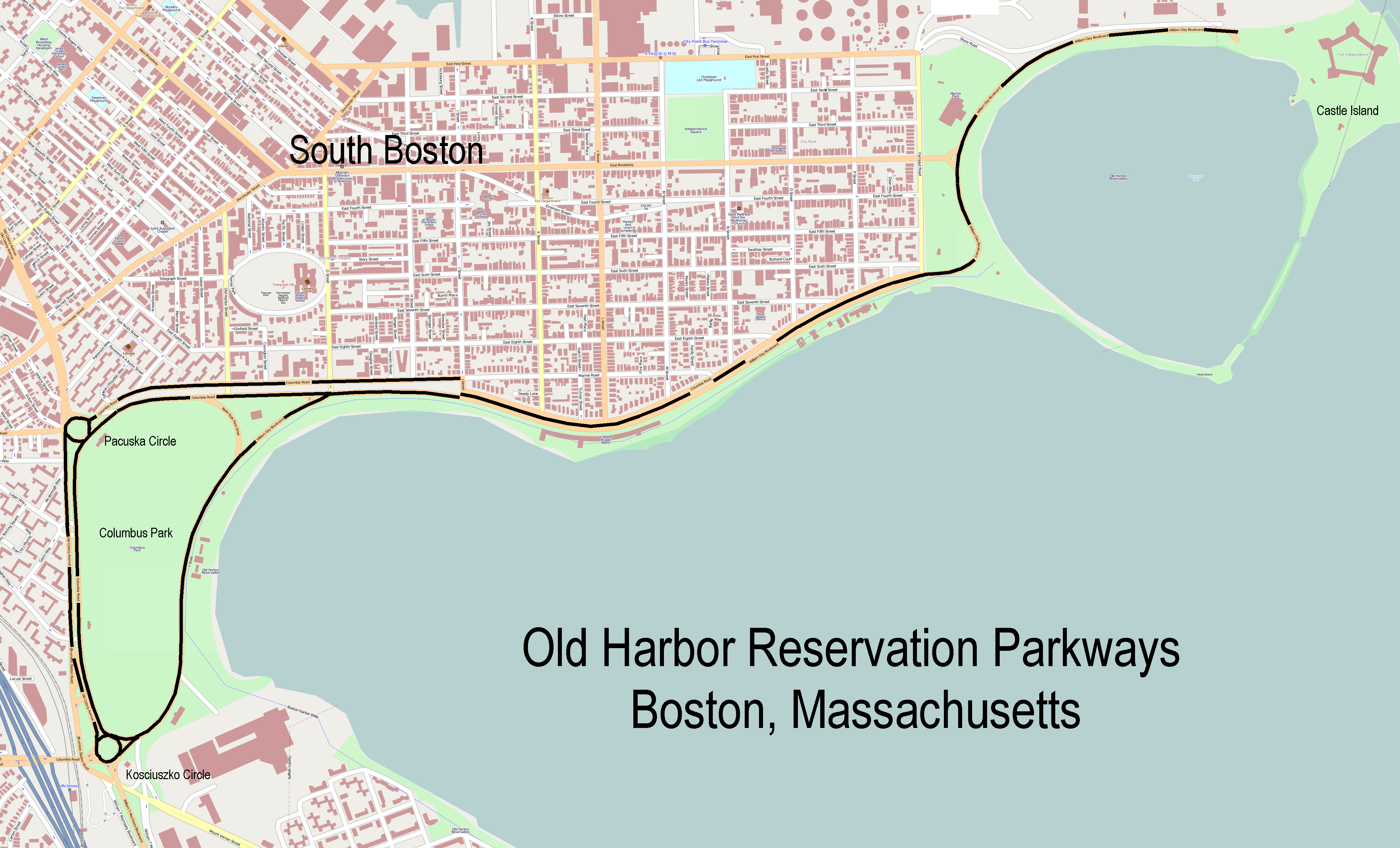

- Location within Massachusetts Location within the United States
- Location: Boston, Massachusetts
- Coordinates: 42°19′46″N 71°2′45″W
- Area: 55.8 acres (22.6 ha)
- Built: 1893
- Architect: Frederick Law Olmsted; Arthur Shurcliff
- MPS: Metropolitan Park System of Greater Boston MPS
- NRHP reference No.: 08000693
- Added to NRHP: July 24, 2008

The Old Harbor Reservation Parkways are three historic roads in South Boston. They are part of the Boston parkway system designed by Frederick Law Olmsted. They include

- all of William J. Day Boulevard, running from Castle Island to Kosciuszko Circle along Pleasure Bay and the Old Harbor shore.
- the part of Columbia Road from its northeastern end at Farragut Road west to Pacuska Circle (formerly called Preble Circle). This section of road runs quite close to Day Boulevard for much of its length, diverging to form the northern boundary of Joe Moakley Park (formerly called Columbus Park). A discontiguous segment of Columbia Road running southwest from Kosciuszko Circle into Dorchester is not part of the parkway system.
- the part of Old Colony Avenue from its southern end near Kosciuszko Circle, northward to Pacuska Circle. This section of road forms the western border of Joe Moakley Park. Old Colony Avenue north of Pacuska Circle is not part of the parkway system.

These roadways follow the southern shoreline of South Boston west from Castle Island, and surround what is now known as Joe Moakley Park. The southernmost point of these roadways is Kosckiuszko Circle. The roadways were added to the National Register of Historic Places on July 24, 2008.

== History ==
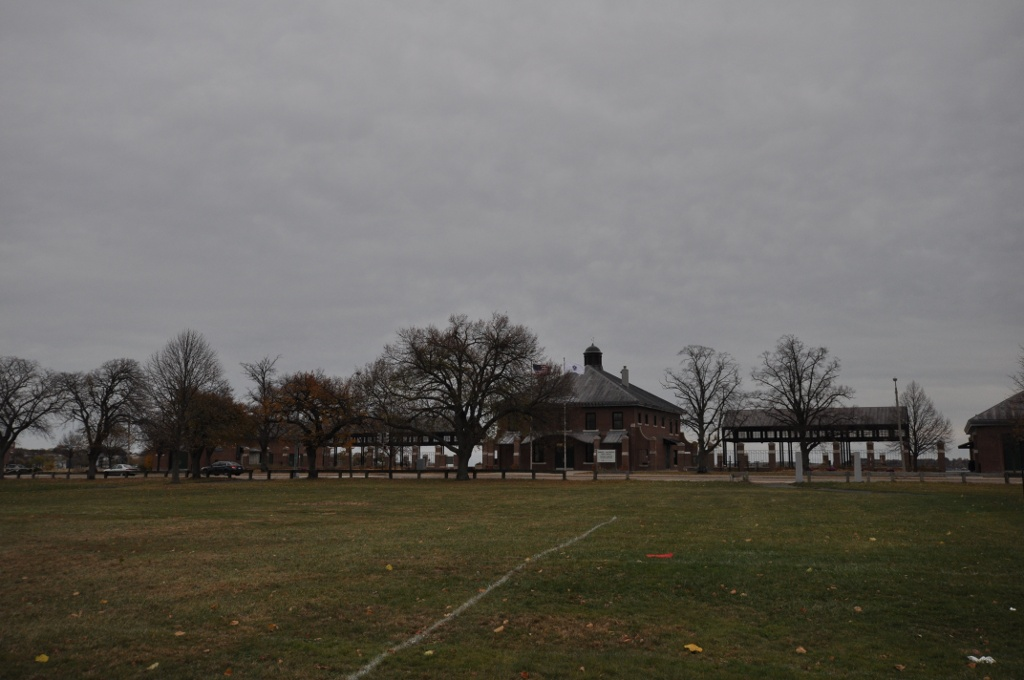
Moakley Park, Day Boulevard, and the McCormack Bath House

When Frederick Law Olmsted drafted his plans for Boston's Emerald Necklace of parks in the 1870s, it included the notion of a connection between Franklin Park and the coastline of South Boston and Dorchester, with a waterfront park area. The first formal proposal for the parkland that is now Joe Moakley Park and the causeway connecting Castle Island to the mainland were submitted by Olmsted in the 1880s. Implementation of these plans was delayed in part because Castle Island was still under federal military jurisdiction.

Because of this, the causeway that opened in 1892 was separated from Castle Island by a drawbridge, and it was on that that the oldest of the parkways (originally Gardner Way, now the eastern half of Day Boulevard) was opened. The island would not be fully connected until the 1930s. The development of Joe Moakley Park and the surrounding parkways was planned as part of the connection between Franklin Park and Marine Park (the eastern end of Day Boulevard), with land takings beginning in the 1890s. Old Colony Avenue was laid out in 1898 on a former railroad right-of-way, but the Strandway (now the southern part of Day Boulevard) was not completed until the 1920s. Later aspects of this work were designed by Olmsted protege Arthur Shurcliff.

== See also ==
- National Register of Historic Places listings in southern Boston, Massachusetts
