= Dorchester Shores Reservation =

Massachusetts state park

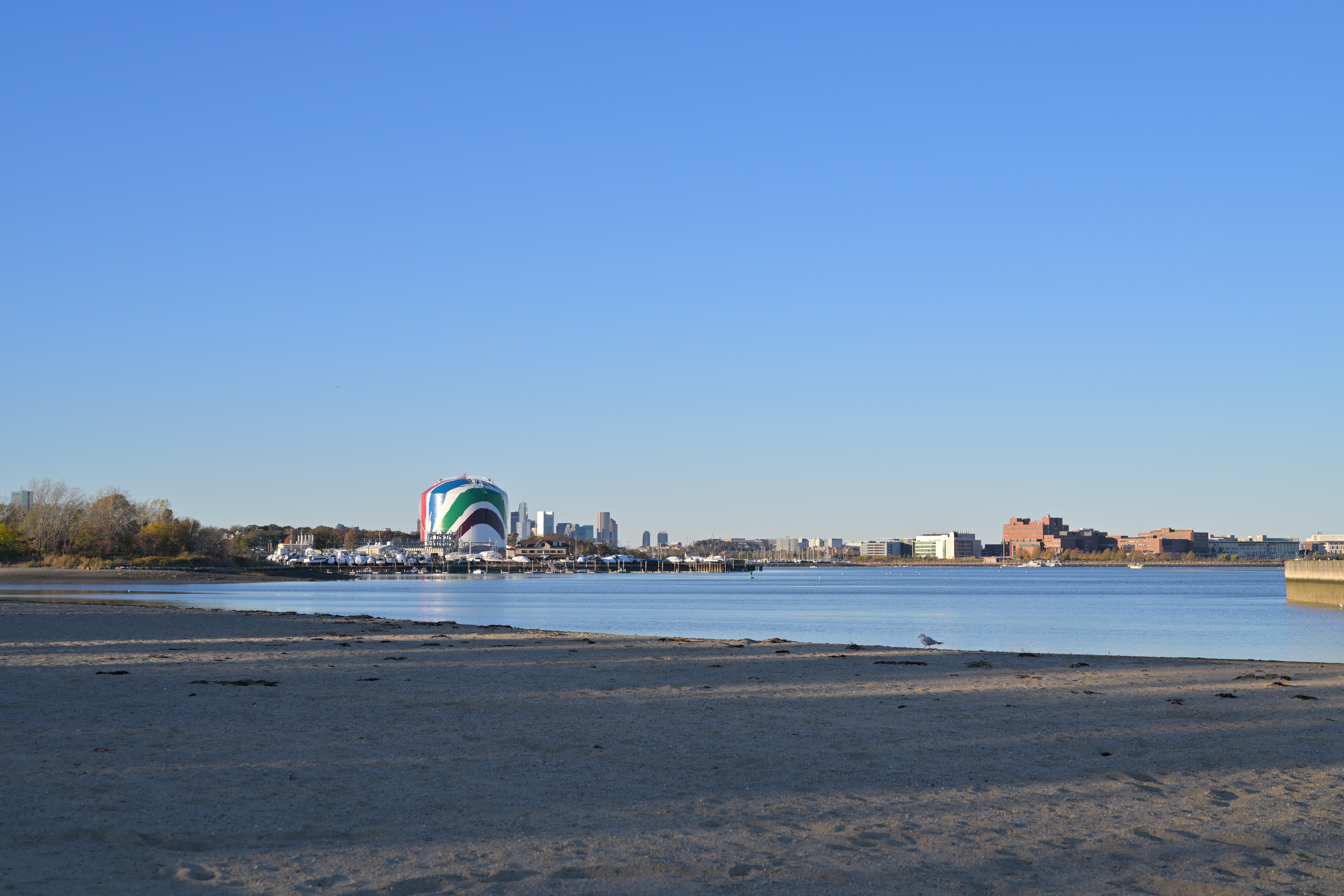
- Tenean Beach

- Location within Greater Boston area Location within Massachusetts Location within the United States
- Location: Dorchester, Massachusetts, United States
- Coordinates: 42°17′50″N 71°2′44″W
- Elevation: 10 ft (3.0 m)
- Established: 1962
- Administrator: Massachusetts Department of Conservation and Recreation
- Website: Dorchester Shores Reservation

Dorchester Shores Reservation has been used as a common name for several non-contiguous recreation areas along the extended mouth of the Neponset River at the seaboard edge of the Dorchester section of Boston, Massachusetts, United States. It encompasses Savin Hill, 27-acre Malibu Beach, 10-acre Tenean Beach, and 7-acre Victory Road Park. Savin Hill is adjacent to Malibu Beach and has been restored to its original Olmsted Brothers design. The reservation is managed by the Department of Conservation and Recreation.

== Climate change mitigation ==
In October 2018, Boston Mayor Marty Walsh announced a comprehensive climate change adaptation proposal to protect the Boston Harbor coastline from flooding, and in October 2020, the Walsh administration released a 174-page climate change adaptation report for the Boston Harbor coastline in Dorchester. In February 2022, Massachusetts Governor Charlie Baker announced an $8.2 million project to construct a 0.7-mile shared-use path from Tenean Beach to Morrissey Boulevard and that will connect the Boston Harborwalk with the Lower Neponset River Trail on the Neponset River Reservation via Morrissey (including a 670-foot boardwalk in the salt marshes near the National Grid gas tank) that will be included in the $9.5 billion in federal funds the state government received under the Infrastructure Investment and Jobs Act.

In August 2022, Governor Baker signed into law a bill co-sponsored by Massachusetts State Senator Nick Collins and Massachusetts State Representative Daniel J. Hunt establishing a Dorchester Shores Reservation and Parks Trust Fund administered by the Massachusetts Secretary of Energy and Environmental Affairs to ensure the long-term conservation, maintenance, and improvement of Reservation properties. In March 2023, the Boston Planning & Development Agency (BPDA) announced a virtual public meeting to solicit public feedback from residents for an initiative titled the "Dorchester Resilient Waterfront Project at Tenean Beach/Conley Street" (that will involve staff from the Massachusetts Department of Transportation, the DCR, and the Massachusetts Bay Transportation Authority) to formulate a climate change adaptation proposal for submission by the following June 30 to address coastal flooding due to sea level rise on Tenean Beach and Conley Street. In July 2023, the BPDA issued its final report for the Dorchester Resilient Waterfront Project at Tenean Beach/Conley Street.

== Activities and amenities ==
- Malibu Beach: Swimming and bathhouse.
- Savin Hill Beach: Swimming, sports fields, tot-lot playground.
- Tenean Beach: Swimming, playground, tennis and basketball courts.
- Victory Road Park: The park occupies a reclaimed landfill and is designed for passive use.
- The reservation also offers picnicking, restrooms, concessions, fishing, first aid, and information.

== See also ==
- List of parks in Boston
