= William J. Day =

American politician

William J. Day (November 18, 1876 – May 30, 1950) was a judge from South Boston, Massachusetts and the ninth state deputy of the Massachusetts Knights of Columbus. William J. Day Boulevard is named for him.

Day was born on November 18, 1876, in South Boston. He received a bachelor's degree from Boston College and a law degree from Boston University. He was admitted to the bar in 1902. In 1914 he was appointed to South Boston Municipal Court by Governor David I. Walsh in 1914 and served as its presiding justice while Edward Lawrence Logan was serving in the military during World War I. Day also maintained an extensive law practice and his clients included First National Stores, Union Savings Bank, Mt. Washington Cooperative Bank, Boston Musicians Protective Association, and the Motion Picture Operators Association. His son, John T. Day joined the practice in 1948. His daughter, Louise Day Hicks, was also associated with the firm.

With his wife, Anna F. McCarron, Day was the father of five children. He died on May 30, 1950, in Dorchester, Massachusetts. He is buried at Old Calvary Cemetery in West Roxbury, Massachusetts.

== Works cited ==
- Lapomarda, Vincent A. (1992). The Knights of Columbus in Massachusetts (second ed.). Norwood, Massachusetts: Knights of Columbus Massachusetts State Council.
