= South Boston Boat Clubs Historic District =

Historic district in Massachusetts, United States

- U.S. National Register of Historic Places
- U.S. Historic district
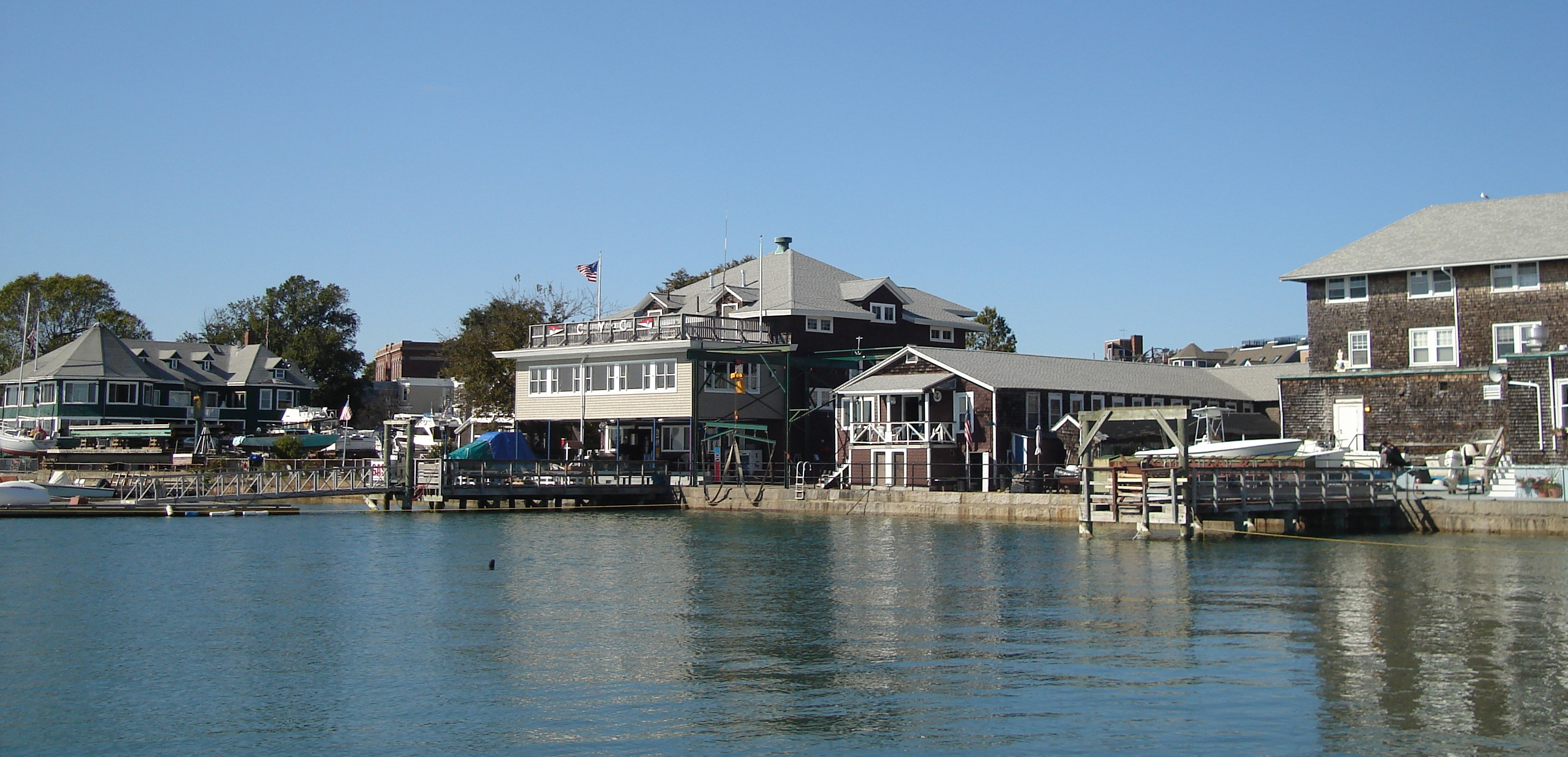

- Location within Massachusetts Location within the United States
- Location: Boston, Massachusetts
- Coordinates: 42°19′53″N 71°3′48″W
- Area: 3.5 acres (1.4 ha)
- Built: 1898
- Architect: Fernald, Albert C.; et al.
- Architectural style: Late Victorian, Late 19th And 20th Century Revivals
- NRHP reference No.: 05000936
- Added to NRHP: September 1, 2005

The South Boston Boat Clubs Historic District is a historic district consisting of clubhouse buildings at 1793–1849 William J. Day Boulevard in the South Boston neighborhood of Boston, Massachusetts. The district includes four late-Victorian era clubhouses, which were built on "made land" created by filling in mudflats from nearby construction projects. The oldest of the buildings, that of the Boston Harbor Yacht Club, was built in 1898, but may contain elements as old as 1870, when the Boston Yacht Club was founded.

The district listed on the National Register of Historic Places in 2005.

== See also ==
- National Register of Historic Places listings in southern Boston, Massachusetts
