= Dorchester Bay (Boston Harbor) =

Bay in Massachusetts, United States

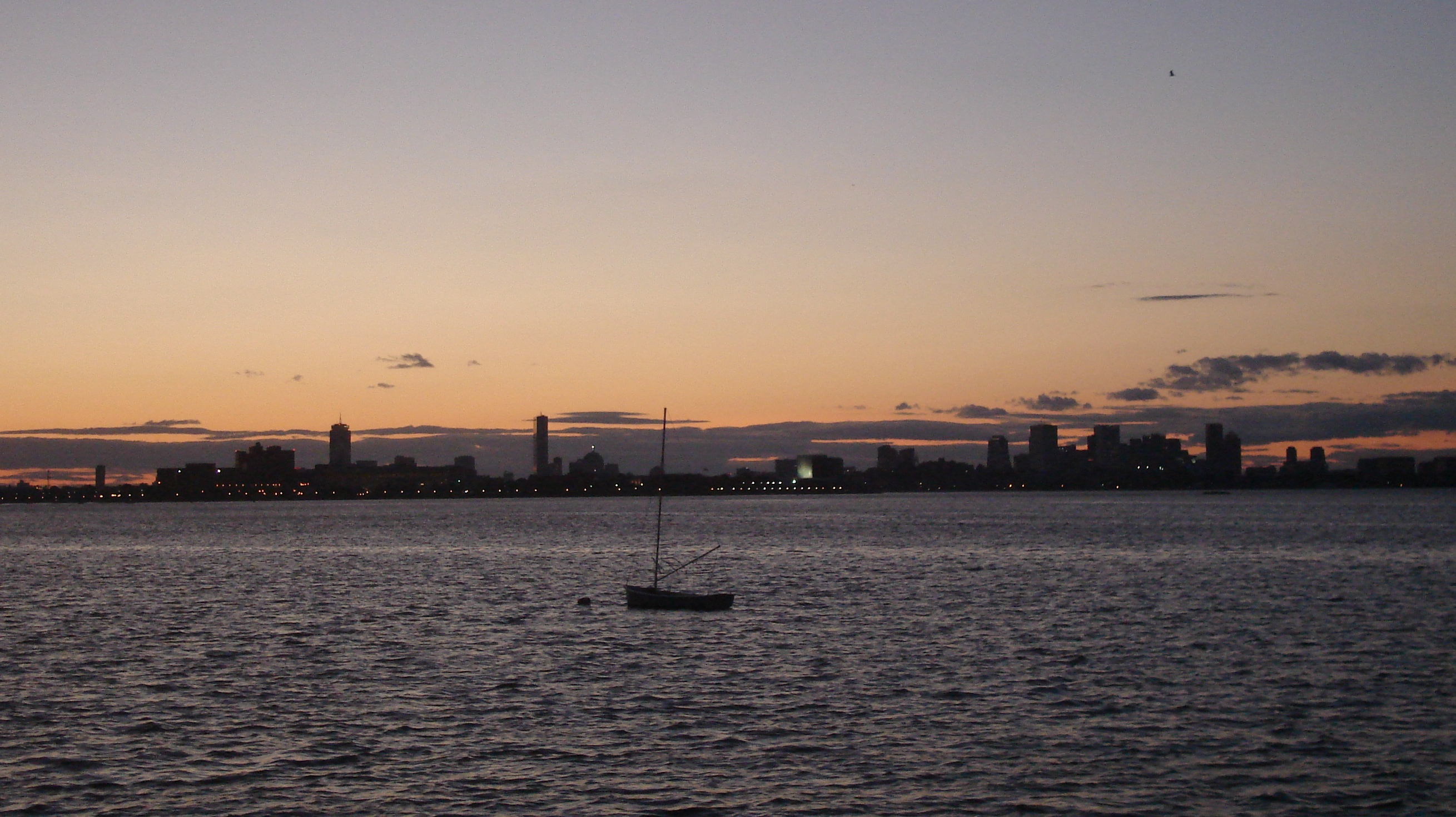
- Looking northwest from Quincy toward Boston across Dorchester Bay

- Dorchester Bay, upper left, and nearby features
- Location: Massachusetts
- Coordinates: 42°18′50″N 71°1′33″W

Dorchester Bay is the smallest of the three smaller bays of southern Boston Harbor, part of Massachusetts Bay and forming the south shoreline of the South Boston neighborhood and northeast shoreline of the Dorchester neighborhood of Boston, as well as the north shore of the city of Quincy in Massachusetts.

The bay is home to Thompson Island, one of the Boston Harbor Islands. The Neponset River empties into Dorchester Bay between south Dorchester and Squantum Point Park in Quincy. The John F. Kennedy Library and Museum is located on the west shore of the bay at the end of the Columbia Point peninsula. Day Boulevard, one of the Massachusetts Department of Conservation and Recreation parkways and part of the Metropolitan Park System of Greater Boston, travels 2.6 miles (4.2 km) along the northern shore of Dorchester Bay, offering panoramic views of the bay and islands.

The waters of Dorchester Bay include Pleasure Bay, Old Harbor, Western Way, Squantum Channel, Savin Hill Cove, and Dorchester Bay Basin.
