= Dorchester Reporter =

Weekly community newspaper in Boston

- Type: Weekly newspaper
- Owner(s): Boston Neighborhood News, Inc.
- Editor: Bill Forry
- Founded: 1983
- Headquarters: 150 Mount Vernon Street; Suite 560; Dorchester, Massachusetts, U.S.
- Website: dotnews.com

The Dorchester Reporter is a weekly community newspaper founded in 1983 by husband-and-wife Ed and Mary Forry to serve the Dorchester neighborhood of Boston, Massachusetts. Following Mary Forry's death, Bill Forry, son of Ed and Mary, assumed the role of managing editor while Ed Forry assumed the role of associate publisher, and Bill Forry remains the newspaper's current editor and publisher.

Bill Forry is married to former Massachusetts State Senator and State Representative Linda Dorcena Forry who is also currently an associate publisher of the newspaper.
