= Daniel J. Hunt =

American politician

Daniel Hunt
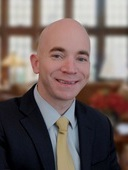

Member of the Massachusetts House of Representatives from the 13th Suffolk district
- Incumbent
- Assumed office April 16, 2014
- Preceded by: Marty Walsh

Personal details
- Born: Boston, Massachusetts, U.S.
- Party: Democratic
- Education: Boston College (BS); Suffolk University (JD)

Daniel J. Hunt is an American politician serving as a member of the Massachusetts House of Representatives from the 13th Suffolk district.

== Early life and education ==
Hunt was born in the Dorchester neighborhood of Boston. He graduated in 1999 from Boston Latin Academy. He earned a Bachelor of Science degree in business and management economics from the Carroll School of Management at Boston College and a Juris Doctor from the Suffolk University Law School.

== Career ==
From 2008 to 2011, Hunt was the chief of staff for Representative Daniel E. Bosley. He was an organizer for the John Kerry 2004 presidential campaign.

He is the former director of governmental affairs at the state Department of Conservation and Recreation. Hunt was elected to the Massachusetts House of Representatives in 2014, succeeding Marty Walsh.

Among Hunt's actions was the filing, at the request of a constituent, of Bill H.3719 on May 6, 2019 outlawing the use of the word "bitch". If passed into law, use of the word would carry penalties of $150 fine for a first offense and $200 or six months in prison for subsequent offenses. The bill was given a hearing by the Joint Committee on the Judiciary on October 22, 2019.

For the 2025-26 Session, Hunt sits as chairperson of the Joint Committee on Election Laws.
