= Castle Island (Massachusetts) =

Peninsula in Boston, Massachusetts, US

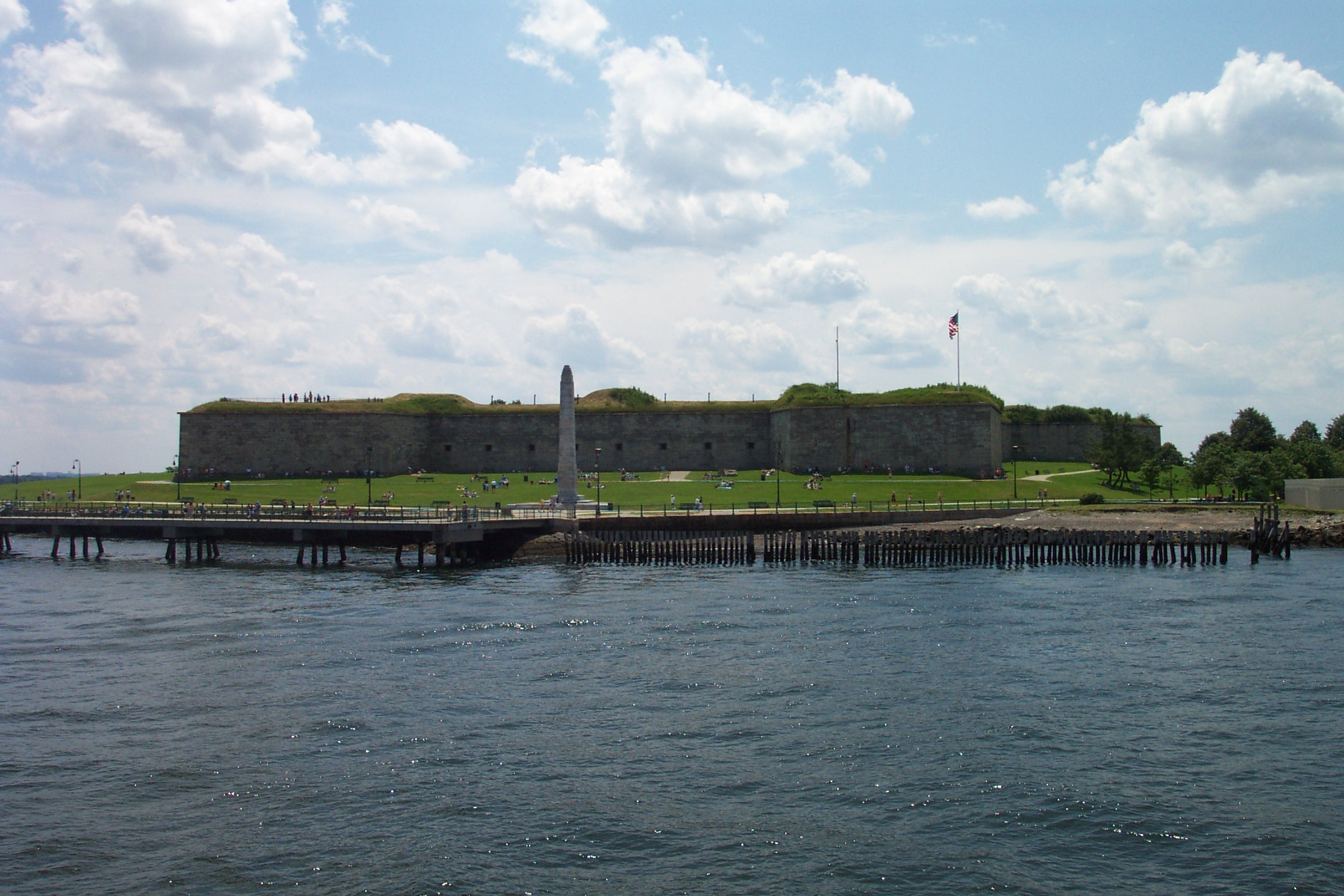
- Fort Independence at Castle Island

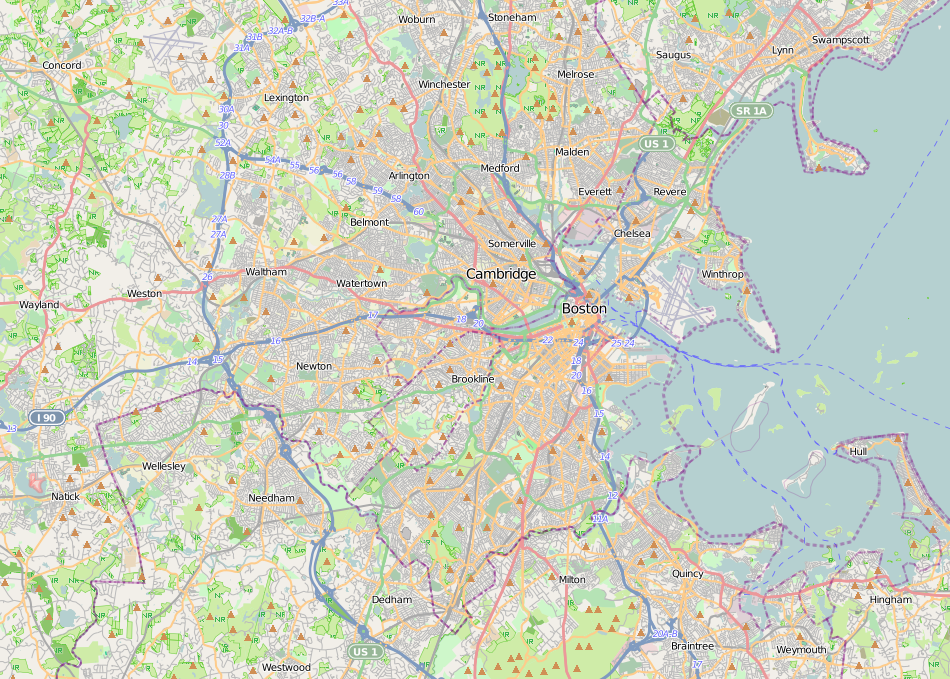
- Location within Greater Boston area Location within Massachusetts Location within the United States
- Interactive map of Castle Island
- Location: Boston, Massachusetts, United States
- Coordinates: 42°20′15″N 71°00′38″W
- Area: 22 acres (8.9 ha)
- Elevation: 33 ft (10 m)
- Administrator: Massachusetts Department of Conservation and Recreation
- Website: Official website

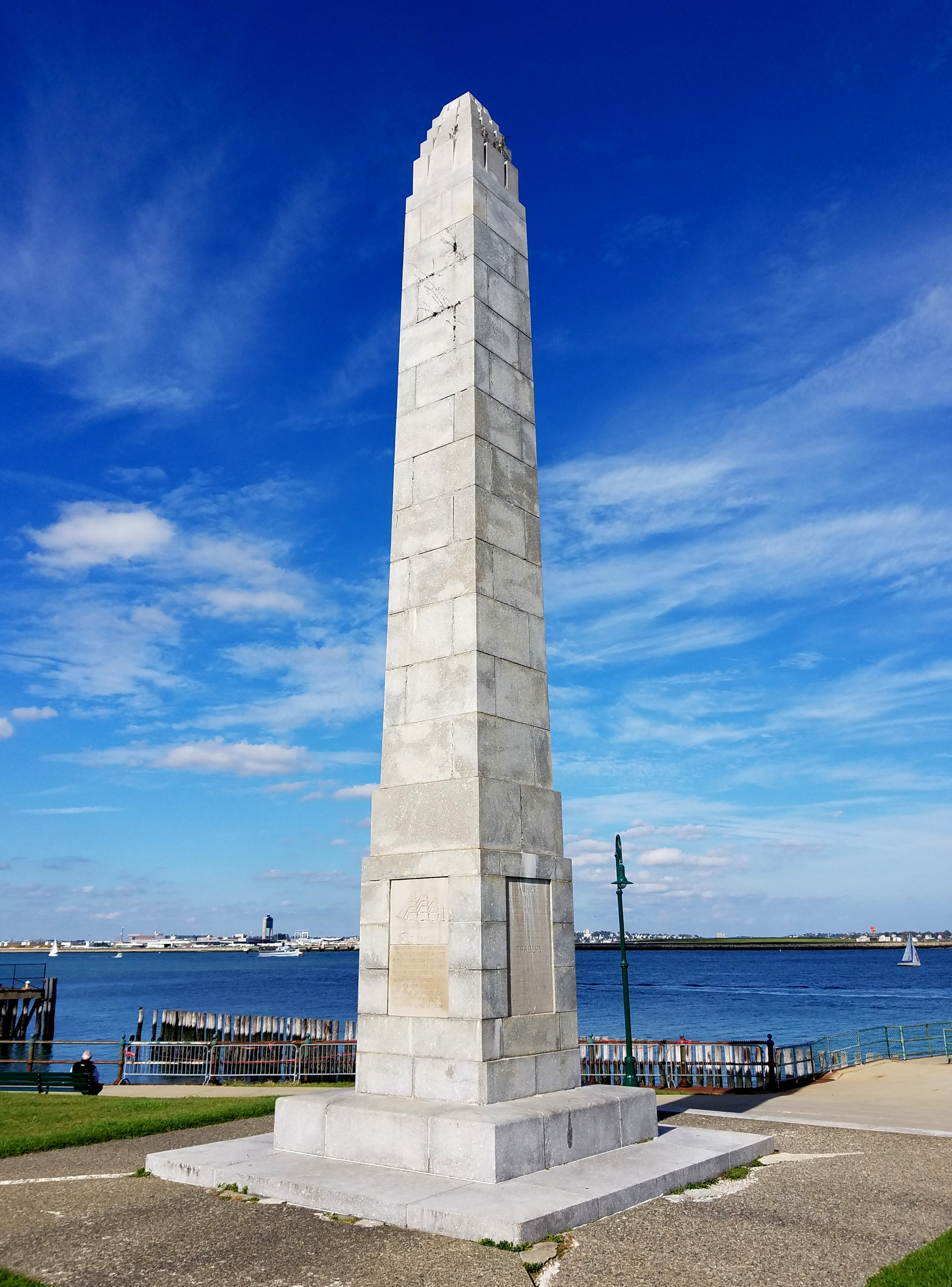
Donald McKay obelisk

Castle Island is a peninsula in South Boston on the shore of Boston Harbor. The landmass was an island until 1928, when it was connected to the mainland by a narrow strip of land. Castle Island has been the site of a fortification since 1634, and is currently a recreation site and the location of Fort Independence.

== History ==
=== 17th century ===
In 1632, a fortification was constructed on Fort Hill to defend the town. In 1634, Boston sought defenses farther out in the harbor, on one of the numerous islands which protected the port. In July 1634, the town decided to build a fortification on Castle Island. Deputy Governor Roger Ludlow and Captain John Mason of Dorchester supervised construction of the fort. After a structure was built on the northeast side of the island, the General Court resolved that the fort at Castle Island should be completed before any other fortification was begun. The fort was later known as Castle William and required incoming ships to recognize the fortification and would fire at them if they didn't offer recognition by raising their flag.

After the end of the King Philip's War the fortress was a site of internment of captured Native Americans who were shipped out to be sold into the Atlantic slave trade markets.

By the end of the century, the fort had been expanded to create a crossfire with the fort on Governor's Island.

Some people who worked at the fort included Thomas Beecher (ancestor of Henry Ward Beecher), a Castle officer; Captain Nicholas Simpkins, a first commander; Lt Edward Gibbons, a first commander; and Roger Clapp, who served for several decades as an officer.

=== 18th century ===
In 1701, Colonel Wolfgang William Romer, the chief military engineer for North America, came to Boston to fortify the harbor. Castle William was improved with brick walls and 20 cannon positions by 1705. During the 18th century, many people were imprisoned at the Fort, including privateer Pierre Maisonnat dit Baptiste from 1702–06.

In 1775, Prince Hall and fourteen other men of African descent became freemasons on March 6, 1775, on the island. They were initiated in a British Army Lodge, No. 441 of the Irish Registry by J. E. Batt, Worshipful Master, on what was then still called Castle William Island.

During the Siege of Boston, Castle William served as the main base of military operations for the British. The leaders of the Massachusetts royal administration took refuge there with their families, as did some prominent loyalists or "tories." Major Pelham Winslow of the prominent loyalist town of Marshfield, Massachusetts was the Commander of Castle William for a time during the Revolution. After the British Evacuation of Boston on March 17, 1776, Castle William was destroyed. After the fort was destroyed, Lieutenant Paul Revere was put in charge of rebuilding it. The rebuilt fort was named Fort Independence on December 7, 1797.

In 1785, the fort was designated as a state prison.

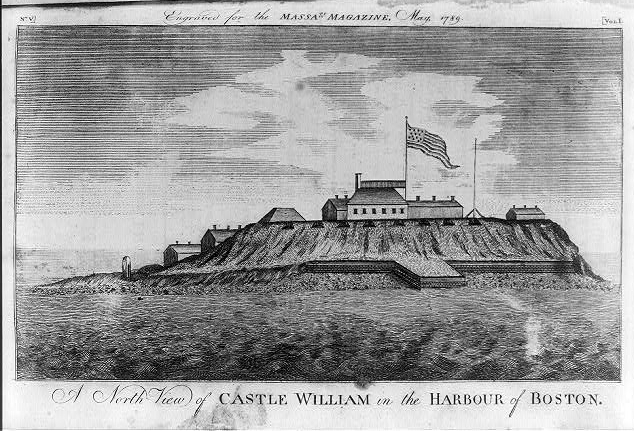
Castle William, as it appeared before its destruction in 1776

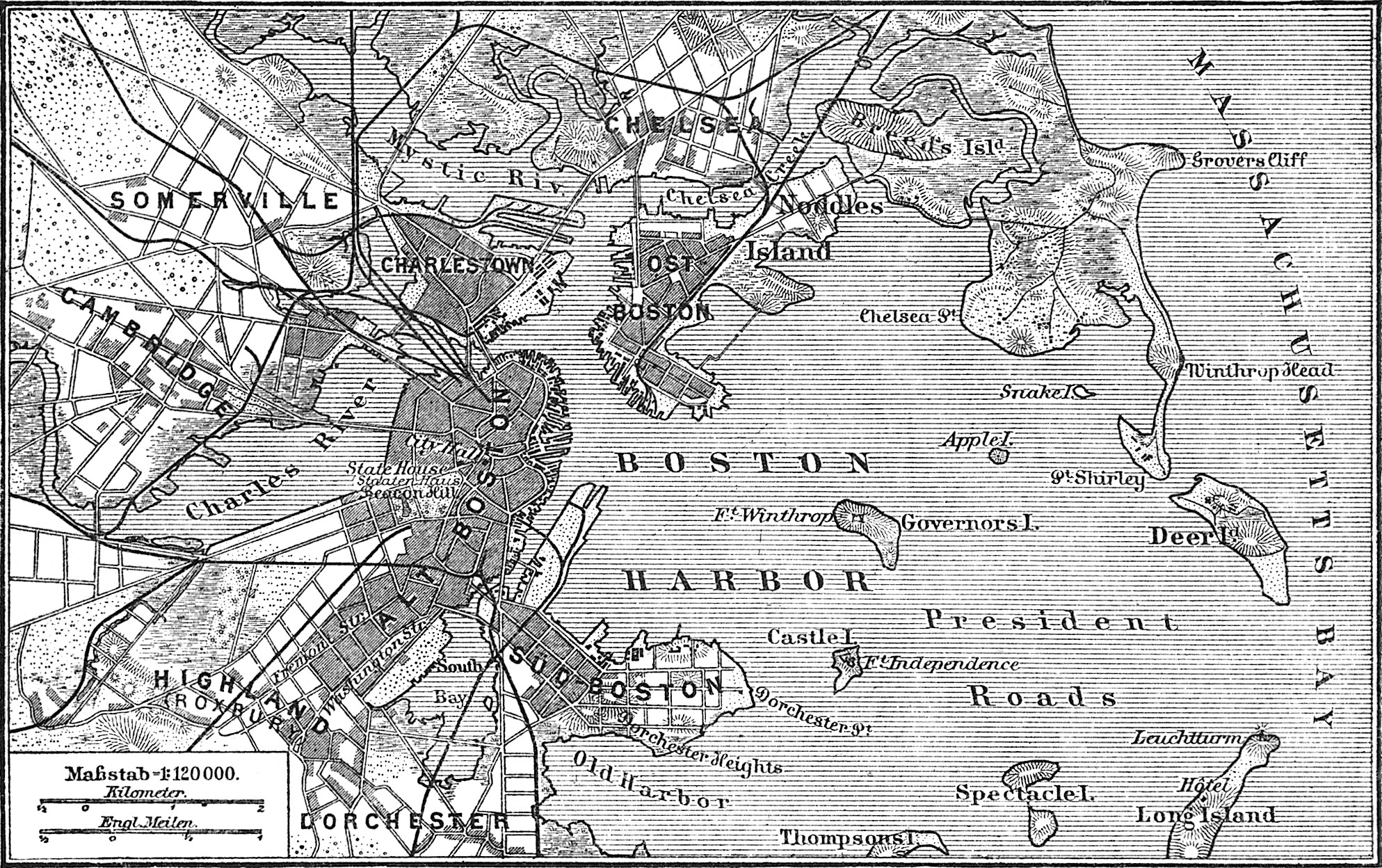
1890 map of Boston Harbor showing Castle Island as an island

=== 19th century ===
Beginning in 1801, a new fort on Castle Island was built by the war department. The fort helped protect Boston from British attack during the War of 1812. The island is also the site of a monument to Donald McKay, the builder of the famous clipper ships Flying Cloud and Sovereign of the Seas. The present structure, built between 1833 and 1851, is the eighth generation of forts.

Castle Island was originally some distance offshore, but land reclamation for expansion of port facilities has extended the mainland towards it, and it is now connected to the mainland by pedestrian and vehicle causeways. Today it is operated as a state park by the Massachusetts Department of Conservation and Recreation and is open to tours in the summer.

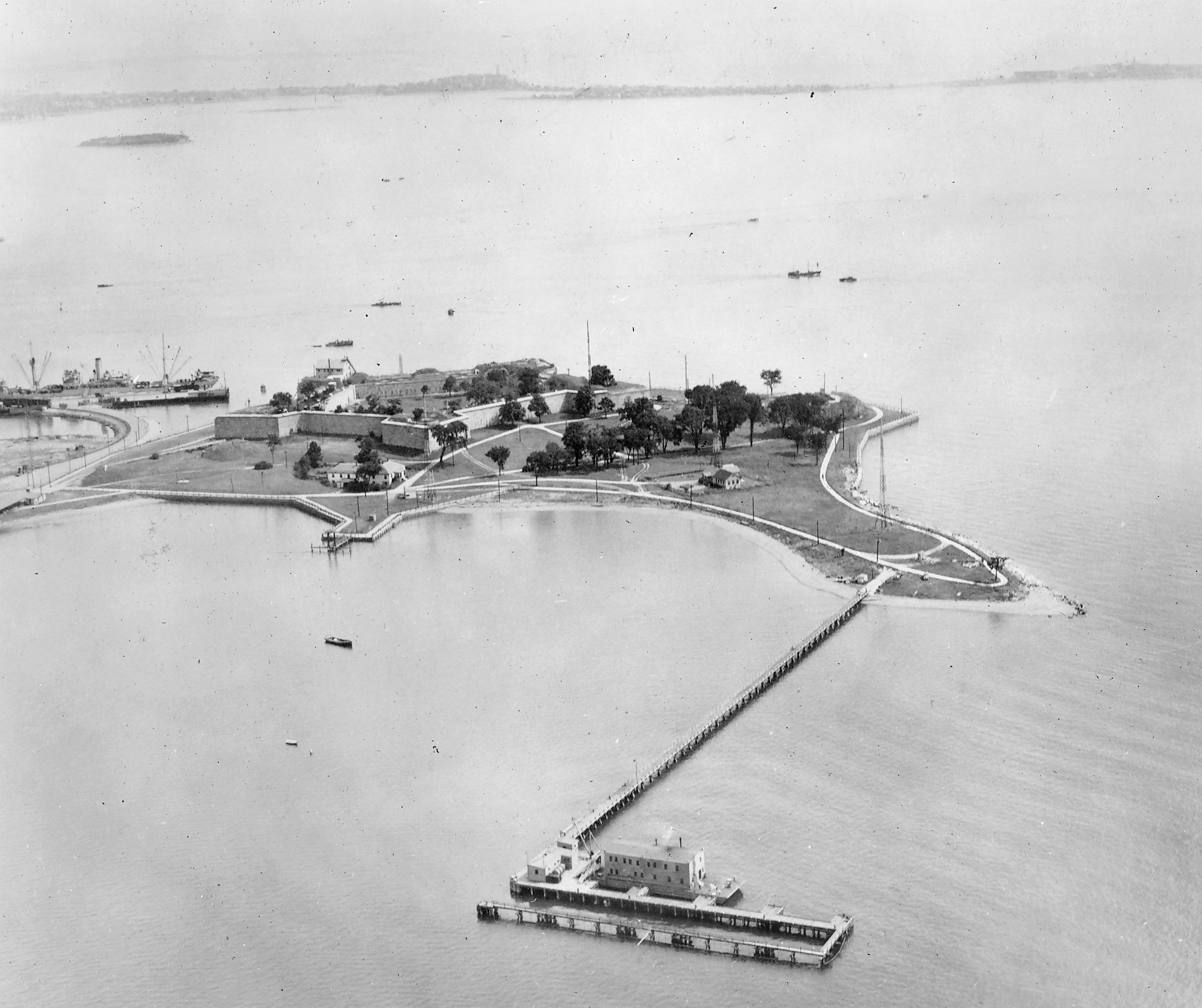
Castle Island during World War II

Local lore has it that an unpopular officer was walled up in the fort's dungeon following a duel in which he killed a more popular man. Edgar Allan Poe learned of the legend while serving on Castle Island in the Army, and his short story "The Cask of Amontillado" is said to be based on it.

=== 20th century ===
During World War II the U.S. Navy used the site for a ship degaussing station. In 1970, the fort was listed on the National Register of Historic Places.

== As a visitor attraction ==
Castle Island is open to the public year-round. Interpretive programs are conducted by the Castle Island Association in conjunction with the Massachusetts Department of Conservation and Recreation. Attractions include a playground, beach and swimming access, and restaurant Sullivan's. Tours of Fort Independence are conducted by The Castle Island Association on a seasonal schedule.
