= Boston National Historical Park =

National Historical Park of the United States

- U.S. National Register of Historic Places
- U.S. National Historical Park
- U.S. Historic district
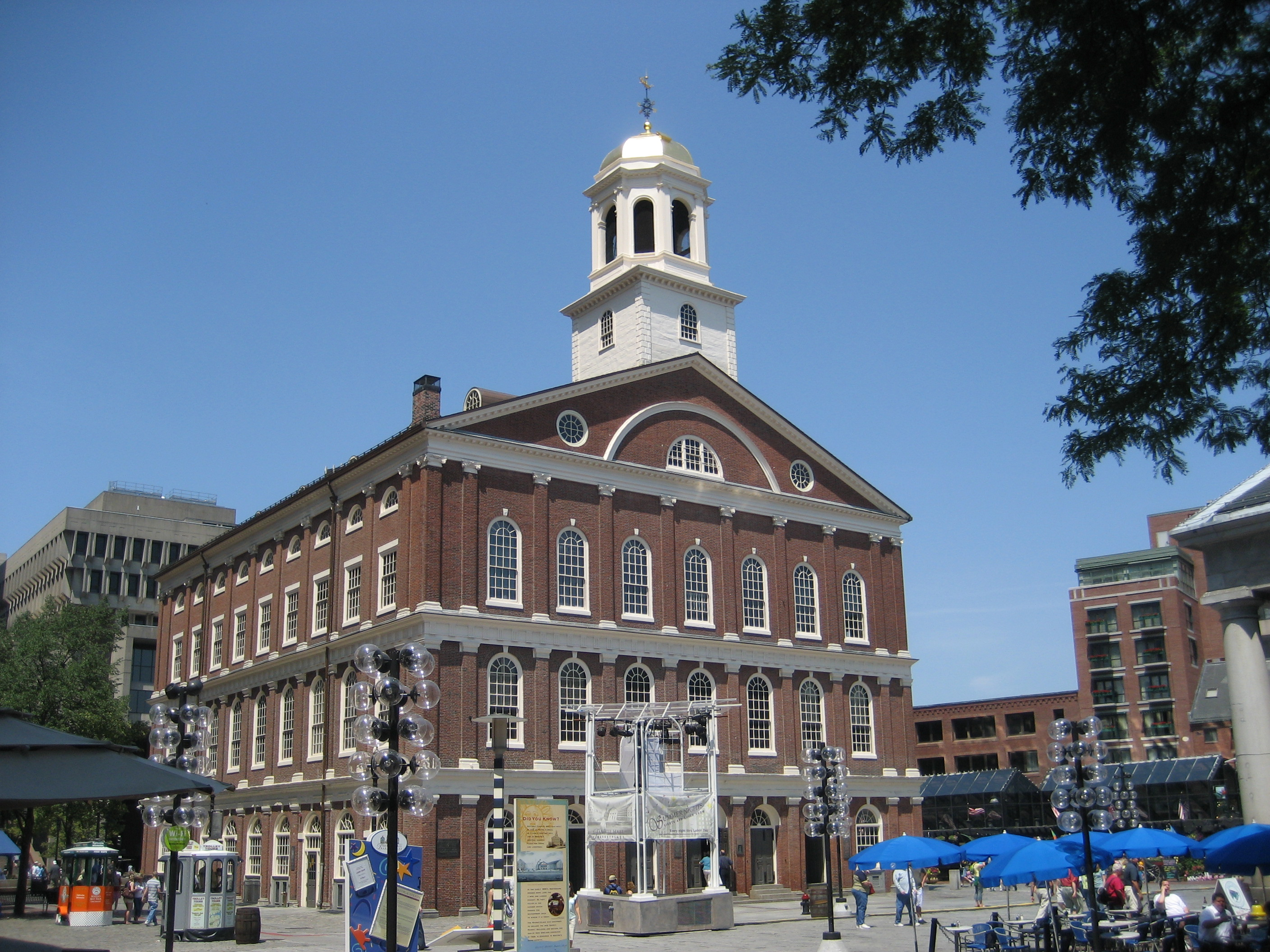
- Faneuil Hall

- Location within Massachusetts Location within the United States
- Location: Inner harbor at mouth of Charles River, Boston, Massachusetts, U.S.
- Coordinates: 42°21′36″N 71°03′23″W
- Area: 43 acres (17 ha)
- Built: 1776
- Architects: Alexander Parris, et al.
- Architectural style: Greek Revival, Colonial, Georgian
- Visitation: 2,123,246 (2022)
- Website: www.nps.gov/bost
- NRHP reference No.: 74002222

Significant dates
- Added to NRHP: October 26, 1974
- Designated NHP: October 26, 1974

The Boston National Historical Park is an association of sites that showcase Boston's role in the American Revolution and other parts of history. It was designated a national park on October 1, 1974, and is also a historic district. Seven of the eight sites are connected by the Freedom Trail, a walking tour of downtown Boston. All eight properties are National Historic Landmarks.

Five of the sites that make up the park are neither owned nor operated by the National Park Service, and operate through cooperative agreements established upon the park's creation. The park service operates visitor centers in Faneuil Hall and at the Charlestown Navy Yard.

Boston National Historical Park, along with Boston African American and Boston Harbor Islands, comprise the National Parks of Boston, all under the same superintendent.

== Locations ==
=== Park properties ===
==== Bunker Hill Monument ====
The Bunker Hill Monument, located at the top of Breed's Hill in the Charlestown neighborhood of Boston, is a granite obelisk built to commemorate the Battle of Bunker Hill, fought June 17, 1775. Work started in 1825, and the obelisk was dedicated in 1843. The property is owned and administered by the National Park Service.

The NPS operates a small museum dedicated to the battle of Bunker Hill and other associated history, across the street from monument grounds. The museum has a large-scale diorama of the battle on the second floor.

==== Charlestown Navy Yard ====
Boston Navy Yard (also known as Charlestown Navy Yard) is located on the southern edge of Charlestown on where the Charles and Mystic rivers converge. Established in 1800, it continued to serve as a base of the United States Navy until it was decommissioned in 1974. The Navy turned part of the property over to the National Park Service in 1976, while the rest of the Navy Yard was turned over to the Boston Redevelopment Authority. USS Constitution, the oldest floating commissioned naval vessel in the world, is docked at the yard, and the adjacent USS Constitution Museum contains exhibits about the vessel. Next to Constitution is USS Cassin Young, a destroyer from the Second World War that is now operated as a museum ship.

==== Dorchester Heights ====
Dorchester Heights, located in South Boston, was fortified by General George Washington in March 1776, compelling the British to withdraw from Boston and ending the Siege of Boston. The pinnacle of Telegraph Hill, in Dorchester Heights, was converted into Thomas Park in 1854. The Dorchester Heights Monument was erected in the park in 1892. Dorchester Heights is the only site in the park that is not on the Freedom Trail.

=== Affiliated sites and Freedom Trail partners ===
==== Faneuil Hall ====
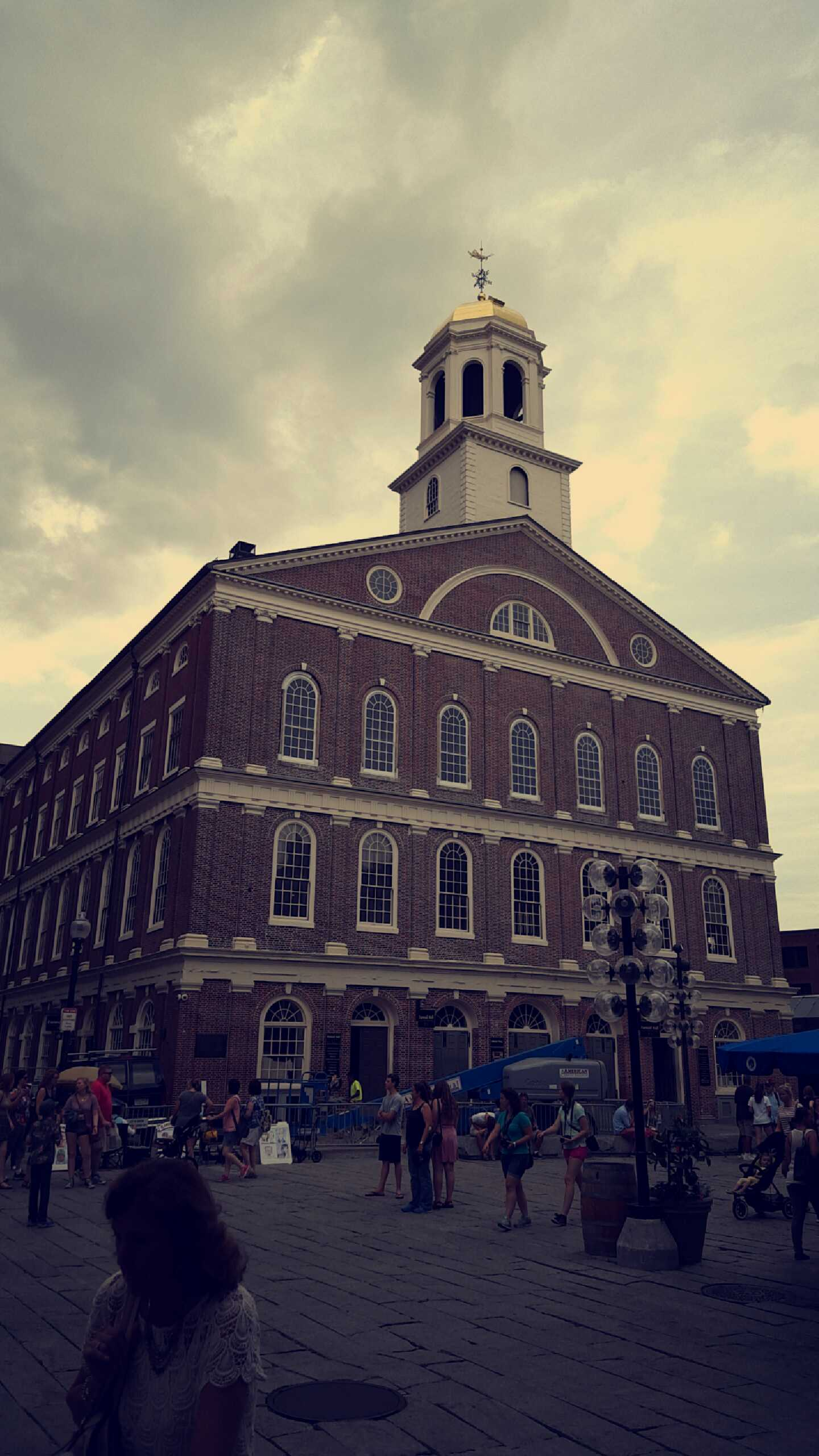
Faneuil Hall, 2015

Faneuil Hall, built in 1742, was the site of important pro-independence speeches. It served as Boston's town hall until Boston became a city in 1824. The hall is owned and operated by the city of Boston, with the park service offering talks in the Great Hall.

==== Old North Church ====
The Old North Church, built in 1723, was the location where Paul Revere directed two signal lanterns to be displayed on the night of April 18, 1775, prior to his "midnight ride". The church, the oldest operating in Boston, has an Episcopalian congregation, which still meets in the building. Old North Illuminated, a nonprofit organization, oversees tourism and preservation efforts.

==== Old South Meeting House ====
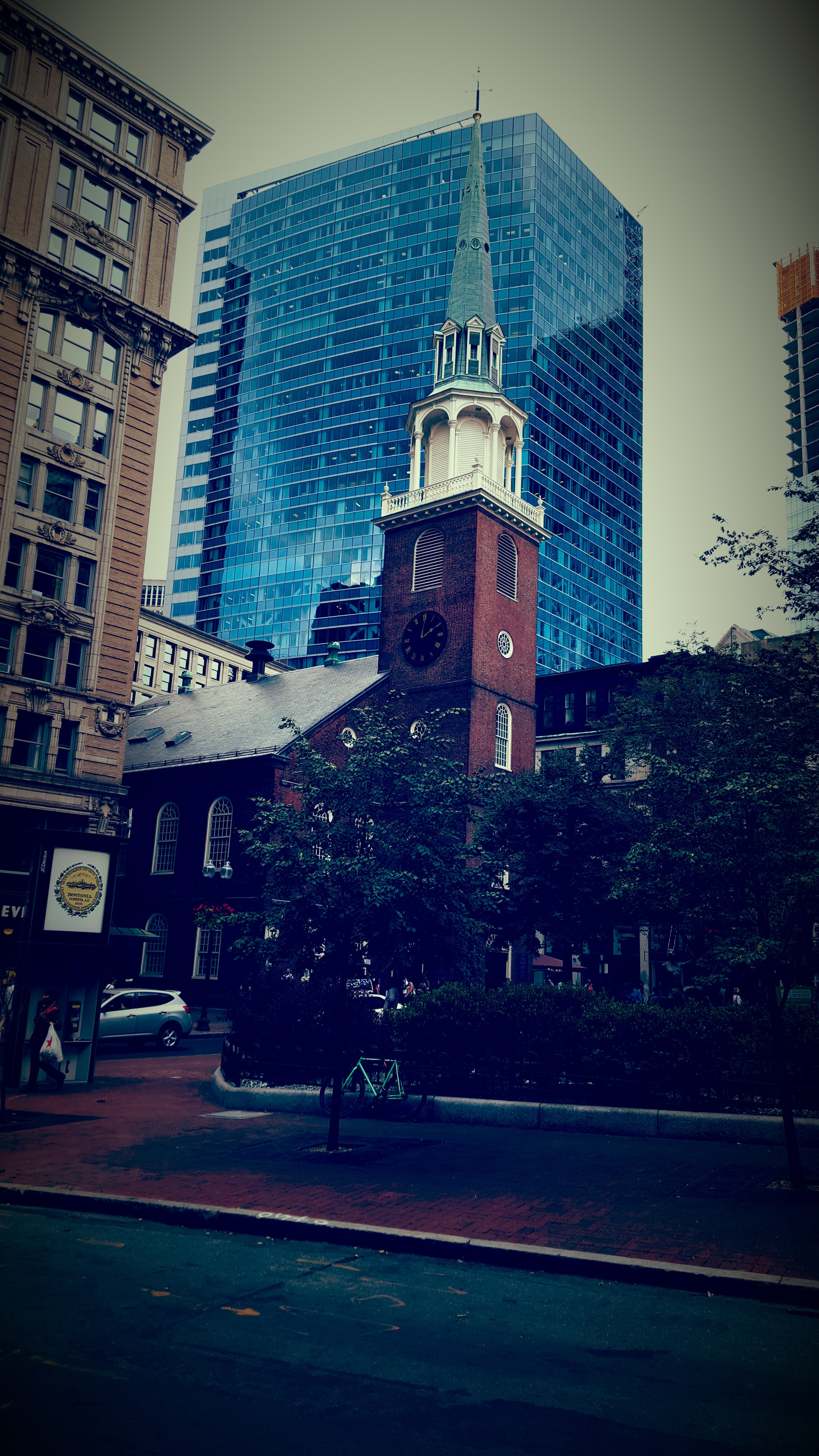
Old South Meeting House, 2015

The Old South Meeting House, built in 1730, is a traditional New England meeting house with a steeple; it is one of the few extant meeting houses that combine a traditional meeting house–style layout and a Georgian exterior. Old South was the site of numerous pre-revolutionary meetings, including one, attended by a crowd of at least 5,000, on the evening prior to the Boston Tea Party in December 1773. The congregation moved out to the new Old South Church in 1875, and in 1877 it became a museum operated by the Old South Association. The organization's successor, Revolutionary Spaces, still operates the building as a museum.

==== Old State House ====
The Old State House is the oldest extant municipal building in Boston. Built in 1713, it was the seat of the Colonial government, and afterward the State government until the Massachusetts State House opened in 1798. The Boston Massacre took place in front of the building in 1770. In 1881 it was leased as a museum to the Bostonian Society, which was formed specifically to preserve it. The society's successor, Revolutionary Spaces, still operates the city-owned building as a museum. The Boston Massacre is reenacted outside every year.

==== Paul Revere House ====
The Paul Revere House is one of the oldest surviving buildings in Boston. It was built by 1680 and was purchased by Paul Revere in 1770. The Paul Revere Memorial Association opened the house as a museum in 1908.

== Park Service activities ==
The National Park Service, in addition to managing its properties that are part of the park, operates visitor centers at Faneuil Hall (1st Floor) and at the Navy Yard. It offers guided tours of the Freedom Trail. The Navy offers tours of USS Constitution, which is adjacent to the Park Service's visitor center at the Navy Yard.

== See also ==
- National Register of Historic Places listings in northern Boston, Massachusetts
- Cassius Cash
