= Fortification of Dorchester Heights =

Military action of the American Revolutionary War

- Part of the American Revolutionary War
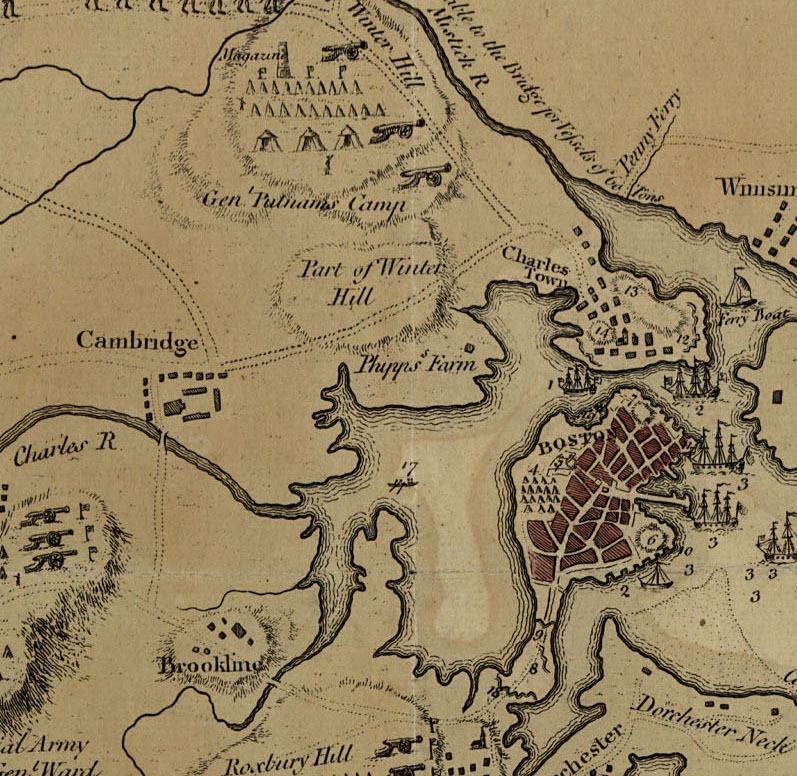
- Detail of a 1775 map of Boston, with Dorchester Heights at the bottom right
Date	March 4–5, 1776
Location	Dorchester Heights and Boston area 42°19′58″N 71°2′47″W
Result	British forces evacuate Boston on March 17

Belligerents
(United States) United Colonies	Great Britain

Commanders and leaders
(United States) George Washington (United States) John Thomas	(Kingdom of Great Britain) William Howe

Strength
2,000–6,000 on Dorchester Heights	10,000 in Boston

The Fortification of Dorchester Heights was a decisive action early in the American Revolutionary War that precipitated the end of the siege of Boston and the withdrawal of British troops from that city.

On March 4, 1776, troops from the Continental Army under George Washington's command occupied Dorchester Heights, a series of low hills with a commanding view of Boston and its harbor, and mounted powerful cannons there threatening the city and the Navy ships in the harbor. General William Howe, commander of the British forces occupying Boston, planned an attack to dislodge them. However, a snowstorm prevented its execution, so Howe withdrew instead. British forces and Loyalists who had fled to the city during the siege evacuated the city on March 17 and sailed to Halifax, Nova Scotia.

== Background ==
The siege of Boston began on April 19, 1775, in the aftermath of the Battles of Lexington and Concord, and Colonial militia surrounded the city of Boston. Benedict Arnold, a captain in the Connecticut militia, arrived with his troops to support the siege. He informed the Massachusetts Committee of Safety that cannons and other valuable military stores were stored at the lightly defended Fort Ticonderoga in New York, and proposed its capture. On May 3, the Committee gave Arnold a colonel's commission and authorized him to raise troops and lead a mission to capture the fort. Arnold, Ethan Allen, the Green Mountain Boys, and militia forces from Connecticut and western Massachusetts captured the fort and all of its armaments on May 10.

George Washington took command of the army outside Boston in July 1775, and Colonel Henry Knox raised the idea of bringing the cannons from Ticonderoga to the siege. Washington gave Knox the assignment of transporting weapons from Ticonderoga to Cambridge. Knox went to Ticonderoga in November 1775 and moved 60 tons of cannons and other armaments by boat, horse, and ox-drawn sledges along poor-quality roads, across two semi-frozen rivers, and through the forests and swamps of the sparsely inhabited Berkshires to the Boston area. Historian Victor Brooks has called Knox's successful effort "one of the most stupendous feats of logistics" of the entire war.

== Geography and strategy ==
The British military leadership headed by General William Howe had long been aware of the importance of the Dorchester Heights and the heights of Charlestown which had commanding views of Boston and its outer harbor. The harbor was vital to the British, as the Royal Navy under Admiral Samuel Graves (later under Admiral Molyneux Shuldham) provided protection for the troops in Boston, as well as transportation of supplies to the besieged city. The British agreed on June 15 to the plan of seizing both of these heights, beginning with those in Dorchester, which had a better view of the harbor than the Charlestown hills. It was the leaking of this plan that precipitated events leading to the Battle of Bunker Hill.

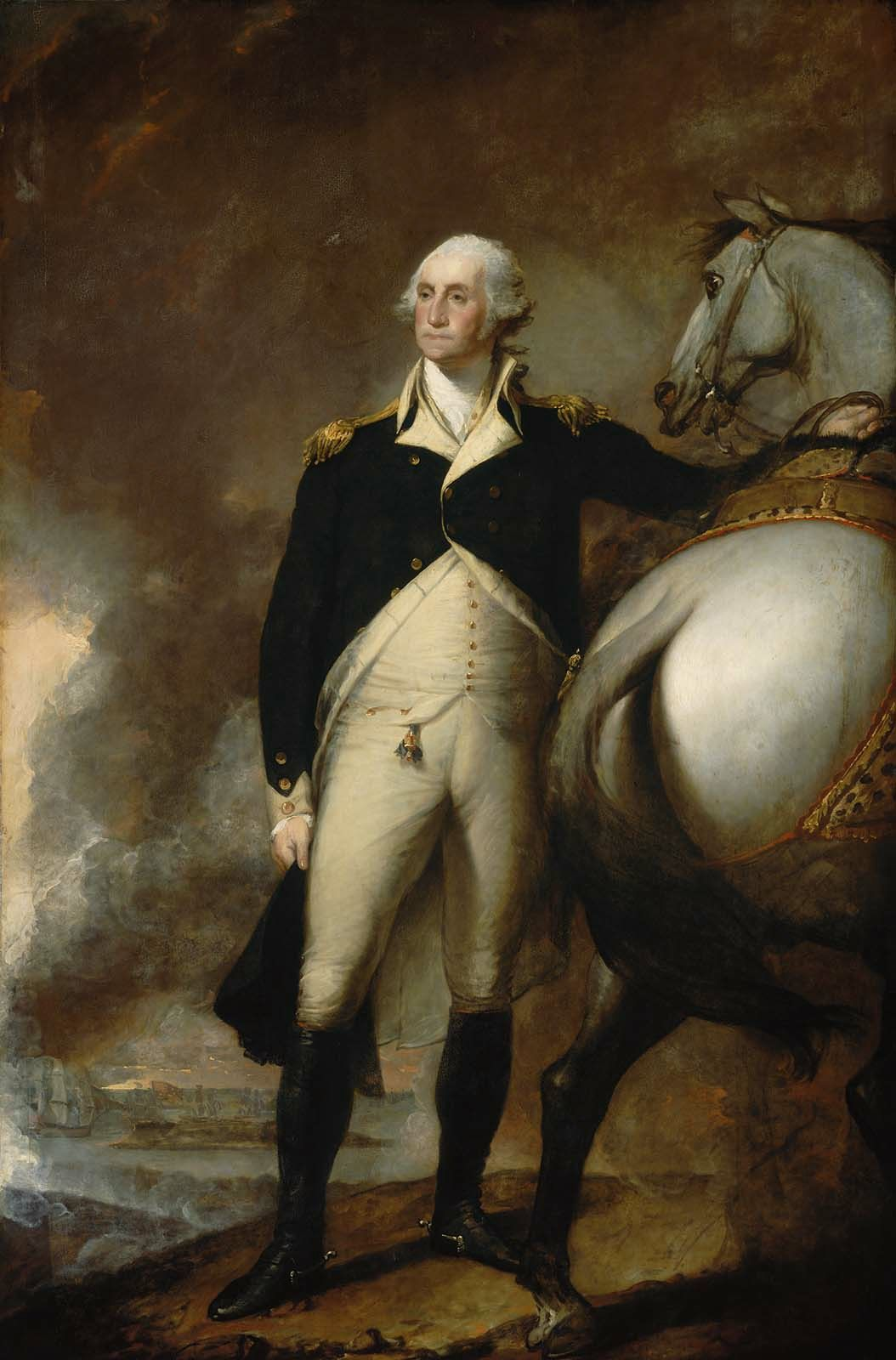
George Washington at Dorchester Heights by Gilbert Stuart, 1806

Neither the British nor the Americans had the daring to take and fortify the heights, but both armies knew of its strategic importance in the war. Washington took command of the siege in July 1775, and he considered taking the unoccupied Dorchester Heights but rejected the idea, feeling that the army was not ready to deal with the likely British attack on the position. The subject of an attempt on the heights was again discussed in early February 1776, but the local Committee of Safety believed that the British troop strength was too high, and important military supplies like gunpowder were too low to warrant action at that time. By the end of February, Knox had arrived with the cannon from Ticonderoga, as had additional supplies of powder and shells. Washington decided that the time was right to act.

== Fortification ==
Washington first placed some of the heavy cannons from Ticonderoga at Lechmere's Point and Cobble Hill in Cambridge and on Lamb's Dam in Roxbury. As a diversion against the planned move on the Dorchester Heights, he ordered these batteries to open fire on the town on the night of March 2; the British returned fire without significant casualties on either side. These cannonades were repeated on the night of March 3, while preparations continued for taking the heights.

On the night of March 4, the batteries opened fire again, but this time the fire was accompanied by action. This cannonade was continued on three successive nights, while the Americans made preparations to implement a plan devised by Rufus Putnam to break the long siege. The American objective was to get cannon onto Dorchester Heights and fortify the position. However, the ground was frozen, so digging was impossible. Putnam had been a millwright, and he devised a plan using chandeliers (heavy timbers, 10 feet long, used as frames) and fascines. These were prefabricated out of sight of the British.

General John Thomas, John Goddard, and about 2,500 troops quietly marched to the top of Dorchester Heights, hauling artillery, tools, and other military materials that had just arrived from Fort Ticonderoga to create the prefabricated fortifications and cannon placements. Hay bales were placed between the path taken by the troops and the harbor in order to muffle the sounds of the activity. Throughout the night, these troops labored at hauling cannon and building the parapet overlooking the town and the harbor. General Washington was present to provide moral support and encouragement, reminding them that March 5 was the sixth anniversary of the Boston Massacre. By 4 a.m., they had constructed fortifications that were proof against small arms and grapeshot. Work continued on the positions, with troops cutting down trees and constructing abbatis to impede any British assault on the works. The outside of the works also included rock-filled barrels that could be rolled down the hill at attacking troops.

"The rebels have done more in one night than my whole army would have done in a month."

— General Howe, March 5, 1776

Washington anticipated that General Howe and his troops would either flee or try to take the hill, an action that would have probably been reminiscent of the Battle of Bunker Hill, which was a disaster for the British. If Howe decided to launch an attack on the heights, Washington planned to launch an attack against the city from Cambridge. As part of the preparations, he readied two floating batteries and boats sufficient to carry almost 3,000 troops. Washington's judgment of Howe's options was accurate; they were exactly the options that Howe considered.

== British reaction ==
British General Howe looked over from Boston the next morning and remarked that "the rebels have done more in one night than my whole army would have done in a month." He did not know what had been going on in the woods just six miles from his army.

Rear Admiral Shuldham, commander of the British fleet in North America, declared that the fleet was in danger unless the position on the heights was taken. Howe and his staff then determined to contest the occupation of the heights and made plans for an assault, preparing to send 2,400 men under cover of darkness to attack the position. Washington was notified of British movements and increased the forces on the heights until there were nearly 6,000 men on the Dorchester lines. However, a snow storm began late on March 5 and halted any chance of a battle for several days. Shuldham reported the wind was too strong on March 5 for boats to row Howe's 2,000 men to attack the rebel fortifications. By the time that the storm subsided, Howe reconsidered launching an attack, reasoning that preserving the army for battle elsewhere was of higher value than attempting to hold Boston. By March 8, Shuldham wrote that they only had fourteen days rations unless more arrived, and was embarking ordnance and other stores to be sent to Halifax.

On March 8, intermediaries delivered an unsigned paper informing Washington that the city would not be burned to the ground if Howe's troops were allowed to leave unmolested. The British forces departed Boston by sea on March 17 and sailed to Halifax, Nova Scotia, taking with them more than 1,000 Loyalist civilians.

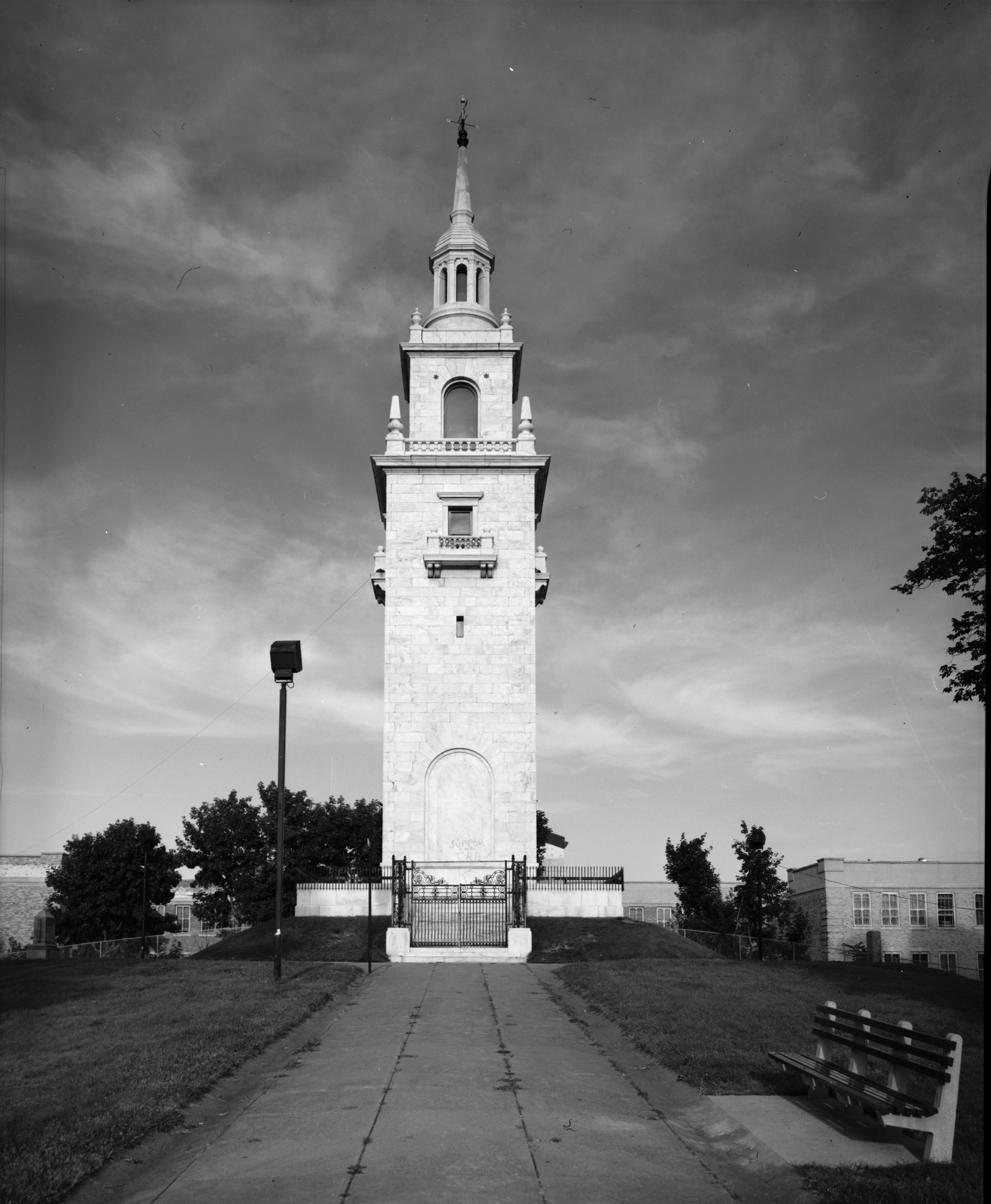
The Dorchester Heights Monument, completed in 1902

== Legacy ==
The fortifications on the Heights were maintained through the end of the war, and then abandoned. During the War of 1812, the Heights were refortified and occupied against potential British invasion. Following that war, the fortifications were completely abandoned, and, in the later years of the 19th century, the Dorchester hills were used as a source of fill for Boston's expanding coastline.

In 1902, following revived interest in the local history, the Dorchester Heights Monument was constructed on the (remaining) high ground in what is now South Boston. The large Irish population in the area was also instrumental in having March 17 (which is also Saint Patrick's Day) named as the Evacuation Day holiday in Suffolk County, Massachusetts, which includes the city of Boston.

The Dorchester Heights National Historic Site was added to the National Register of Historic Places in 1966, and in 1978 came under the administration of the National Park Service as part of Boston National Historical Park.
