= Cassius Cash =

16th superintendent of Great Smoky Mountains National Park

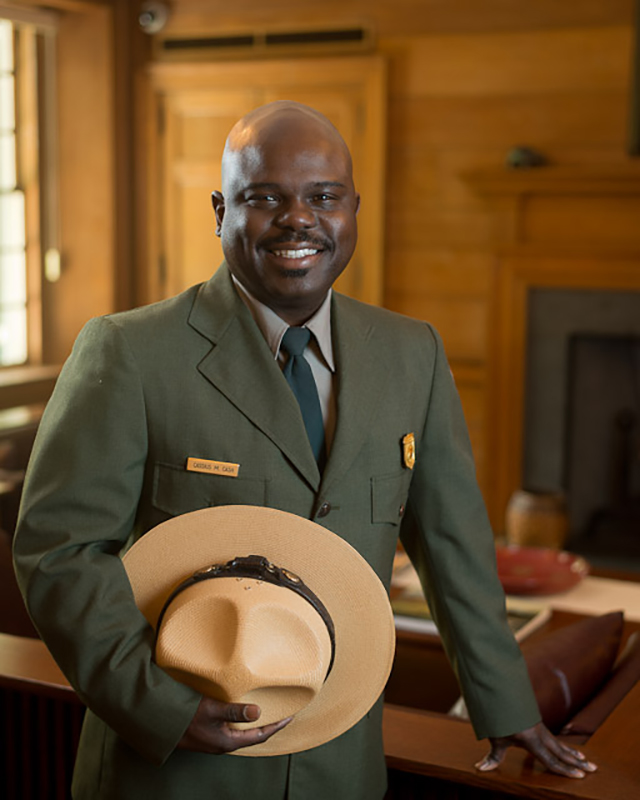
- Born: December 10, 1968 (age 57); Memphis, Tennessee, U.S.
- Notable work: Smokies Hikes for Healing
- Title: President & CEO of Yosemite Conservancy

Cassius Cash (born December 10, 1968) is the President & CEO of the Yosemite Conservancy. Prior to that, Cash was a career federal official who served as the 16th superintendent of Great Smoky Mountains National Park, encompassing the eponymous mountain range in eastern Tennessee and western North Carolina. He started his career in the U.S. Forest Service, in wildlife management, and nearly two decades later transferred to the U.S. National Park Service.

Cash is the former superintendent of Boston National Historical Park and Boston African American National Historic Site. In 2015 he was selected as the first African American superintendent of Great Smoky Mountains National Park, the most visited national park in the United States welcoming 12.5 million visitors in 2019.

== Early life and education ==
Cash was born in Memphis, Tennessee, in 1968, to a father who worked as a police officer in the Memphis Police Department, and a mother who worked as a cosmetologist.

Cash attributes some of his earliest interest in the natural world to watching Mutual of Omaha's Wild Kingdom documentary television series in his family home. His interest was further solidified through participating in outdoor excursions with Memphis Boy Scouts Troop 511.

After graduating from high school in Memphis, Cash earned a bachelor of science degree in biology from the historically black college, the University of Arkansas at Pine Bluff, and later studied wildlife management at Oregon State University. Cash is a member of Phi Beta Sigma and Sigma Pi Phi, Beta Theta Chapter.

== Career ==
Cash began his federal career in 1991 with the United States Forest Service as a wildlife biologist at the Gifford Pinchot National Forest in Washington State. He went on to work with the US Forest Service for 18 years in various leadership positions. He served as an administrative officer at Nebraska National Forest, district ranger at the Chattahoochee-Oconee National Forest, a civil rights officer at the National Forests in Mississippi, and was the deputy forest supervisor at the Rogue River-Siskiyou National Forest in southern Oregon before leaving the Forest Service to join the National Park Service in 2010.

Cash served as superintendent at Boston National Historical Park and Boston African American National Historical Park from 2010 to early 2015. While there, he worked with the City of Boston to open a new visitor center in historic Faneuil Hall, which now welcomes more than 5 million visitors a year. Cash also worked with several park partners to secure $4 million to reopen the African Meeting House, the oldest Black church still in its original location in the country. He and his team worked to rebrand Boston's Freedom Trail and the Black Heritage Trail as the Boston Trail to Freedom in order to merge the histories of the American Revolution and history of abolition and to “highlight Boston’s ‘total’ contribution” to US history. In 2014, Cash served as the deputy regional director and chief of staff in the National Park Service Northeast Regional Office. By the end of his five years of service in Boston, Cash was noted as having made “a significant impact” during his term as superintendent there.

In late 2014, National Park Service Regional Director Stan Austin named Cash as the superintendent of Great Smoky Mountains National Park. Cash stepped into the Smokies superintendent position in February 2015, taking over after a series of acting superintendents and the earlier departure of the park's previous permanent superintendent, Dale Ditmanson, who retired in January 2014. In 2017, Cash also served a temporary assignment as acting superintendent of National Mall and Memorial parks in Washington, DC, for 120 days.

Since arriving in Great Smoky Mountains National Park, Superintendent Cash has managed the park through a number of notable events including the disastrous Chimney Tops 2 Fire, the 2016 National Park Service Centennial, and Smokies Centennial Hike 100 challenge, the 2018 completion of the ‘Missing Link’ of the Foothills Parkway, and the 2020 arrival of the COVID-19 pandemic.

In 2022, Superintendent Cash introduced a groundbreaking proposal that would address the financial needs of the park as its visitation has consistently increased by 57% over a ten year period, while working with a flat budget and a declining workforce.

The initiative, called “Park it Forward,” proposed having visitors purchase a parking tag when recreating within the park. Though controversial in some surrounding communities, the ‘Park it Forward’ parking tag program was approved on April 4, 2022 with the support of the majority of the national public.

The parking tag requirement went into effect March 1, 2023. It was predicted that the program will generate between $6-8 million in its first year of implementation, with 100% of the revenue staying in the park. Several long-time supporters, including former Senator Alexander of Tennessee, have personally shared with superintendent Cash, “The Park it Forward initiative will be as impactful as it was for when Great Smoky Mountains National Park was created.”

Cassius Cash stepped down from the Great Smoky Mountains National Park in September 2024 to become the president and CEO of the Yosemite Conservancy in San Francisco.

== Awards ==
On May 24, 2021, Cash received the Agency Leadership Award from the Public Lands Alliance.

On October 21, 2021, Cash received the National Park Conservation Association's 2021 Stephen Tyng Mather Award. Cash received the award for his creation of the Smokies Hikes for Healing program in 2020.
