= Dorchester Heights =

Neighborhood in Boston, Massachusetts

- Dorchester Heights National Historic Site
- U.S. National Register of Historic Places
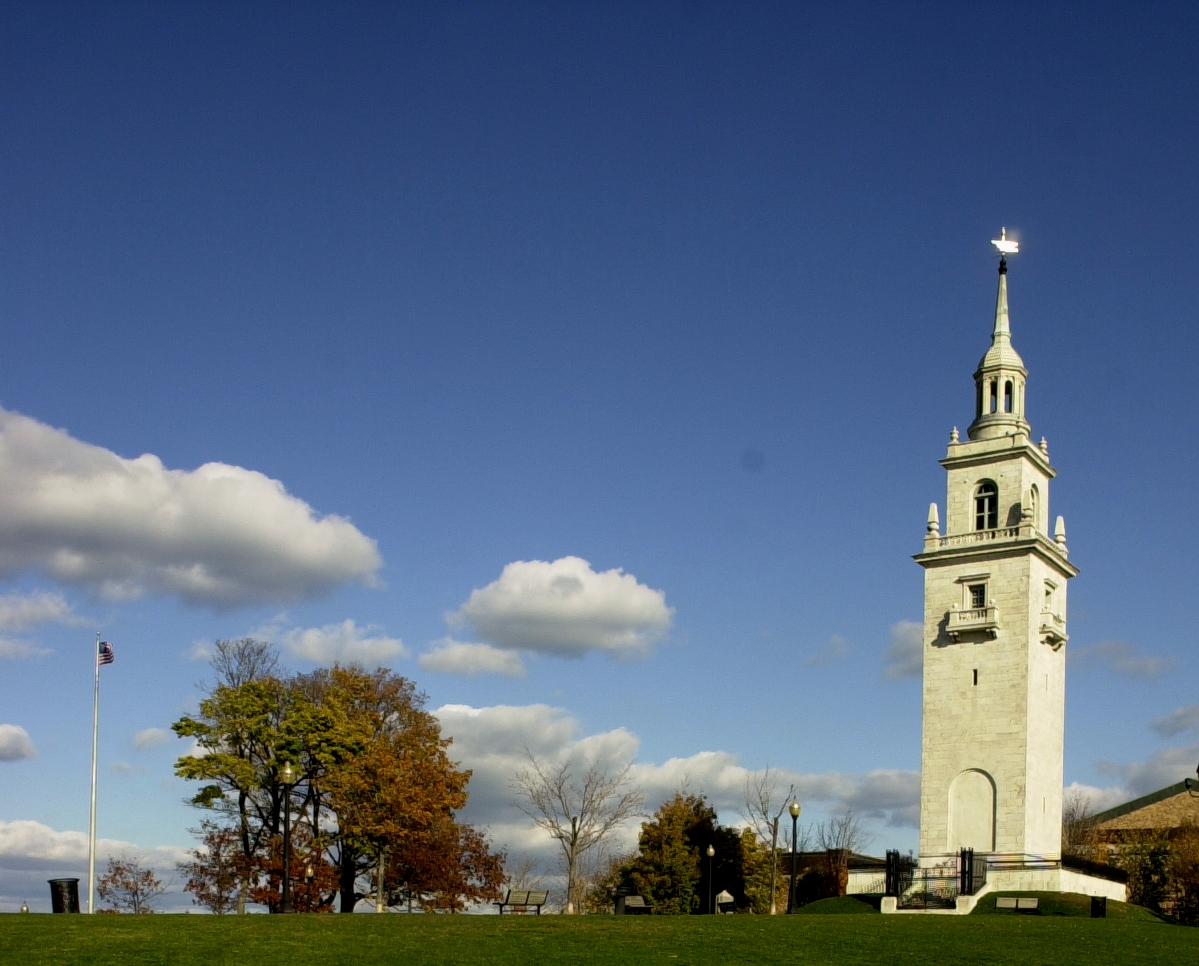
- View of Thomas Park and the Dorchester Heights Monument

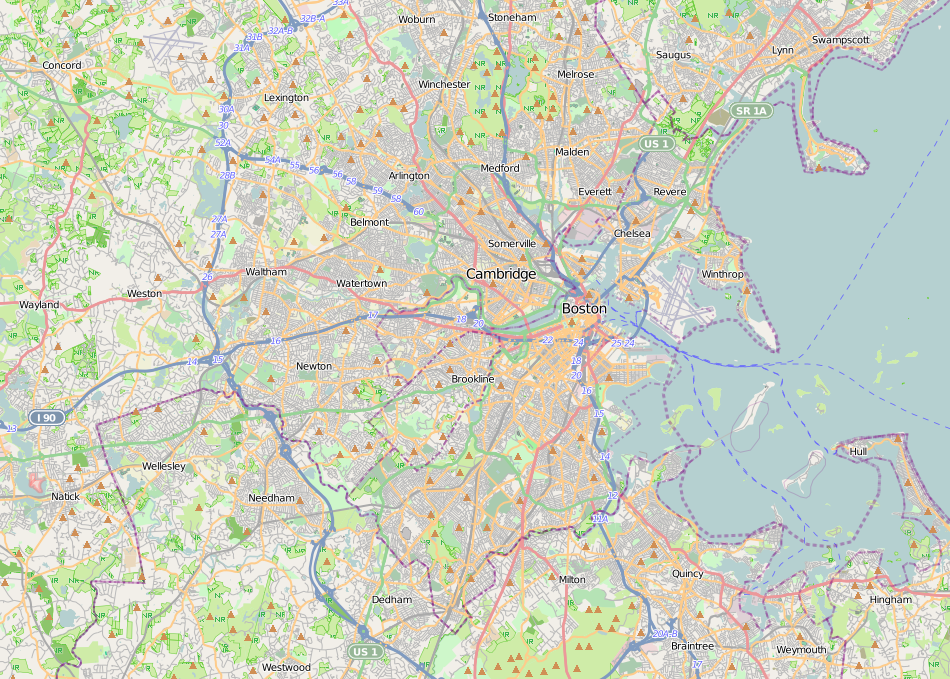
- Location within Boston Location within Greater Boston area Location within Massachusetts Location within the United States
- Location: South Boston, Boston, Massachusetts
- Coordinates: 42°19′58″N 71°2′46″W
- Area: 5.4 acres (2.2 ha)
- Built: 1776
- Architects: Peabody & Stearns
- Architectural style: Colonial Revival, Georgian Colonial Revival
- NRHP reference No.: 66000050
- Added to NRHP: October 15, 1966

Dorchester Heights is the central area of South Boston. It is the highest area in the neighborhood and commands a view of both Boston Harbor and downtown.

== History ==
Dorchester is remembered in American history for an action in the American Revolutionary War known as the Fortification of Dorchester Heights. After the battles of Lexington and Concord, Revolutionary sentiment within New England reached a new high, and thousands of militiamen from the Northern colonies converged on Boston, pushing the British back within what were then relatively narrow city limits. In June 1775 British soldiers under General William Howe attacked and seized Bunker Hill, but in the process sustained many losses. Following this encounter, the Continental Congress in Philadelphia gave George Washington the title of commander-in-chief and sent him to oversee the Siege of Boston.

The stalemate in Boston lasted for months, only breaking when Colonel Henry Knox returned from Fort Ticonderoga in New York, having led a team of sleds loaded with tens of thousands of pounds of artillery in winter from the fort across hundreds of miles to Boston. This added artillery gave Washington the firepower needed to make a decisive move. On the night of March 4, 1776, as 800 American soldiers stood guard along the river of Dorchester shores, 1,200 American soldiers occupied Dorchester Heights. They began working through the night to build structures suitable to defend against the British Army. A large portion of the artillery, pulled by oxen, was moved and installed, without being noticed by the British, at Dorchester Heights, a point of strategic importance due to its elevation and commanding view of all of Boston and Boston Harbor.

In response, Howe planned a counteroffensive to take the fortified positions on the Heights, but bad weather forced him to reconsider. The Royal Navy evacuated the British Army from Boston on March 17, 1776, along with many Loyalists. March 17 is observed as the holiday Evacuation Day in Suffolk County, Massachusetts.

== Notable places ==
- Dorchester Heights Historic District
- U.S. National Register of Historic Places
- U.S. Historic district
- U.S. Historic district – Contributing property
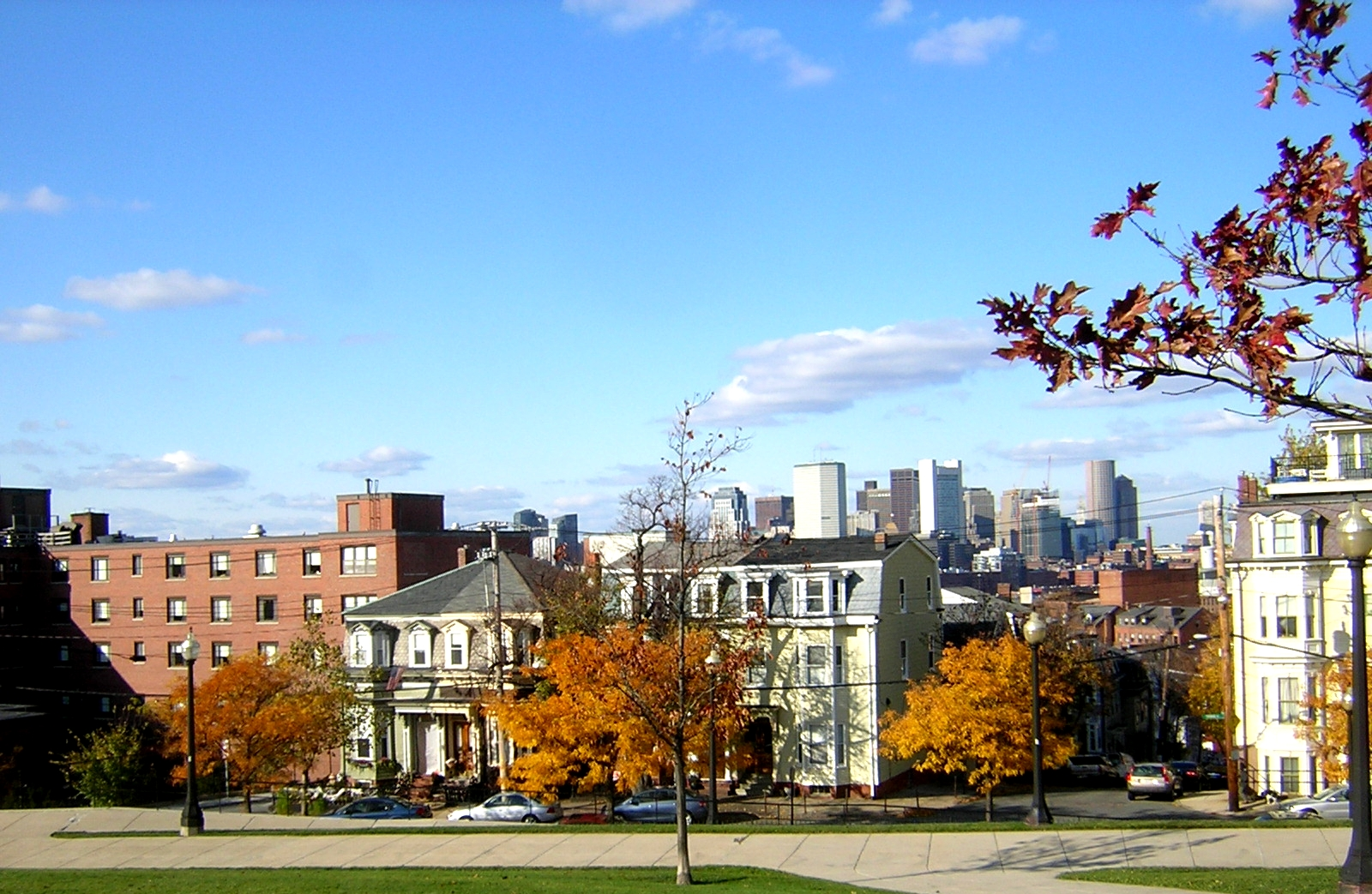
- Location: Roughly a one block area surrounding Telegraph Hill, South Boston, Massachusetts
- Area: 40 acres (16 ha)
- Built: 1776
- Architectural style: Federal, Greek Revival, et al.
- Part of: Boston National Historical Park (ID74002222)
- NRHP reference No.: 01001198

Significant dates
- Added to NRHP: November 01, 2001
- Designated CP: October 26, 1974

=== Historic district ===
A 40-acre (16 ha) area of Dorchester Heights, centered on Thomas Park and the monument, was listed as the Dorchester Heights Historic District on the National Register of Historic Places in 2001, encompassing the period of residential development of the area beginning in the later decades of the 19th century. The Dorchester Heights monument area was separately listed on the National Register in 1966.

=== Monument ===
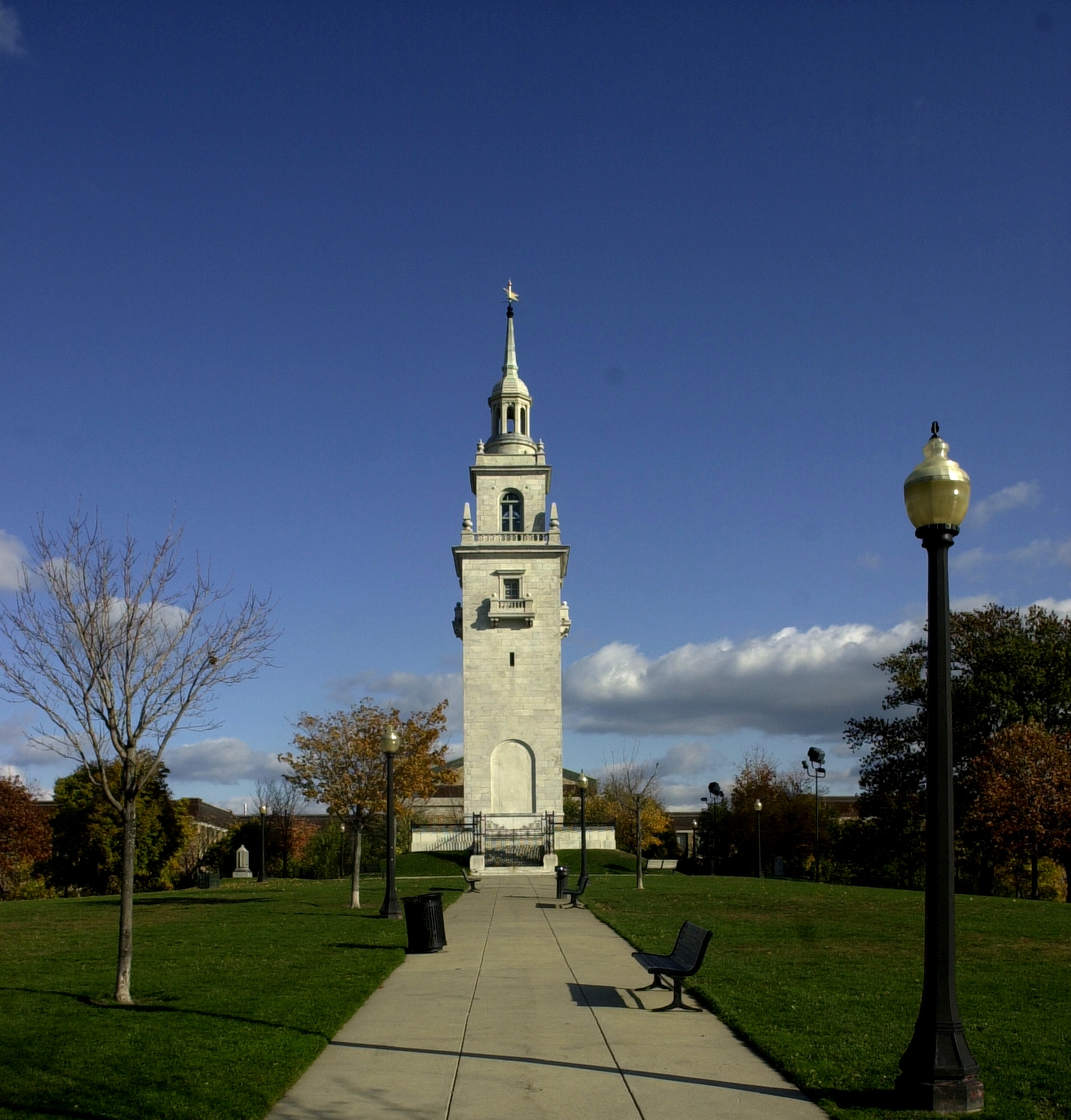
Dorchester Heights Monument

An area near the top of Telegraph Hill was used as the site of a reservoir to provide water to South Boston in 1849, with water provided from Lake Cochituate in the western suburbs. This reservoir was later filled in and South Boston High School was built on the site in 1901. The rest of the summit of the hill was developed as Thomas Park in the 1850s, a roughly elliptical park with ornamental plantings and walkways. During restoration work in the 1990s, archaeologists uncovered evidence of the Revolutionary War fortifications, previously thought to have been destroyed by the park's construction.

The Dorchester Heights Monument, located at the center of Thomas Park, was completed in 1902 to designs by Boston architects Peabody and Stearns. It is 115 feet (35m) tall, built of Georgia white marble capped with octagonal cupola and weather vane, and is generally reminiscent of a church steeple in the Federal style. The monument is now operated by the National Park Service as part of Boston National Historical Park.

== See also ==
- National Register of Historic Places listings in southern Boston, Massachusetts
