= John Goddard House =

Historic house in Massachusetts, United States

- U.S. National Register of Historic Places
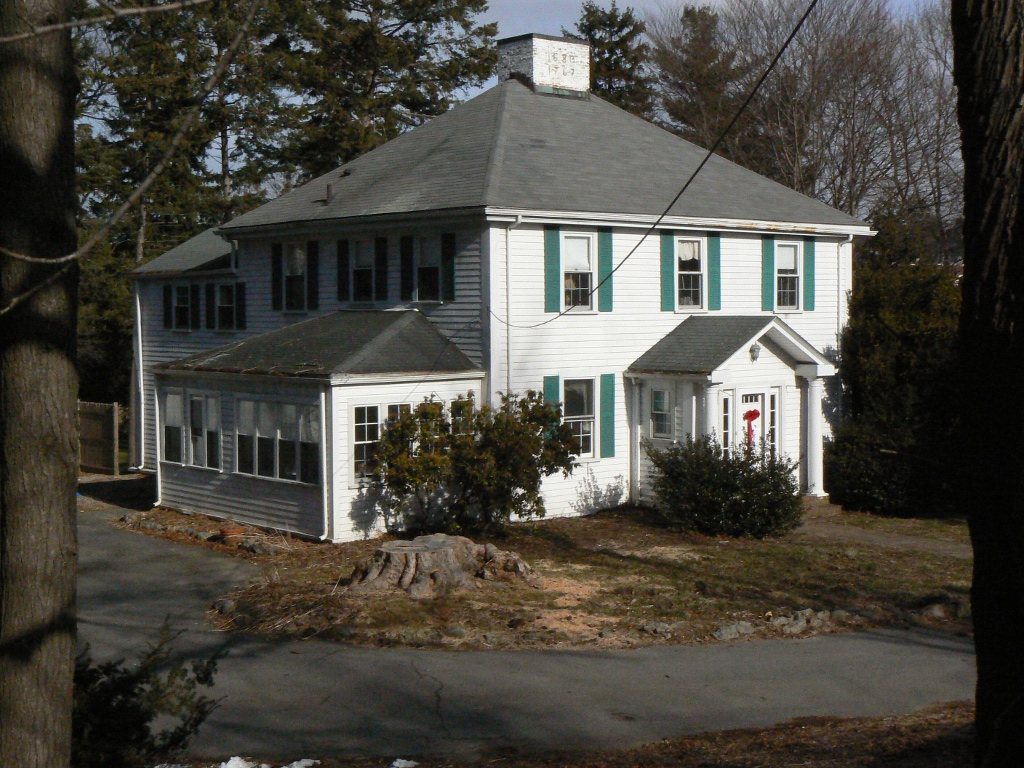

- Location within Massachusetts Location within the United States
- Location: 235 Goddard Ave., Brookline, Massachusetts
- Coordinates: 42°18′54″N 71°8′11″W
- Built: 1767
- Architectural style: Georgian
- MPS: Brookline MRA
- NRHP reference No.: 85003270
- Added to NRHP: October 17, 1985

The John Goddard House is a historic house at 235 Goddard Avenue in Brookline, Massachusetts, US. The two-story wood-frame house was originally built by Joseph Goddard in 1670 and re-built by his grandson John Goddard in 1767, a farmer. It is one of the few 18th-century houses in Brookline, important for the role it and its owner played in the American Revolutionary War during the Siege of Boston in 1776. The house was added to the National Register of Historic Places in 1985.

== Description and history ==
The Goddard House is set on the north side of Goddard Avenue, opposite the northern border of Larz Anderson Park in southeastern Brookline. It is a roughly square wood-frame house, with a hip roof, central chimney, and a three-bay facade with a projecting gabled vestibule. The interior retains period fixtures, including wall paneling, doors, and hardware.

The house was built in 1767 by John Goddard on land originally purchased by his grandfather Joseph. Goddard, a teamster, was active in local civic affairs, notably serving in the Massachusetts Provincial Congress prior to the American Revolutionary War in 1775. Goddard's property was one of several places in Massachusetts used by rebellious colonists for the storage of munitions (probably in the barn, since demolished). During the Siege of Boston, Goddard acted as wagon-master general to the Continental Army during the Fortification of Dorchester Heights, a night-time act that required the wagons to be rendered as quiet as possible to avoid notice. After the siege lifted and the British troops left Boston, Goddard refused George Washington's offer to remain in military service due to his duty to his large family.

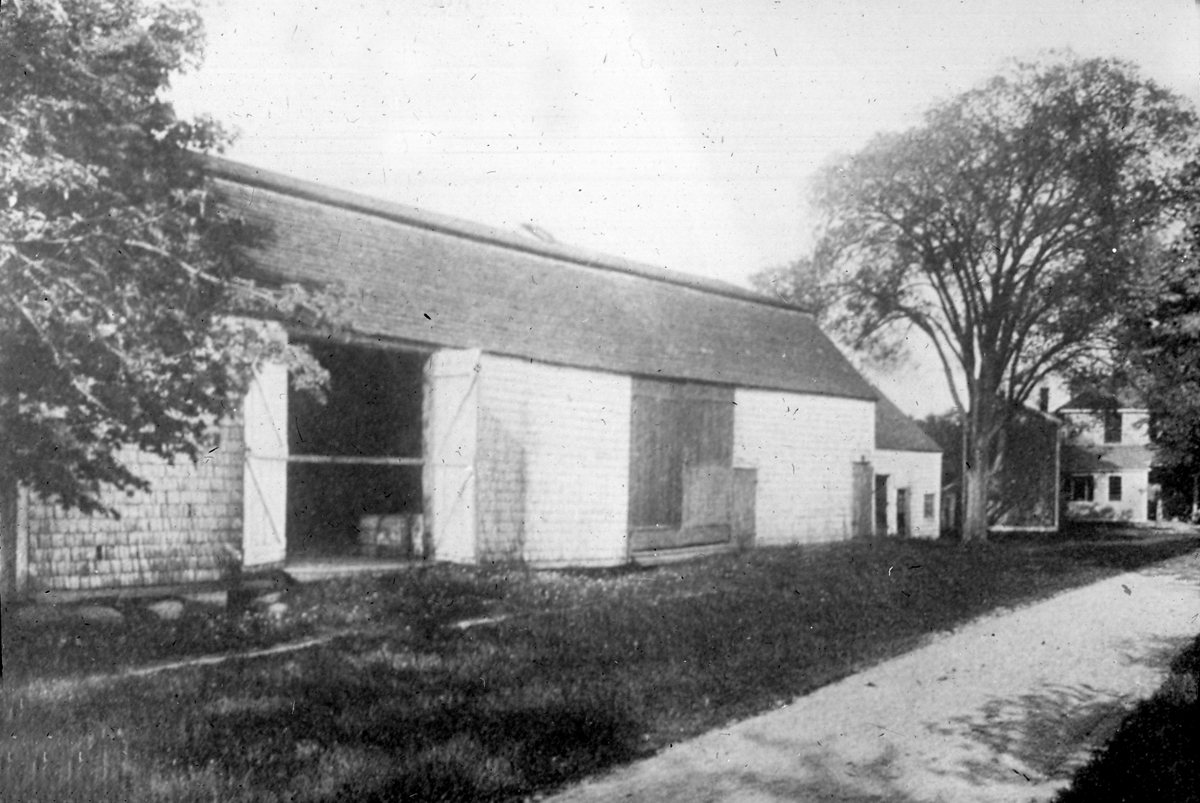
Original Goddard barn, located at 235 Goddard Ave. Brookline, Mass. USA. Photo pre-dates 1906 when it was torn down.

== See also ==
- National Register of Historic Places listings in Brookline, Massachusetts
