= South Boston =

Neighborhood in Boston, Massachusetts

- Neighborhood of Boston
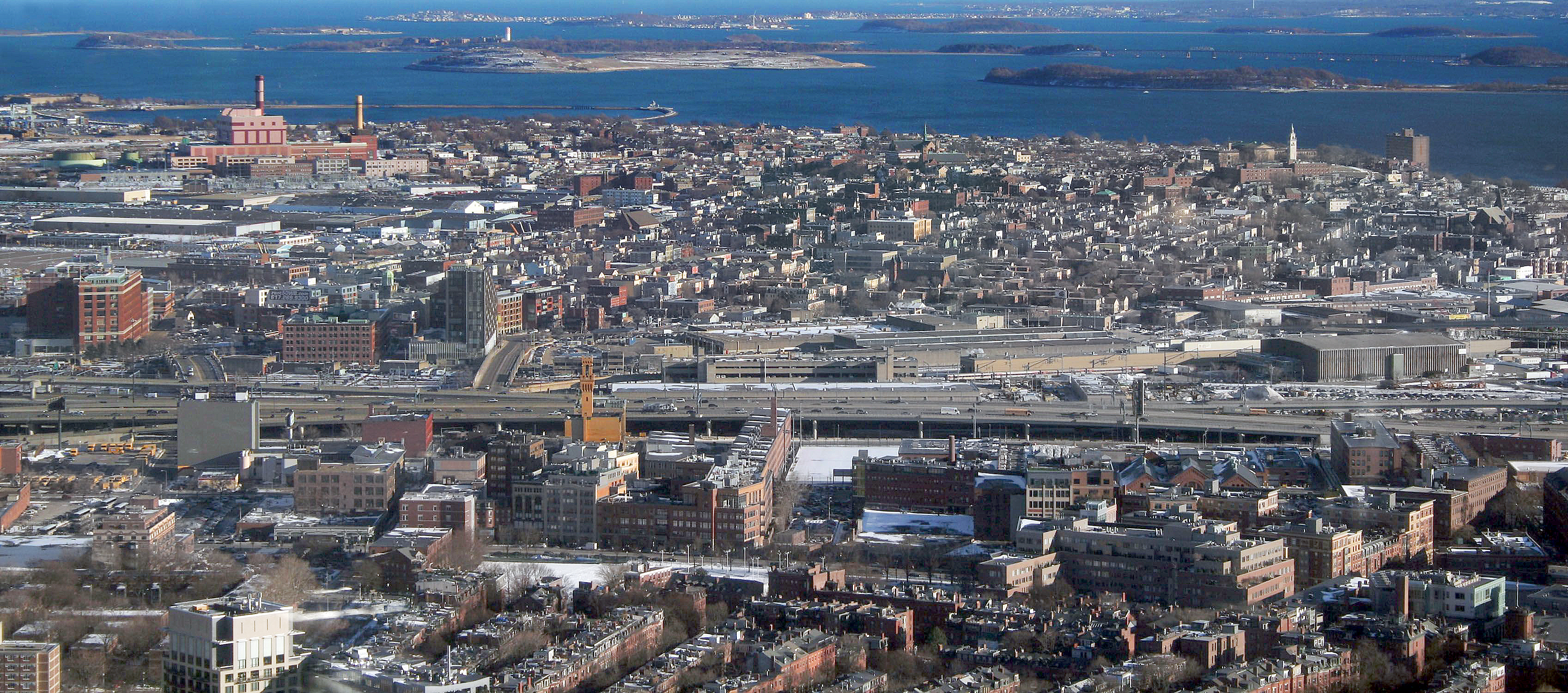
- South Boston from the air in 2010

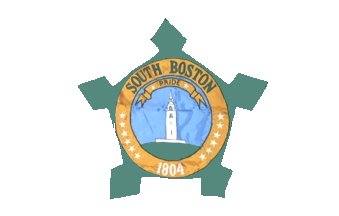
- Flag
- Nickname: Southie (colloquially)
- Coordinates: 42°20′10″N 71°02′45″W
- Country: United States
- State: Massachusetts
- County: Suffolk
- Neighborhood of: Boston
- Annexed by Boston: 1804

Area
  - Land: 3.1 sq mi (8.0 km^{2})

Population (2010)
  - Total: 33,688
  - Density: 10,867/sq mi (4,196/km^{2})
- Time zone: UTC-5 (Eastern)
- Zip Code: 02127
- Area codes: 617 / 857

South Boston (colloquially known as Southie) is a densely populated neighborhood of Boston, Massachusetts, United States, located south and east of the Fort Point Channel and abutting Dorchester Bay. It has undergone several demographic transformations since being annexed to the city of Boston in 1804. The neighborhood, once primarily farmland, is popularly known by its twentieth century identity as a working class Irish Catholic community. Throughout the twenty-first century, the neighborhood has become increasingly popular with millennial professionals.

South Boston contains Dorchester Heights, where George Washington forced British troops to evacuate during the American Revolutionary War. South Boston has undergone gentrification, and consequently, its real estate market has seen property values join the highest in the city. South Boston has also left its mark on history with Boston busing desegregation. South Boston is also home to the St. Patrick's Day Parade, a celebration of the Irish-American culture and the Evacuation Day observance.

== History ==
=== Landfill and European settlement to the 19th century ===
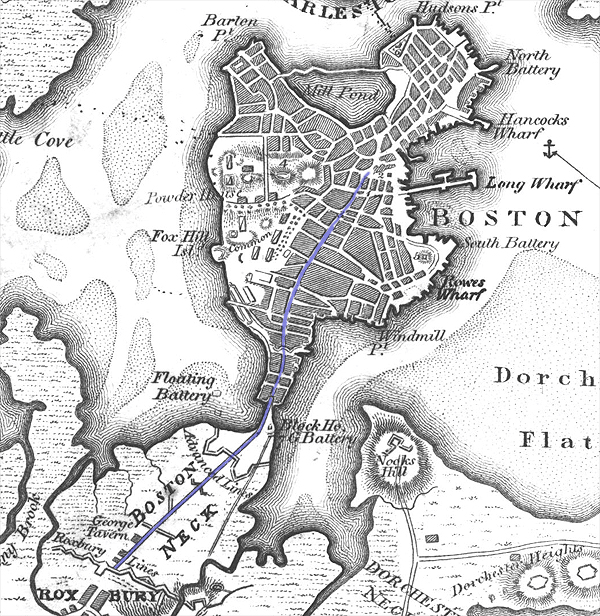
Dorchester neck can be seen on this early map of Boston in the lower right.

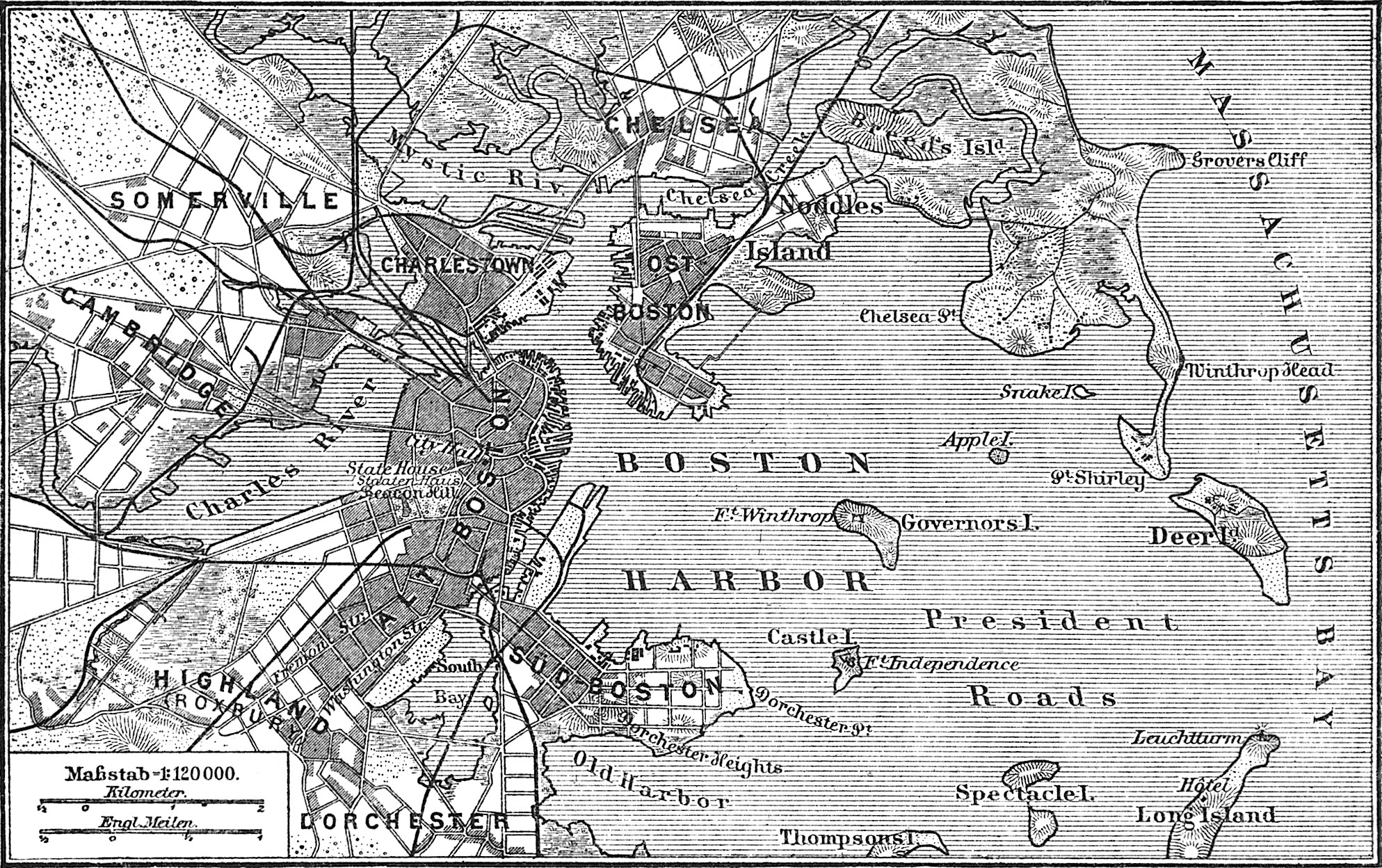
South Boston in 1890 ("Süd Boston" on this German map.)

Geographically, Dorchester Neck was an isthmus, a narrow strip of land that connected the mainland of the colonial settlement of Dorchester with Dorchester Heights. Landfill has since greatly increased the amount of land on the eastern side of the historical neck, and widened the connection to the mainland to the point that South Boston is no longer considered separate from it. South Boston gained an identity separate from Dorchester, but the two were annexed by Boston in pieces, from 1804 to 1870. Bridges were added over Fort Point Channel connecting South Boston with downtown.

During the American Revolutionary War, George Washington placed a cannon on Dorchester Heights, thereby forcing the evacuation of British troops from Boston on March 17, 1776. The British evacuated Boston and Fort William and Mary for Halifax, Nova Scotia. Fort William and Mary was replaced with a brick fortification known as Fort Independence. That fort was replaced by a granite fortification (bearing the same name) prior to the American Civil War, and still stands on Castle Island as a National Historic Landmark. Edgar Allan Poe was stationed at Castle Island for five months in 1827 and was inspired to write The Cask of Amontillado based on an early Castle Island legend.

=== 20th and 21st centuries ===
During the 1970s, South Boston received national attention for its opposition to court-mandated school (de facto) desegregation by busing students to different neighborhoods.

In the early 21st century, property values, especially in the City Point neighborhood near Castle Island, rose to the level of some of the highest in the city. The City Point area of South Boston, labeled "East Side" by realtors, has seen a major increase in property values due to its close proximity to downtown Boston and gentrification. The "West Side" of South Boston, also known as the "lower end" by lifelong residents, though slower to begin the gentrification process also benefits from the proximity to not only downtown but also the popular South End. Additionally, the West Side is home to the first green residence (Gold LEED certified) in Boston — the Macallen Building which was featured in the movie The Greening of Southie. The City of Boston is investing in the West Side through developments like the ~150,000-square-foot (14,000 m^{2}) mixed use (residential and commercial) building being developed by the Boston Redevelopment Authority on West Broadway.

=== Harrison Loring House ===
The 1865 Harrison Loring House is a Second Empire brick mansion located in South Boston. It was used as a private residence until 1913. At that time it was purchased by the Roman Catholic Church to use the space as a convent. The house located at 789 East Broadway was designated a Boston Landmark in 1981. It is associated with Harrison Loring, who owned and operated one of the first South Boston shipyards.

=== St. Patrick's Day Parade ===
The history behind the South Boston Saint Patrick's Day Parade is General Henry Knox brought 55 cannons captured at Fort Ticonderoga. In March, the troops positioned the cannons on Dorchester Heights. They had cut down trees to cannon size, hollowed them out and blackened them over fire to look like cannons. Surprise was just around the corner. On March 17, 1776, orders were given that if you wished to pass through the continental lines, the password was "St. Patrick". The British had seen all the cannons on the Heights and left Boston.

Evacuation Day was declared a holiday in the City of Boston in 1901. In celebration, the city hosted a parade based in South Boston. The Dorchester Heights Monument, a tribute to the historical event, was completed in Dorchester Heights in 1902. Major George F. H. Murray served as Chief Marshall for the parade in 1901. The state of Massachusetts recognized Evacuation Day as a holiday in Suffolk County (but not the rest of the state) in 1938. The Saint Patrick's Day Parade is both a celebration of the Irish-American culture in Boston and the Evacuation Day victory. The City of Boston sponsored the event until 1947, when Mayor James Michael Curley gave authority to the South Boston Allied War Veterans Council.

Politicians and local celebrities have participated in these annual Saint Patrick's Day Parade for years. In 1958, Senator John F. Kennedy rode with Jacqueline Kennedy in the parade. The Kennedy family were well known as participating in this parade. Robert F. Kennedy marched in 1968, Ted and Joan Kennedy also marched in 1970. The N.A.A.C.P entered a float in the Saint Patrick's Day Parade in 1964. In the mid-1960s Harvard's Irish Society joined the march. Irish nationalists unofficially marched in the Saint Patrick's Day Parade in the 1960s and 1970s. In 1972, Irish Republican Aid Committee members protested violence in Northern Ireland during the Troubles by carrying a coffin draped with the Irish tricolored flag. The Boston chapter of the Irish Northern Aid Commission marched with black armbands and a sign reading "England Get out of Ireland".

The year 1976 marked the 200th anniversary of Evacuation Day and the 75th anniversary of the parade. A reenactment of the 1776 evacuation was incorporated into the parade, with fireworks and period costumes. President George H. W. Bush declared March Irish-American Heritage Month in 1991. The application of the Irish American Gay, Lesbian and Bisexual Group of Boston, or GLIB, to march in the Saint Patrick's Day Parade in 1992, the first of its kind in the history of the parade, was met with a rejection by the South Boston Allied War Veterans Council. In recent years, parade organizers have tried to make the event more kid-friendly, by incorporating "family zones" or sober places to watch the parade. The South Boston, St. Patrick's Parade is listed as the second-largest parade in the country, being viewed by nearly 600,000 to 1 million people every year, in addition to having the entire parade seen on live television.

In the 1990s, South Boston became the focus for a U.S. Supreme Court case on the right of gay and lesbian groups to participate in the Saint Patrick's Day (Evacuation Day) parade. The case was decided in favor of the parade's sponsors when the Supreme Court supported the South Boston Allied War Veterans' right to determine who can participate in their annual St. Patrick's Day parade. In 1996 local Dorchester author Paul Walkowski and Attorney William Connolly detailed the case in their book "From Trial Court to the United States Supreme Court".

Today, the St. Patrick's Day Parade marches from West Broadway to East Broadway, finishing at Farragut Road. Every year, from 10,000 to 20,000 participants join the parade.

== Demographics ==
South Boston became known as an Irish working-class neighborhood when large numbers of Irish immigrants settled there in the mid-nineteenth century and continued to do so throughout the twentieth. Once a predominantly Irish Catholic community, in recent years South Boston has become increasingly desirable among young professionals and families who are attracted to the neighborhood's strong sense of community and quick access to downtown and public transportation. South Boston has a population of about 33,311. The median age is about 32.

The 2020 U.S. census found South Boston's total population to be 33,688. There were 26,700 White residents (79.2%), while 2,789 residents were of Hispanic ancestry (8.3%), 1,926 of African-American heritage (5.7%) and 1,603 of Asian ancestry (4.8%). There were 466 residents of non-Hispanic mixed race (1.4%) and 190 people (0.6%) identified with other groups (i.e. American Indians and those not otherwise categorized).

== Seaport District ==
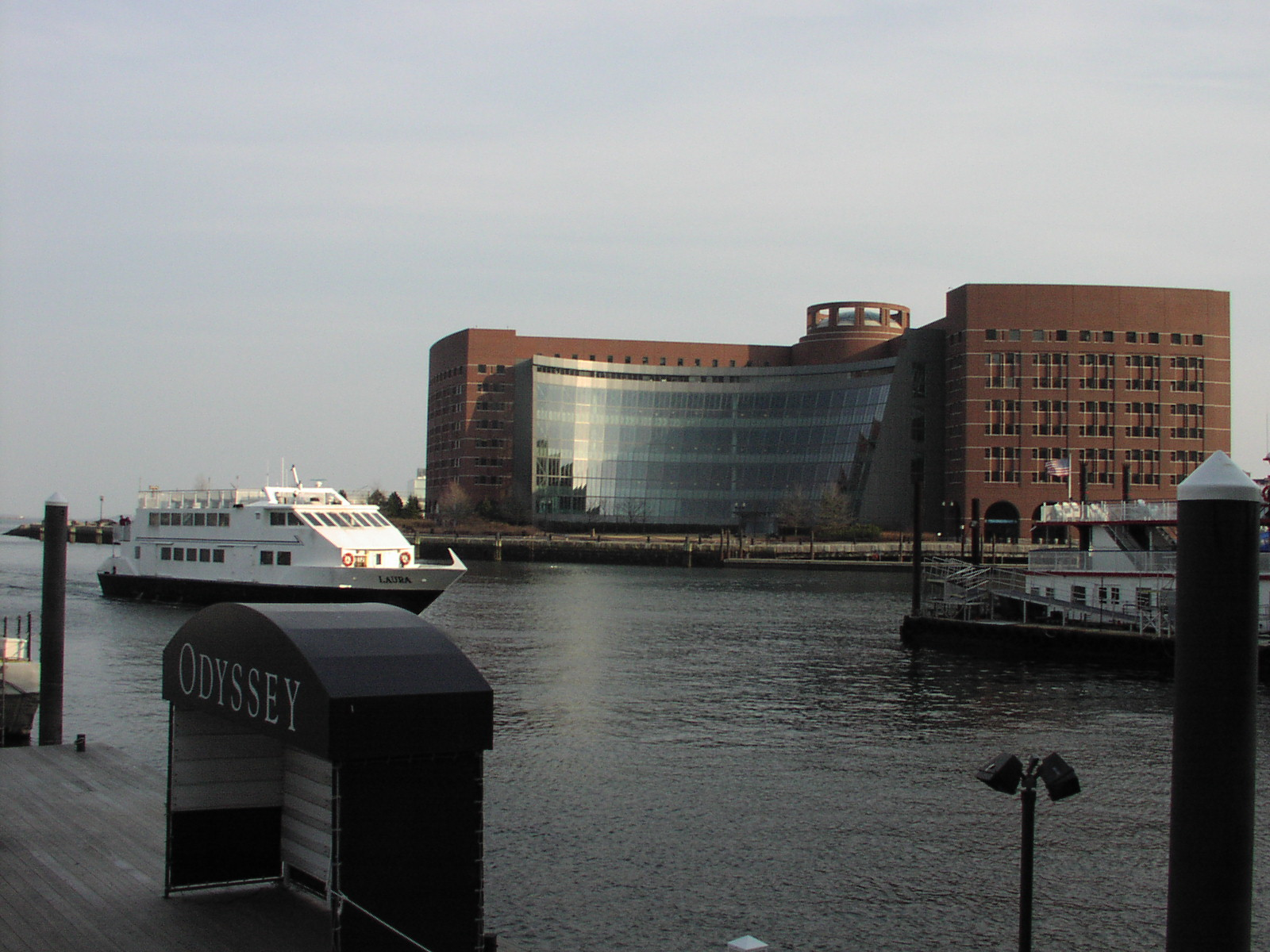
John Joseph Moakley United States Courthouse on Fan Pier

Development in the Seaport has boomed during the early 21st century. It was considered "the hottest, fastest-growing real estate market in the country" in 2014. As of 2017, it was the fastest growing part of Boston and has stimulated significant economic growth in the city. The restoration of the Seaport began with the completion of the Big Dig. This $14.6 billion project buried the formerly elevated Central Artery I-93 Interstate which previously cut off the waterfront from the rest of the city.

In May 2010, Mayor Menino announced plans for the city to develop 1,000 acres on the South Boston Waterfront as an Innovation District. Inspired by the success of the 22@ model, the mayor's vision was to redevelop the then-mostly abandoned Seaport District into a hub for Information Age jobs and a new frontier for cutting-edge industries such as clean tech, health care information technology and mobile media. Between Menino's announcement in 2010 and 2017, 5,000 new jobs were created and over 200 new companies have formed. Forty percent of the companies located in the Innovation District share space in co-working spaces and incubators. Over 1,100 housing units were constructed, including 300 innovation micro-units.

== Economy ==
The headquarters of Reebok is in South Boston.

== Schools ==
Public schools are operated by Boston Public Schools.

=== Public ===
- Excel High School
- James Condon Elementary
- Joseph P. Tynan Elementary
- Oliver Hazard Perry School
- UP Academy Boston
- South Boston High School (Former)
- Michael J. Perkins School

=== Private ===
- South Boston Catholic Academy - the parish school of Gate of Heaven/Saint Brigid of Kildare parish
- Saint Peter Academy (West 4th Street)
- Historical private schools relocated or closed
  - Gate of Heaven School
  - Perkins Institution and Massachusetts Asylum for the Blind
  - Saint Augustine School
  - Saint Peter School (I & 6th Streets)

== Places of worship ==
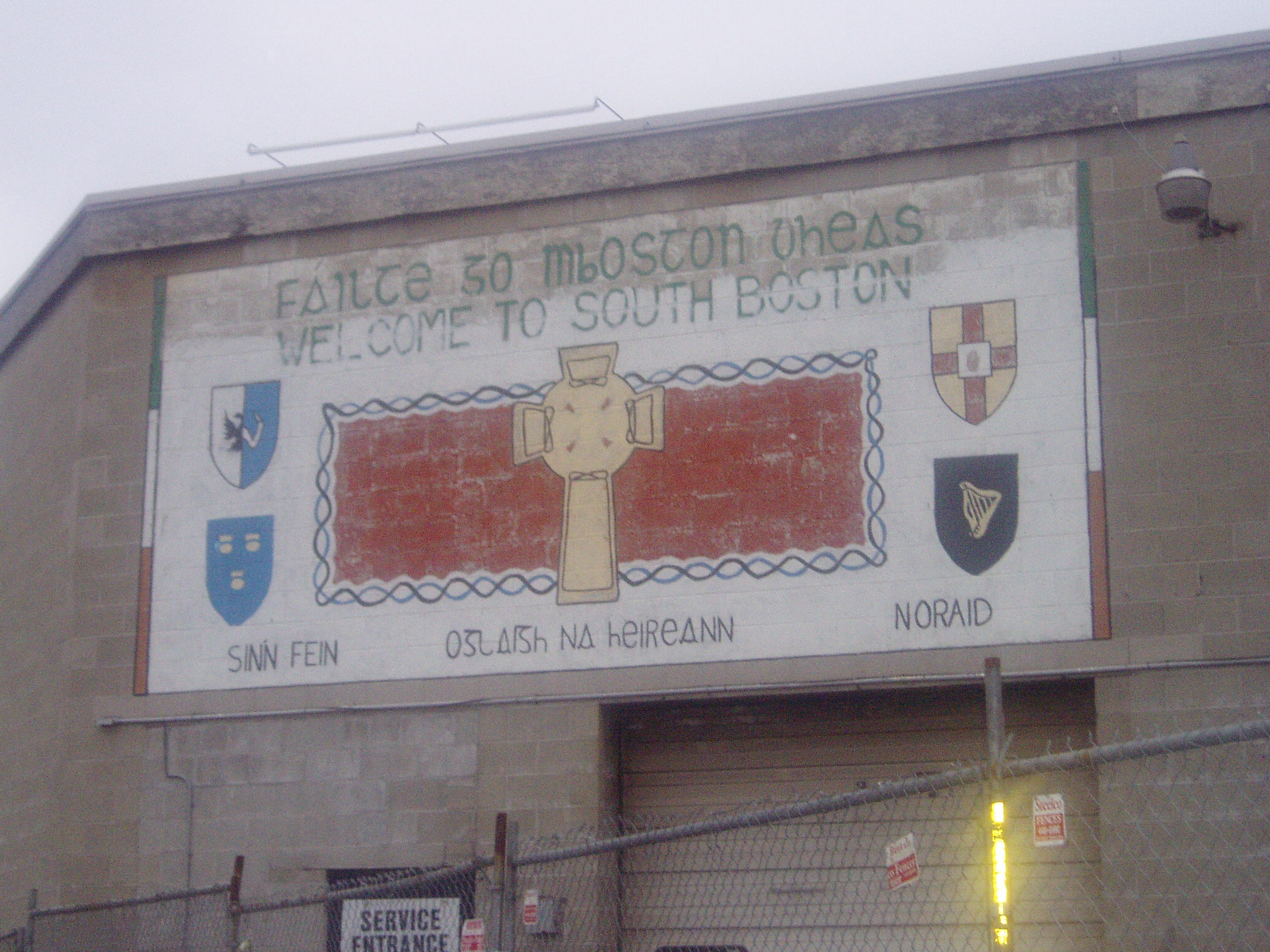
Mural in South Boston saying "Welcome to South Boston" in English and "Fáilte go mBoston dheas" in Irish. Also shown is a Celtic cross, the coats of arms of the Provinces of Ireland and the words "Sinn Féin" "Irish Republican Army" and "NORAID." This Mural has been torn down along with the building to make way for resident housing.

Catholic Churches

- Gate of Heaven Parish – Established in 1863. The parish's large Neo-gothic church, located on the corner of E. 4th Street and I Street is a prominent feature of the South Boston skyline.
- Saint Brigid Parish – Originally called St. Eulalia's, St. Brigid was originally a mission chapel of nearby Gate of Heaven parish. It was made a separate parish in 1908. The two parishes are now administered as a cooperative.
- Saint Augustine Chapel and Cemetery – The oldest Catholic Church in Massachusetts, completed in 1819. It is currently administered as part of the Gate of Heaven & Saint Brigid Parish collective. It was added to the National Register of Historic places in 1987
- Our Lady of Czestochowa (Polish)
- Saint Monica – Saint Augustine (currently merged)
- Saint Peter (Lithuanian)
- Saint Vincent de Paul
- Our Lady of Good Voyage

Albanian Orthodox Churches

- St George Cathedral: Located near the intersection of East and West Broadway, St George is the largest Orthodox Christian house of worship in Massachusetts. As the mother church of the Albanian diocese, the Cathedral serves as episcopal seat of Archbishop Nikon, Archbishop of Boston, New England and the Albanian Archdiocese.
- Albanian Holy Trinity Church, Kisha Shqiptare e Shen Trinise: Located at 245 D Street Boston, Massachusetts 02127.
- St John the Baptist

Episcopal

- St Matthew and the Redeemer (former)

Baptist

- South Baptist Church, at 80 L Street
- Hub Church

Presbyterian

- Fourth Presbyterian Church

Fourth Church has been a part of South Boston since 1870. Situated between two housing projects.

== Parks ==
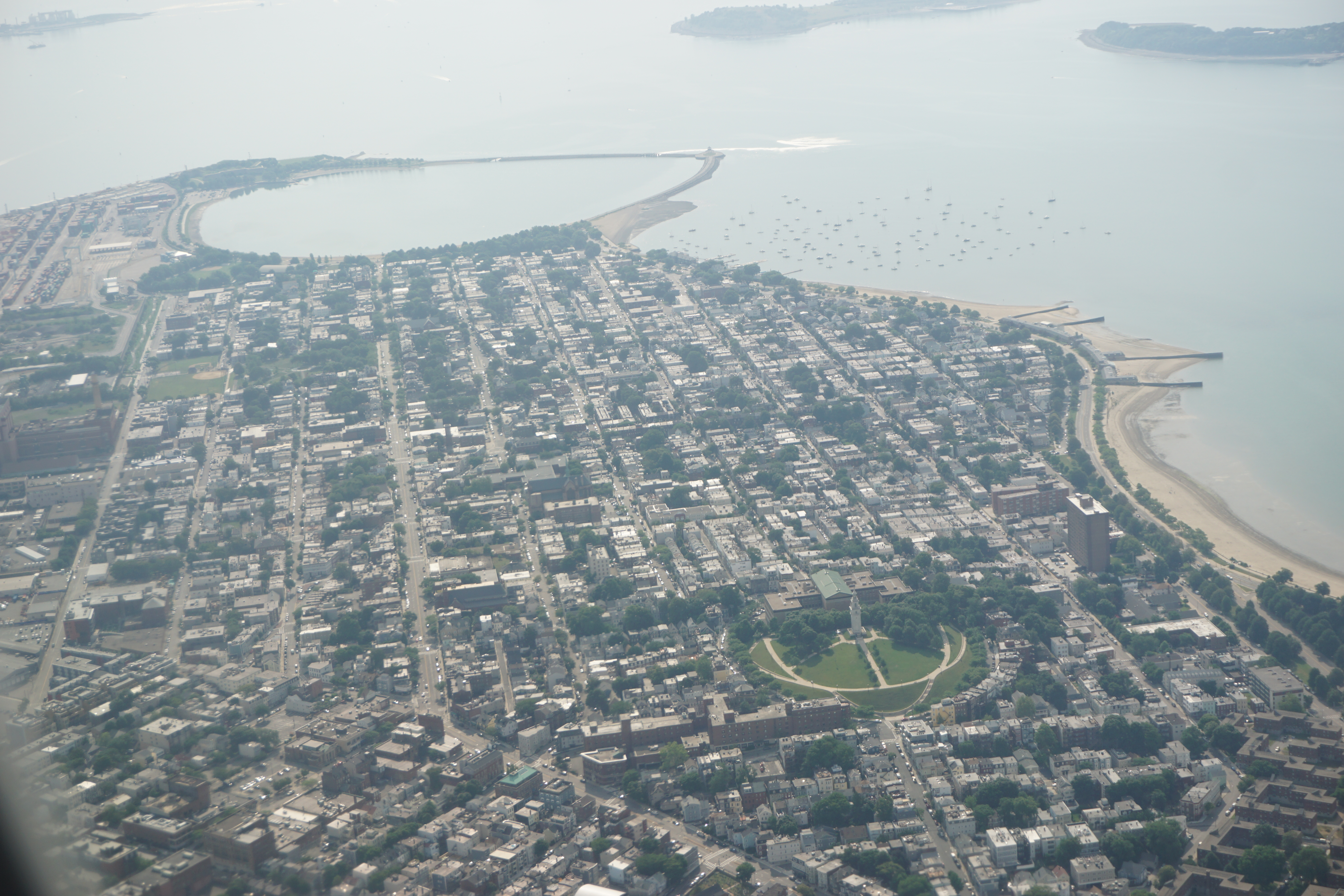
The peninsula of South Boston, featuring Castle Island and Dorchester Heights, as view from the air

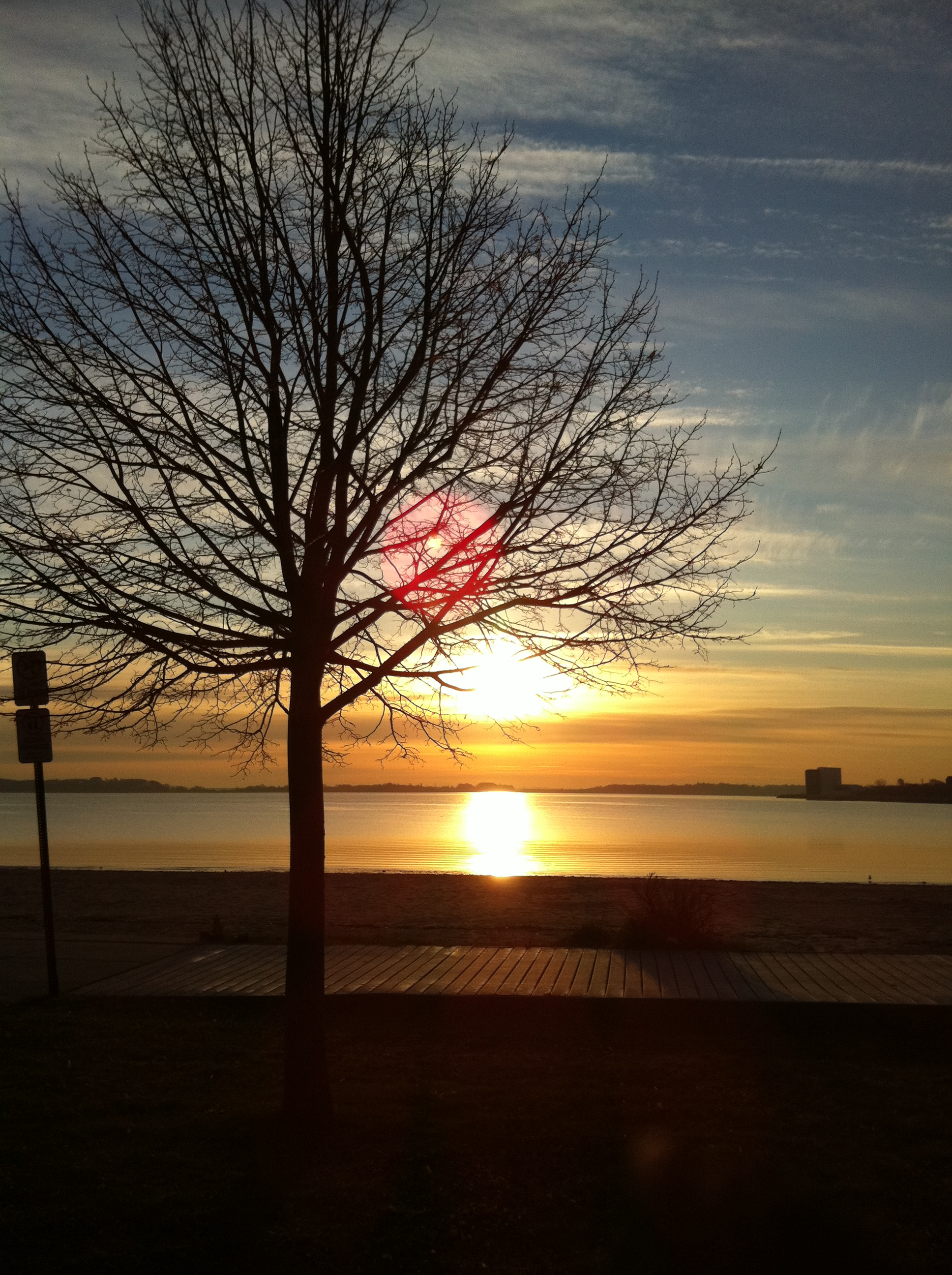
Carson Beach at sunrise

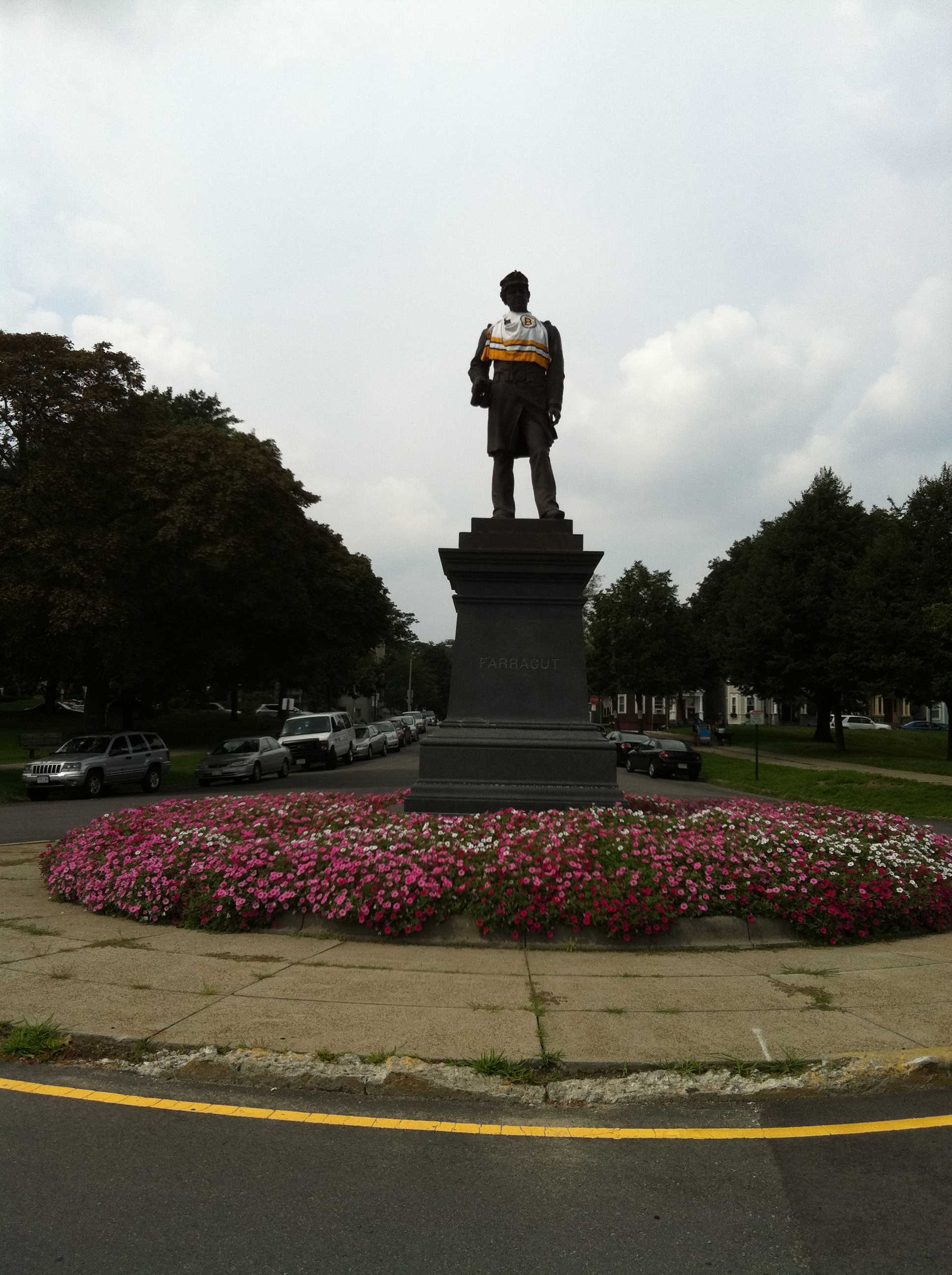
Marine Park at City Point

Fort Independence, a pentagonal five-bastioned, granite fort built between 1834 and 1851, is the dominating feature of Castle Island. This 22-acre urban park (8.9 ha) is connected to the mainland by both pedestrian and vehicular causeways. Pleasure Bay, the M Street Beach and Carson Beach form a three-mile segment of parkland and beach along the South Boston shoreline of Dorchester Bay. Carson Beach offers public amenities: public restrooms, exhibit space, first aid and lifeguard functions. Carson Beach also features a walkway along the water's edge from Castle Island to the Kennedy Library.

Fort Independence and Castle Island are on the State and National Registers of Historic Places, and the fort is a National Historic Landmark. Fort tours are conducted by the Castle Island Association in the summer months and there is interpretive signage for self-guided tours.

Thomas Park is also known as Dorchester Heights. Atop the hill sits a tall monument commemorating the Patriot battle that drove the British out of Boston.

Between M and N streets and north of Broadway, the M Street Park was one of the most desirable addresses in Boston in the late 19th century, and the brownstone buildings overlooking the park on the south side of the park remain some of the best examples of this style of architecture in New England. M Street Park is also home to the first standing Vietnam memorial in the nation. Included in this memorial are all the names of the South Boston residents who gave their lives fighting for the United States.

Located at D Street and Northern Avenue, Boston, Massachusetts, South Boston Maritime Park is a rectangle of green lawn, gardens, trees, benches, and paved walkways. Artwork along the paths displays fish and sea motifs, paying tribute to the city's maritime background. The roofed seating area provides partial shade and tables and chairs, an ideal spot for lunch.

Joe Moakley Park is an urban park that features baseball and soccer fields, a traffic garden, a spray area and a jogging track.

A lawn on 420 D Street on the east side of the Boston Convention and Exhibition Center.

Raymond L. Flynn Marine Park has bay views, open lawn, athletic fields and a playground.

Marine Industrial Park is a 191-acre waterfront area (77 ha) with businesses plus a brewery, a museum and a cruise terminal.

== Public housing ==
South Boston is home to some of the oldest public housing in the United States. In the last 30 years, they have changed from having a mostly Irish-American population to a more ethnically mixed population. The housing facilities are under the control of the Boston Housing Authority (BHA) and include West Broadway which was built in 1949 and occupies 20 acres (81,000 m^{2}), West Ninth Street (these three facilities are next to each other and commonly called D street), Old Colony which was built in 1941, and Mary Ellen McCormack, which is the BHA's oldest development, being constructed in 1936. It was originally called Old Harbor Village.

Other developments are Harbor Point (in Dorchester), Foley and Monsignor Powers.

As of the June 26, 2014, city officials and civilians officially celebrated the completion of the second phase of construction and redevelopment of the Old Colony housing project that took place in the neighborhood of South Boston that began construction back in 2009. The phase two completion included high-efficiency affordable housing in town-house style and four-story elevator buildings. Part of this project was funded by a HOPE VI grant which ensured $22-million for the project to build these new public houses for the citizens of South Boston, replacing 223 original apartments along Old Colony Avenue up to Dorchester Street and over to Reverend Burke Street which were demolished. These new, affordable housing units are some of the most environmentally-friendly public houses in the entire Commonwealth. In the future, the Boston Housing Authority and its partners are looking to redevelop the remaining 453 original housing units in South Boston.

== Transportation ==
South Boston is served by Andrew station and Broadway station on the Red Line of the MBTA subway system. Both stations are located on the west side of the neighborhood. MBTA bus routes 7, 9, 10, and 11 run through South Boston, all terminating at City Point Bus Terminal.

The MBTA Silver Line, a Bus rapid transit service, connects the South Boston Waterfront with South Station via a bus tunnel beneath Congress St. and Boston Logan International Airport in neighboring East Boston via the Massachusetts Turnpike and the Ted Williams Tunnel.

== Culture and events ==
Institute of Contemporary Art, Boston was opened in 2006 in the South Boston Seaport District. It functions as a modern art museum and exhibition center featuring permanent and temporary exhibition, educational programs, performances, and film screenings.

Every year, hundreds of people join the L Street Brownies for the New Year's Day Plunge in Dorchester Bay (Boston Harbor). The event is accompanied by spectators and reporters. This winter gathering has been taking place annually since 1904.

Participants of the Boston's only triathlon swim in the waters of Dorchester Bay, bike through the city streets of Boston, and run along the Southie shoreline.

== Notable people ==
South Boston has been the birthplace and home to a number of notable people, including:

- James "Whitey" Bulger, local organized crime figure, Irish mob boss, and FBI informant.
- William M. Bulger, former president of the Massachusetts Senate, former president of the University of Massachusetts and younger brother of James "Whitey" Bulger.
- James Connolly, athlete and author who, in 1896, became the first modern Olympic champion.
- John Connolly, a former FBI agent and convict who formed a working relationship with organized crime figure Whitey Bulger.
- John Cunniff, National Hockey League hockey coach and former professional player who appeared in 65 World Hockey Association regular season games between 1972 and 1976.
- Richard Cushing, prelate of the Roman Catholic Church who served as Archbishop of Boston from 1944 to 1970, and was elevated to the cardinalate in 1958.
- John Ferruggio, led the evacuation of Pan Am Flight 93, in 1970.
- Michael F. Flaherty, an at-large member of Boston City Council. He is a member of the Democratic Party and was elected city council president every year from 2002 to 2006.
- Raymond Flynn, Boston's mayor from 1984 to 1993 and the U.S. ambassador to the Holy See, from 1993 to 1997.
- Brian Goodman, film and television director, writer and actor.
- James Healy, America's first Catholic bishop of African descent.
- William Henry Houghton, fourth president of Moody Bible Institute, in Chicago.
- James M. "Jim" Kelly, former Boston city councilor, council president and community activist.
- George Kenneally, former pro-football player with a number of teams – most notably the Philadelphia Eagles.
- David Lindsay-Abaire, Pulitzer Prize-winning playwright and lyricist.
- Edward Lawrence Logan, National Guard general, politician, judge at South Boston District Court and namesake of Logan International Airport
- Stephen Lynch, Congressman, a Democrat serving in the United States House of Representatives. Former ironworker and President of Ironworkers Local 7, State Representative and State Senator, he won his primary election to Congress on September 11, 2001.
- John William McCormack, politician who served as a member of U.S. House of Representatives from 1928 until he retired from political life in 1971. A member of the Democratic Party, he served as the House Majority Leader three times and as the Speaker of the House of Representatives from 1962 until 1971.
- Will McDonough, sportswriter for The Boston Globe and television analyst.
- Joe Moakley, U.S. congressman serving as a Democrat and the last chairman of the United States House Committee on Rules.
- Leo Monahan (1926–2013), sports journalist who covered the Boston Bruins
- Pat Nee, former Irish mob associate of Whitey Bulger, arms trafficker to the Provisional Irish Republican Army, and memoirist.
- Brian Noonan, hockey player who won the Stanley Cup in 1994 with New York Rangers.
- John G. Ryan, President of P.F. Collier and Son Corporation, publisher of Collier's Encyclopedia, President of The Richards Company, reference book subsidiary of Grolier Incorporated.
- John "Red" Shea, former drug trafficker, Irish mob associate of Whitey Bulger, and memoirist.
- Fr. Edmund A. Walsh (1885 - 1956), Jesuit priest and career diplomat, founder of the Georgetown University College of Foreign Services, head of both the American and Vatican Relief Missions during the Russian Famine of 1921, vocal anti-Communist, and special assistant to Prosecutor Robert H. Jackson during the Nuremberg Trials.
- Kevin Weeks, former Irish mob boss, close associate of and witness against Whitey Bulger, and memoirist.
- New Kids On The Block, boy band.
- Mark Wahlberg, actor.
- Jeremy Willis, fictional video game character better known as The Scout from Team Fortress 2.
