= Evacuation Day (Massachusetts) =

Holiday observed on March 17

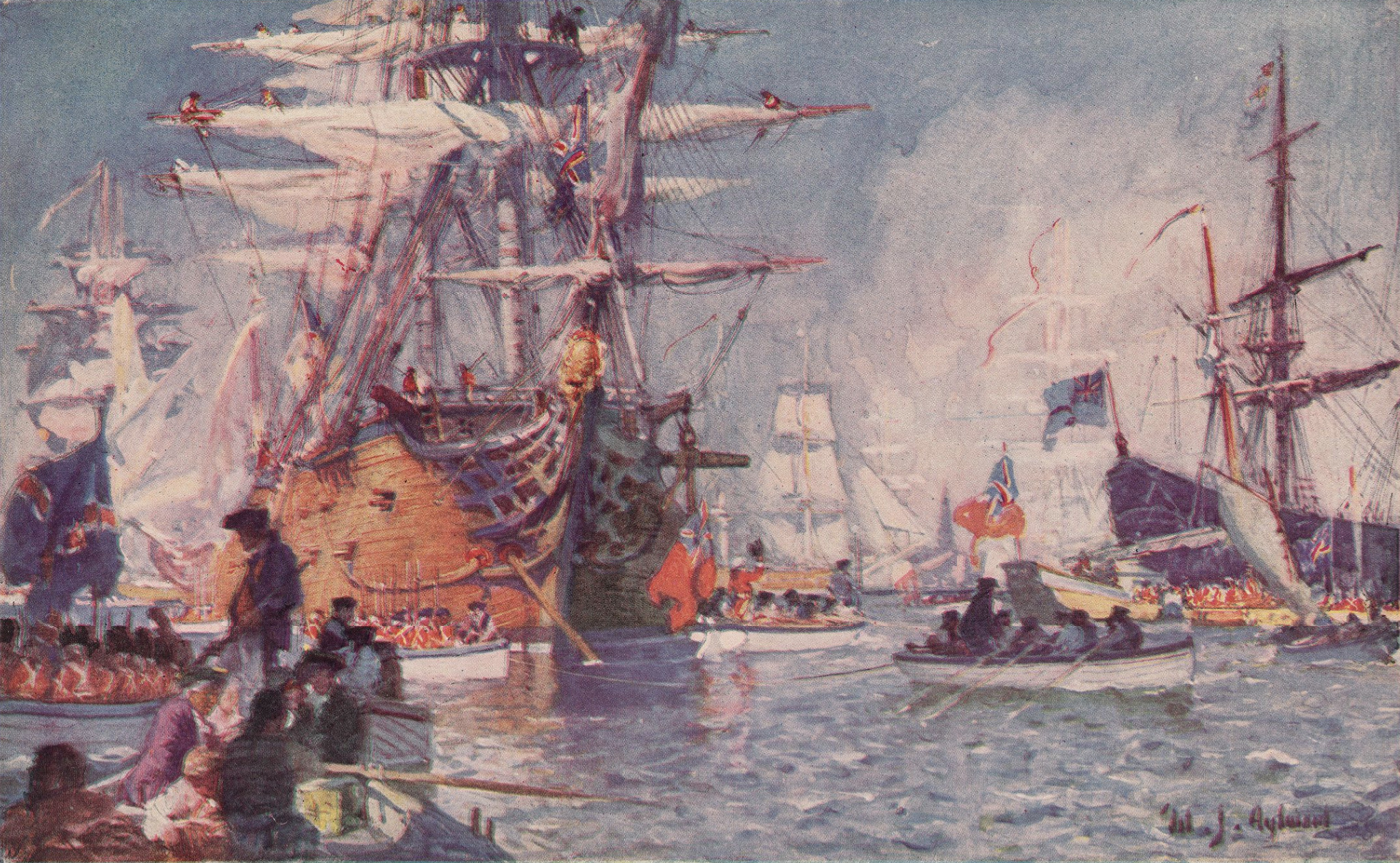
- 1911 painting of the British evacuation of Boston
- Observed by: Suffolk County, Massachusetts, and some state offices located there Somerville, Massachusetts, public schools
- Celebrations: Commemoration ceremony at Dorchester Heights; Saint Patrick's Day festivities
- Date: March 17
- Next time: 17 March 2027
- Frequency: annual
- Related to: Saint Patrick's Day

Evacuation Day is a holiday observed on March 17 in Suffolk County, Massachusetts (which consists of the cities of Boston, Chelsea, Revere, and Winthrop), and also by the public schools in Somerville, Massachusetts. The holiday commemorates the evacuation of British forces from the city of Boston following the siege of Boston, early in the American Revolutionary War. Some schools and government offices may be closed. If March 17 falls on a weekend, schools and government offices may be closed on the following Monday in observance. It is the same day as Saint Patrick's Day, a coincidence that played a role in the establishment of the holiday.

== Historical background ==
The 11-month siege of Boston ended when the Continental Army under the command of George Washington fortified Dorchester Heights in early March 1776 with cannons captured at Ticonderoga. British General William Howe's garrison and navy were threatened by these positions, and they were forced to decide between attack and retreat. Howe decided to retreat in order to prevent what could have been a repeat of the Battle of Bunker Hill, withdrawing from Boston to Nova Scotia on March 17, 1776.

The British evacuation was Washington's first victory of the war. It was also a huge morale boost for the Thirteen Colonies.

== Establishment of the holiday ==
Saint Patrick's Day parades have been held in Boston since 1876, but Evacuation Day was not declared a holiday in the city until 1901 amid interest in local history that also resulted in the construction of the Dorchester Heights Monument. The state made it a holiday in Suffolk County in 1938. The large Irish population of Boston at that time played a role in the establishment of the holiday. A 1941 law established the holiday in Suffolk County, signed in both black and green ink.

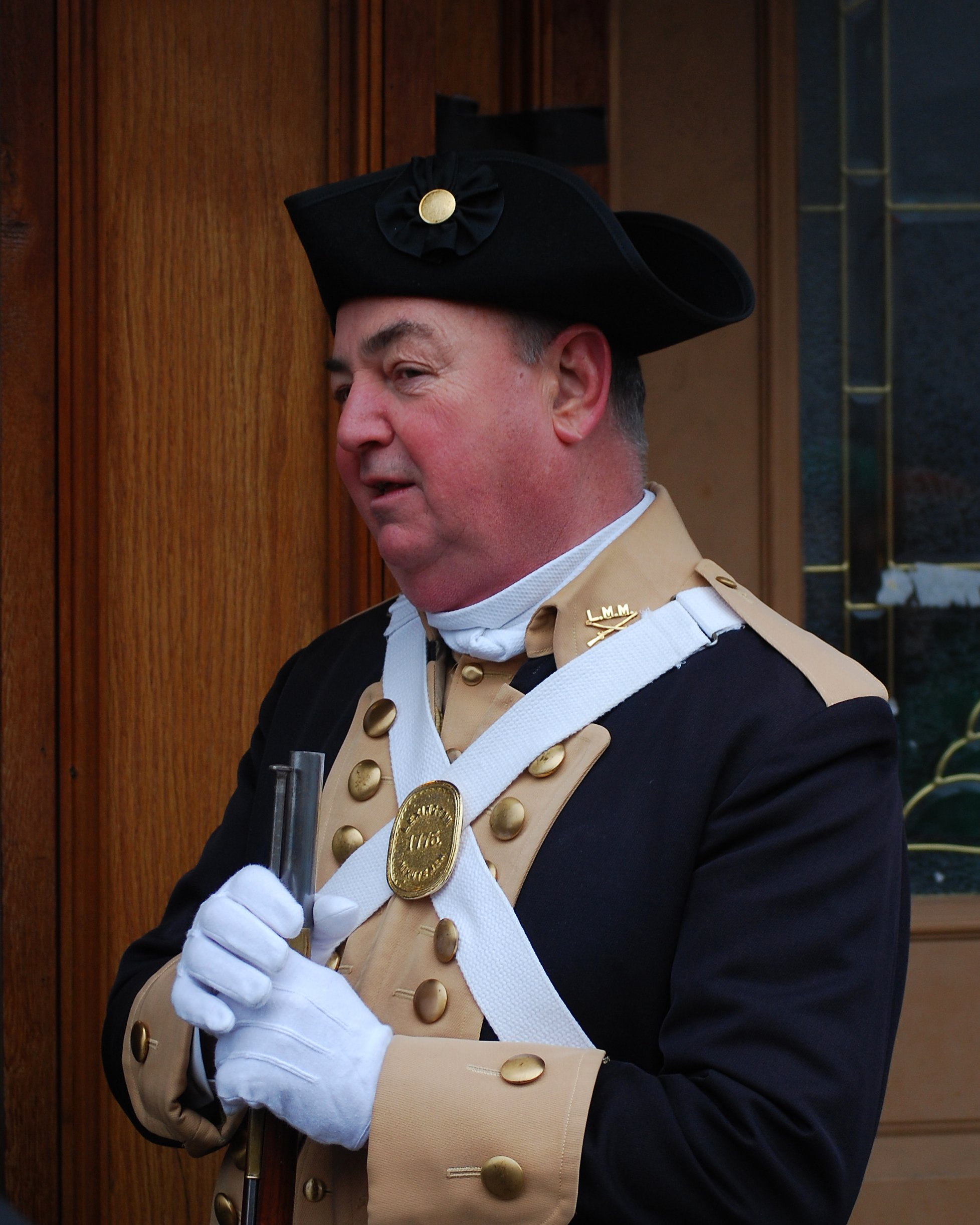
A Revolutionary War reenactor at Boston's 2008 St. Patrick's Day parade

== Observance activities ==
Evacuation Day activities are limited in the areas that observe the holiday. The Allied War Veterans of South Boston mark the day with a ceremony on Dorchester Heights. The city of Boston offers free parking for the day.

== Moves to eliminate holiday ==
In 2010, the state legislature debated eliminating Evacuation Day and Bunker Hill Day as official holidays, citing the expense of giving state and local workers paid days off. The state's 2011 budget required all state and municipal offices in Suffolk County to be open on both days.

== See also ==
- Evacuation Day (New York)
- Massacre Day
- Patriots' Day
