= Dorchester Heights Monument =

Monument in Boston, Massachusetts, U.S.

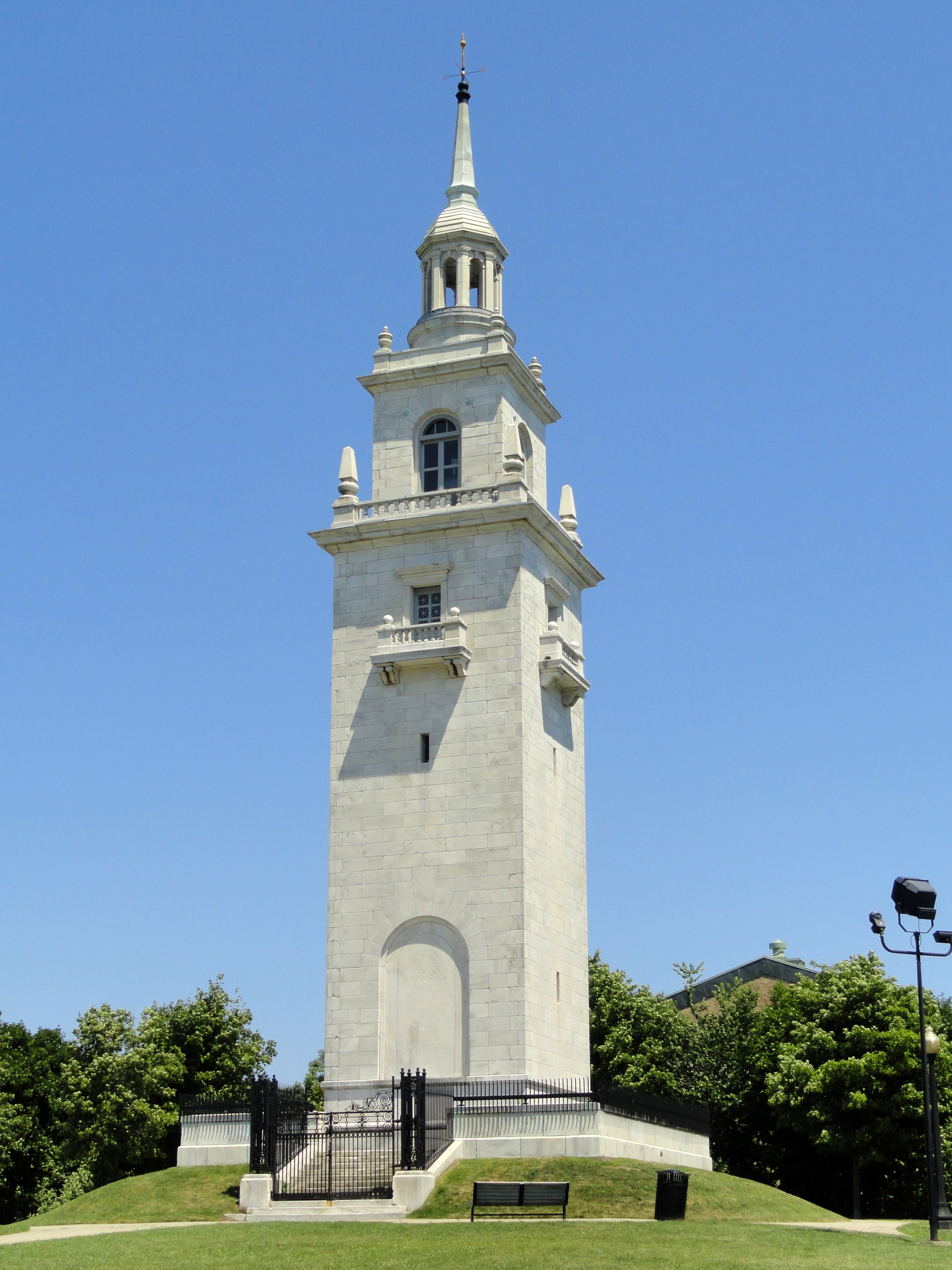
- The monument in 2011
- Interactive map of Dorchester Heights Monument
- Location: Dorchester Heights, Boston, Massachusetts, United States
- Coordinates: 42°19′58″N 71°02′45″W
- Designer: Peabody & Stearns
- Material: Marble
- Length: 18.3 ft (5.6 m)
- Width: 18.3 ft (5.6 m)
- Height: 115 ft (35 m)
- Beginning date: 1899
- Completion date: 1902
- Dedicated date: March 17, 1902
- Dedicated to: American victory in the siege of Boston

The Dorchester Heights Monument is a large public monument in the Dorchester Heights area of Boston, Massachusetts, United States. The monument, consisting of a 115-foot (35 m) marble tower, honors the evacuation of Boston during the American Revolutionary War, an early American victory in the conflict. The monument is located near where George Washington ordered the construction of a redoubt, an area which has since been developed as a public park. It was designed by the architectural firm of Peabody & Stearns and was dedicated on March 17, 1902 (Evacuation Day).

== History ==
=== Background ===
On the outbreak of the American Revolutionary War, American troops commenced a lengthy siege of Boston, which was controlled by British forces. This siege ended in 1776 when, on March 17, American General George Washington constructed a redoubt atop Dorchester Heights in what is now South Boston. Following this, British troops under General William Howe retreated from the city. The evacuation of Boston was the first major American victory and Washington's first victory in the war. Today, March 17 is recognized in Boston as Evacuation Day, a local holiday. In 1853, the area where the redoubts stood was converted to a municipal park. The park, centered on Telegraph Hill, was called Thomas Park and was one of the first public parks in the city.

In June 1898, the Massachusetts General Court passed a resolution appropriating $25,000 for the creation of a monument at Dorchester Heights to commemorate the construction of the redoubts that led to the British evacuation. Following this, the Governor of Massachusetts assembled a committee with his Executive Council and in May 1899 opened a limited competition for designs for the monument. Eight architectural firms submitted proposals, and in October 1899 the submission by Peabody & Stearns was selected. However, all of the bids exceeded the initial budget. There were also disputes over the original plans, which called for a monument made of brick, so the plans had to be redrawn to meet demands that the monument be made of granite.

Work on the monument had commenced by February 1900, and a cornerstone-laying ceremony for the monument took place on May 25, 1900, with Governor Winthrop M. Crane in attendance. By August 1900, the monument had been constructed to within 25 feet (7.6 m) of its final height. In both 1901 and 1902, the General Court voted to increase funding for the construction, the first time for $8,000 and the second time for $3,000. Additionally, a total of $10,000 was appropriated for dedication purposes. In total, construction on the monument lasted from 1899 to 1902.

=== Dedication ===
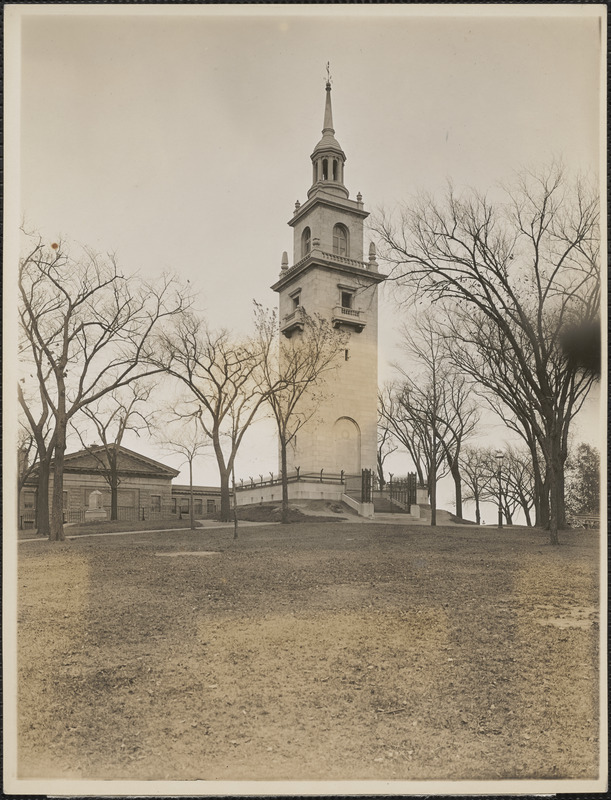
The monument in 1920

The dedication ceremony for the monument occurred on March 17, 1902, on the 126th anniversary of the evacuation of Boston. The celebrations began around noon with a procession of members of the United States Marine Corps, with Governor Winthrop M. Crane and other guests of honor riding in a carriage. After the Governor and guests had assembled at the monument, the Marine band played "The Star-Spangled Banner". Afterwards, Governor Crane gave an address to the crowd and a tablet in the front of the monument, which previously had been covered with American flags, was unveiled, after which the band played "America".

Following this, the ceremony moved to the nearby South Boston High School, where an orchestra performed the overture from Mignon. Afterwards, a prayer was given by William Fairfield Warren (then-President of Boston University) and a quartet sang "Almighty Father". The orchestra then performed "Narcissus" before noted singer Alice May Bates Rice gave a solo rendition of "The Star-Spangled Banner". This was followed by an oration by Massachusetts politician and statesman Henry Cabot Lodge. The quartet then sang "The Victor's Return", which was followed by another playing of "America" before the ceremony ended with the orchestra playing "American Airs".

=== Later years ===
The interior of the monument, initially closed to the public because of a lack of safety railings, was transferred to the city government and opened in 1904. The Dorchester Heights Monument was restored in 1935 as part of a project to address structural defects. The exterior and interior were restored and repainted, and new steel and concrete work was installed inside. The monument was also weatherproofed and caulked. On June 21, 1997, the monument was rededicated following a $4.8 million renovation of the park.

== Design ==
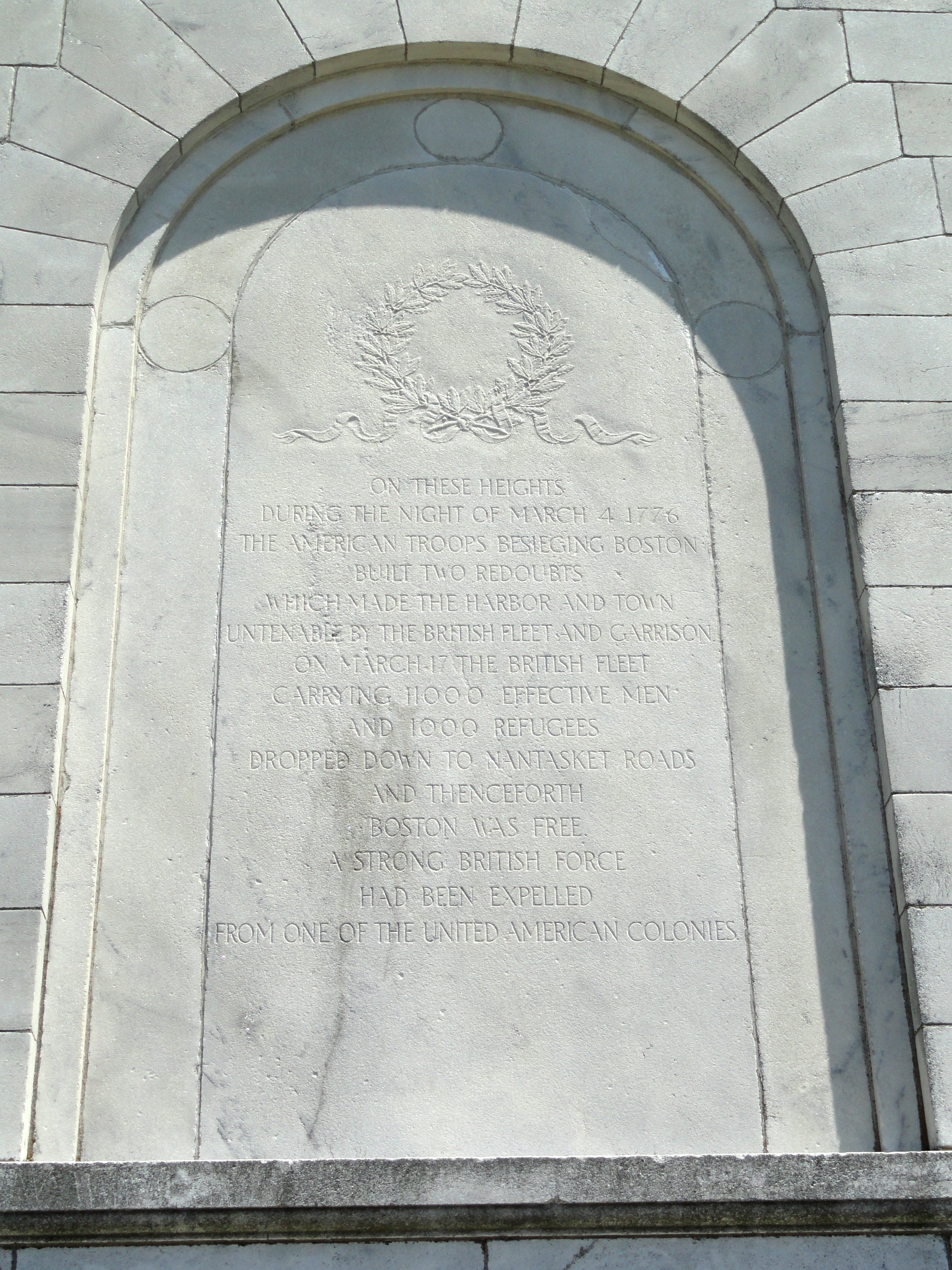
Tablet on the monument's west side

The monument's design is in the Georgian Revival architectural style. The monument consists of a four-sided structure rising 60 feet (18 m) above the ground which has small balconies on each of its sides. This column has sides measuring approximately 18.3 feet (5.6 m) long. At the top of this structure is a platform surrounded by a balustrade. Atop this platform climbs another, smaller tower which is topped by an octagonal lantern. Each column has an observation platform, with the top one giving a view of the city, Boston Harbor, and the surrounding area. The top of the monument features a cupola and a spire, topped by a weather vane. The total height of the monument is 115 feet (35 m).

While initial considerations were given to brick or granite, the monument was ultimately constructed with white marble. The structure bears an intentional similarity to the steeple of colonial meeting houses. The entrance into the structure is located on its east side, while the west side bears a tablet containing gilded letters prepared by Charles William Eliot, President of Harvard University. The inscription reads:

ON THESE HEIGHTS / DURING THE NIGHT OF MARCH 4 1776 / THE AMERICAN TROOPS BESIEGING BOSTON / BUILT TWO REDOUBTS / WHICH MADE THE HARBOR AND TOWN / UNTENABLE BY THE BRITISH FLEET AND GARRISON / ON MARCH 17 THE BRITISH FLEET / CARRYING 11000 EFFECTIVE MEN / AND 1000 REFUGEES / DROPPED DOWN TO NANTASKET ROADS / AND THENCEFORTH / BOSTON WAS FREE / A STRONG BRITISH FORCE / HAD BEEN EXPELLED / FROM ONE OF THE UNITED AMERICAN COLONIES

The monument is one of several in the city related to events from the American Revolution, including the Beacon Hill Monument and the Bunker Hill Monument. A writer for the Boston Evening Globe in 1924 called it "a fitting memorial of the colonial army's great achievement in driving the British from Boston".

== Sources ==
- A Record of the Dedication of the Monument on Dorchester Heights, South Boston. Boston: Governor of Massachusetts, Massachusetts Governor's Council, and Wright & Potter Printing Company. 1903 – via Google Books.
- "Dorchester Monument: Some of Governor's Council Made an Official Visit Today to Investigate the Causes of the Delay". The Boston Daily Globe. December 8, 1902. p. 8.
- "Governor Lays the Corner Stone". The Boston Daily Globe. May 26, 1900. p. 3.
- "Reception and Banquet at Hotel Brunswick, Wednesday Evening, August 20". Granite, Marble & Bronze. XXIII (9): 32–34. September 1913 – via Google Books.
- Happ, John E. (September 6, 2018). "The Dorchester Heights Memorial, South Boston, and the Celebration of Evacuation Day". Journal of the American Revolution. Archived from the original on October 20, 2020.
- Lacock, John Kennedy (1923). Boston and Vicinity. Boston: Chapple Publishing Company – via Google Books.
- "Dorchester Heights Monument Re-Dedicated". McCourt Construction. June 23, 1997. Archived from the original on August 10, 2020.
- "Marks an Historic Spot". Boston Evening Transcript. May 25, 1900. p. 3.
- Morgan, Keith N. (July 17, 2018). "Dorchester Heights Monument". SAH Archipedia. Society of Architectural Historians. Archived from the original on January 16, 2021.
- "Monumental News". Stone. XIX (5): 465–466. October 1899a – via Google Books.
- "Monumental News". Stone. XIX (6): 564–565. November 1899b – via Google Books.
- "Monument Nearing Completion". Boston Evening Transcript. August 16, 1900. p. 8.
- "Mystery of a Monument: South Boston to Have One". The Boston Daily Globe. January 14, 1900. p. 17.
- "One of the Handsomest in the Land". The Boston Daily Globe. February 1, 1900. p. 6.
- "South Boston in Gala Garb". The Boston Daily Globe. March 17, 1902. pp. 1, 4.
- Waterman, Nixon (November 4, 1924). "Red Letter Days in New England History". Boston Evening Globe. p. 14.
- White, Anna (March 17, 2021). "Southie History Lesson: Thomas Park". Caught In Southie. Archived from the original on March 18, 2021.
- "Will Open Early in Summer". The Boston Daily Globe. February 19, 1904. p. 7.
- "Work of Restoring Monument Finished". Boston Evening Globe. October 14, 1935. p. 11.
