= MBM scandal =

1970s American political scandal

The MBM scandal was an American political scandal of the 1970s which involved members of the Massachusetts Senate extorting money from McKee-Berger-Mansueto, Inc. (MBM), the consulting company supervising the construction of the University of Massachusetts Boston campus at Columbia Point.

== MBM contract ==
On April 22, 1970, the Bureau of Building and Construction awarded the contract to supervise construction of the University of Massachusetts Boston's new campus at Columbia Point to MBM. Their fee was to be 1.53% of the approved budget for Phase I of the project, which was an estimated $2,295,000. The contract was approved by Commissioner of Administration and Finance Donald R. Dwight.

=== Criticism ===
On February 8, 1971, Wendell Woodman, a writer whose State House column appeared in many suburban newspapers, released the first in a five-part series of articles that attacked MBM's contract as a "sweetheart deal". According to Woodman, the Bureau of Building and Construction (BBC) "never negotiated the contract in any way, and that the McKee-Berger proposal was accepted intact by the Commonwealth before the state had seen it...The contract indicates there was collusion between the BBC and McKee-Berger, and possibly conspiracy".

On February 11, Senator Joseph DiCarlo and Representatives Ralph Sirianni and William F. Hogan filed an order for the creation of a joint committee to investigate the circumstances surrounding the awarding of the contract to MBM.

== Extortion ==
On February 18, MBM President Gerald McKee and the firm's attorney, Endicott Peabody, met with DiCarlo. According to McKee and Peabody, DiCarlo told them he was going to use the investigation to embarrass Dwight (who by then had been elected Lieutenant Governor), whom he viewed as a potential opponent in a future gubernatorial election, and would not consider the case on its merits. Anthony Mansueto, one of the company's senior vice presidents, then sought the help of Senator James A. Kelly, Jr. On March 17 the two met in Palm Beach, Florida. According to Mansueto, Kelly told him that he had talked with DiCarlo and "For $100,000, MBM's problems could be solved". The company did not pay the money and chose to let the matter pass. On March 29, 1971, a joint legislative committee was formed. DiCarlo was named the Senate Chairman and Sirianni was named the House Chairman. Senators DiCarlo, George V. Kenneally Jr., and Robert Cawley and Representatives Sirianni, Paul Menton, J. Laurence Golden, J. Hilary Rockett, and James F. Hart were named to the committee. The committee held four hearings between May 5, 1971, and July 29, 1971. After the final hearing, McKee was afraid that his company would lose its contract. William Harding, MBM's head of sales, then talked to his friend, Senator Ronald MacKenzie, about the probable results of the investigation.

According to Harding, MacKenzie told him that a favorable committee report would cost between $30,000 and $40,000. McKee and Mansueto concluded that the only way for MBM to keep their contract would be to pay the money. Harding made the first payment on October 11. Because the company was having cash flow problems, the payment was only $5,000. After the payment was made, MacKenzie gave Harding a draft copy of the committee's report, which he gave to McKee. McKee found the report to be ambiguous and dictated a memo about the good work MBM had done on the project, which Harding delivered to MacKenzie for inclusion in the final report. The next month, the committee issued its report, half of which was McKee's memo. A second $5,000 payment was made by Harding on November 20. McKee made a $10,000 payment on January 20, 1972. Harding made the fourth payment ($10,000) on February 18 and Jack Thomas, head of MBM's Boston office, made the final payment (also $10,000) on May 12.

All of the payments were made to MacKenzie, several of which were made at a bar near MBM's Boston office. On July 6, DiCarlo and MacKenzie visited McKee in his New York City office. According to McKee, DiCarlo chastised him, saying that "They shouldn't have to chase MBM like creditors" and that the delayed payments had caused him "difficulty and embarrassment because he had to share them with others".

== Investigation, indictment, and trial ==
In the spring of 1975, Federal investigators were looking into corruption in Pennsylvania. While under interrogation by a Federal prosecutor during a grand jury, an MBM official was asked if he knew of any similar corruption in any other state. He replied that he was aware of corruption in Massachusetts. The testimony was then forwarded to the Federal Bureau of Investigation's Boston field office. Special Agent in Charge James O. Newpher assigned Agent Robert Sheenhan to the case, who investigated it in conjunction with U.S. Attorney James N. Gabriel.

On August 13, 1976, a grand jury indicted DiCarlo and MacKenzie on charges of extortion, conspiracy, and other related offenses. Kelly was named as an unindicted co-conspirator, however the judge ruled that the prosecution had failed to link Kelly to the conspiracy and ordered that all references to him be removed from the indictment (Kelly's name was replaced with "John Doe" in the indictment). DiCarlo and Mackenzie were charged with violating the Hobbs Act, which forbids extortion by public officials, and the Travel Act, which forbids crossing state lines for the purpose of extortion. On August 20, DiCarlo and Mackenzie pleaded not guilty and were released on $1,000 bail. The trial began on January 24, 1977, in United States District Court in Boston. Walter Jay Skinner was the presiding judge. First Assistant U.S. Attorney Edward J. Lee was the prosecuting attorney. Walter J. Hurley and Robert V. Mulkern were the defense lawyers. After a twenty-three-day trial, DiCarlo and MacKenzie were found guilty on all eight counts of corruption. They were sentenced to one year in prison and fined $5,000.

== Senate Ethics Committee investigation ==
On February 28, DiCarlo and MacKenzie resigned their leadership positions (DiCarlo was Majority Leader and MacKenzie was Assistant Minority Whip). However, they refused to resign from the Senate. As a result of the scandal, the Senate created a standing committee on ethics. The committee consisted of three Democrats and two Republicans appointed by Senate President Kevin B. Harrington in consultation with Minority Leader John F. Parker. Senators Chester G. Atkins, John Olver, Robert E. McCarthy, William L. Saltonstall, and John Aylmer were the committee's first members and Watergate prosecutor James Vorenberg served as its first legal counsel.

Shortly after the committee's formation, it was tasked with investigating the conduct of DiCarlo and MacKenzie. On March 31, MacKenzie resigned from the Senate. The following day the committee recommended that DiCarlo be expelled from the Senate. On April 4 the Senate voted 28 to 8 to expel DiCarlo. It was the first time in the Senate's 196-year history that a member had been expelled.

== Ward Commission ==
In 1978, Representatives Philip W. Johnston and Andrew Card filed legislation to create the Special Commission Concerning State and County Buildings. The committee was granted the power to issue subpoenas and offer immunity in exchange for testimony. Governor Michael Dukakis chose Amherst College President John William Ward to chair the committee. The commission spent two and a half years investigating the awarding of architectural and construction contracts in Massachusetts over the previous two decades. It issued its final report on December 31, 1980. It found that Governors Endicott Peabody, John A. Volpe, and Francis W. Sargent routinely awarded state design contracts in exchange for political contributions. According to the report, $7.73 billion of the $17.1 billion spent on public construction jobs had been spent on projects with severe defects. Among the defects were leaking roofs and defective walls at Cape Cod Community College, the inability of the Salem State College library to support the weight of the books it was built to hold, the inability to see the stage from a third of the seats in the Boston State College auditorium, faulty heating and ventilation system at UMASS Boston, bricks falling from the facade of the UMASS Boston library, and a malfunctioning locking system at the Worcester County Jail. The report also found that $48.7 million had been spent on projects that were designed, but never built.

== Aftermath ==
Due to the open-ended nature of the contract, MBM received $6 million for the UMASS project.

After his expulsion, DiCarlo announced that he would run in the special election to regain his seat. He lost the Democratic primary to Frank J. Mastrocola, Jr., a 24-year-old one-term Alderman from Everett who ran on the slogan "If DiCarlo Wins, Massachusetts Loses".

Before going to prison, DiCarlo named a number of other politicians who received money from MBM, including Harrington, Kelly, Speaker David M. Bartley, and Boston Mayor Kevin White. All denied accepting money, but Harrington's political career was effectively over due to the scandal. In December 1977 he admitted to cashing a $2,000 check from MBM. After this disclosure he abandoned plans to challenge Governor Michael Dukakis' renomination in 1978. On July 31, 1978, he resigned as Senate President. William Bulger, who succeeded DiCarlo as Majority Leader following his resignation succeeded Harrington as president. Bulger went on to become the Senate's longest tenured President.

DiCarlo served ten months at the Federal Correctional Institution in Allenwood. After his release from prison, DiCarlo was unable to find employment for six months, but eventually accepted a job with a Revere construction company. He started out hauling wheelbarrows of cement, but was later moved to doing estimates.

MacKenzie also served ten months in Allenwood. After his release in October 1978 he did paralegal work in the offices of attorney Richard M. Riley and State Senator Michael LoPresti Jr. On August 19, 1981, the Burlington Board of Selectmen voted 3 to 2 to make MacKenzie the town's veteran's agent. In December 1983 the Massachusetts Board of Bar Examiners ruled that MacKenzie, who graduated from Suffolk University Law School in 1976, was eligible to be lawyer in spite of his conviction.

Kelly was later convicted of extorting $34,500 from a Worcester architectural firm. He was sentenced to two years in prison. After his release he spent many years living in Florida and later moved to Colorado, where he died on August 9, 2013.
