= Gerald McKee =

American construction management executive

Gerald McKee (June 11, 1929 – January 13, 2013) was an American construction management executive who was president of McKee-Berger-Mansueto (MBM). His activism landed him on the Nixon enemies list.

McKee was at the center of a 1977 scandal surrounding the construction of the University of Massachusetts Boston campus at Columbia Point. State senators Joseph DiCarlo and Ronald MacKenzie were convicted on extortion charges for accepting payoffs from MBM in exchange for a favorable report from the legislative committee investigating their contract.
