= Georgette Watson =

American disability-rights activist

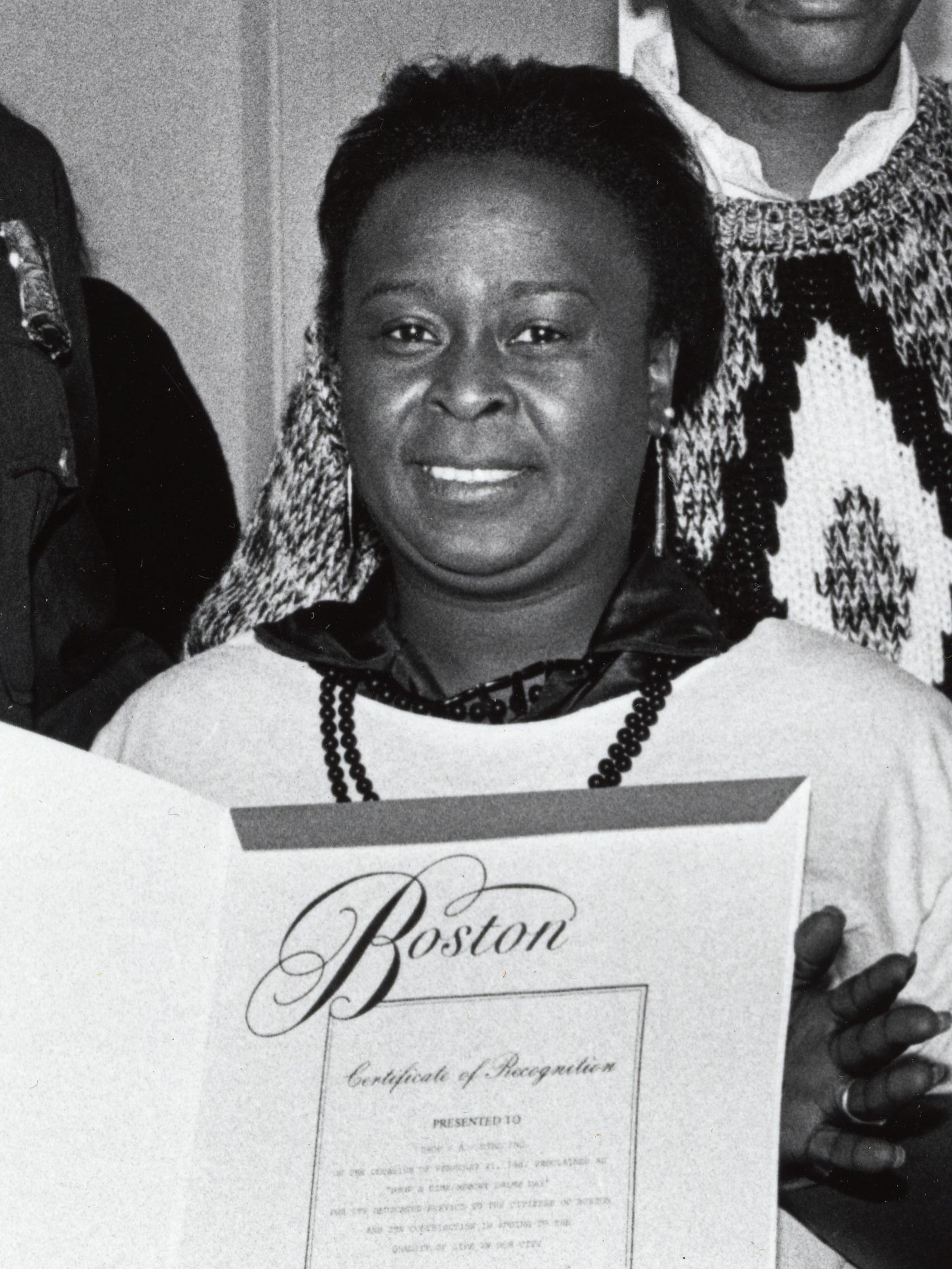
- Georgette Watson, pictured c. 1984-1987
- Born: 1943 or 1944; Philadelphia, Pennsylvania, U.S.
- Died: August 29, 2008 (aged 64); Baltimore, Maryland, U.S.
- Education: University of Massachusetts Boston (B.A.); Antioch University (M.Ed.)
- Occupation: Anti-crime activist
- Known for: Drop-a-Dime

Georgette Watson (1943 or 1944 – August 29, 2008) was an American anti-drug activist.

== Life and education ==
Watson was born in Philadelphia. She later lived in New York, the Dorchester neighborhood of Boston, Massachusetts, and Baltimore, Maryland. She had three children, who she raised as a single parent. In around 1980 she married James O'Connor.

Watson earned a bachelor's degree and paralegal certification from the University of Massachusetts Boston, and later earned a master's degree in education from Antioch University. In 1991 she was awarded an honorary doctorate by Emmanuel College.

Watson died in Baltimore, Maryland on August 29, 2008, from complications of pneumonia and kidney disease.

== Career and activism ==
=== Anti-drug activism ===
In the early 1980s, there was significant violence in Boston as drug gangs from New York and Detroit attempted to expand into the city. Watson, Reverend Bruce H. Wall, activist Ben Haith, and others began occupying empty apartments in places that experienced significant drug activity, including the Lenox Street Projects and Orchard Park in Roxbury, where they attempted to discourage drug dealing by engaging with the community, and to draw police and press attention. In 1983, Watson and Wall cofounded Drop-a-Dime, an anti-crime organization which operated a hotline through which tips were confidentially passed from citizens to Boston police and federal agencies. The name was a reference to dropping a dime, slang for putting a coin into a payphone to inform police of a crime. According to Wall, the hotline handled over 600 calls a month, and led to hundreds of arrests. In 1986, Bill Weld credited Drop-a-Dime with tips that led to imprisonment of members of the Capsule Boys and another large drug gang active in Boston. The group also taught residents to gather information to help police, and to mass-call police in emergencies. The organization was responsible for the shuttering of some businesses and other buildings that were home to drug activity, either by pressuring landlords or through a state law that allowed courts to close buildings that were the location of two or more drug crimes within five years.

Watson was also sometimes critical of police, who she said responded more aggressively to crimes in Roxbury than in other parts of the city. She also described racism among Boston police officers, and "cultural conflict" from police who were not from the communities they were policing: "We do need police in the community. But we need police that understand the community, that culturally understand it. When you have police officers that were born and raised in South Boston, I think there's a cultural conflict when they come in [to Roxbury]." In a 1987 interview about a documentary about policing titled Street Cop, Watson said, "We have to look at what the police is really doing to our community. Are they helping? Or are they helping to destroy it?"

In 1989, Watson was given 24-hour police protection after a $5,000 bounty (equivalent to $12,700 in 2024) bounty was reportedly placed on her head by the Franklin Hill Giants gang, who were allegedly commissioned by the Castlegate gang to kill or injure her. Watson believed she was targeted due to her support for police stop-and-search policies.

In 1991, Watson was appointed to lead the Governor's Alliance Against Drugs. While in the position, she focused on building crime prevention programs rather than focusing on enforcement. She led the group for five years, until she was fired after a state audit reportedly uncovered mismanagement and mishandling of finances. Watson allegedly used state funds to take a trip to Aruba with another staffer, and the audit also alleged that Watson and an assistant had used a shadow nonprofit to take a $3,000 payment (equivalent to $6,000 in 2024). Watson countered that the Aruba trip was business-related, and alleged she had been fired due to racial discrimination. She subsequently filed a lawsuit against the state, but was unsuccessful.

=== Politics ===
In 1986, Watson was a candidate in the Suffolk County Sheriff's Department election, but was ultimately defeated by Robert Rufo. In 1990, Watson ran for a seat in the Massachusetts Senate. She narrowly lost the election to Bill Owens, by a margin of 400 votes out of 13,130 total ballots.

=== Other work ===
After being fired from the Governor's Alliance Against Drugs, Watson moved to Baltimore, Maryland. Experiencing illnesses including breast cancer and kidney issues, she encountered difficulties using the Maryland Transit Administration (MTA) to attend dialysis appointments. After writing letters to the MTA about her experiences, she accepted a job with them improving accessibility for disabled people. She also became an adjunct professor at the Baltimore City Community College.

== Awards and recognition ==
In 1987, Essence awarded Watson for her social service. In 1990, Watson was recognized with a community leadership award from the Federal Bureau of Investigation and Drug Enforcement Administration. Watson was one of the first people to receive a Points of Light award from President George H. W. Bush.
