= Lorenz Muther Jr. =

American politician

Lorenz Francis Muther Jr.
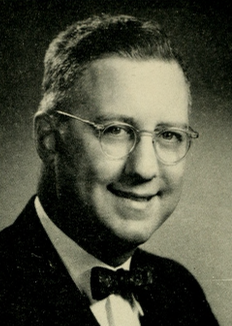
- Muther, circa 1961

Member of the Massachusetts House of Representatives from the 5th Middlesex district
- In office January 4, 1961 – January 6, 1965 Serving with Arthur Graham Heaney (1961-1963); Irving Fishman (1963-1965)
- Preceded by: Irene Thresher
- Succeeded by: Theodore D. Mann

Personal details
- Born: September 26, 1908 Newton, Massachusetts
- Died: November 11, 1981 (aged 73) Southbury, Connecticut
- Party: Republican
- Relations: Richard Muther (brother)

Lorenz Francis Muther Jr. (September 26, 1908 – November 11, 1981) was an American politician who served as a member of the Massachusetts House of Representatives from 1961 to 1965.

== Biography ==
Muther was born in Newton, Massachusetts on September 26, 1908, to parents Lorenz F. Muther Sr. and Josephine Muther (née Ashleman). He was the brother of industrial engineer Richard Muther.

He was first elected in 1960 to represent Massachusetts House of Representatives' 5th Middlesex district, and was reelected in 1962. He lost re-election in 1964 to Theodore D. Mann.

Muther worked as a lawyer, and was the executive director of the Newton Taxpayers Association. In 1965, after leaving public office, he became a lobbyist for Massachusetts Citizens for Fair Taxes.

He died on November 11, 1981, at his home in Southbury, Connecticut.
