= Gateway cities =

Gateway cities may refer to:

- Antarctic Gateway Cities, from which ships bound for Antarctica typically set out
- The Gateway Cities region, Southeast Los Angeles County
- Massachusetts gateway cities, a series of midsize urban centers identified by the Brookings Institution, the Massachusetts Institute for a New Commonwealth MassINC, and the Commonwealth government as those facing "stubborn social and economic challenges" while retaining "many assets with unrealized potential."

== See also ==
- Business improvement districts in the United States
