= James A. Kelly Jr. =

American politician

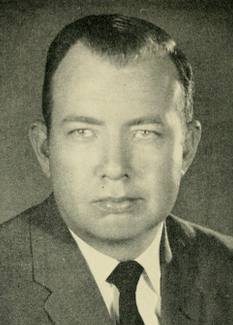

Member of the Massachusetts Senate
- In office 1965–1979
- Preceded by: Joseph Gibney
- Succeeded by: Louis Bertonazzi

Member of the Massachusetts House of Representatives
- In office 1959–1965
- Preceded by: John E. Riley
- Succeeded by: Albert Nash

Personal details
- Born: May 11, 1926 Worcester, Massachusetts
- Died: August 9, 2013 (aged 87) Aurora, Colorado
- Resting place: Leicester, Massachusetts
- Party: Democratic
- Education: Clark University
- Occupation: Accountant; State Legislator

James A. Kelly Jr. (May 11, 1926 – August 9, 2013) was an American politician who served as a Democrat in the Massachusetts House of Representatives from 1959 to 1965 and the Massachusetts Senate from 1965 to 1979. In 1983, he was convicted of extortion.

== Early life ==
Kelly was born on May 11, 1926, in Worcester, Massachusetts, to James and Florence Kelly. During World War II he served in the United States Navy. He attended Becker Junior College and in 1950 earned a Bachelor of Applied Arts from Clark University. While at Clark, Kelly met and married Elisabeth Kelly. He became a Certified Public Accountant and established a practice in Leicester, Massachusetts.

== Political career ==
Prior to becoming a state legislator, Kelly served one term on the Leicester School Committee and was clerk and treasurer of the Oxford – Rochdale Sewer District.

In 1958, Kelly was elected to the Massachusetts House of Representatives by defeating Republican incumbent John E. Riley 6456 votes to 6045. Six years later he ran for the 4th Worcester District Senate seat that was being vacated by Joseph Gibney. He won a five-way Democratic primary with 37% of the vote and won the general election with 66%.

From 1965 to 1971, Kelly chaired the Joint Committee on State Administration. In 1966, he also chaired the Special Committee Special Senate Committee to investigate the activities of the commissioner of administration, John J. McCarthy. In this role, Kelly had an opportunity to bring down the administration of popular Republican Governor John A. Volpe. However, Kelly, according to a Volpe aide, assisted the governor's team by keeping them abreast of what was going on behind the scenes and assisting them in planning their strategy. Many, including fellow committee member Beryl Cohen, believed that Kelly leaked a damaging report to the Volpe administration, which gave it time to counterattack. After the investigation, Kelly enjoyed a close relationship with Volpe's Commissioner of Administration and Finance Anthony DeFalco and was able to get patronage from the Volpe's administration. In 1971, Kelly backed Kevin B. Harrington for the Senate Presidency over Ways and Means Committee Chairman James F. Burke. Harrington defeated Burke and chose Kelly to replace Burke as Chairman of the Senate Ways and Means Committee, one of the most powerful positions in the legislature.

During his tenure in the legislature, Kelly was described as businesslike, accessible, and accommodating and was the only legislative leader to openly describe himself as a liberal. He increased funding for existing social welfare programs and budgeted money for new ones, eliminated funding for the Massachusetts State Police's Subversive Activities Control Unit, supported constructing a new stadium, opposed using state funds to pay for desegregation in Boston Public Schools, and played a major role in establishing the University of Massachusetts Medical School in Worcester. Kelly was honored by Massachusetts Fair Share, Public Interest Research Group, and Americans for Democratic Action for his work for the poor, elderly, and disabled. In recognition of his power as Chairman of Ways and Means and his effectiveness as a member of the Senate leadership, Kelly was widely known as the "Wizard of Oxford".

== MBM Scandal ==
In 1976, federal prosecutors sought to have Kelly named as an unindicted co-conspirator for his role in the MBM scandal. According to Anthony Mansueto, one of MBM's senior vice presidents, Kelly told him that he had talked with Senator Joseph DiCarlo, chairman of a special legislative committee investigating one of the company's contracts, and "For $100,000, MBM's problems could be solved". However, Judge Walter Jay Skinner ruled that the prosecution had failed to link Kelly to the conspiracy and ordered that all references to him be removed from the indictment (Kelly's name was replaced with "John Doe" in the indictment).

During the MBM investigation, it was also alleged that Kelly had endorsed a $2,000 check from MBM to Boston Mayor Kevin White and that Kelly himself had received a $1,000 from MBM. Campaign contributions from corporations were illegal in Massachusetts. Kelly denied the allegations and the state declined to prosecute.

On December 15, 1977, Kelly announced that he would not run for reelection in 1978. He said that although the MBM scandal had no effect on him in his district, it likely meant that he could never advance in the Senate leadership. It was also possible that William Bulger, who was likely to become the next Senate President, would not allow Kelly to remain as Ways and Means Chairman.

After his departure from the Senate, Kelly moved to Miami Beach, Florida.

== Extortion case ==
In 1980, Worcester architect Frank Masiello testified before the Special Commission Concerning State and County Buildings that his company paid Kelly's accounting firm a $500 monthly retainer after Kelly threatened to have his firm's contracts with the state cancelled. The payments allegedly began in January 1971 when Kelly became chairman of the Ways and Means Committee and ended in September 1976. He also stated that his company paid for Kelly's travel, entertainment, and YMCA memberships. Kelly's firm received a total of $9,500, but never performed any work for Masiello and Associates. James L. Bauchat of Masiello and Associates' parent company Kassuba Development Corp., testified that Kelly demanded $10,000 in exchange for state design contracts. Kelly appeared before the Commission on June 27, 1980, pleaded the Fifth Amendment and refused to answer any questions.

On September 23, 1980, Kelly was indicted on charges of extorting $34,500 from Masiello and Associates. The indictment was based on the Hobbs Act, which makes it illegal for a public official to solicit money from people trying to influence his official conduct. On September 30 he pleaded not guilty and was released by United States magistrate judge Peter W. Princi on $10,000 bond. His trial began on March 18, 1981, and ended on April 29. After eleven hours of deliberation, the jury remained deadlocked 11 to 1 for conviction. Judge Joseph L. Tauro declared a mistrial.

Before the retrial, the prosecution attempted to have Tauro removed from the case, citing his pro-defense rulings during the trial and having received assistance from Kelly when Kelly was chair of a committee investigating the Volpe administration and Tauro was Volpe's chief legal counsel. The United States Court of Appeals ruled that there was no legal basis to bar Tauro from presiding over the retrial. Also prior to the retrial, two of the prosecution's witnesses had committed perjury.

Kelly's retrial began on November 15, 1982, and ended on December 22. The next day, the jury found Kelly guilty of extortion. On January 20, 1983, Judge Rya W. Zobel sentenced him to two years in prison. He was allowed to remain out of prison until the outcome of his appeal, which was rejected on December 1, 1983. Kelly then sought to have his sentence delayed until April 1984 so he could complete his studies for a master's degree in business administration at Florida International University. The request was denied and Kelly began his sentence in March 1984. He was incarcerated in Federal Prison Camp, Eglin.

== Personal life ==
Kelly and his wife had eight children (five sons and three daughters). One of his daughters died as an infant.

In 1970, Kelly and his wife separated. After their separation, Kelly moved to the Jamaicaway Towers in Boston. While residing in Boston he was known to have breakfast at the Ritz, drive a Mercedes-Benz, go out with young women, and play a daily game of squash at the Harvard Club of Boston.

== Later life and death ==
Kelly spent his later years in Colorado Springs, Colorado. He died on August 9, 2013, in Aurora, Colorado, from complications following a hip fracture. He was buried in Leicester, Massachusetts, near his parents and daughter.

Political offices
Preceded by James F. Burke	Chairman of the Massachusetts Senate Ways and Means Committee; 1971–1979	Succeeded by Chester G. Atkins
