= Irene Thresher =

American politician

Irene Kattwinkell Thresher
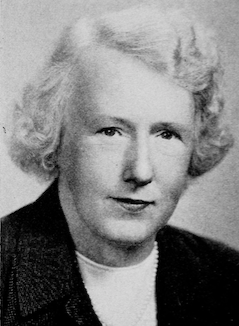
- Thresher, circa 1953

Member of the Massachusetts House of Representatives from the 5th Middlesex district
- In office January 3, 1951 – January 4, 1961
- Preceded by: Margaret Jane Spear
- Succeeded by: Lorenz Muther Jr.

Personal details
- Born: July 6, 1900 Cologne, Germany
- Died: August 25, 1981 (aged 81) Winter Park, Florida
- Party: Republican

Irene Kattwinkell Thresher (July 6, 1900-August 25, 1981) was a member of the Great and General Court of Massachusetts.

== Personal life ==
Irene Kattwinkell was born in Cologne, Germany and studied at Vassar College. She was awarded an honorary doctorate from Emerson College. After college, she lived in Cambridge, Massachusetts and then Newton, Massachusetts. After leaving the legislature, she moved to Cocoa Beach, Florida and then Winter Park, Florida. She was married to B. Alden Thresher, with whom she had a son, Colby, and two daughters, Sonia and Rosemary. Before entering the General Court, she was a housewife.

== Political career ==
From 1941 to 1950, Thresher was a member of the Newton School Committee.

Thresher served in the Massachusetts House of Representatives as a Republican from 1951 to 1961. In addition to serving on the education and public welfare committees, she was also the first woman to serve on the ways and means committee. After her initial election in 1950, she was elected president of the freshman class, the first woman to hold that position. Her priorities as a legislator included education and the elderly.
