= Paula Lewellen =

American politician

Member of the Massachusetts House of Representatives from the 5th Middlesex district
- In office November 10, 1977 – 1978
- Preceded by: Carol Amick

Personal details
- Born: November 6, 1909 Pennsylvania, U.S.
- Died: November 3, 1994 (aged 84) Bedford, Massachusetts, U.S.

Paula Krauth Lewellen (November 6, 1909 – November 3, 1994) was an American Republican politician from Bedford, Massachusetts. She represented the Fifth Middlesex district in the Massachusetts House of Representatives from 1977 to 1978.

== Political career ==
Lewellen was elected to the Massachusetts House of Representatives in 1977, filling the vacancy left by Democrat Carol Amick, who resigned in order to run for the Massachusetts Senate. Lewellen ran unopposed in the primary election. In what The Sun called an "upset victory", she won the general election by a margin of just 52 votes, defeating Democrat Patricia Leiby 1,079-1,027. She was sworn in on November 10.

Lewellen unsuccessfully ran for the Massachusetts Senate in 1978, losing to incumbent Democrat Carol Amick.
