= David Linsky =

American attorney and politician

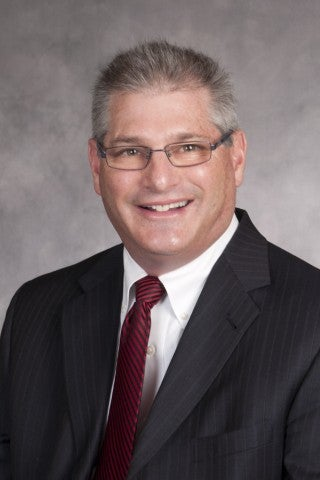

Member of the Massachusetts House of Representatives from the 5th Middlesex district
- Incumbent
- Assumed office January 6, 1999
- Preceded by: Douglas Stoddart

Personal details
- Born: David Paul Linsky; October 16, 1957 (age 68) Boston, Massachusetts, U.S.
- Party: Democratic
- Spouse: Lois (divorced)
- Children: 3
- Education: Colby College (BA); Boston College (JD)
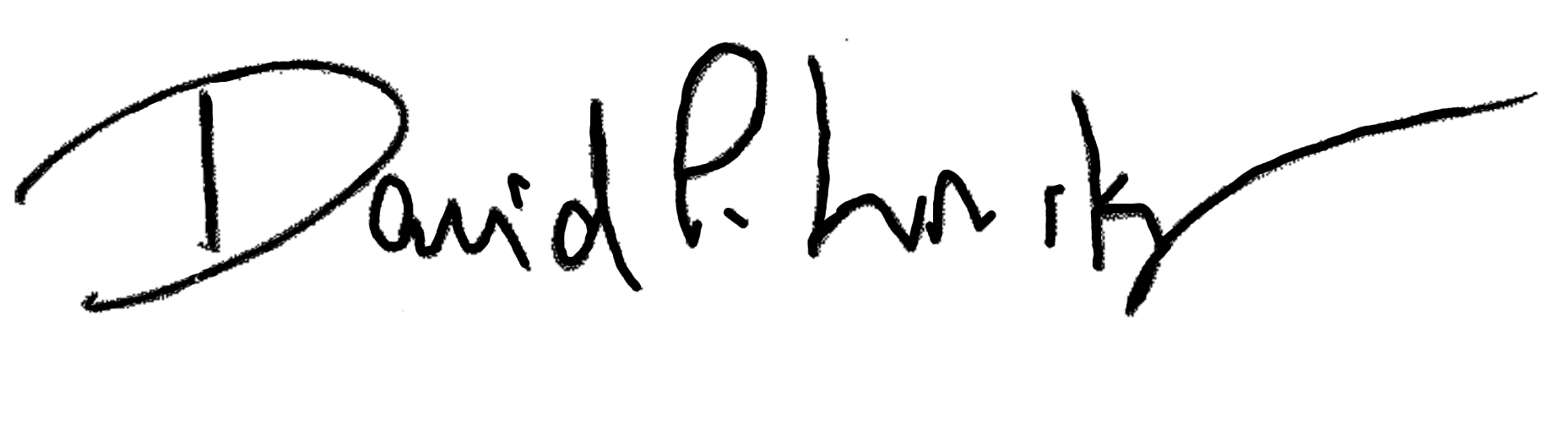
- Signature
- Website: Campaign & District Website

David Paul Linsky (born October 16, 1957) is an American lawyer and politician who currently represents the 5th Middlesex District in the Massachusetts House of Representatives.

== Career ==
=== Early life and education ===
A lifelong resident of Natick, Massachusetts, Linsky graduated from Natick High School and went on to earn his B.A. from Colby College and his J.D. from Boston College Law School.

=== Legal career and politics ===
He is a graduate of the Career Prosecutor School in Houston, Texas. He served on the Natick Democratic Town Committee. From 1980 to 1999, Linsky was a Natick Town Meeting Member. From 1984 to 1988 he served on the Natick Conservation Commission.

=== Assistant District Attorney ===
From 1983 to 1988 and again from 1991 to 1999, Linsky was an Assistant District Attorney in Middlesex County. As an ADA he prosecuted hundreds of cases including sexual assault, murder, and white collar crime.

=== State representative ===
Linsky was first elected to the House in 1999 in the special election to succeed Douglas Stoddart, who resigned after he was appointed as a judge in Middlesex District Court. Linsky defeated former Natick Selectman John F. Moran in the Democratic primary 3,181 votes to 2,105. In the general election he defeated Republican Kenneth B. Hoyt and Independent Jerry L. Pierce 3,846 votes to Hoyt's 1,837 and Pierce's 47.

Linsky served as Chair of the House Committee on Post Audit and Oversight for twelve years, and formerly served as the House Chair of the Joint Committee on Federal Stimulus Oversight.

Linsky is considered a national leader in state legislation in the area of gun violence prevention, was an original supporter of Massachusetts' first in the nation Universal Health Insurance Law, the forerunner to the Affordable Care Act, and was an early leader in Massachusetts Equal Marriage movement.

He also was instrumental in securing funding for several new public schools in his District, including Natick High School and the Kennedy and Wilson Middle Schools.

== Personal life ==
He and his former wife Lois have three children.

On July 1, 2021, the Internal Revenue Service filed a lien against Linsky for $154,067 in unpaid income taxes related to his law office income. Linsky stated that the debt was due to "a number of family issues and business issues, unrelated to [his] work as a state representative". He also stated that he was on a payment plan to repay the taxes, had already paid back some of the money, was current in his payments, and was appealing the lien.

== See also ==
- 2019–2020 Massachusetts legislature
- 2021–2022 Massachusetts legislature
