= Douglas Stoddart =

American politician

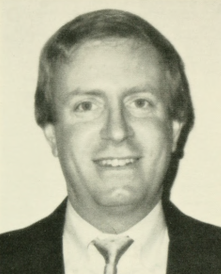
- Portrait of Douglas W. Stoddart

Member of the Massachusetts House of Representatives from the 5th Middlesex District
- In office 1991–1999
- Preceded by: Joseph M. Connolly
- Succeeded by: David Linsky

Personal details
- Born: March 5, 1952 (age 74) Cincinnati, Ohio
- Party: Republican
- Education: Colgate University; Syracuse University College of Law
- Occupation: Attorney; Politician; Judge

Douglas W. Stoddart (born March 5, 1952, in Cincinnati, Ohio) is a private attorney licensed in the Commonwealth of Massachusetts.

A native of Wellesley, Massachusetts, Stoddart graduated from Colgate University in 1974, where he played on the Red Raiders men's soccer team, and Syracuse University College of Law in 1977. From 1978 to 1986 he worked for the Monroe County, New York District Attorney's Office. In 1986, Stoddart returned to Massachusetts to work as a private practice attorney in Natick.

From 1991 to 1999, Stoddart represented the 5th Middlesex District in the Massachusetts House of Representatives. He resigned his seat after he was appointed as a judge in Middlesex District Court, where he served for 17 years before returning to private practice.
