= Boston Housing Authority =

Public agency in Boston, Massachusetts, United States

Agency overview
- Formed: October 1, 1935
- Jurisdiction: Boston, Massachusetts
- Headquarters: 52 Chauncy Street, Boston, MA 02111
- Annual budget: $180 million
- Agency executive: Kenzie Bok (2023-)
- Website: bostonhousing.org

The Boston Housing Authority (BHA) is a public agency within the city of Boston, Massachusetts that provides subsidized public housing to low- and moderate-income families and individuals. The BHA is not a municipal agency, but a separate local entity.

In the federal government model of the United States Department of Housing and Urban Development (HUD), BHA is a public housing agency. As such, BHA administers federal government assistance programs and monies for locally subsidized housing.

With 70 developments, and serving almost 26,000 people across over 12,600 public housing units, it is the largest public housing authority in New England. It also offers partial subsidies for private housing, assisting another 32,000 people, and administers federal Section 8 vouchers.

The agency's performance is periodically reviewed by a nine-member council, the BHA Monitoring Committee, which reports to the mayor.

== History ==
The BHA was established on October 1, 1935 by the mayor and city council of Boston under Massachusetts General Law allowing cities and towns of Massachusetts to establish housing authorities. According to Massachusetts law, its mission was to be responsible for providing decent, safe and sanitary housing for families unable to afford housing without public subsidies. BHA was also charged with clearing substandard, decadent or blighted open areas and urban redevelopment, although this responsibility was later transferred to the Boston Redevelopment Authority (BRA) in 1957.

The first BHA housing projects were opened between 1938 and 1942.

Under the tenure of Boston Mayor John F. Collins (1960–1968), the BHA segregated the public housing developments in the city, moving black families into the development at Columbia Point while reserving developments in South Boston for white families who started refusing assignment to the Columbia Point project by the early 1960s. In 1962, upon receipt of a lawsuit filed by a civil rights group, the West Broadway Housing Development was desegregated after having been designated by the city for white-only occupancy since 1941. In the same year, the Mission Hill project had 1,024 families (all white), while the Mission Hill Extension project across the street had 580 families (of which 500 were black), and in 1967, when the city government agreed to fully desegregate the developments, the projects were still 97 percent white and 98 percent black respectively.

The management and governance of the BHA is different from that of other housing authorities since 1975, when BHA was sued in Boston City Housing Court by a group of BHA tenants, represented by Greater Boston Legal Services, regarding poor conditions in housing projects under the authority's control. As a result of the ruling which was in favor of the tenants, a court-appointed master prepared a report listing recommendations that provided the basis for a consent decree signed in 1977 by BHA, Greater Boston Legal Services and the Boston Public Housing Tenants Policy Council. The decree listed a series of improvements that BHA was supposed to make over the course of three years. The master, responsible for monitoring BHA's compliance with the consent decree, gave approval for all major decisions made by the BHA board and administrator.

In 1979, the judge ruled that BHA had failed to satisfactorily fulfill the terms of the consent decree and BHA was placed in receivership, with its board of commissioners and administrator replaced by a court-appointed receiver. Since 1990, when the receivership ended, BHA has been directed by an administrator whose activities are reviewed by a nine-member monitoring committee appointed by the mayor of Boston.

In 2023, Boston Mayor Michelle Wu appointed Kenzie Bok as BHA Administrator.

== List of developments ==
As of 2014, the BHA oversees 70 developments across 13 Boston neighborhoods. Of them, 38 are designated for elderly and disabled housing (two of which contain additional family units) and 32 are designated for families (one of which contains additional elderly and disabled units).

=== Back Bay ===
- St. Botolph Apartments (elderly, disabled)

=== Brighton ===
- Commonwealth (family)
- Commonwealth Elderly (elderly, disabled)
- Fanueil (family)
- J.J. Carroll Apartments (elderly, disabled)
- Patricia White (elderly, disabled)
- Washington Street (elderly, disabled)

=== Charlestown ===
- Basilica (family)
- Charlestown (family)
- General Warren (elderly, disabled)

=== Dorchester ===
- Annapolis Street (elderly, disabled)
- Ashmont Street (elderly, disabled)
- Bellflower Street (elderly, disabled)
- Codman Apartments (elderly, disabled)
- Franklin Field (family, elderly, disabled)
- Franklin Hill (family)
- Lower Mills (elderly, disabled)
- Meade Apartments (elderly, disabled)
- Pasciucco Apartments (elderly, disabled)
- Peabody Square (elderly, disabled)

=== East Boston ===
- Heritage Apartments (elderly, disabled, family)
- Orient Heights (family)

=== Hyde Park ===
- Davison (elderly, disabled)
- Fairmount (family)
- Hassan Apartments (elderly, disabled)
- Joseph C. Malone Apartments (elderly, disabled)

=== Jamaica Plain ===
- Amory Street (elderly, disabled)
- Bromley Park (family, elderly, disabled)
- Heath Street (family)
- Pond Street (elderly, disabled)
- South Street (family)

=== Mattapan ===
- Gallivan Boulevard (family)
- Groveland (elderly, disabled)

=== North End ===
- Ausonia Homes North End (elderly, disabled)

=== Roslindale ===
- Archdale (family)
- Roslyn Apartments (elderly, disabled)
- Washington-Beech (family)

=== Roxbury ===
- Alice Heyward Taylor (family)
- Highland Park (family)
- Holgate Apartments (elderly, disabled)
- Rev. M.L.K Jr. Towers (elderly, disabled)
- Rockland Towers West (elderly, disabled)
- Spring Street West (elderly, disabled)
- Walnut Park (elderly, disabled)
- Whittier Street (family)
- Lenox Street (family)
- Orchard Park (family) (demolished)

=== South Boston ===
- Foley Apartments (elderly, disabled)
- Old Harbor Housing Project (family)
  - (formally known as the Mary Ellen McCormack Housing Project)
- Monsignor Powers (elderly, disabled)
- Old Colony Housing Project (family)
- West Broadway (D street projects) (family)
- West Ninth Street (elderly, disabled)

=== South End ===
- Camden Street (family)
- Cathedral (family)
- Eva White (elderly, disabled)
- Frederick Douglass (elderly, disabled)
- Hampton House (elderly, disabled)
- Lenox Street (family)
- Rutland/East Springfield Street (family)
- Torre Unidad (elderly, disabled)
- Washington Manor (elderly, disabled)
- West Newton Street (family)

== See also ==
- List of public housing developments in the United States
- Property management
- Public housing in the United States
