= Joan E. Goody =

American architect (1935–2009)

Joan Edelman Goody (December 1, 1935 – September 8, 2009) was an American architect based in Boston, Massachusetts, where she served on the faculty of the Mayor's Institute for City Design, and earlier as chair of the Boston Civic Design Commission. She was known for her influence in the latter part of the 20th and early 21st century on Boston modern architecture and historic preservation. She was also the author of several books on architecture, including an early work on the emerging modern style in Boston, New Architecture in Boston.

Goody was a Fellow of the American Institute of Architects and a principal of Goody, Clancy & Associates, Inc of Boston.

== Early life and education ==
Joan Edelman Goody was born in Brooklyn, New York in 1935 and grew up in the Flatbush neighborhood of Brooklyn. She attended the School of the Ethical Culture Society.

Ms. Goody attended Cornell University. She spent her junior year studying in Paris, France and she went to Granada, Spain on Spring break in 1955 where she developed an immediate interest in architecture after seeing and visiting the Alhambra. She graduated Phi Beta Kappa from Cornell University in 1956. She went on to study and receive a Masters Degree in architecture and design at the Harvard Graduate School of Design.

== Career ==
She married Marvin Goody, an MIT professor and architect in Boston and joined his firm, becoming a partner in 1968. Joan Goody taught architectural design at Harvard in the 1970s.

== Personal life ==
Joan Edelman married Marvin Goody, a fellow architect, in 1960. She remained married to him until his death in 1980.

In 1984, she married Peter Davison, a poet and editor, and remained married to him until his death in 2004.

== Selected projects ==
- restoration of Trinity Church at Copley Square in Boston, Massachusetts, including the creation of a major gathering area in a former cramped basement
- Harbor Point Apartments, where she transformed a dismal public housing project into a mixed-income neighborhood on the Columbia Point peninsula in the Dorchester neighborhood of Boston, Massachusetts
- a federal courthouse in Wheeling, West Virginia, where she mixed modern with traditional motifs
- Salomon Center for Teaching at Brown University
- Heaton Court, a small, affordable housing cluster in Stockbridge, Massachusetts
- conversion of the former St. Elizabeth's Hospital in Washington, D.C., into a new headquarters for the Department of Homeland Security.

== Publications ==
- New Architecture in Boston, MIT Press; 1965
- "Essays on social housing", Progressive Architecture 7 (1984), pp. 82–87
- "Do you see new directions?", Architecture: the AIA journal 5 (1985), pp. 240–251, 312–320
- Columbia Point: A New Vision (c.1991) Boston Society of Architects, Joan E. Goody, Chair of Committee. In the collection of the Boston Public Library
