= Massachusetts gateway cities =

Group of midsize cities in the U.S. state of Massachusetts

Locations of the eleven original Gateway Cities in relation to the Greater Boston area.

Massachusetts gateway cities are "midsize urban centers that anchor regional economies around the state", facing "stubborn social and economic challenges" while retaining "many assets with unrealized potential." These communities, which all had a legacy of economic success, have struggled as the state's economy shifted toward skills-centered knowledge sectors (increasingly clustered in and around Boston).

== Original cities and the Compact ==
The designation was initially applied to eleven cities named in a 2007 report co-authored by the Brookings Institution and the Massachusetts Institute for a New Commonwealth (MassINC). In May 2008 the chief executives of the eleven Gateway Cities gathered at the Old State House in Boston "to sign a compact to unite their administrations in future efforts aimed at economic and community development," asserting their desire to work cooperatively to address issues of common concern.

The original eleven cities are: Brockton, Fall River, Fitchburg, Haverhill, Holyoke, Lawrence, Lowell, New Bedford, Pittsfield, Springfield, and Worcester.

== Additional cities ==
A legislative definition (Section 3A of Chapter 23A of the General Laws of Massachusetts) put in place in 2009 and amended in 2010 expanded the designation of gateway cities with fifteen more locations, for a total of 26 cities. Under the General Laws, gateway cities have a population between 35,000 and 250,000, with an average household income below the state average, and an average educational attainment rate (bachelor's degree or above) below the state average. Updates to the Census data in 2013 led to the addition of two cities (Attleboro and Peabody) for a total of 26 communities.

These additional cities are: Attleboro, Barnstable, Chelsea, Chicopee, Everett, Leominster, Lynn, Malden, Methuen, Peabody, Quincy, Revere, Salem, Taunton, and Westfield.

== Impact ==
The Gateway Cities Legislative Caucus was founded in 2008 by State Representative Antonio Cabral of New Bedford and State Senator Stephen Buoniconti of Springfield. As House and Senate co-chairs of the Caucus, they were joined by 58 other representatives and 20 other senators who represent Gateway Cities. In 2012, Senator Benjamin Downing of Pittsfield replaced retiring Senator Buoniconti as the Senate chair. In 2017, Senator Eric Lesser of Springfield/Longmeadow replaced retiring Senator Downing as the Senate Chair. When Senator Lesser left the legislature in 2023, he was replaced by Senator John Cronin of Fitchburg.

The Urban Initiative at the University of Massachusetts Dartmouth was launched by Chancellor Jean MacCormack in direct response to the Gateway Cities report.

In October 2012, MassINC launched the Gateway Cities Innovation Institute. In 2021, a report by the Federal Reserve Bank of Boston tracked residents who moved from high-poverty neighborhoods and found that while the majority of gateway city residents moved to lower-poverty neighborhoods, they did so less frequently than residents of high-poverty neighborhoods in the city of Boston or elsewhere in the state of Massachusetts; in the fact, the probability of moving to a lower-poverty neighborhood was significantly lower in the gateway cities (60.8%) than in high- poverty neighborhoods in Boston (69.6%) or high-poverty neighborhoods elsewhere in Massachusetts (77.6%.)
