= Edward M. Kennedy Institute for the United States Senate =

Educational institution and museum in Massachusetts

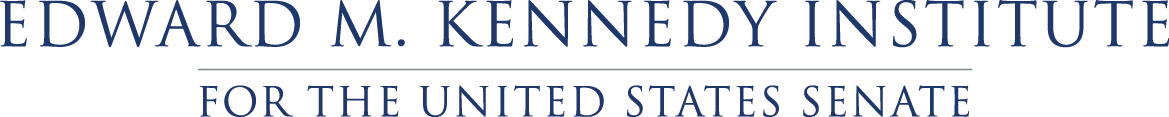

- Location within Massachusetts
- Location: 210 Morrissey Boulevard; Columbia Point; Boston, MA 02125
- Coordinates: 42.314852°N 71.035401°W
- Type: Specialized, Historical, Biographical
- Accreditation: American Alliance of Museums
- Visitors: 62,000 visitors per year (this includes about 16,000 students)
- Founders: Edward M. Kennedy & Victoria Reggie Kennedy
- Architect: Rafael Viñoly
- Public transit access: JFK/UMass station
- Parking: On site (no charge)
- Website: emkinstitute.org

The Edward M. Kennedy Institute for the United States Senate (also known as the Kennedy Institute) is a non-profit civic engagement and educational institution on Columbia Point in the Dorchester neighborhood of Boston, Massachusetts, next to the John F. Kennedy Presidential Library and Museum on the University of Massachusetts Boston campus. Named for long-time U.S. Senator Ted Kennedy, the institute contains a full-scale reproduction of the United States Senate Chamber, a replica of Kennedy's Washington, D.C., office, and digital exhibits. The organization includes the Kennedy Home in Hyannis Port, which was donated to the institute in 2012 as part of a "mission of educating the public about the U.S. government, invigorating public discourse, emphasizing the importance of bipartisanship, and inspiring the next generation of citizens and leaders to engage in the public square." The Kennedy Institute is, along with the Bipartisan Policy Center and the Orrin G. Hatch Foundation, a co-sponsor of The Senate Project, whose goal is, through hosting a series of Oxford-style debates between leading U.S. Senators, to reintroduce the culture of seeking common ground and bipartisan consensus that has been the essence of the Senate since it was conceived in 1789.

== Opening ==
On March 30, 2015, the dedication ceremony for the institute was held with President and First Lady of the United States Barack and Michelle Obama. On the following day, the institute opened to the public.

== Exhibits ==
=== The Senate Chamber ===
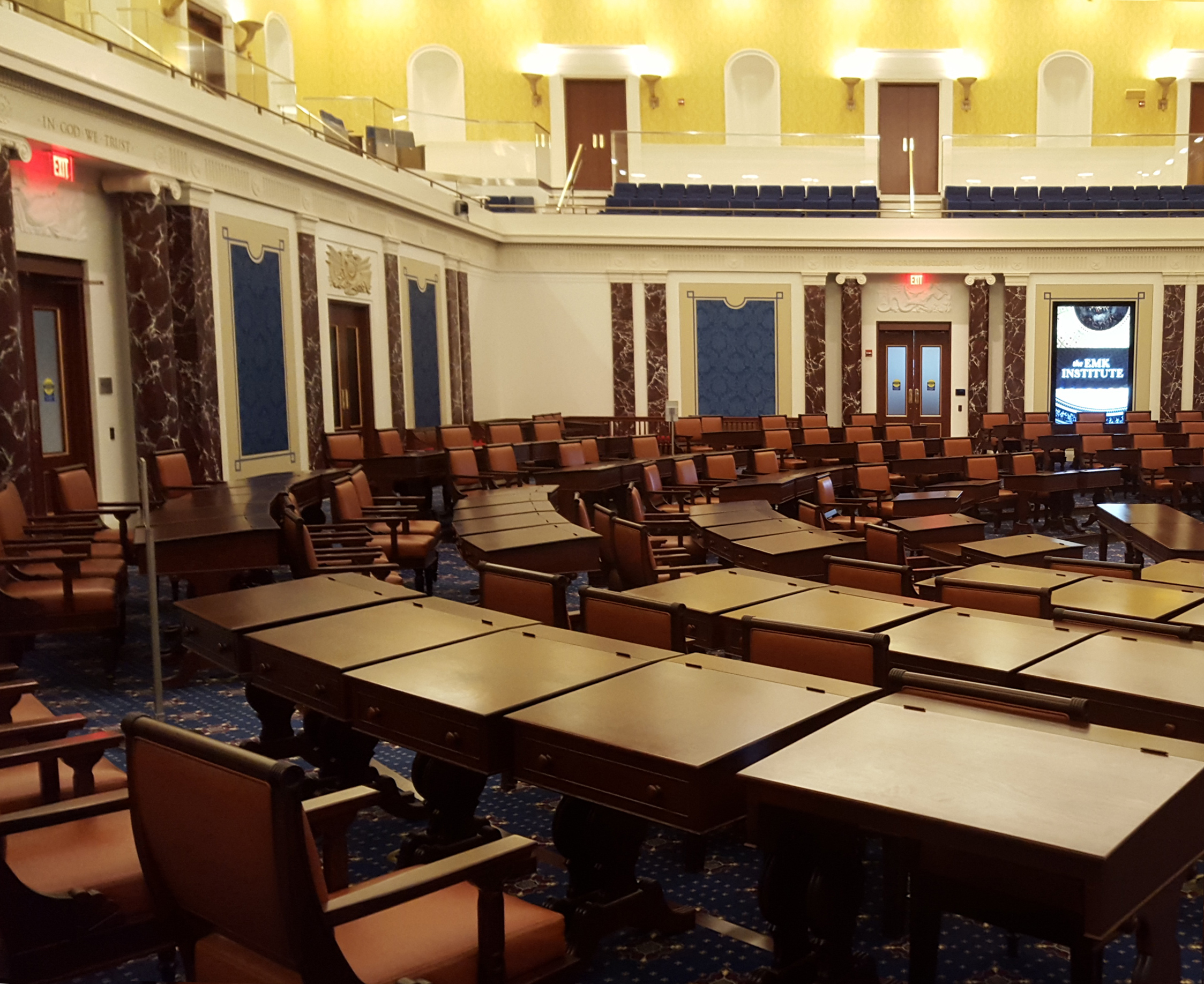
A view of the Edward M. Kennedy Institute's replica Senate Chamber

The building houses the only full-scale reproduction of the United States Senate Chamber.

=== Digital exhibits ===
The exhibit halls feature technology-driven projected displays on the history of the Senate through exhibits such as What is the Senate?, Traditions of the Senate, and People of the Senate.

=== Senator’s Office ===
This exhibit features a full-scale replica of Senator Kennedy's Washington, D.C., office, where visitors, equipped with provided tablets, are able to explore the stories behind pieces of the collection.

== Public programs and special events ==
=== Getting to the Point ===
The Getting to the Point series convenes individuals with diverse perspectives to discuss current issues and the challenges the United States government is facing. Getting to the Point takes on various formats from town halls to keynote lectures and panel discussions, and showcases speakers from all walks of life. Since opening, the institute has hosted speakers such as former Senate Majority Leader Mitch McConnell and late Congressman John Lewis.

=== Across the Aisle ===
This series brings together government leaders with disparate ideologies, from different political parties who are collaborating on a common cause. In moderated discussions, Across the Aisle highlights the type of civil discourse, negotiation, collaboration, and leadership that leads to solutions for pressing problems. The series features members of Congress, governors, mayors, and other elected officials and both national and local issues.

=== Oral History Project ===
The Edward M. Kennedy Oral History Project, created in partnership with the Miller Center of Public Affairs at the University of Virginia, was released in September 2015. The project is a compilation of interviews from current and former members of the Senate, House, administration officials, foreign leaders, Senate staff, issue advocates, journalists, family, and friends documenting Senator Kennedy's service. The institute has hosted a speaker series that draws on this resource to highlight current and future national issues before the U.S. Senate.

== Educational programs ==
The Kennedy Institute offers its online programming at varied times as a way to maximize access to its civic education offerings for students from other states.

== History ==
=== Construction, dedication, and opening ===
A groundbreaking ceremony was held on April 8, 2011. The institute was dedicated by President Barack Obama on March 30, 2015, with Vice President Joe Biden and First Lady Michelle Obama in attendance. The institute opened to the public on March 31, 2015. The institute's concept, design, and production are the result of a collaboration between Senator Edward M. Kennedy, his wife Vicki Reggie Kennedy, and Ed Schlossberg of ESI Design. During the production process, Control Group was brought on for software development, Richard Lewis Media Group for media elements, Electrosonic for projection technology, and Gigantic Mechanic for game mechanics.

=== Leadership ===
Adam G. Hinds, a former Massachusetts state senator and formor United Nations negotiator based in the Middle East, became CEO of the Kennedy Institute in September 2022.

The institute was previously led by Dr. Jean F. MacCormack from 2014 to 2017, Andrew Tarsy from 2012 to 2014, and Peter Meade from 2009 to 2012. It was announced on November 4, 2019, "with mixed emotions" that the institute's president, Mary K. Grant, Ph.D., who only assumed leadership in 2018 would be leaving within the month.

=== Kennedy Cape House ===
In 2012, the Kennedy family donated the main house of the historic Kennedy Compound in Hyannis Port to the institute fulfilling a promise made by Senator Kennedy to his mother, Rose, to donate the house for charitable use.
