= Carol C. Amick =

American politician

Carol Campbell Amick
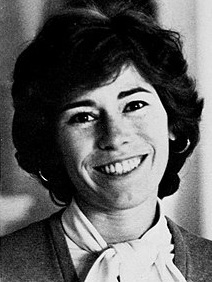
- Amick in 1983

Member of the Massachusetts House of Representatives from the 5th Middlesex district
- In office 1975–1977

Member of the Massachusetts Senate
- In office 1977–1989
- Preceded by: Ronald MacKenzie
- Succeeded by: Lucile P. Hicks

Personal details
- Education: Iowa State University (BS); Harvard University (MPA)

Carol Campbell Amick is an American Democratic politician from Bedford, Massachusetts. She represented the 5th Middlesex district in the Massachusetts House of Representatives from 1975 to 1977 and served in the Massachusetts Senate from 1977 to 1989.
