= Margaret Jane Spear =

American politician

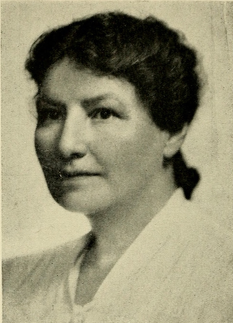

Member of the Massachusetts House of Representatives from the 5th Middlesex district district
- In office 1941–1950

Margaret Jane Spear was an American Democratic politician from Newton, Massachusetts. She represented the 5th Middlesex district in the Massachusetts House of Representatives from 1941 to 1950.

== See also ==
- 1941-1942 Massachusetts legislature
- 1943-1944 Massachusetts legislature
- 1945-1946 Massachusetts legislature
- 1947-1948 Massachusetts legislature
- 1949-1950 Massachusetts legislature
