= Jean F. MacCormack =

Chancellor of University of Massachusetts Dartmouth
- In office 1999-2001 (Interim); 2001 – 2012

Personal details
- Born: 1947 (age 78–79)

Jean F. MacCormack is the past president of the Edward M. Kennedy Institute for the United States Senate, serving in the role from 2014 to 2017. MacCormack is the former Chancellor of University of Massachusetts Dartmouth, where she led from 1999 to 2012.

== Biography ==
MacCormack was born in 1947 and grew up in Dorchester, Massachusetts. MacCormack obtained a bachelor's degree in literature and fine arts from Emmanuel College in 1969, afterwards going on to earn a doctorate in education from UMass Amherst, which she completed in 1979.

== Career ==
After receiving her doctorate, MacCormack became a UMass Boston faculty member. MacCormack served as Vice Chancellor of Administration and Finance at UMass Boston for 11 years, beginning in 1988. By 1996, she became the Deputy Chancellor at UMass Boston, and in 1995 she served as interim chancellor. While at UMass Boston, MacCormack also held the position of Director of the Institute for Learning and Teaching, developed a K-12 community outreach program, created a science teacher learning program, and served as Acting Dean of the Graduate College of Education while the school merged with Boston State College.

MacCormack was named Interim Chancellor of UMass Dartmouth on September 1, 1999. On February 7, 2001, she was named as Chancellor. She retired from the role in early 2012.

Under MacCormack’s direction, UMass Dartmouth grew enrollment from 6,900 to 9,400, and annual private support from $3.9 million to $16 million. Available student housing was nearly doubled, permitting the university to offer 4,500 beds to residential students. MacCormack also emphasized research and fresh faculty. During her tenure, UMass Dartmouth hired over 150 new faculty members and nearly tripled research funding from $7 million to $26 million. MacCormack also advanced the school's investment in local communities via opening major satellite sites including the Advanced Technology Manufacturing Center in Fall River and the College of Visual and Performing Arts center in New Bedford, and partnering with institutions like the Ocean Explorium in New Bedford.

From 2014 through 2017, MacCormack served as the president of the Edward M. Kennedy Institute for the United States Senate, a cultural and educational institution located in Dorchester, MA.
