= D Street Projects =

Public housing in Boston, Massachusetts

Coordinates: 42°20′18″N 71°03′15″W

The D Street Projects, built in 1949 as the West Broadway Housing Development, are a housing project located in South Boston, Massachusetts. The D Street projects stretch 4 city blocks from West Broadway to West Seventh street and 3 city blocks from B street to D street, forming a perfect square.

The land for the West Broadway Housing Development was cleared in 1941, and the project opened in 1949 with 972 units intended for white veteran families only. In 1962, upon receipt of a lawsuit filed by a civil rights group, the Boston city government under Mayor John F. Collins (1960–1968) desegregated the project. It was the first state development under Chapter 200 of the Massachusetts legislature's Acts and Resolves of 1948 to open and the only one built on a slum clearance site, having originally been planned as a privately financed project in 1934.

It was one of the Boston projects which remained predominantly white well into the 1990s, despite a largely non-white waiting list for public housing. By the early 1980s Lewis "Harry" Spence was appointed receiver of the Boston Housing Authority, was chosen as one of the three demonstration projects for renovations. The plan, which won urban design awards, involved breaking up the 27-acre (11-hectare) development into seven "villages" containing 675 apartments, reintroducing the street grid and replacing the original landscaping with courtyard spaces, and transforming the architecture by adding design elements such as pitched roofs, at a total estimated cost of over $60 million. Although the project is in a rough neighborhood, South Boston was rapidly gentrifying, and in 2000 the remaining quarter of the housing was instead turned over to redevelopment for mixed-income housing and businesses.
