= Certified paralegal =

A certified paralegal or certified legal assistant is the title of paralegals in the United States who have met certain education and work experience requirements and have passed one of a number of available certification exams. The primary function of paralegals is to assist attorneys in the delivery of legal services. According to the American Bar Association: "A legal assistant or paralegal is a person, qualified by education, training and/or work experience who is employed or retained by a lawyer, law office, corporation, governmental agency or other entity and who performs specifically delegated substantive legal work for which a lawyer is responsible." Because certification programs are voluntary in most states, a paralegal may find work in the field without obtaining certification. Additionally, requirements for certification may vary by state.

== American Bar Association definition of legal assistant/paralegal ==
In the United States, "paralegal" and "legal assistant" are frequently used interchangeably. At the August 1997 ABA Annual Meeting, the ABA's policymaking body, the House of Delegates, adopted the current definition of "legal assistant/paralegal", as recommended by the Standing Committee on Legal Assistants. The current definition reads as follows: A legal assistant or paralegal is a person, qualified by education, training or work experience who is employed or retained by a lawyer, law office, corporation, governmental agency or other entity and who performs specifically delegated substantive legal work for which a lawyer is responsible.

The current definition of "legal assistant/paralegal" replaces the definition adopted by the ABA Board of Governors in 1986. It adds the term "paralegal" since the terms "legal assistant" and "paralegal" are, in practice, used interchangeably. The term that is preferred generally depends on what part of the country one is from. The current definition streamlines the 1986 definition and more accurately reflects how legal assistants are presently being utilized in the delivery of legal services.

Despite the American Bar Association's position on this matter, there is no consensus in the legal field as a whole regarding the specific duties of paralegals/legal assistants, and some law firms and legal departments still maintain paralegal and legal assistant as separate job titles.

== Certified Paralegals vs. Certificated Paralegals ==
According to the American Bar Association, there is a distinction between "certified" paralegals and "certificated" paralegals, and the terms are not interchangeable. Certified Paralegals have passed a professional exam, and certificated paralegals have completed a paralegal program or other preparatory education through an academic institution. Certificated paralegals are generally eligible to take one of several certification exams after graduating from an approved paralegal program.

Occasionally, paralegals mistakenly refer to themselves as an "ABA Certified Paralegal" in reference to the certificate that they were given upon completion of paralegal school. This is entirely different from certification. A certificate from paralegal school is a Certificate of Completion. The paralegal school these paralegals attended has been approved by the ABA. Out of approximately 1500 paralegal schools in the U.S., only about 280 have been approved by the ABA. The school must meet certain qualifications set down by the ABA and pay upfront and annual fees to maintain its approval status. When a student completes the 4-month, 2-year or 4-year program, they are given a "certificate of completion" but are not "certified".

== Sources of national and state-specific paralegal certifications (United States) ==
=== Certification by the National Association of Legal Assistants ===
CP or CLA is the post-nominal credential in the United States earned by paralegals who have passed the Certified Paralegal Exam and have met up education and experience requirements for certification as a CP or CLA. The CP and CLA credential is recognized by the American Bar Association and State Bars.

To become a CP in the United States, the candidate voluntarily passes the Certified Paralegal Exam (CP Exam). The Certified Paralegal program - the oldest in the United States - was established in 1976 and is administered by the National Association of Legal Assistants (NALA). The CP designation is a certification duly registered with the U.S. Patent and Trademark Office (No. 78213275)

The term "certified paralegal" is not owned by NALA or any other organization (just as the term "Certified Public Account" is not owned by the various organizations that offer accountant certification). The term is not proprietary to NALA, only the certification mark is (image and mark information is available via the U.S. Patent Office: Trademark Search and via NALA).

According to Legal Assistant Today magazine, the CP Exam has a 45-50% pass rate.

After a paralegal obtains the CP credential, he or she is eligible to participate in the Advanced Paralegal Certification program. The credential awarded after successful completion of the program is the "ACP" credential. A CP must complete an ACP course and pass an exam which demonstrates advanced knowledge in the specific practice area or areas of practice in which the course is taken

=== Certification by the National Federation of Paralegal Associations ===
The National Federation of Paralegal Associations, or NFPA, offers two certification programs. Their Paralegal Advanced Competency Exam (PACE) was established in 1996. Their Paralegal CORE Competency Exam (PCCE) was established in 2011. A paralegal who completes the certification process through the NFPA earns the credential Registered Paralegal (RP) for completion of the PACE Exam and Core Registered Paralegal (CRP) for completion of the PCCE Exam. The Paralegal CORE Competency Exam (PCCE) was developed to assess the knowledge, skills and ability of early-career and entry-level paralegals. The PACE exam consists of hypothetical questions testing advanced application of general knowledge, paralegal experience, and critical analysis obtained only by a higher level of education and actual work experience. The RP and CRP credentials are recognized by the American Bar Association and State Bars.

=== Certification by NALS, The Association for Legal Professionals (formerly National Association of Legal Secretaries) ===
The Association for Legal Professionals, or NALS, previously the National Association of Legal Secretaries, offers the Professional Paralegal Exam, which was established in 2004. A paralegal who completes the certification process through NALS earns the credential Professional Paralegal (PP). The PP credential is recognized by the American Bar Association and State Bars and requires 900 clock hours to take the test.

=== Certification by the American Alliance of Paralegals ===
The American Alliance of Paralegals (AAPI) awards the designation American Alliance Certified Paralegal (AACP). The AACP credential is recognized by the American Bar Association and State Bars.

=== State specific certifications ===
The American Bar Association recognizes the national certification set forth above and the voluntary state-specific certifications of the:

- Florida Bar
- North Carolina State Bar
- Ohio State Bar Association
- South Carolina Bar
- Texas Board of Legal Specialization

Although California does not certify paralegals in general, California legislation (AB 1761) makes it unlawful for persons to identify themselves as paralegals unless they meet certain requirements. Paralegals must also complete continuing legal education every two years in order to lawfully perform services or identify as a paralegal.

== Ethics ==
All certifying bodies require applicants to complete a special examination containing ethics to become certified. Most exams require the knowledge of the American Bar Association's Model Rules of Professional Conduct. NALA also has its own Code of Ethics and Professional Responsibility.

== Continuing Legal Education (CLE) ==
Just like attorneys, all certifying bodies require applicants to take continuing legal education courses in order to renew their certification. Credentials may be revoked from certified paralegals who fail to meet the recertification requirements. The paralegal must then retake the certifying exam again to use the credential.
