= Ronald MacKenzie =

American attorney and politician (1934–2020)

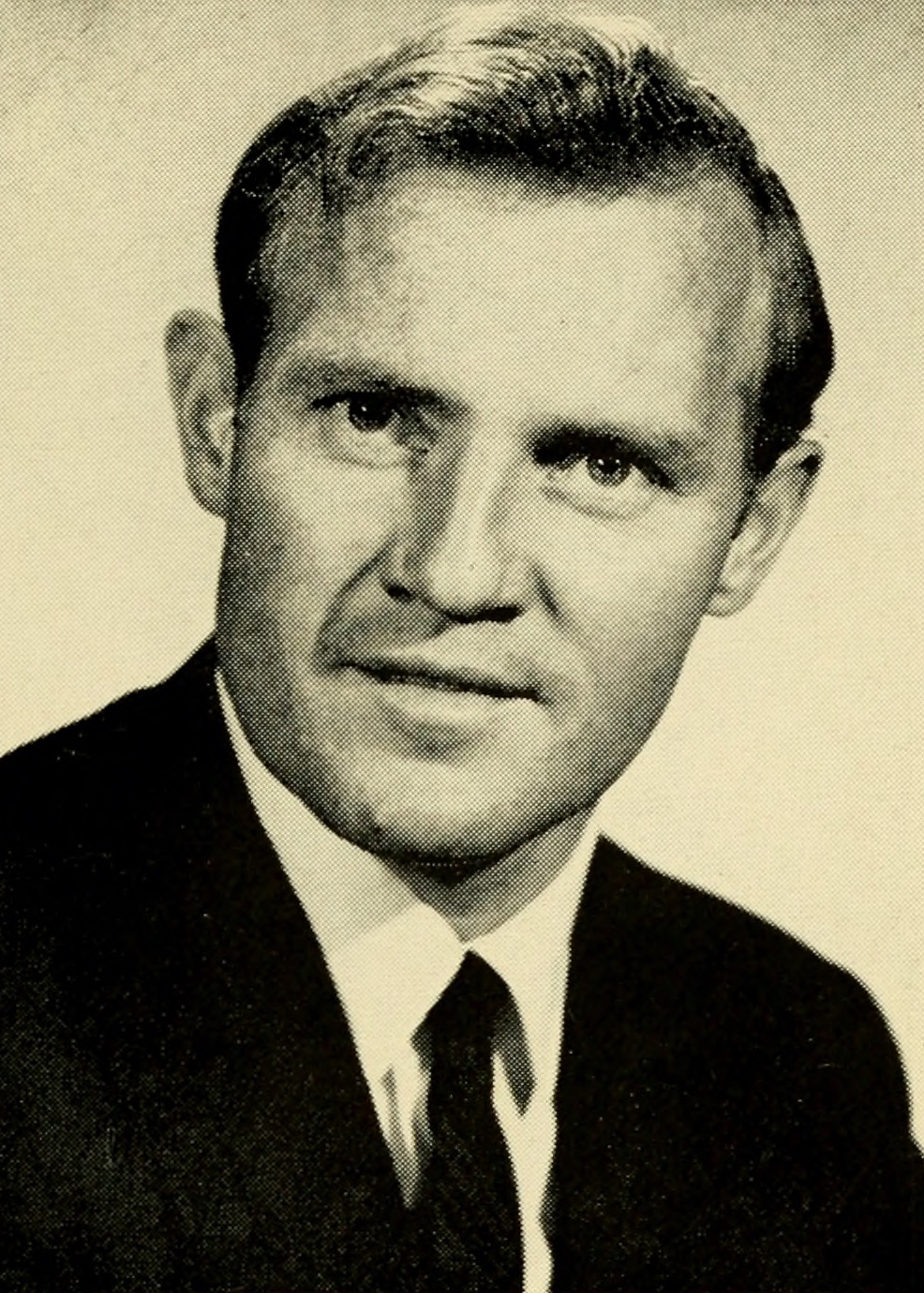

Member of the Massachusetts Senate
- In office 1967–1977
- Preceded by: James J. Long
- Succeeded by: Carol C. Amick

Personal details
- Born: May 3, 1934 Waltham, Massachusetts, U.S.
- Died: October 29, 2020 (aged 86)
- Party: Republican
- Education: Dartmouth College B.A.; Boston University M.Ed.
- Occupation: Insurance salesman, legislator, Director of Veterans' Services, attorney

Ronald Conrad MacKenzie (May 3, 1934 – October 29, 2020) was an American attorney and Republican politician who served in the Massachusetts Senate from 1967 to 1977. He resigned following his conviction for extortion, conspiracy, and other related offenses.

== Early life and education ==
MacKenzie was born on May 3, 1934, in Waltham, Massachusetts. He graduated from Winchester High School and went on to earn a Bachelor of Arts in Economics from Dartmouth College in 1956. He served as First Lieutenant in the United States Army. Prior to becoming a legislator, MacKenzie sold insurance. In 1976, MacKenzie graduated from Suffolk University Law School.

== Political career ==
=== Beginnings ===
In 1963 MacKenzie served as chairman of a signature drive for an initiative petition drive to weaken the power of the Massachusetts Governor's Council. The drive was successful and the question appeared on the ballot in 1964. It failed, 1,059,352 votes to 625,194.

In 1964, MacKenzie challenged incumbent Democratic state senator James J. Long in the 7th Middlesex District. He lost 53% to 47%. In 1966, MacKenzie challenged Long again. This time, MacKenzie won with 55% of the vote. In the 1970 election, MacKenzie defeated future Nashville, Tennessee, mayor and Governor of Tennessee Phil Bredesen.

=== Proposed legislation ===
In 1969, MacKenzie and Representative John Mella sponsored a plan to expand Fenway Park. Their bill would have granted the Boston Redevelopment Authority the power to purchase land outside Fenway Park and sell it to a private developer. The park's capacity would have been raised to 50,000 by knocking out the Green Monster and installing double-decker bleachers throughout the park. In addition to housing the Boston Red Sox, the expanded stadium would have been home to the Boston Patriots. In November of that year, MacKenzie filed legislation to select a 4,000 acre (1,600 ha) site for the construction of a planned community that could house 250,000 people. Also in 1969, MacKenzie filed a bill that would make possession of marijuana a misdemeanor rather than a felony.

=== Leadership positions ===
From 1971 to 1977, MacKenzie served as Assistant Minority Floor Leader. In 1972 he chaired a special legislative committee that studied the effect salting roads had on water sources. The committee recommended that the Department of Health control the storage of de-icing materials and ban their use if water sources become endangered. It also recommended that all levels of government be required to report how much salt they use.

=== MBM scandal ===
On August 13, 1976, a grand jury indicted MacKenzie and fellow Senator Joseph DiCarlo on charges that they extorted $40,000 from a consulting company. According to the indictment, MacKenzie and DiCarlo threatened McKee-Berger-Mansueto, Inc. (MBM), the consulting company supervising construction of the University of Massachusetts Boston campus at Columbia Point, with an unfavorable report from the legislative committee investigating their contract unless they were paid. MacKenzie and DiCarlo were charged with violating the Hobbs Act, which forbids extortion by public officials, and the Travel Act, which forbids crossing state lines for the purpose of extortion. On February 25, 1977, they were found guilty of all charges. MacKenzie was sentenced to one year in prison and fined $5,000.

Three days after his conviction for extortion, on February 28, MacKenzie resigned as Assistant Minority Floor Leader. However, he refused to resign his Senate seat. The conduct of MacKenzie and DiCarlo was referred to the newly formed Senate Ethics Committee, and on March 31, 1977, the day before the committee was to issue its report, MacKenzie resigned from the Senate.

== Post-political career ==
MacKenzie served ten months at the Federal Correctional Institution in Allenwood. After his release in October 1978 he did paralegal work in the offices of attorney Richard M. Riley and State Senator Michael LoPresti Jr. On August 19, 1981, the Burlington Board of Selectmen voted 3 to 2 to make MacKenzie the town's Director of Veterans' Services. In December 1983 the Massachusetts Board of Bar Examiners ruled that MacKenzie was eligible to be a lawyer in spite of his conviction. He went on to pass the bar and practice law part-time. On June 24, 1991, the Board of Selectmen voted 3 to 2 against Mackenzie's reappointment as Director of Veterans' Services on the grounds that they did not want him to practice law while serving as the town's veterans' agent. MacKenzie operated a law practice in Burlington. MacKenzie died on October 29, 2020.
