= Lenox Street Projects =

Public housing in Boston, Massachusetts

Lenox Street Housing Projects
- Interactive map of Lenox Street Housing Projects

General information
- Location: 136 Lenox Street, Boston, MA 02118. Boston, Massachusetts, United States
- Coordinates: 42.3363°N 71.0816°W

Construction
- Constructed: 1939–40

Other information
- Governing body: Boston Housing Authority

Lenox Street Projects is a low-income housing project in the Lower Roxbury section of Boston, Massachusetts. The 376-unit three-story brick buildings were built in 1939 and was the first housing project in Boston that African American families were able to move into. Originally, the buildings were restricted to only Black residents; in the 1960s, the NAACP challenged this policy, and the building was desegregated in the 1980s. In 2016, The Boston Globe described is as "part relic, part fortress", the site of frequent violence and drug dealing after neglect left the buildings in disrepair. That year, a major renovation effort was announced, which was completed in 2024.
