= Massachusetts House of Representatives' 5th Middlesex district =

American legislative district

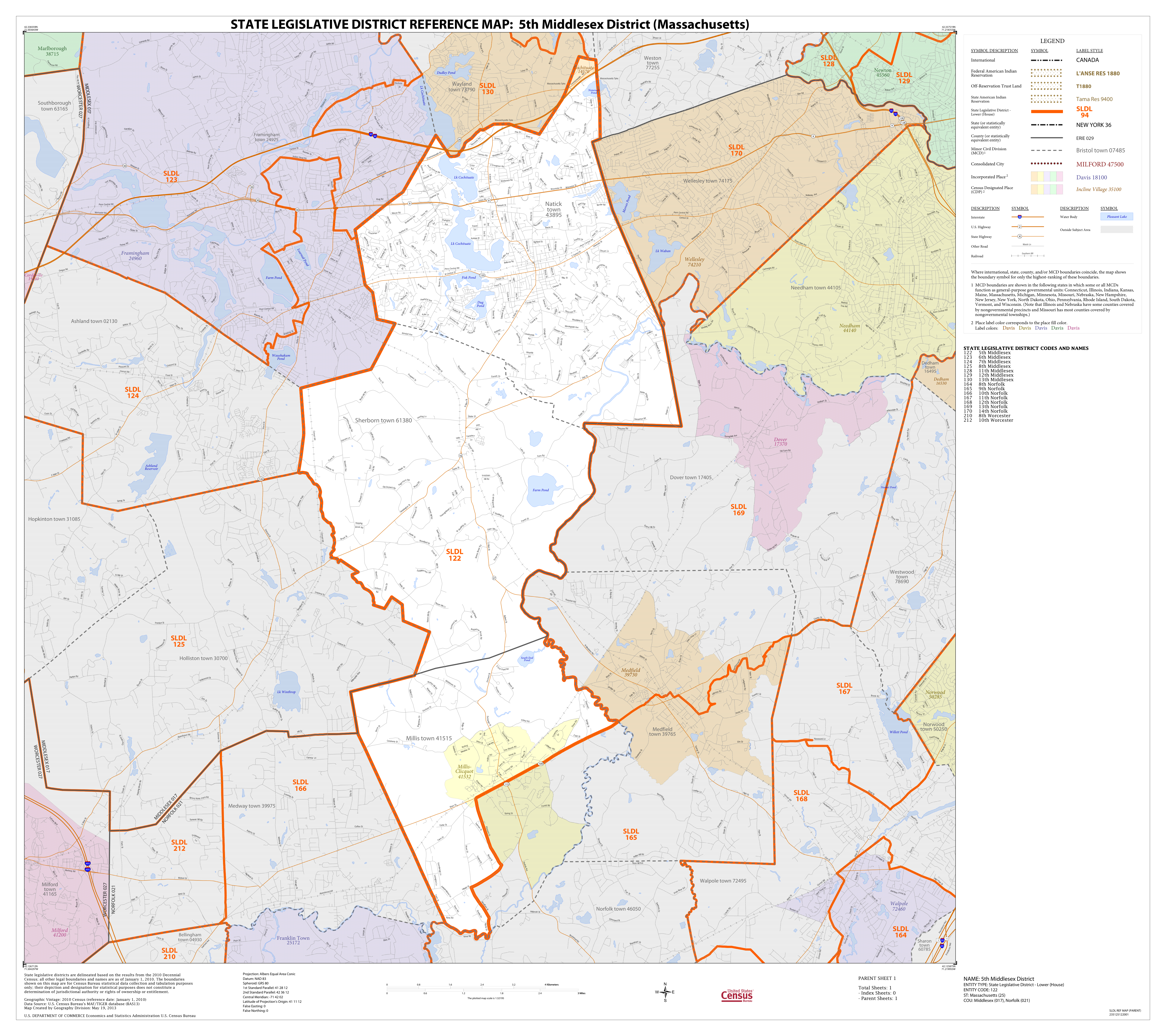
Map of Massachusetts House of Representatives' 5th Middlesex district, based on the 2010 United States census.

Massachusetts House of Representatives' 5th Middlesex district in the United States is one of 160 legislative districts included in the lower house of the Massachusetts General Court. It covers parts of Middlesex County and Norfolk County. Democrat David Linsky of Natick has represented the district since 1999. Candidates running for this district seat in the 2020 Massachusetts general election include Jaymin Patel.

== Towns represented ==
The district includes the following localities:

- part of Millis
- Natick
- Sherborn

The current district geographic boundary overlaps with those of the Massachusetts Senate's 2nd Middlesex and Norfolk district and Norfolk, Bristol and Middlesex district.

=== Former locale ===
The district previously covered Medford, circa 1872.

== Representatives ==
- Oliver Holman, circa 1858
- Elisha Hayden, circa 1859
- Samuel Cutler, circa 1888
- Albert W. Bullock, circa 1920
- George G. Moyse, circa 1920
- Leverett Saltonstall, circa 1929
- Margaret Jane Spear, 1941–1950
- Irene K. Thresher, 1951–1961
- Howard Whitmore, Jr., circa 1951
- William Anthony Pickett, circa 1975
- Paula Lewellen, 1977–1978
- Lou Nickinello, circa 1982
- Joseph M. Connolly, 1983–1991
- Douglas Stoddart, 1991–1999
- David Paul Linsky, 1999–current

== See also ==
- List of Massachusetts House of Representatives elections
- Other Middlesex County districts of the Massachusetts House of Representatives: 1st, 2nd, 3rd, 4th, 6th, 7th, 8th, 9th, 10th, 11th, 12th, 13th, 14th, 15th, 16th, 17th, 18th, 19th, 20th, 21st, 22nd, 23rd, 24th, 25th, 26th, 27th, 28th, 29th, 30th, 31st, 32nd, 33rd, 34th, 35th, 36th, 37th
- List of Massachusetts General Courts
- List of former districts of the Massachusetts House of Representatives

== Images ==
Portraits of legislators

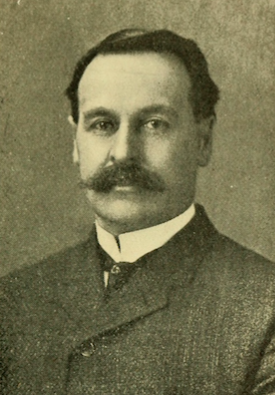
Frank Barnes

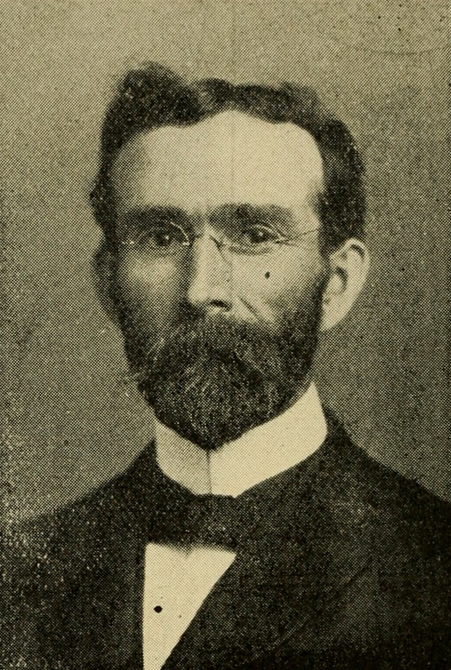
Patrick Duane

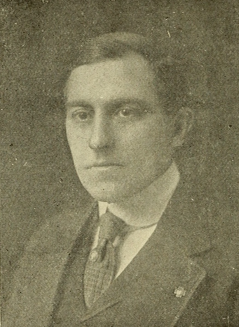
John Gibbs

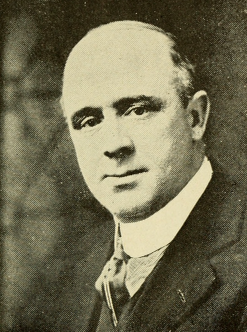
John Hudson

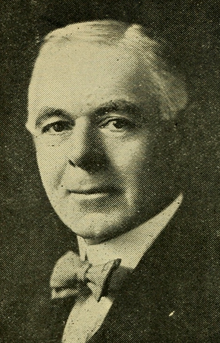
Albert Bullock

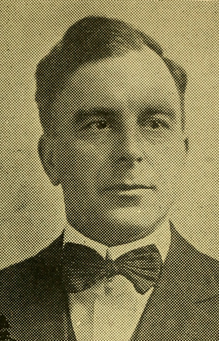
George Moyse

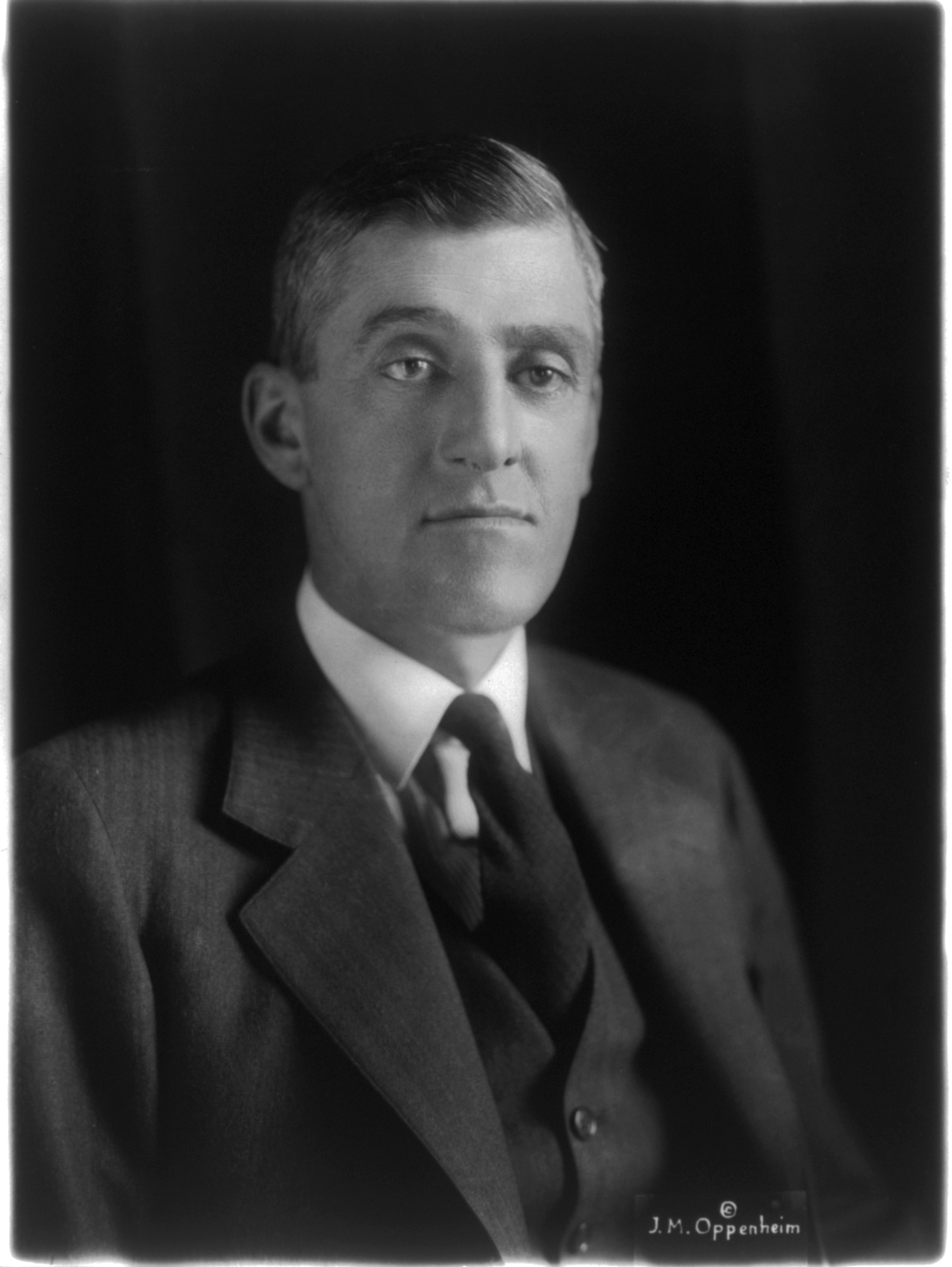
Leverett Saltonstall

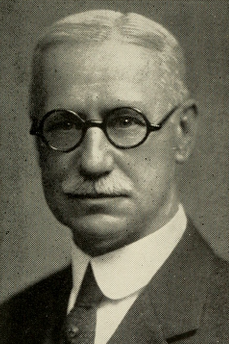
Clarence Luitwieler

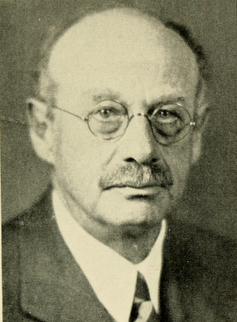
Henderson Inches

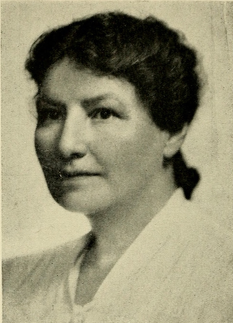
Margaret Jane Spear

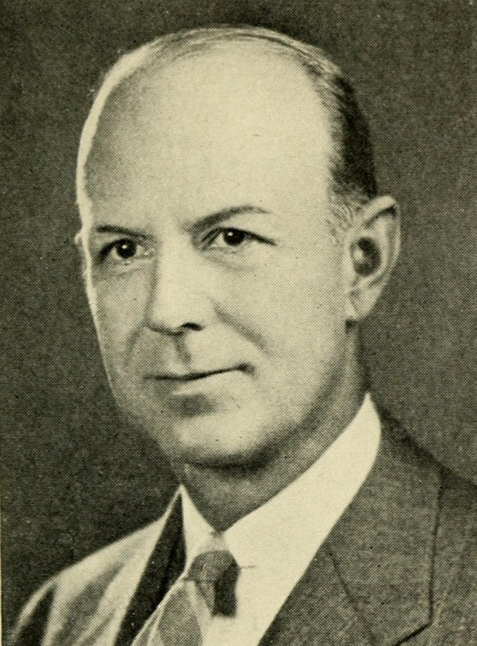
Howard Whitmore

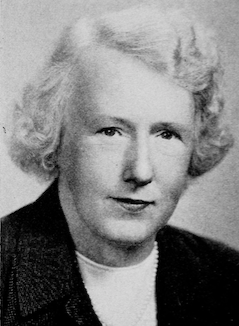
Irene Thresher

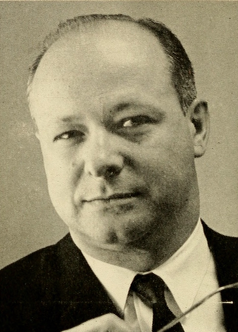
Irving Fishman

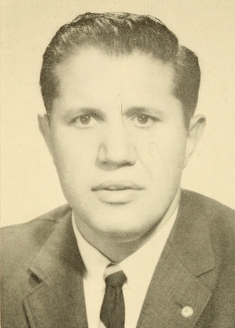
Theodore Mann

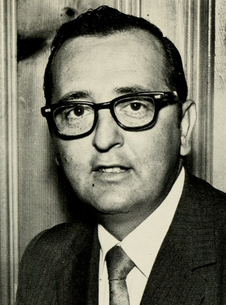
William Pickett

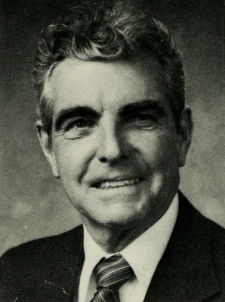
Joseph Connolly

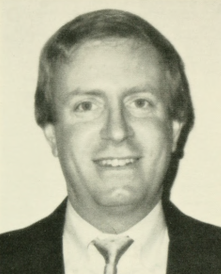
Douglas Stoddart

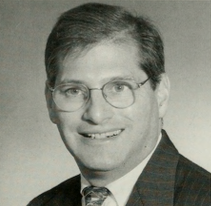
David Linsky
