= Joseph DiCarlo =

American politician (1936–2020)

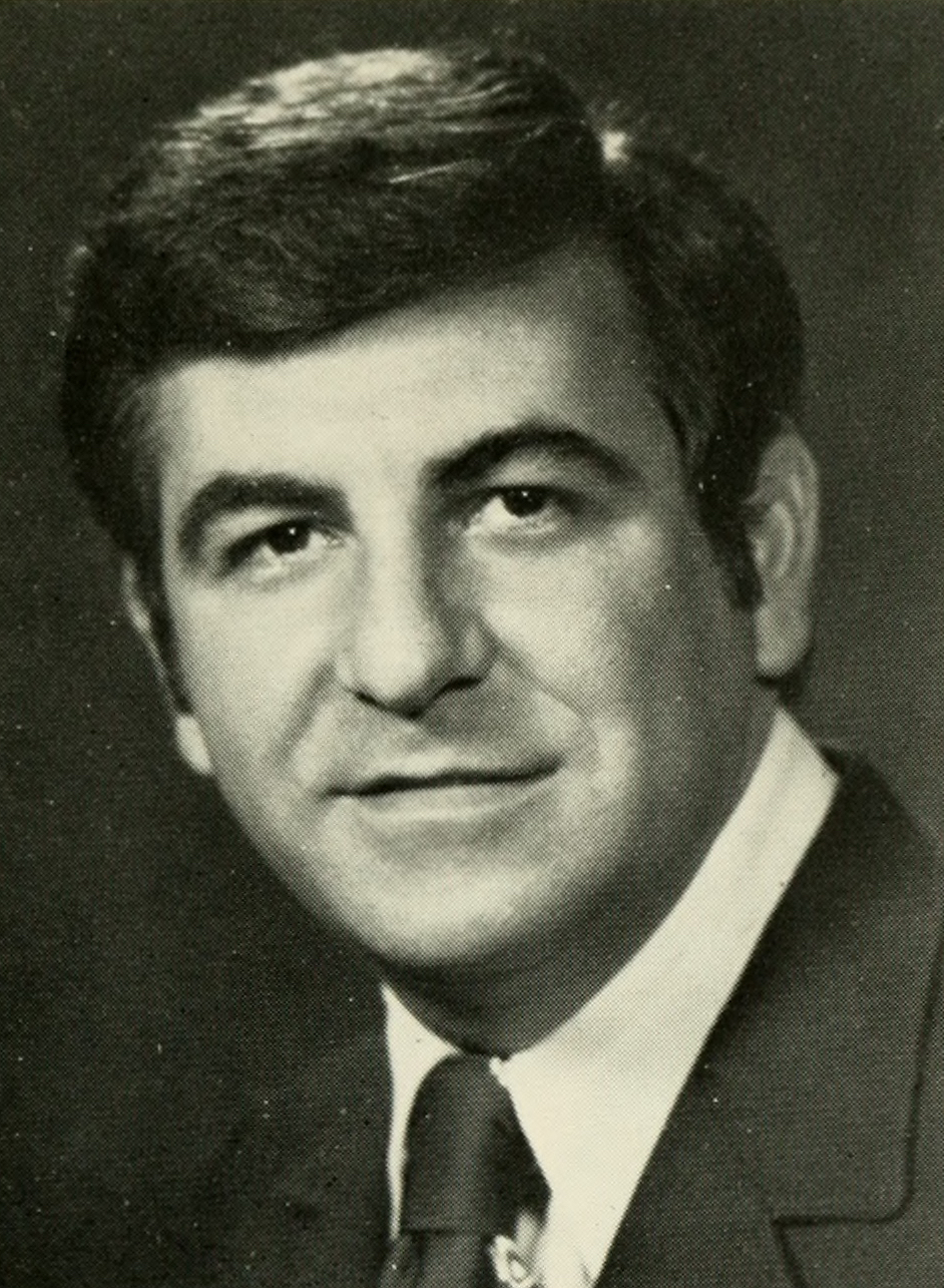
- Joseph DiCarlo, circa 1975

Member of the Massachusetts Senate
- In office 1969–1977
- Preceded by: Harry Della Russo
- Succeeded by: Frank J. Mastrocola, Jr.

Member of the Massachusetts House of Representatives from the 18th Suffolk district
- In office 1965–1969
- Preceded by: Joseph Del Grosso
- Succeeded by: ^{1}

Personal details
- Born: March 21, 1936 Somerville, Massachusetts
- Died: October 22, 2020 (aged 84)
- Resting place: Woodlawn Cemetery; Everett, Massachusetts
- Party: Democratic
- Education: Boston College B.A. Boston University M.Ed.
- Occupation: Teacher; Politician; Construction worker

Joseph J. C. DiCarlo (March 21, 1936 – October 22, 2020) was an American politician who served in both houses of the Massachusetts General Court. He was expelled from the Senate in 1977 after he was convicted of extortion. He is the first Massachusetts State Senator to be expelled.

== Early life ==
DiCarlo was born on March 21, 1936, in Somerville, Massachusetts. He grew up in Revere, Massachusetts, and graduated from Immaculate Conception High School, Boston College, and Boston University. Prior to entering politics, DiCarlo was a junior high school history teacher in Revere.

== Political career ==
In 1964, DiCarlo was elected to the Massachusetts House of Representatives. During his first term he was named chairman of the education committee. In 1968 DiCarlo challenged incumbent State Senator Harry Della Russo in the 1st Suffolk District (later known as the Suffolk, Essex, and Middlesex District), which consisted of Revere, Winthrop, Saugus, and Everett. He upset Della Russo in the Democratic primary and went on to win the general election.

From 1971 to 1973 DiCarlo was the Assistant Majority Leader. In this role he gained a reputation as being fiercely loyal to Senate President Kevin B. Harrington. In 1973 Harrington promoted DiCarlo to Senate Majority Leader, which made him the second ranking person in the Senate. DiCarlo was seen as Harrington's protégée and eventual successor.

At the 1970 state Democratic Convention, DiCarlo was considered a possible compromise candidate for Lieutenant Governor if the convention was deadlocked. However, there was no deadlock and the nomination was won by Michael Dukakis.

=== MBM scandal and expulsion ===
On August 13, 1976, a grand jury indicted DiCarlo and fellow Senator Ronald MacKenzie on charges that they extorted $40,000 from a consulting company. According to the indictment, DiCarlo and Mackenzie threatened McKee-Berger-Mansueto, Inc. (MBM), the consulting company supervising construction of the University of Massachusetts Boston campus at Columbia Point, with an unfavorable report from the legislative committee investigating their contract unless they were paid. DiCarlo and Mackenzie were charged with violating the Hobbs Act, which forbids extortion by public officials, and the Travel Act, which forbids crossing state lines for the purpose of extortion. On February 25, 1977, DiCarlo and Mackenzie were found guilty after a 23-day trial. He was sentenced to one year in prison and fined $5,000.

On February 28, DiCarlo resigned as Majority Leader. He was succeeded by William M. Bulger. Despite his conviction, DiCarlo maintained his innocence and refused to resign his Senate seat. On April 1, the Senate Ethics Committee recommended that DiCarlo be expelled from the Senate. On April 4 the Senate voted 28 to 8 to expel DiCarlo. It was the first time in the Senate's 196-year history that a member had been expelled. After his expulsion, DiCarlo announced that he would run in the special election to regain his seat. He lost the Democratic primary to Frank J. Mastrocola, Jr., a 24-year-old one-term Alderman from Everett who ran on the slogan "If DiCarlo Wins, Massachusetts Loses".

== Post-political life ==
DiCarlo served nine months at the Federal Correctional Institution in Allenwood. After his release from prison, DiCarlo was unable to find employment for six months. Rather than work at his family's North End furniture store, he eventually accepted a job with a Revere construction company. He started out hauling wheelbarrows of cement, but was later moved to doing estimates.

On April 7, 1980, DiCarlo testified before the Special Commission Concerning State and County Buildings (also known as the Ward Commission after its chairman, John William Ward). He admitted to accepting $11,500 from MacKenzie in exchange for altering the report on MBM.

DiCarlo died on October 22, 2020, of cancer.

== Notes ==
1. The district (renamed the 17th Suffolk District in 1969) sent two representatives to the House at this time. DiCarlo and Raymond Edward Carey were succeeded by William Reinstein and Joseph Del Grosso.

Political offices
Preceded by Mario Umana	Majority Leader of the Massachusetts Senate; 1973–1977	Succeeded by William M. Bulger
