= Columbia Point, Boston =

Neighborhood in Boston, Massachusetts, US

Coordinates: 42°18′49.39″N 71°02′00.37″W

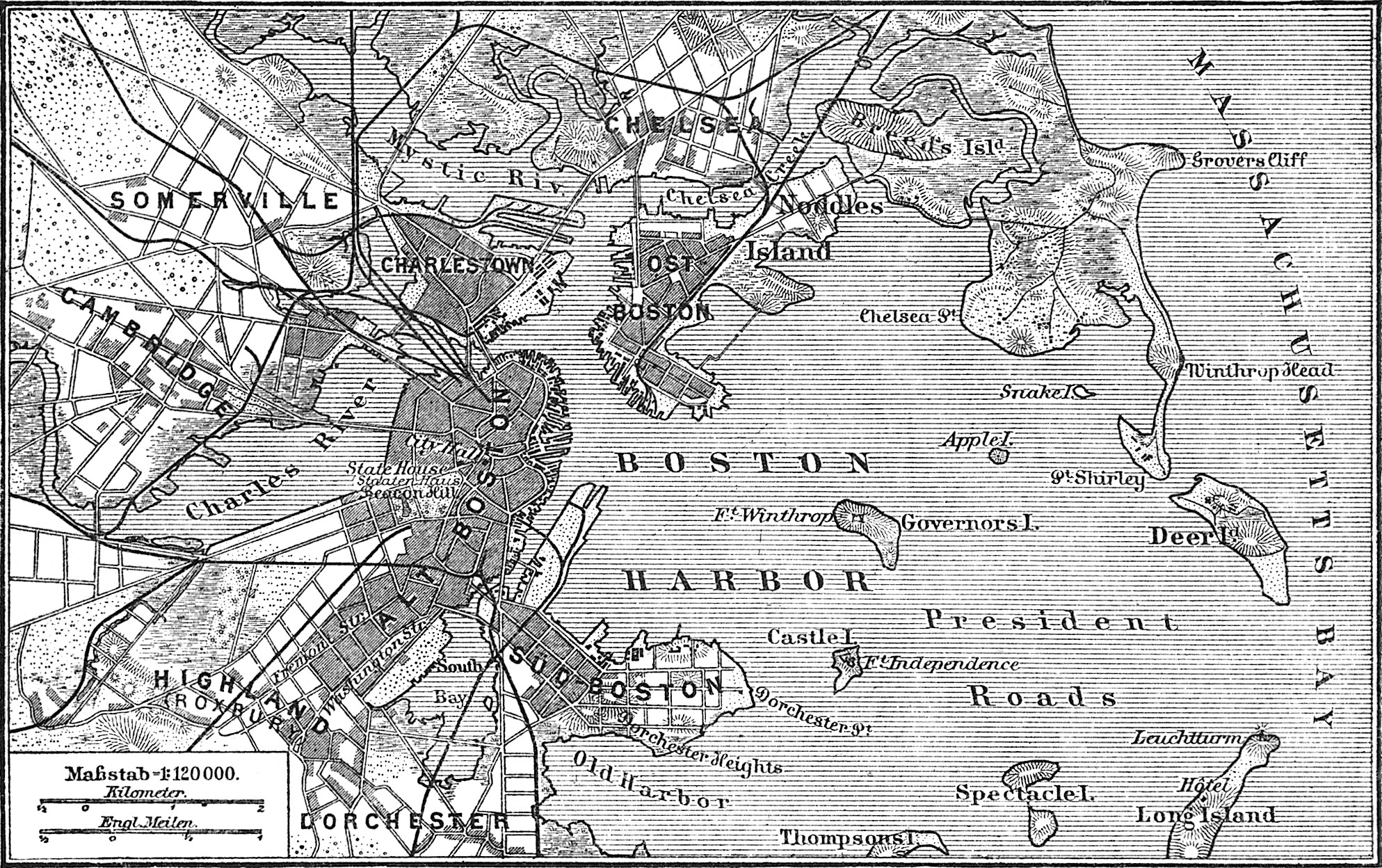
1890 German map of Boston Harbor showing Dorchester in the lower left hand corner.

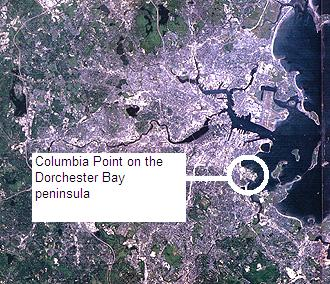
Landsat image of Boston showing Columbia Point peninsula.

Columbia Point, in the Dorchester neighborhood of Boston, Massachusetts, sits on a peninsula jutting out from the mainland of eastern Dorchester into the bay. Old Harbor Park is on the north side, adjacent to Old Harbor, part of Dorchester Bay. The peninsula is primarily occupied by Harbor Point, the University of Massachusetts Boston, the John F. Kennedy Presidential Library and Museum, the Edward M. Kennedy Institute for the United States Senate, and a complex at the former Bayside Expo Center, Boston College High School, and the Massachusetts Archives. The Boston Harborwalk follows the entire coastline.

== History ==
=== 17th–19th centuries ===
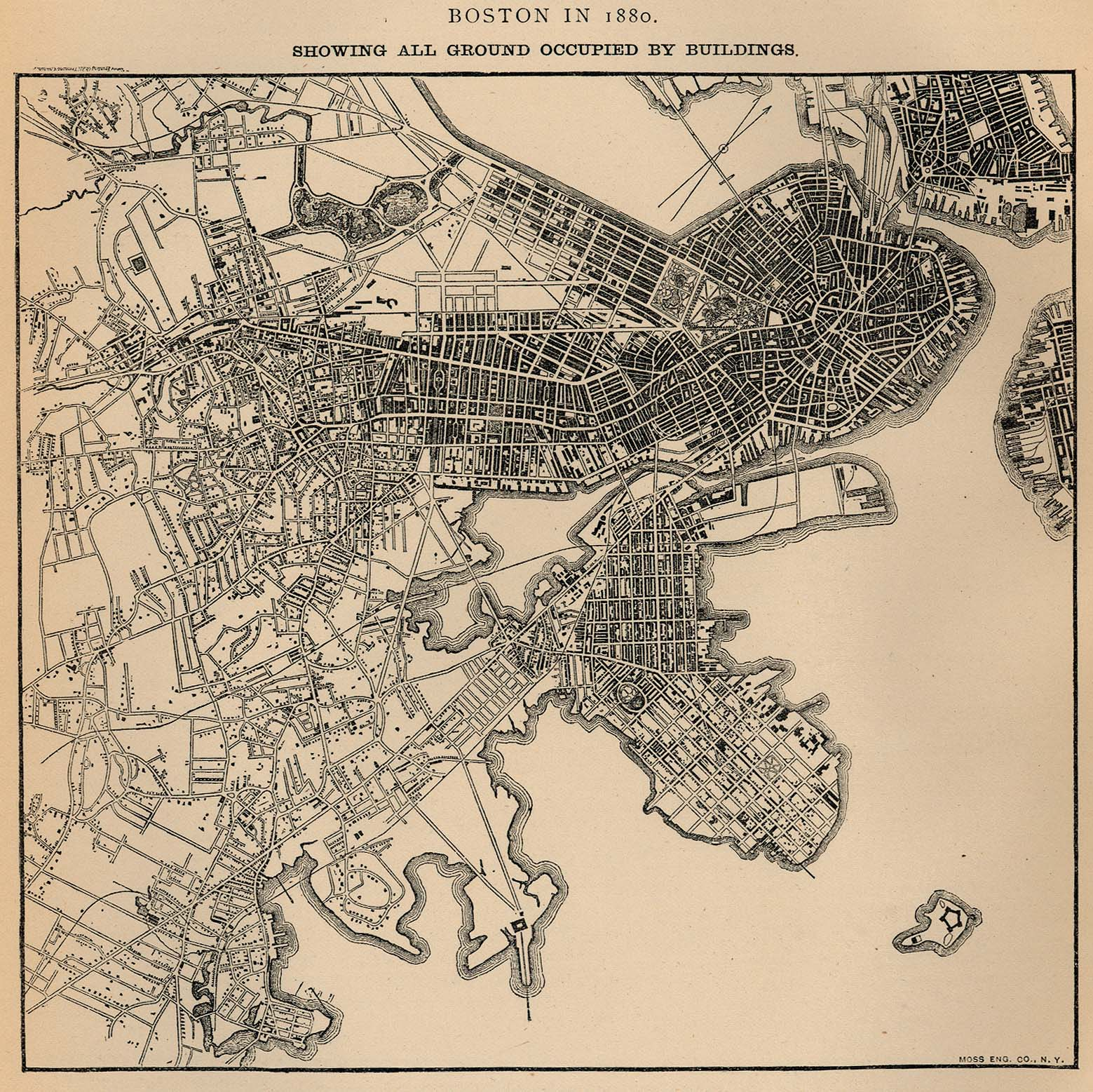
Map showing all ground in Boston occupied by buildings in 1880. Columbia Point is in the center near bottom with two roads going out to the pumping station and calf pasture. From U.S. Census Bureau.

In Dorchester, Columbia Point was the landing place for Puritan settlers in the early 1600s. The Native Americans called it "Mattaponnock".

The community was, in the 17th and 18th centuries, and through to the mid-19th century, a calf pasture: a place where nearby Dorchester residents took their calves for grazing. It was largely an uninhabited marshland on the Dorchester peninsula. Its size was originally 14 acres (5.7 hectares). Many landfills, subsequent to that time, have enlarged the land size to 350 acres (140 ha) in the 20th century.

In 1845, the Old Colony Railroad ran through the area and connected Boston and Plymouth, Massachusetts. The station was originally called Crescent Avenue or Crescent Avenue Depot as an Old Colony Railroad station, then called Columbia until December 1, 1982, and then again changed to JFK/UMass. It is an MBTA rail line station for both the subway and commuter rail line.

In the 1880s, the calf pasture was used as a Boston sewer line and pumping station, known as the Calf Pasture Pumping Station Complex. This large pumping station still stands and in its time was a model for treating sewage and helping to promote cleaner and healthier urban living conditions. It pumped waste to a remote treatment facility on Moon Island in Boston Harbor, and served as a model for other systems worldwide. This system remained in active use and was the Boston Sewer system's headworks, handling all of the city's sewage, until 1968 when a new treatment facility was built on Deer Island. The pumping station is also architecturally significant as a Richardsonian Romanesque designed by the then Boston city architect, George Clough. It is also the only remaining 19th-century building on Columbia Point and is in the National Register of Historic Places.

=== 1900s–50s ===
Columbia Point housing from Carson Beach. The photo depicts a 1977 racial conflict between residents of Columbia Point and South Boston for the use of Carson Beach and the L Street bath house.

Land-filling had caused the creation of Columbus Park on the peninsula and what was then called “Day Boulevard”, now Morrissey Boulevard, by 1934. There was a huge trash dump on the peninsula which turned into more landfill for other use.

During World War II, small barracks were built on this landfill for some prisoners of war. After the war, these were re-used for the Columbia Point Veterans Village. Also, in 1950, Boston College High School relocated from the South End of Boston to its present home on Morrissey Boulevard.

More landfill on the north shore of the peninsula had been created to build the Columbia Point Development housing projects which were the largest in Boston and New England and built by the Boston Housing Authority. The area was now known as Columbia Point. The Columbia Point Development was completed in 1954 and had 1,500 apartments in 27 nearly identical three- and seven-story buildings. When the Columbia Point public housing project opened in 1953, its initial demographics reflected that of the city's population: white tenants made up more than 90 percent of the population while black families made up approximately 7 percent. All reports at the time indicated that racial and ethnic tensions were minimal, that there were high levels of social trust within the neighborhood, and by 1955, had a long waiting list of families wanting to become new tenants. Other infrastructure was added, including public schools. The MBTA rapid transit stop was called Columbia, later to be known as the JFK/UMass stop on the Red Line.

=== 1960s ===
In the 1960s, there was a movement of community residents from the Columbia Point housing projects to get the city dump, which was located on the peninsula, permanently closed. They were able to get attorney F. Lee Bailey interested and to represent them. Eventually, the city dump closed in 1962 and the private dump, called Mile Road Dump, was ordered closed in February 1963 by the Massachusetts Supreme Court. Under the tenure of Boston Mayor John F. Collins (1960–1968), the Boston Housing Authority segregated the public housing developments in the city of Boston by moving black families into the development at Columbia Point while reserving developments in South Boston (such as West Broadway Housing Development) for white families who started refusing assignment to the Columbia Point project by the early 1960s.

In 1965, the first community health center in the United States was built on Columbia Point, the Columbia Point Community Health Center, and was founded by two Tufts University medical doctors, Jack Geiger and Count Gibson. Geiger had previously studied the first community health centers and the principles of Community Oriented Primary Care with Sidney Kark and colleagues while serving as a medical student in rural Natal, South Africa. The health center was funded by the federal government's Office of Economic Opportunity (OEO) and was needed to serve the community living in the Columbia Point Public Housing Projects which was on the isolated peninsula far away from Boston City Hospital. The center still stands and is in use today as the Geiger-Gibson Community Health Center on Mount Vernon Street. In 2012, due to shifting demographics, Geiger-Gibson Community Health Center reduced its primary care hours and focus, moving its primary care patients to the Neponset Health Center in the Neponset neighborhood of Dorchester.

In 1967, the Boston Redevelopment Authority (BRA) published a study, titled An Urban Campus by the Sea, which proposed locating the University of Massachusetts Boston campus permanently at the former Columbia Point landfill. In December 1968, the University of Massachusetts Board of Trustees voted 12 to 4 to accept the Columbia Point proposal from the BRA. The initial reactions of the residents of Columbia Point and Savin Hill were mixed. A coalition of 26 community organizations in Columbia Point and Dorchester formed the "Dorchester Tenants Action Council" (DTAC) to prevent an influx of students into the public housing project on Mount Vernon Street. As construction for the Columbia Point campus began, DTAC demanded the creation of a joint task force to address their housing concerns, while some within DTAC called for the university to construct dormitories as part of the Columbia Point proposal; legislation for doing so was proposed within the Massachusetts House of Representatives but failed to pass. In addition to DTAC, the Columbia Point Community Development Council also asked that a number of construction jobs be reserved for residents of the projects, including "set asides" for non-union minority workers that would later become a source of friction between the community groups and the university against the construction management firm, McKee-Berger-Mansueto (MBM) overseeing the project, its subcontractors, and the construction unions.

=== 1970s–80s ===
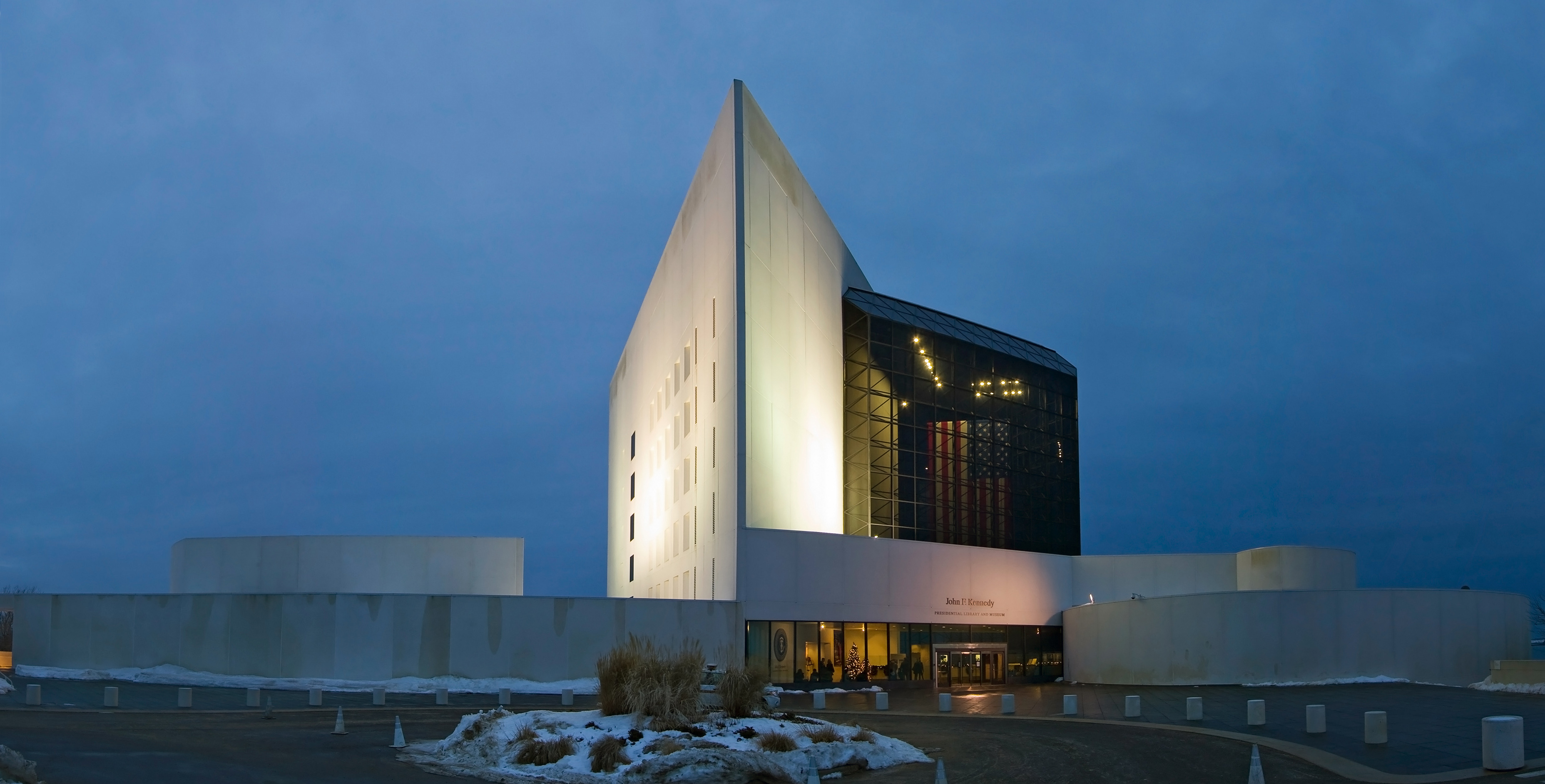
John F. Kennedy Presidential Library and Museum on the Columbia Point peninsula

In 1974, the University of Massachusetts Boston campus was opened on the tip of Columbia Point, and called the Harbor Campus.

In 1977, after an unsuccessful bid to have the John F. Kennedy Library in Cambridge, Massachusetts close to Harvard University, ground was broken at the tip of Columbia Point for the John F. Kennedy Presidential Library and Museum, designed by the architect I. M. Pei, and dedicated on October 20, 1979.

The Columbia Point Housing Projects fell into disrepair and became quite dangerous. By the mid-1970s the Boston Housing Authority was under community, political, and legal pressure and orders to renovate and cure the living conditions at the site. By the time the UMass Boston campus opened in 1974, only 75 percent of the units in the Columbia Point housing project were occupied, and the BHA now thought of the complex as "housing of last resort." In 1986, construction began for the new Harbor Point Apartments complex to replace the original Columbia Point public housing project, and was completed in 1990. By the 1980s, only 300 families were living in the housing development, in part, because the Boston Housing Authority had allowed the buildings to deteriorate and be occupied by squatters, and the public housing project had drawn comparisons to the Pruitt–Igoe Apartments in St. Louis and the Cabrini–Green Homes in Chicago. As a consequence, the Boston city government leased the development on a 99-year contract to a private developer composed of a tenant-run community task force and the Corcoran-Mullins-Jennison Corporation that was supported by the university. The housing development is now billed as luxury apartments.

Lacking the federal, state, and local government investment required to renovate Columbia Point while maintaining the deep affordability attached to public housing, the Boston Housing Authority and City of Boston made the decision to turn the property over to a private company to redevelop the area into a luxury, market-rate apartment complex with a portion of the units set aside as subsidized privately owned units. In 1984, the firm Corcoran-Mullins-Jennison was given control of the management, planning, demolition and renovation for the Columbia Point Housing Projects. A 99-year lease from the city of Boston was granted to and co-owned by the (Harbor Point Apartments, L.P.) Harbor Point Community Task Force (tenants' elected board) and a partnership of developers led by Corcoran-Mullins-Jennison Corporation. Construction on the new Harbor Point development began in 1986. During a recession in 1988 with a slump in the housing market, deficits and expensive loans ($175 million in state and federal loans), the Harbor Point development came close to bankruptcy. Chevron Corporation rescued the redevelopment by investing $34 million, with Chevron taking advantage of $38 million in corporate tax credits and depreciation established by Congress in 1986 encouraging private investment in low-income housing. The renovations to the newly mixed-income complex, renamed Harbor Point Apartments, were completed in 1990 with 1200 apartments: 800 market-rate and 400 subsidized (compared to the previous 1,500 units public housing units). It has received praise for its planning and revitalization from the Urban Land Institute, the FIABCI award, a gold medal with the Rudy Bruner Award for Urban Excellence in 1993, and was used as a model for the federal HUD HOPE VI public housing demolition and redevelopment program begun in 1992.

Two Boston architects were instrumental in the redesign of Columbia Point Housing Projects into the new and upscale Harbor Point Apartments: Joan E. Goody and Samuel "Sy" Mintz. Goody was interested in putting townhouses on the property whereas Mintz worked on re-vitalizing and re-making the existing buildings and their footprints.

=== 2000s ===
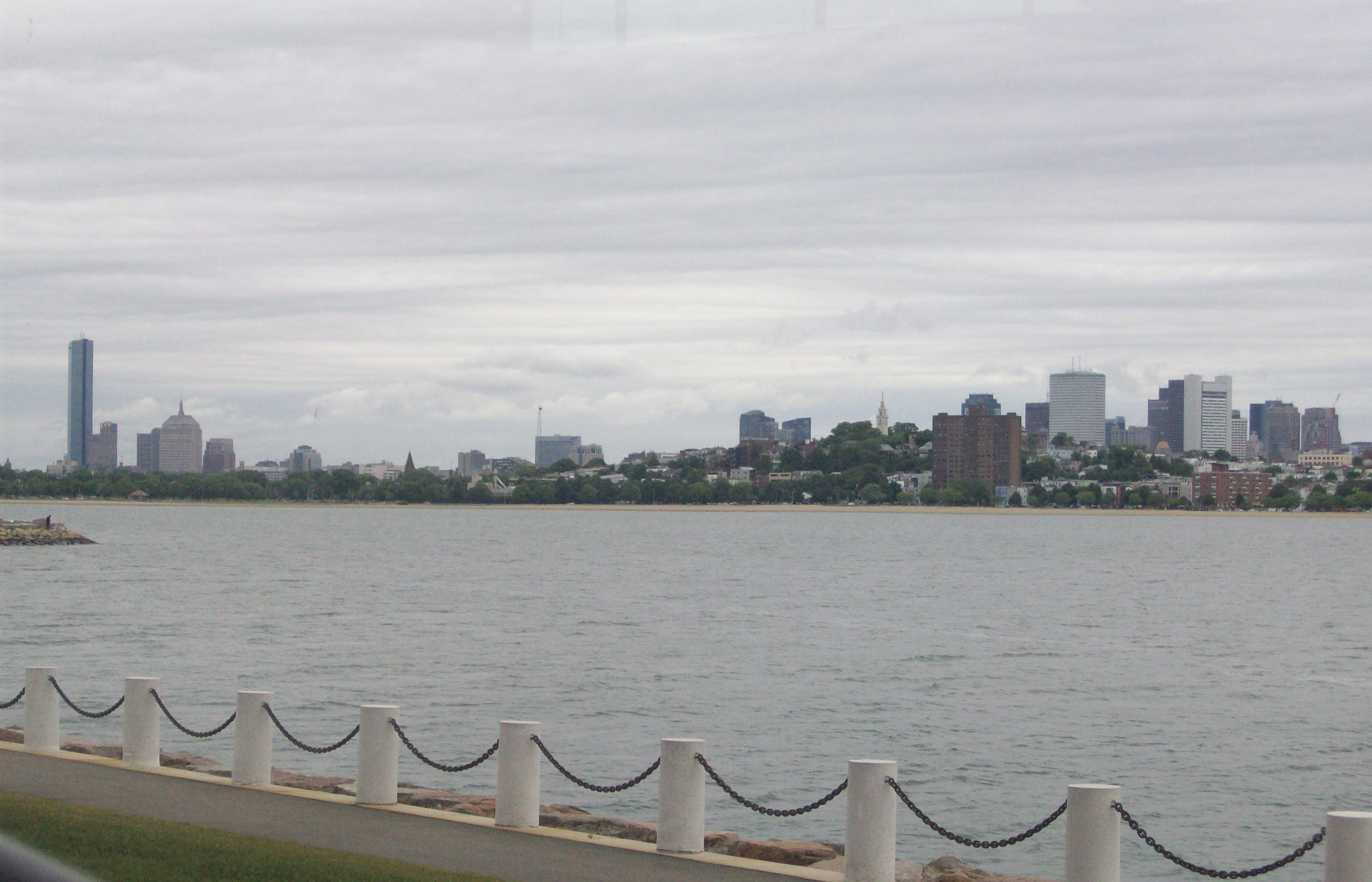
View of Old Harbor at Columbia Point.

In 2008, plans and proposals were unveiled and presented to public community hearings by the Corcoran-Jennison Company to redevelop the 30-acre (12 ha) Bayside Exposition Center site on the Columbia Point peninsula into a mixed use village of storefronts and residences, called "Bayside on the Point". There were serious problems with the ongoing development plans, since the Massachusetts Water Resources Authority had planned to build a sewage odor control facility just adjacent to the development site.

However, in 2009, the Bayside Expo Center property was lost in a foreclosure on Corcoran-Jennison to a Florida-based real estate firm, LNR/CMAT, who bought it. Soon after, the University of Massachusetts Boston bought the property from them to build future campus facilities. In February 2010, The University of Massachusetts Boston in conjunction with the University of Massachusetts Building Authority formally signed the purchase papers and bought the Bayside Expo property for $18.7 million. In 2010, the university plans to break ground and start building a new science laboratory and other facilities.

In late 2012, a developer, Synergy Investments, announced plans to put up a residential building at 25 Morrissey Blvd. right next to the JFK/UMass train stop, on an abandoned lot, to further develop the foot of the Columbia Point peninsula. Also, in 2012, developer Corcoran-Jennison Companies announced plans to build another residential building on Mt. Vernon Street on the site of the office complex next to the former Bayside Expo.

In 2014, the Boston Redevelopment Authority began a study on redeveloping the main road on Columbia Point, Mount Vernon Street, in conjunction with the Master Plan for the peninsula.

On March 30, 2015 the Edward M. Kennedy Institute for the United States Senate was dedicated by President Barack Obama, with Vice President Joe Biden in attendance. The Institute has been open to the public since March 31, 2015.

In 2018, discussions opened up as to what to do with the two Boston Public schools on Columbia Point: Dever Elementary School, which was in receivership, and the McCormack Middle School. There were plans for a high school to be placed there.

In Fall 2018, UMASS/Boston opened up two new high-rise student dormitory buildings on the campus next to the Athletic Complex. These were the first on-campus dormitories built at UMASS/Boston.

In 2019, The Bayside Expo site now leveled and owned by UMASS/Boston is leased out for 99 years for development to Accordia Partners for $235 million.

In October 2018, Boston Mayor Marty Walsh announced a comprehensive climate change adaptation proposal to protect the Boston Harbor coastline from coastal flooding, and in October 2020, the Walsh administration released a 174-page climate change adaptation report for the Boston Harbor coastline in Dorchester with a section on Columbia Point and Morrissey Boulevard. In March 2022, the Boston Planning & Development Agency (BPDA) approved a proposal by the Dorchester Boys & Girls Club and the Martin Richard Foundation to construct a 3-story field house on Mount Vernon Street. In July 2022, Boston Mayor Michelle Wu vetoed a $5 million amendment for the field house proposal that had been approved by the Boston City Council for the COVID-19 pandemic aid package the city received under the American Rescue Plan Act of 2021 despite supporting the proposal itself. In August 2022, Massachusetts Governor Charlie Baker signed into law an instrastructure spending bill that included a $1 million appropriation for the field house proposal. In October 2022, the Boston Zoning Board of Appeals approved the field house proposal.

== Timeline ==
Source: Lawton, University of Massachusetts Boston, research materials

- 1630 – Puritan settlers land on Columbia Point. The site is used as a calf pasture for the town of Dorchester until 1869
- 1884 – The Sewage pumping station opens at the end of Mile Road.
- 1942 – Camp McKay, used to house Italian prisoners during World War II, is built on the north side of the peninsula.
- 1954 – Columbia Point housing project opens and the first tenants move in.
- 1965 – The Columbia Point Health Center, the first community health center in the country, opens.
- 1966 – Construction of the Bayside Mall begins.
- 1971 – Construction of University of Massachusetts Boston begins.
- 1974 – The Harbor Campus of the University of Massachusetts Boston, opens on Columbia Point.
- 1975 – Tenants at several public housing projects file suit against the Boston Housing Authority, complaining of sub-standard living conditions.
- 1978 – The Boston Redevelopment Authority receives a $10 million federal grant for improvements at the Columbia Point housing project.
- 1979 – The Boston Housing Authority is placed in receivership by the courts.
- 1979 – The John F. Kennedy Presidential Library and Museum is formally dedicated.
- 1984 – The Boston Housing Authority’s receivership ends and Corcoran, Mullins, Jennison, a private development company, takes over the management of Columbia Point, initiating a major cleanup and intensive maintenance improvements.
- 1985 – The Massachusetts State Archives opens in November.
- 1986 – The construction of the new Harbor Point housing complex, a mixed-income community, on the site of the former Columbia Point housing projects, begins.
- 1998 – Harbor Point Apartments achieves a 99% occupancy rate and celebrates its tenth anniversary.
- 2008 – A proposal for the re-development of the Bayside Exposition Center site into a mixed residential and commercial property to be called "Bayside on the Point" was offered for public perusal.
- 2009 – The Bayside Exposition Center site is lost in a foreclosure and eventually sold to the University of Massachusetts Boston.
- 2010 – The University of Massachusetts Boston formally buys the Bayside Expo property for $18.7 million in February 2010
- 2015 – The Edward M. Kennedy Institute for the United States Senate opened to the public in March.
- 2018 - Two student dormitory buildings are opened for UMASS/Boston on the peninsula
- 2019 - The Bayside Expo site owned by UMASS/Boston is leased out for 99 years for development to Accordia Partners for $235 million
