= 1993 Boston City Council election =

1995 Boston City Council election
- November 2, 1993

Boston City Council elections were held on November 2, 1993. All thirteen seats (nine district representatives and four at-large members) were contested in the general election, while ten seats (six districts and the four at-large members) had also been contested in the preliminary election held on September 21, 1993.

The large number of preliminary candidates followed a reduction in the number of signatures required for a candidate to appear on the ballot, from 1500 to 500.

Since the composition of the council changed in 1984, to four at-large seats and nine district representatives, no candidate who had run for re-election had lost. However, two incumbents—Anthony Crayton and David Scondras—were defeated by challengers in this election.

== At-large ==
Councillors John A. Nucci and Dapper O'Neil were re-elected. Councillors Bruce Bolling and Rosaria Salerno did not seek re-election, as they were running for Mayor of Boston; their seats were won by Richard P. Iannella and Peggy Davis-Mullen. Iannella was the son of former Council president Christopher A. Iannella, while unsuccessful candidate Michael Travaglini was the brother of outgoing District 1 Councillor Robert Travaglini.

Candidates	Preliminary Election		General Election	
Candidates	Votes	%	Votes	%
John A. Nucci	42,970	14.4%	53,531	16.7%
Dapper O'Neil	42,069	14.1%	52,900	16.5%
Richard P. Iannella	34,065	11.4%	52,542	16.4%
Peggy Davis-Mullen	29,389	9.9%	40,340	12.6%
Stephen J. Murphy	20,472	6.9%	31,294	9.7%
Michael Travaglini	19,976	6.7%	31,014	9.7%
Francis Costello	21,131	7.1%	30,367	9.5%
Eddie Jenkins Jr.	16,249	5.5%	28,986	9.0%
Brian P. Wallace	12,231	4.1%		
Karen MacNutt	11,885	4.0%		
Jose Vincenty	10,606	3.6%		
Joseph Delgardo	6,886	2.3%		
Karen Ray	6,654	2.2%		
Gary Dotterman	5,404	1.8%		
Frank G. Williams	5,376	1.8%		
Daniel J. Carey	5,339	1.8%		
Edward T. Wheeler	4,019	1.3%		
Martin A. Coughlin	3,308	1.3%		

== District 1 ==
Councillor Robert Travaglini, who had been elected to the Massachusetts Senate in November 1992, did not seek re-election to the City Council; his seat was won by Diane J. Modica.

Candidates	Preliminary Election		General Election	
Candidates	Votes	%	Votes	%
Diane J. Modica	4,010†	28.4%	8,008	54.6%
James Costello	2,814†	19.9%	6,663	45.4%
Robert Cappucci	2,662†	18.8%		
Domenic A. Piso	2,310	16.3%		
Maria DiLibero	1,822	12.9%		
Tom Pizzi	300	2.1%		
Richard Rosa	218	1.5%		

† per preliminary election recount

== District 2 ==
Councillor James M. Kelly was re-elected.

Candidates	General Election	
Candidates	Votes	%
James M. Kelly	12,344	85.8%
Ali J. Fiumedoro	2,050	14.2%

== District 3 ==
Councillor James E. Byrne did not seek re-election; his seat was won by Maureen Feeney, his neighborhood liaison.

Candidates	Preliminary Election		General Election	
Candidates	Votes	%	Votes	%
Maureen Feeney	6,673	49.4%	9,769	70.7%
Joseph P. McDermott	2,118	15.7%	4,041	29.3%
Michael F. Kenneally	1,394	10.3%		
Thomas J. Doherty	1,335	9.9%		
Patrick J. Walsh	1,026	7.6%		
Nancy E. Kavanagh	965	7.1%		

== District 4 ==
Councillor Charles Yancey was re-elected.

Candidates	General Election	
Candidates	Votes	%
Charles Yancey	5,302	87.6%
J. R. Rucker	753	12.4%

== District 5 ==
The seat of Councillor Thomas Menino, who had been acting mayor since July 1993 and won the mayoral election, was won by Daniel F. Conley.

Candidates	Preliminary Election		General Election	
Candidates	Votes	%	Votes	%
Daniel F. Conley	6,210	37.9%	10,631	59.1%
John Pulgini	3,884	23.7%	7,355	40.9%
John P. Grady	2,945	18.0%		
Rita E. Walsh	1,990	12.1%		
John J. Kenney	642	3.9%		
Kenneth W. Spolsino	436	2.7%		
John H. Sheerin	276	1.7%		

== District 6 ==
Councillor Maura Hennigan was re-elected.

Candidates	General Election	
Candidates	Votes	%
Maura Hennigan	10,465	64.7%
Gerard J. McCarthy	5,714	35.3%

== District 7 ==
Councillor Anthony Crayton was defeated by Gareth R. Saunders.

Candidates	Preliminary Election		General Election‡		Recount	
Candidates	Votes	%	Votes	%	Votes	%
Gareth R. Saunders	1,447†	25.7%	3,028	49.4%	3,137	50.7%
Anthony Crayton	1,824†	32.4%	3,097	50.6%	3,047	49.3%
Roy A. Owens	1,417†	25.2%				
Phyllis Bailey	693	12.3%				
Ray F. Green	247	4.4%				

† per preliminary election recount
‡ Saunders was later declared the winner, due to discovery of a tally sheet error; his victory was subsequently confirmed via recount.

== District 8 ==
Councillor David Scondras was defeated by Thomas M. Keane Jr.

Candidates	Preliminary Election		General Election		Recount	
Candidates	Votes	%	Votes	%	Votes	%
Thomas M. Keane Jr.	2,403	39.8%	3,648	50.2%	3,649	50.2%
David Scondras	3,271	54.2%	3,621	49.8%	3,622	49.8%
Dan Huck	366	6.1%				

== District 9 ==
Councillor Brian J. McLaughlin was re-elected.

Candidates	Preliminary Election		General Election		Recount	
Candidates	Votes	%	Votes	%	Votes	%
Brian J. McLaughlin	4,213	46.1%	4,585	51.6%	4,561	50.9%
Jerry P. McDermott	2,398	26.3%	4,295	48.4%	4,400	49.1%
Rosina T. Bowman	1,742	19.1%				
Will Luxier	617	6.8%				
John W. Carmilia	162	1.8%				

== See also ==
- List of members of the Boston City Council
- 1993 Boston mayoral election
