= Bruce Bolling =

American politician (1945–2012)

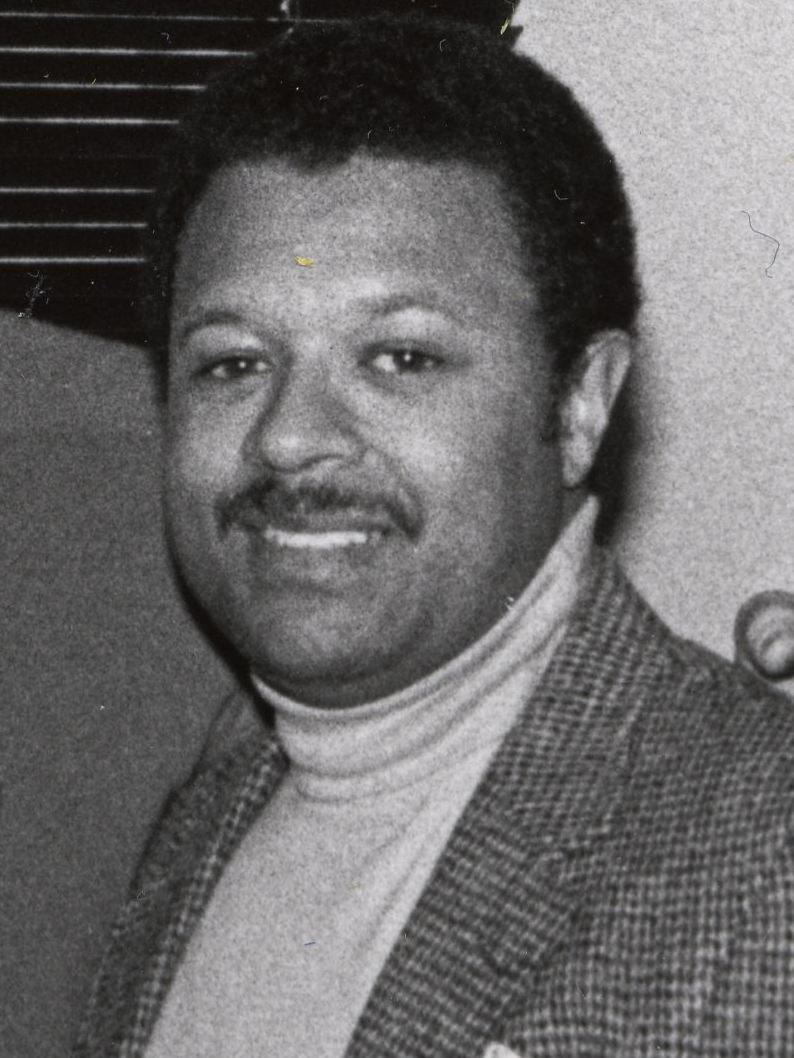
- Bolling, circa 1984-1987

President of the Boston City Council
- In office January 1986 – December 1987
- Preceded by: Joseph M. Tierney
- Succeeded by: Christopher A. Iannella

Member of the Boston City Council
- In office September 1992 – December 1994
- Preceded by: Christopher A. Iannella
- Succeeded by: Peggy Davis-Mullen and Richard P. Iannella
- Constituency: at-large
- In office January 1984 – December 1991
- Preceded by: district created
- Succeeded by: Anthony Crayton
- Constituency: District 7
- In office January 1982 – December 1984
- Preceded by: Lawrence DiCara, Patrick F. McDonough, Rosemarie Sansone, and John W. Sears
- Succeeded by: number of at-large seats decreased
- Constituency: at-large

Personal details
- Born: April 29, 1945
- Died: September 11, 2012 (aged 67) Boston, Massachusetts, US
- Spouse(s): Carol Ann Nicholson; Joyce Ferriabough
- Education: M.Ed. Cambridge College

Bruce Carlton Bolling (April 29, 1945 – September 11, 2012) was a politician and businessman in Boston, Massachusetts. He was a member of the Boston City Council and served as the council's first black president in the mid-1980s. He unsuccessfully ran for mayor of Boston in 1993.

== Early years and family ==
Bolling was born April 29, 1945, in Boston. He was from "the city's most politically successful black family. His father, Royal L. Bolling, served as a state senator and his brother, Royal L. Bolling Jr., served as state representative." He had eleven siblings: three brothers and eight sisters. Bolling's father is described to have been "one of the city's pioneering black politicians" at the time Bolling was growing up. Bolling was raised in Roxbury, a neighborhood which was multicultural. The main racial demographic of his neighborhood was white, including some Jewish residents. However, the neighborhood was diversifying at the time of his childhood, with well-off African Americans moving in. Bolling would as an adult characterize the 1950s in Roxbury as relatively idyllic, including in regards to the relations at the time between its white and growing black populations. Bolling was educated at Boston English High School, Lindsey Wilson College, and received a master's degree in education from Antioch University (now Cambridge College). In the mid-1980s, he took courses at the Kennedy School of Government at Harvard, earning credits towards a possible Master's degree in public administration.

After graduating from Northeastern University, Bolling served in the United States Coast Guard, being discharged in 1969.

Bolling married Carol Ann Nicholson (who took his surname). His wife had originally been from Saint Thomas, U.S. Virgin Islands. He continued to live in Roxbury during his adulthood. Later in his life, he remarried to Joyce Ferriabough-Bolling.

== Early political and government career ==
Bolling believed his family upbringing had set him up to become a politician. In 1977, he unsuccessfully ran for the Boston City Council. He placed sixteenth, failing to win one of the nineteen seats for election. After being discharged from the Coast Guard, Bolling began working as a functionary in the administration of Mayor Kevin White. In the mayoral administration, he filled a variety of roles over the course of several year. This included holding positions in the Office of Public Safety and serving as the manager of a mayoral administration field office (a "Little City Hall") at Franklin Field.

== City council ==
Bolling served on the Boston City Council between the years 1982 and 1994. He came to be considered the city's best-known black politician.

Despite promoting numerous progressive causes on the council and receiving support from liberal organizations, Bolling was widely considered a political moderate. Bolling was regarded to have occupied a role as a bridge between the local African American community and the city's predominantly white political establishment. He managed the balancing act of appealing both to the city's black electorate, as well as politically moderate working class white voters. He was considered to have been slow to join other black political leaders in calling out racial inequities, taking a relatively conciliatory tone on issues of race. This tone on issues of race earned him respect from many white voters, but also frustrated some in the city's black community. His overall approach to politics on the council was to work quietly at assembling consensus for his proposals, as opposed to taking a more confrontational approach. Bolling agreed with characterizations of himself as a compromise-seeking moderate, remarking in early 1992, "I've never seen myself as a down-the-line liberal. I try to look at what the impact of issues will be, one way or the other." The Bay State Banner described Bolling's image and political approach,

Dapper and naturally charismatic with an extensive knowledge of legislative procedure, Bolling worked toward compromise and consensus on the council. He campaigned to create a "better Boston" that reflected fairness for the city’s emerging communities…Bolling served as a racial healer in the aftermath of Boston's busing crisis in the 1970s.

=== First term (1982–83) ===
In the 1981 Boston City Council election, Bolling was elected to the Boston City Council, in the final election when all seats were at-large. Bolling's candidacy had received the backing of the political machine of Mayor White. White had backed a slate of seven candidates for council that year, who got dubbed "Kevin's Seven". Of these seven, Bolling was the only to win election. Bolling was the first black councilor to be elected in ten years since.

In his first term, Bolling was the chairman of the council's Committee On Planning, Development and Housing. In this position, he led the 1982 passage of an ordinance establishing the creation of the city's first Fair Housing Commission, which investigated discriminatory housing practices. When working to secure support from more conservative council members (necessary for the ordinance to pass), Bolling opted to privately persuade councilors in private by assuaging concerns and offering compromises, rather than publicly pressuring them to adopt his original proposal. This reflected Bolling's overall approach during his council tenure of working quietly to assemble consensus for his proposals. Bolling spearheaded the establishment of the city's first-ever Arson Prevention Commission, in order to address the 1982 Boston arson spree (a significant epidemic of arson that the city was experiencing).

In 1982, Bolling and Raymond Flynn were the sole votes against the adoption of a map for the council's new district seats.

Bolling's father's return to the Massachusetts Legislature (being elected to the Massachusetts Senate in 1982, and joining his two sons as incumbent elected officeholders) elevated the Bolling family's political stature. The Boston Globe described the Bolling family as having become "the most prominent black political family in Boston". The Globe noted that it marked the first instance in Boston's politics that three members of the same family had simultaneously held office. It also noted that the three Bolling men were nearly half of the city's entire roster of black incumbent elected officials, therefore playing a major role in government representation of the city's African American community (at the time, nearly 22% of the city's population).

In 1983 the city adopted the Bolling-sponsored the Boston Linkage Ordinance, which required that developers of projects constructed on downtown public land must fund development projects in the city's non-downtown neighborhoods. This police brought millions of dollars to those neighborhoods. The linkage policy became a major subject of the city's 1983 mayoral election, with Raymond Flynn and Mel King (ultimately, the winner and runner-up) being the only two candidates who supported imposing linkage fees. During the city's 1983 election, voters overwhelming supported a Massachusetts Fair Share-backed non-binding referendum in favor of linkage policies. Bolling's linkage package, which was included in comprehensive housing legislation that he was involved in crafting as chair of the relevant council committee, was controversial. It aimed to use funds collected from developers of downtown construction projects to invest in the construction of affordable housing in the city's residential neighborhoods.

The council also passed the Bolling-sponsored "Boston Jobs for Boston residents" policy, which mandated that construction projects receiving public funding in Boston must utilize a workforce that includes at least 50% Boston residents, 25% people of color, and 10% women.

=== Second term (1984–85) ===
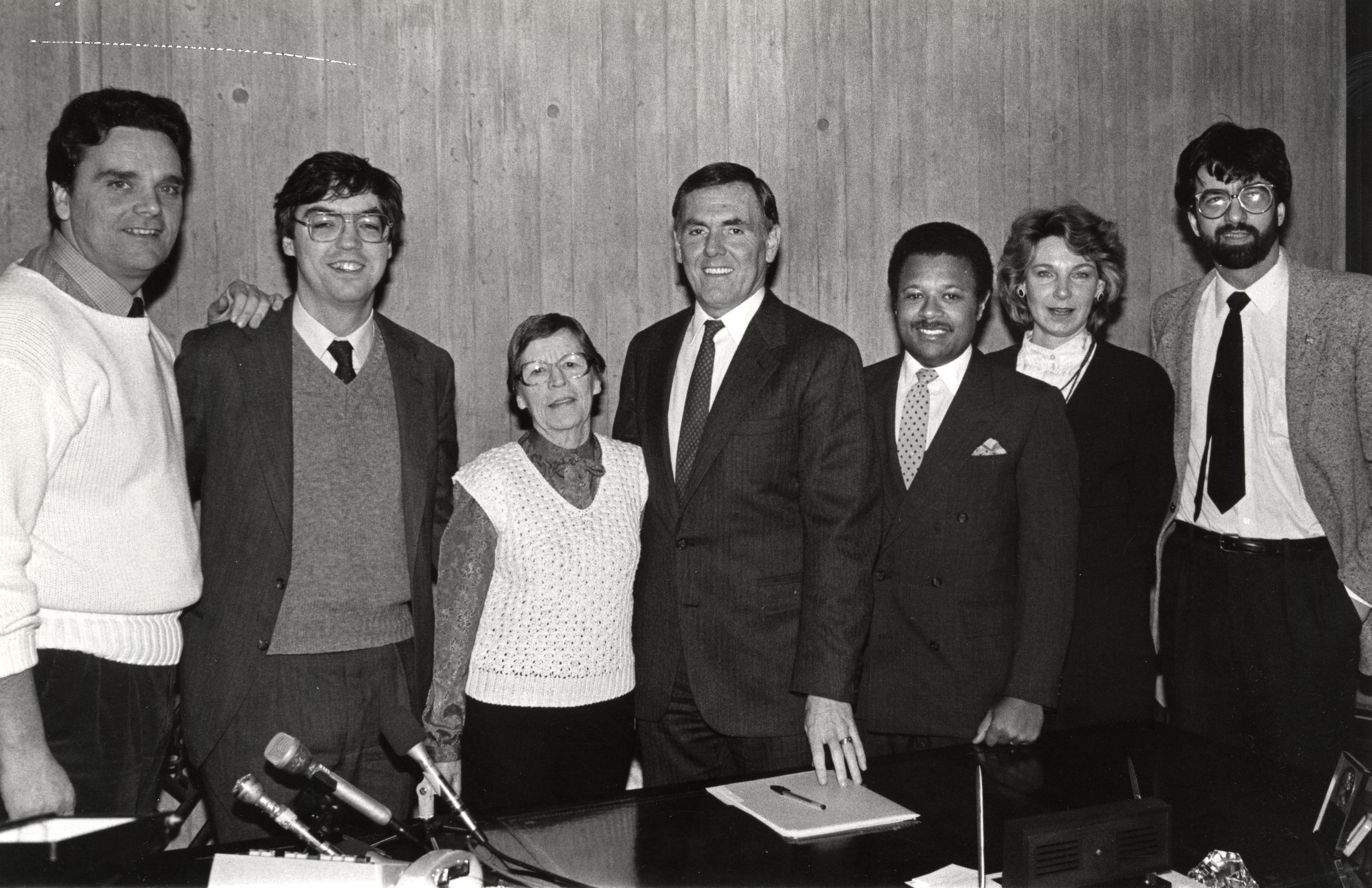
Bolling (third from right) next to Mayor Raymond Flynn (center), with several Boston City Council members, circa 1984–87)

In 1983, Bolling was elected the inaugural councilmember to represent the 7th district (situated in Roxbury). He would win re-election to three further 2-year terms representing the seat in the subsequent elections.

In 1984, Democratic voters of the 2nd Suffolk district elected Bolling to represent the district on the Massachusetts Democratic Party's state committee. Bolling was unopposed for the position.

In October 1984, Bolling was of six councilors to vote against Mayor Raymond Flynn's 1984 rent control ordinance, thus defeating it. He also was one of five to vote against James M. Kelly's compromise rent control package, which was adopted. His opposition to rent control attracted criticism from tenant groups.

=== Third term and council presidency (1986–87) ===
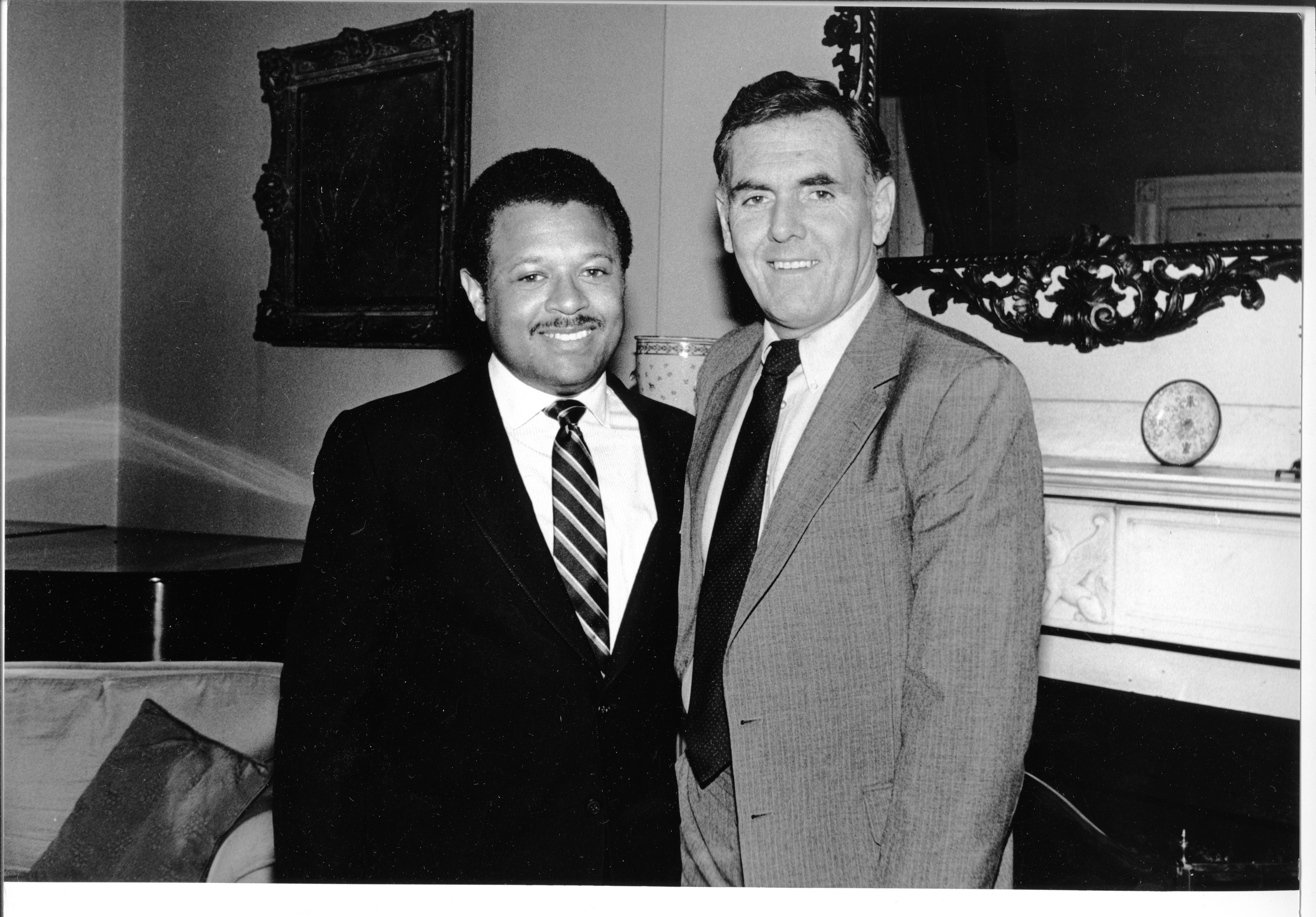
Bolling with Mayor Flynn, circa 1984–87

Bolling was re-elected to his district 7 seat in 1985.

Bolling was council president in 1986 and 1987, being the first Black person to hold that position.

In 1986, the council and mayor adopted Bolling-sponsored legislation which created the Neighborhood Housing Trust Fund that developers pay into under the city's Inclusionary Zoning statute. The passed legislation was created as a compromise from an earlier proposal, and was written in collaboration with Councilman James M. Kelly. It expanded the city's linkage policy. By 2014, the policy was credited with creating in excess of 4,000 units of affordable housing in the city. By the end of Raymond Flynn's mayoralty in 1993, this fund had already received over $70 million, which helped in the city's creation of over 8,000 units of affordable housing.

Bolling was the sponsor of the Minority and Women Business Enterprise Ordinance. The ordinance, adopted in 1987, increased the availability of municipal contracts to businesses owned by people of color, women, as well as small local businesses.

Bolling fought against an effort to have some of the minority-majority areas of Boston secede and form a new city (Mandela, Massachusetts). This idea was floated by some African American activists as a more radical means of addressing racial tensions and underlying issues.

In November 1986, Bolling's brother lost his State House seat. This decreased the collective political stature of the Bolling family.

In 1987, Bolling introduced an ordinance which, if it had been adopted, would have required the city's police to arrest professional athletes who committed violent acts during game play at the city's professional sports arena (Boston Garden), exempting only boxing. The ordinance was proposed in an era in which NHL professional ice hockey was particularly violent. The ordinance was criticized by prominent attorney Alan Dershowitz as being too vague (about what acts of violence it was intended to over) to be enforced.

In 1987, Bolling offered Mayor Flynn praise for his leadership on addressing racial violence, but also asserted that further work on addressing racial matters was necessary.

=== Fourth term (1988–89) ===
Bolling was re-elected to his district 7 seat in 1987.

During the 1988 Democratic Party presidential primaries, Bolling was the chair of the state committee for Jesse Jackson's campaign. Contrarily, Bolling's father was a supporter of the campaign of Massachusetts Governor Michael Dukakis.

In November 1988, Bolling's father lost his State Senate seat, leaving the younger Bolling the sole member of his family still in political office.

Bolling spearheaded the passage of the city's anti-redlining ordinance.

=== Fifth term (1990–91) ===
Bolling was re-elected to his district 7 seat in 1989.

Bolling attempted to calm racial tensions in the aftermath of the murder of Carol Stuart. Bolling, however, also stated that the police department's handling of the investigation (initially believing, and making arrests according to, the false description of an African American assailant, before the investigation turned its focus to Stuart's white husband) had brought harm to the city's black communities.

In 1991, Bolling proposed an ordinance which, if adopted, would have allowed police to levy fines and jail times as punishment for parents whose children had been engaged in gang-related violence or illegal drug use. This proposal generated significant controversy.

==== 1991 campaign for an at-large seat ====
In 1991 Bolling sought an at-large position on the council instead of seeking to retain his 7th district seat. While a campaign for his district seat would have likely set him up for an easy re-election, he had ambitions of a future mayoral run and believed that the pursuit of an at-large seat would give him an opportunity to build a citywide campaign organization in advance of a future mayoral campaign. However, he placed fifth, failing to win one of the four seats contested in the election. As a result, he left the council at the end of its 1990–91 term.

Having lost re-election, Bolling initially took a job with the lobbying firm McDermott/O'Neill Associates.

=== Sixth term (1992–93) ===
After being off the council several months following his unsuccessful run for an at-large seat, Bolling returned to the council in September 1992, following the death of at-large member Christopher A. Iannella. Because Bolling had finished fifth in the election for four at-large seats.

In 1992, Yancey was challenged by fellow city council member Charles Yancey in the vote for the 2nd Suffolk Democratic state party committeeman position. Bolling defeated Yancey 58.2% to 41.8%.

In October 1992, Bolling and Councilors Yancey and Anthony Crayton held a joint press conference in Roxbury at a street corner where two murders had occurred within a single week, during which they urged for the city's police department to pursue community policing partnerships with residents.

Bolling sponsored an enacted ordinance which created the city's first-ever gun buyback program; a then-revolutionary program which was a major component of the city's early 1990s crime reduction efforts. Whether or not the program, was a successful in contributing to a reduction in crime has been a matter of debate.

During the early 1990s state legislative redistricting, Bolling testified before the State House to urge the creation of more opportunity districts in order to facilitate greater representation of racial minorities in the State Legislature.

==== Taxi incident ====
In late 1992, an incident occurred in which Bolling got into an argument which a taxi driver refused to drive Bolling to his home in Roxbury. Bolling informed the driver that he was a reputable member of the City Council, but was still refused a ride to his neighborhood. Per Bolling's account, in the ensuing episode, a second taxi driver (trying to aide in physically removing Bolling from the seat of the cab) called Bolling a "nigger" (a highly-profane racial slur). Bolling publicly shared his experience, noting that having been called the slur felt highly degrading. Bolling's decision to go so public, as well as deliver remarks that tied the incident to other incidents of racism in the city, surprised many of his colleagues considering his previous much more mild-manner approach towards discussing matters of race.

This episode became a point of major discussion in Boston. Mayor Flynn declined to comment until after the police department reviewed the incident and whether it was a racial incident. Bolling expressed disappointment with the mayor for not publicly coming to his defense. Flynn also received criticism from some leaders in the black community for failing to immediately side with Bolling. Councilor Yancey criticized Flynn, arguing his failure to side with Bolling implied doubt of Bolling's credibility.

==== 1993 mayoral campaign ====
Bolling ran for Mayor of Boston in 1993, finishing fifth in the preliminary election.

== Later years and legacy ==
Bolling continued to serve on the Massachusetts Democratic Party State Committee, being re-elected for a final four-year term as committeeman in 1996.

From 2000 until his death, Bolling was director of MassAlliance, a firm specializing in small business development. He died of prostate cancer on September 11, 2012. He was 67.

In 2015, the Ferdinand Building in then-Dudley Square (now Nubian Square) was renamed the Bruce C. Bolling Municipal Building in his honor. This renaming had been recommended by Mayor Marty Walsh to the Boston Landmarks Commission, with the Boston City Council unanimously passing a resolution (authored by 7th district councilor Tito Jackson) to voice its support as well. The rededication ceremony was attended by his brother, Royal L. Bolling Jr., Massachusetts Governor Charlie Baker, Mayor Walsh, and other Massachusetts politicians.

== Electoral history ==
=== City Council elections ===
1977 Boston City Council election
Candidates	Preliminary election		General election	
Candidates	Votes	%	Votes	%
James Michael Connolly (incumbent)	22,212	5.92	37,479	7.97
Raymond Flynn	19,248	2.96	35,757	7.60
Christopher A. Iannella (incumbent)	21,577	6.64	35,682	7.59
Dapper O'Neil (incumbent)	20,875	6.42	35,543	7.56
Lawrence DiCara (incumbent)	19,048	5.86	32,232	6.85
Joseph M. Tierney (incumbent)	17,500	5.39	31,913	6.79
Rosemarie Sansone	12,954	3.99	30,531	6.49
Frederick C. Langone (incumbent)	15,156	4.66	30,268	6.44
Patrick F. McDonough (incumbent)	15,868	4.88	30,205	6.44
Louise Day Hicks (incumbent)	19,862	6.11	30,058	6.39
Gerald O'Leary	14,979	4.61	23,868	5.08
Gerard P. McHale	12,753	3.92	20,610	4.38
John J. Kerrigan (incumbent)	11,810	3.63	20,045	.4.26
Arnett L. Waters	10,589	3.26	18,109	3.85
Lawrence E. Blacke	9,801	3.02	16,899	3.59
Bruce Bolling	8,634	2.66	15,518	3.30
Stephen C. Farrell	8,505	2.62	13,980	2.97
Paul J. Ellison	7,919	2.22	11,542	2.45
William T. Donovan	7,198	2.22		
Elizabeth Buckley	6,886	2.12		
Robert Whitey McGrail	6,740	1.03		
Harold L. O’Brien	5,869	1.81		
James J. Tobin	4,907	1.51		
Polly Jane Halfkenny	4,380	1.35		
John T. Cuddy	4,288	1.32		
Celia M. Sniffin	3,965	1.22		
Diane Jacobs	3,827	1.18		
Norma Walsh Gramer	3,559	1.10		
Richard Hird	2,365	0.73		
George R. Geller	1,675	0.52		
scattering	1	0.00	4	0.00

1981 Boston City Council election
Candidates	Preliminary election		General election	
Candidates	Votes	%	Votes	%
Raymond Flynn (incumbent)	31,898	7.77	53,136	9.54
Christopher A. Iannella (incumbent)	25,462	6.20	44,621	8.01
Dapper O'Neil (incumbent)	24,240	5.91	40,474	7.27
Frederick C. Langone (incumbent)	23,000	5.60	39,780	7.14
Joseph M. Tierney (incumbent)	17,649	4.30	35,185	6.32
Michael J. McCormack	14,178	3.45	33,861	6.08
Terence P. McDermott	11,981	2.92	31,707	5.69
Maura Hennigan	14,325	3.49	31,637	5.68
Bruce Bolling	15,273	3.72	30,672	5.51
James M. Kelly	14,941	3.64	30,079	5.40
Patrick F. McDonough (incumbent)	17,165	4.18	29,591	5.31
Edmund McNamara	12,007	2.93	29,301	5.26
David Scondras	11,616	2.83	28,571	5.13
Charles Yancey	12,378	3.02	27,007	4.85
Francis X. Coppinger	11,034	2.69	21,675	3.89
Craig Lankhorst	10,301	2.51	20,769	3.73
Pamela J. Gilman	10,070	2.45	14,776	2.65
Gerard P. McHale	10,407	2.54	14,173	2.54
Joseph W. Casper	9,906	2.41		
Frederick T. Scopa	9,444	2.30		
John F. Melia	8,788	2.14		
Stephen G. Michaels	8,325	2.03		
Brian Hickey	8,222	2.00		
John P. Grady	7,855	1.91		
Richard B. Hogan	7,794	1.90		
Edward M. McCormack	7,610	1.85		
William G. Broderick	7,134	1.74		
Joseph E. Maher	6,269	1.53		
Maureen Craven Slade	5,759	1.40		
Althea Garrison	5,442	1.33		
Joseph T. Fitzpatrick	3,947	0.96		
David F. Burnes	3,784	0.92		
David Alan Mittell Jr.	3,660	0.89		
Francis X. Goode	3,227	0.79		
Thomas P. Casserly	3,005	0.73		
Warren I. Brown	3,001	0.73		
John S. MacDonald	2,881	0.70		
Edward J. DeSantis	2,688	0.65		
John B’Smith III	1,936	0.47		
John K. Rees	1,791	0.44		

1983 Boston City Council election (7th district)
Candidates	Preliminary election		General election	
Candidates	Votes	%	Votes	%
Bruce Bolling	7,556	59.1	9,049	63.9
Elizabeth "Betty" Jones	1,907	14.9	5,121	36.1
Ben Haith	1,315	10.3		
Roy A. Owens	1.146	9.0		
Steven A. Wise	567	4.4		
James Joseph	302	2.4		

1985 Boston City Council election (7th district)
Candidates	Preliminary election		General election	
Candidates	Votes	%	Votes	%
Bruce Bolling (incumbent)	1,505	70.3	2,386	68.0
Roy A. Owens	448	20.9	1,121	32.0
Robert Polk	108	5.0		
Charles H. Durant	80	3.7		

1987 Boston City Council election (7th district)
Candidates	General election	
Candidates	Votes	%
Bruce Bolling (incumbent)	4,264	70.3
Roy A. Owens	1,803	29.7

1989 Boston City Council election (7th district)
Candidates	Preliminary election		General election	
Candidates	Votes	%	Votes	%
Bruce Bolling (incumbent)	998	57.1	2,330	60.1
Roy A. Owens	391	22.4	1,547	39.9
Michael Long	358	20.5		

1991 Boston City Council election (at-large)
Candidates	Preliminary election		General election	
Candidates	Votes	%	Votes	%
Dapper O'Neil (incumbent)	32,374	16.4	44,758	17.3
Christopher A. Iannella (incumbent)	23,566	11.9	40,270	15.6
Rosaria Salerno (incumbent)	24,447	12.4	37,113	14.4
John A. Nucci	22,253	11.3	35,723	13.8
Bruce Bolling†	16,400	8.3	32,008	12.4
Peggy Davis-Mullen	12,860	6.5	25,658	9.9
Francis Costello	12,855	6.5	22,545	8.7
John Grady	13,512	6.8	20,375	7.9
Corbett	11,205	5.7		
Boyce Slayman	8,251	4.2		
Walsh	7,559	3.8		
Hall	5,220	2.6		
Murray	3,915	2.0		
James Klocke	2,886	1.5		

† Christopher A. Iannella died in September 1992; Bolling served the remainder of Iannella's term, as Bolling had finished fifth in the general election for four seats.

=== Democratic Party State Committeeman elections ===
1984 2nd Suffolk Democratic Party State Committeeman election
Candidates	Votes	%
Bruce C. Bolling	6,314	99.2
all others	51	0.8

1988 2nd Suffolk Democratic Party State Committeeman election
Candidates	Votes	%
Bruce C. Bolling (incumbent)	7,678	74.1
Alexander Rodriguez	1,127	10.9
Leonard M. Lee	998	9.5
Louis A. Elisa II	569	5.5

1992 2nd Suffolk Democratic Party State Committeeman election
Candidates	Votes	%
Bruce C. Bolling (incumbent)	4,386	58.2
Charles Calvin Yancey	3,153	41.8

1996 2nd Suffolk Democratic Party State Committeeman election
Candidates	Votes	%
Bruce C. Bolling (incumbent)	1,462	72.3
Juan Lopez	387	10.1
Joseph P. McLean	171	8.5

=== Mayoral election ===
1993 Boston mayoral election
Candidates	Preliminary election		General election	
Candidates	Votes	%	Votes	%
Thomas Menino (acting incumbent)	30,060	26.89	74,448	64.45
James T. Brett	25,052	22.41	41,052	35.54
Robert Rufo	22,517	20.14		
Rosaria Salerno	19,605	17.54		
Bruce Bolling	6,564	5.87		
Christopher Lydon	3,630	3.25		
Francis Roache	3,362	3.01		
Diane Moriarty	991	0.89		

Preceded by Joseph M. Tierney	President of the Boston City Council; 1986–1987	Succeeded by Christopher A. Iannella
