= 1991 Boston City Council election =

- November 5, 1991

Boston City Council elections were held on November 5, 1991. All thirteen seats (nine district representatives and four at-large members) were contested in the general election, and had also been contested in the preliminary election held on September 24, 1991.

== At-large ==
Councillors Dapper O'Neil, Christopher A. Iannella, and Rosaria Salerno were re-elected. Councillor Michael J. McCormack had announced in March 1991 that he would not seek re-election; his seat was won by former Boston School Committee member John A. Nucci.

Candidates	Preliminary election		General election	
Candidates	Votes	%	Votes	%
Dapper O'Neil (incumbent)	32,374	16.4	44,758	17.3
Christopher A. Iannella (incumbent)	23,566	11.9	40,270	15.6
Rosaria Salerno (incumbent)	24,447	12.4	37,113	14.4
John A. Nucci	22,253	11.3	35,723	13.8
Bruce Bolling†	16,400	8.3	32,008	12.4
Peggy Davis-Mullen	12,860	6.5	25,658	9.9
Francis Costello	12,855	6.5	22,545	8.7
John Grady	13,512	6.8	20,375	7.9
Corbett	11,205	5.7		
Boyce Slayman	8,251	4.2		
Walsh	7,559	3.8		
Hall	5,220	2.6		
Murray	3,915	2.0		
James Klocke	2,886	1.5		

† Christopher A. Iannella died in September 1992; Bruce Bolling served the remainder of Iannella's term, as Bolling had finished fifth in the general election for four seats.

== District 1 ==
Councillor Robert Travaglini was re-elected.

Candidates	Preliminary Election		General Election	
Candidates	Votes	%	Votes	%
Robert Travaglini	5531	64.5%	7,592	69.1%
Robert M. Cappucci	2299	26.8%	3,392	30.9%
Thomas B. Pizzi	740	8.6%		

== District 2 ==
Councillor James M. Kelly was re-elected.

Candidates	Preliminary Election		General Election	
Candidates	Votes	%	Votes	%
James M. Kelly	7,249	72.3%	9,414	72.3%
Michael Cronin	1,926	19.2%	3,608	27.7%
Richard W. Czubinski	512	5.1%		
Ali J. Fiumedoro	344	3.4%		

== District 3 ==
Councillor James E. Byrne was re-elected.

Candidates	General Election	
Candidates	Votes	%
James E. Byrne	7,922	82.9%
Jill S. Klowden	1,635	17.1%

== District 4 ==
Councillor Charles Yancey was re-elected.

Candidates	General election	
Candidates	Votes	%
Charles Yancey (incumbent)	4,742	89.5
J. R. Rucker	558	10.5

== District 5 ==
Councillor Thomas Menino was re-elected.

Candidates	Preliminary Election		General Election	
Candidates	Votes	%	Votes	%
Thomas Menino	6,784	79.5%	9,678	81.6%
Peter D. Stone	913	10.7%	2,181	18.4%
Edmund T. Burke	632	7.4%		
Gerald Bagley	203	2.4%		

== District 6 ==
Councillor Maura Hennigan was re-elected.

Candidates	General Election	
Candidates	Votes	%
Maura Hennigan	9,079	76.7%
Michael Kennedy	2,753	23.3%

== District 7 ==
Incumbent 7th district councillor Bruce Bolling ran for an at-large seat instead of seeking re-election to the district's seat. Anthony Crayton won the District 7 seat.

Candidates	Preliminary Election		General Election	
Candidates	Votes	%	Votes	%
Anthony Crayton	836	18.7%	3,129	57.5%
Roy A. Owens	974	21.8%	2,314	42.5%
Althea Garrison	703	15.7%		
Ben Haith	691	15.4%		
James A. West	666	14.9%		
Hattie Dudley	395	8.8%		
Natalie E. Carithers	211	4.7%		

== District 8 ==
Councillor David Scondras was re-elected.

Candidates	Preliminary Election		General Election	
Candidates	Votes	%	Votes	%
David Scondras	2,086	69.9%	3,208	69.9%
Glenn W. Fiscus	577	19.3%	1,380	30.1%
Michael J. Fleuette	323	10.8%		

== District 9 ==
Councillor Brian J. McLaughlin was re-elected.

Candidates	Preliminary election		General election	
Candidates	Votes	%	Votes	%
Brian J. McLaughlin (incumbent)	2,514	52.0	3,685	51.2
Cornelius K. Hurley	1,639	33.9	3,516	48.8
Curran	516	10.7		
Aramis Camps	169	3.5		

== See also ==
- List of members of the Boston City Council
- 1991 Boston mayoral election
