= 1989 Boston City Council election =

- November 7, 1989

Boston City Council elections were held on November 7, 1989. Eleven seats (seven district representatives and four at-large members) were contested in the general election, as the incumbents in districts 3 and 5 were unopposed. Nine seats (the four at-large members, and districts 1, 6, 7, 8, and 9) had also been contested in the preliminary election held on September 26, 1989.

== At-large ==
Councillors Dapper O'Neil, Christopher A. Iannella, Rosaria Salerno, and Michael J. McCormack were re-elected.

Candidates	Preliminary Election		General Election	
Candidates	Votes	%	Votes	%
Dapper O'Neil	21,764	17.2%	40,106	17.6%
Christopher A. Iannella	20,142	15.9%	38,357	16.9%
Rosaria Salerno	19,478	15.4%	35,654	15.7%
Michael J. McCormack	19,073	15.1%	31,170	13.7%
John A. Nucci	14,646	11.6%	30,466	13.4%
John N. Flanagan	13,676	10.8%	22,359	9.8%
Joseph W. Casper	10,103	8.0%	18,069	7.9%
Althea Garrison	5,042	4.0%	11,281	5.0%
Glenn Fiscus	2,365	1.9%		

== District 1 ==
Councillor Robert Travaglini was re-elected.

Candidates	Preliminary Election		General Election	
Candidates	Votes	%	Votes	%
Robert Travaglini	4,472	57.0%	7,053	62.0%
Brian Callahan	2,399	30.6%	4,322	38.0%
Martin Coughlin	618	7.9%		
Imee Jackson	363	4.6%		

== District 2 ==
Councillor James M. Kelly was re-elected.

Candidates	General Election	
Candidates	Votes	%
James M. Kelly	7,429	85.9%
Ali J. Fiumedoro	1,221	14.1%

== District 3 ==
Councillor James E. Byrne ran unopposed and was re-elected.

== District 4 ==
Councillor Charles Yancey was re-elected.

Candidates	General election	
Candidates	Votes	%
Charles Yancey (incumbent)	3,215	87.9
J. R. Rucker	442	12.1

== District 5 ==
Councillor Thomas Menino ran unopposed and was re-elected.

== District 6 ==
Councillor Maura Hennigan was re-elected.

Candidates	Preliminary Election		General Election	
Candidates	Votes	%	Votes	%
Maura Hennigan	4,445	52.9%	7,753	57.7%
Vincent G. Mannering	3,805	45.3%	5,678	42.3%
Nels J'Anthony	156	1.9%		

== District 7 ==
Councillor Bruce Bolling was re-elected.

Candidates	Preliminary election		General election	
Candidates	Votes	%	Votes	%
Bruce Bolling (incumbent)	998	57.1	2,330	60.1
Roy A. Owens	391	22.4	1,547	39.9
Michael Long	358	20.5		

== District 8 ==
Councillor David Scondras was re-elected.

Candidates	Preliminary Election		General Election	
Candidates	Votes	%	Votes	%
David Scondras	1,524	75.9%	2,913	71.8%
Benjamin H. Morehead	217	10.8%	1,146	28.2%
Oscar T. Brookins	153	7.6%		
Marilyn Stacy Huynh	111	5.5%		

== District 9 ==
Councillor Brian J. McLaughlin was re-elected.

Candidates	Preliminary Election		General Election	
Candidates	Votes	%	Votes	%
Brian J. McLaughlin	2,110	40.7%	4,387	60.6%
Judith Bracken	1,597	30.8%	2,848	39.4%
Cornelius K. Hurley	1,330	25.6%		
Aramis Camps	150	2.9%		

== See also ==
- List of members of the Boston City Council
