= 1987 Boston City Council election =

- November 3, 1987

Boston City Council elections were held on November 3, 1987. Eleven seats (seven district representatives and four at-large members) were contested in the general election, as the incumbents in districts 3 and 6 were unopposed. Seven seats (the four at-large members, and districts 1, 8, and 9) had also been contested in the preliminary election held on September 22, 1987.

== At-large ==
Councillors Dapper O'Neil, Christopher A. Iannella, and Michael J. McCormack were re-elected. Councillor Joseph M. Tierney did not seek re-election, as he ran for Mayor of Boston; he was defeated by incumbent Raymond Flynn in the general election. Council newcomer Rosaria Salerno won election to an at-large seat.

| Candidates | Preliminary election | | General election | |
| Candidates | Votes | % | Votes | % |
|---|---|---|---|---|
| Dapper O'Neil (incumbent) | 29,052 | 16.3 | 47,817 | 17.0 |
| Christopher A. Iannella (incumbent) | 23,906 | 13.4 | 45,472 | 16.1 |
| Rosaria Salerno | 19,346 | 10.8 | 39,089 | 13.9 |
| Michael J. McCormack (incumbent) | 16,793 | 9.4 | 36,326 | 12.9 |
| Joseph W. Casper | 15,694 | 8.8 | 32,548 | 11.5 |
| Frederick C. Langone | 19,521 | 10.9 | 30,447 | 10.8 |
| Michael W. Kane | 13,678 | 10.8 | 27,573 | 9.8 |
| Stephen J. Murphy | 13,309 | 7.4 | 22,744 | 8.1 |
| Kevin A. McCluskey | 11,431 | 6.4 | | |
| Althea Garrison | 6,669 | 3.7 | | |
| Edward T. Kelley | 5,123 | 2.9 | | |
| David J. McKay | 4,198 | 2.3 | | |

== District 1 ==
Councillor Robert Travaglini was re-elected.

| Candidates | Preliminary election | | General election | |
| Candidates | Votes | % | Votes | % |
|---|---|---|---|---|
| Robert Travaglini (incumbent) | 5,680 | 54.5 | 7,977 | 61.6 |
| Maria DiLibero | 3,115 | 29.9 | 4,976 | 38.4 |
| Anthony Picarello | 1,629 | 15.6 | | |

== District 2 ==
Councillor James M. Kelly was re-elected.

| Candidates | General election | |
| Candidates | Votes | % |
|---|---|---|
| James M. Kelly (incumbent) | 10,413 | 86.7 |
| Ali J. Fiumedoro | 1,602 | 13.3 |

== District 3 ==
Councillor James E. Byrne ran unopposed and was re-elected.

== District 4 ==
Councillor Charles Yancey was re-elected.

| Candidates | General election | |
| Candidates | Votes | % |
|---|---|---|
| Charles Yancey (incumbent) | 4,828 | 80.1 |
| Arthur Williams | 1,196 | 19.9 |

== District 5 ==
Councillor Thomas Menino was re-elected.

| Candidates | General election | |
| Candidates | Votes | % |
|---|---|---|
| Thomas Menino (incumbent) | 10,437 | 87.0 |
| Gerald Bagley | 1,556 | 13.0 |

== District 6 ==
Councillor Maura Hennigan ran unopposed and was re-elected.

== District 7 ==
Councillor Bruce Bolling was re-elected.

| Candidates | General election | |
| Candidates | Votes | % |
|---|---|---|
| Bruce Bolling (incumbent) | 4,264 | 70.3 |
| Roy A. Owens | 1,803 | 29.7 |

== District 8 ==
Councillor David Scondras was re-elected.

| Candidates | Preliminary election | | General election | |
| Candidates | Votes | % | Votes | % |
|---|---|---|---|---|
| David Scondras (incumbent) | 2,158 | 69.9 | 3,386 | 63.6 |
| Glenn Fiscus | 537 | 17.4 | 1,942 | 36.4 |
| Jack E. Molesworth | 393 | 12.7 | | |

== District 9 ==
Councillor Brian J. McLaughlin was re-elected, with his narrow victory confirmed by a recount.

| Candidates | Preliminary election | | General election | | Recount | |
| Candidates | Votes | % | Votes | % | Votes | % |
|---|---|---|---|---|---|---|
| Brian J. McLaughlin (incumbent) | 2,090 | 36.0 | 4,627 | 50.7 | 4,722 | 50.8 |
| Richard M. Izzo | 2,097 | 36.1 | 4,506 | 49.3 | 4,575 | 49.2 |
| Paul F. Creighton | 1,265 | 4.4 | | | | |
| Brian J. Rielly | 255 | 1.8 | | | | |
| Aramis Camps | 102 | 1.8% | | | | |

== See also ==
- List of members of the Boston City Council
- 1987 Boston mayoral election
