= 1985 Boston City Council election =

- November 5, 1985

Boston City Council elections were held on November 5, 1985. Eleven seats (seven district representatives and four at-large members) were contested in the general election, as the incumbents in districts 4 and 5 were unopposed. Nine seats (the four at-large members, and districts 1, 2, 7, 8, and 9) had also been contested in the preliminary election held on September 10, 1985.

== At-large ==
Councillors Dapper O'Neil, Joseph M. Tierney, Christopher A. Iannella, and Michael J. McCormack were re-elected.

Candidates	Preliminary election		General election	
Candidates	Votes	%	Votes	%
Dapper O'Neil (incumbent)	22,792	19.1	36,686	18.8
Joseph M. Tierney (incumbent)	17,014	14.3	34,427	17.6
Christopher A. Iannella (incumbent)	19,183	16.1	33,883	17.3
Michael J. McCormack (incumbent)	17,329	14.5	27,976	14.3
Frederick C. Langone	16,900	14.2	26,365	13.5
Michael W. Kane	10,018	8.4	17,175	8.8
Willie Mae Allen	6,268	5.3	12,533	6.4
Althea Garrison	3,565	3.0	6,402	3.3
Kenneth C. Davis	2,130	1.8		
John P. Scialdone	1,588	1.3		
Richard A. Black	972	0.8		
Little L. Pittman	808	0.7		
Edward P. Malik	723	0.6		

== District 1 ==
Councillor Robert Travaglini was re-elected.

Candidates	Preliminary election		General election	
Candidates	Votes	%	Votes	%
Robert Travaglini (incumbent)	3,983	78.6	5,440	15.6
Robert C. Jordan	626	12.4	1,004	15.6
Joseph Sablone	459	9.1		

== District 2 ==
Councillor James M. Kelly was re-elected.

Candidates	Preliminary election		General election	
Candidates	Votes	%	Votes	%
James M. Kelly (incumbent)	4,836	62.2	7,028	62.4
Bill Linehan	2,701	34.7	4,242	37.6
Ali J. Fiumedoro	244	3.1		

== District 3 ==
Councillor James E. Byrne was re-elected.

Candidates	General election	
Candidates	Votes	%
James E. Byrne (incumbent)	5,828	86.2
Arthur G. Murphy	935	13.8

== District 4 ==
Councillor Charles Yancey ran unopposed and was re-elected.

Candidates	General election	
Candidates	Votes	%
Charles Yancey (incumbent)	1,934	100

== District 5 ==
Councillor Thomas Menino ran unopposed and was re-elected.

Candidates	General election	
Candidates	Votes	%
Thomas Menino (incumbent)	5,745	100

== District 6 ==
Councillor Maura Hennigan was re-elected.

Candidates	General election	
Candidates	Votes	%
Maura Hennigan (incumbent)	6,143	86.4
Richard K. Whitney	964	13.6

== District 7 ==
Councillor Bruce Bolling was re-elected.

Candidates	Preliminary election		General election	
Candidates	Votes	%	Votes	%
Bruce Bolling (incumbent)	1,505	70.3	2,386	68.0
Roy A. Owens	448	20.9	1,121	32.0
Robert Polk	108	5.0		
Charles H. Durant	80	3.7		

== District 8 ==
Councillor David Scondras was re-elected.

Candidates	Preliminary election		General election	
Candidates	Votes	%	Votes	%
David Scondras	2,472	67.4	3,195	64.6
Judy Porteus	538	14.7	1,750	35.4
Glenn Fiscus	457	12.5		
Leslie F. Payne	202	5.5		

== District 9 ==
Councillor Brian J. McLaughlin was re-elected.

Candidates	Preliminary election		General election	
Candidates	Votes	%	Votes	%
Brian J. McLaughlin (incumbent)	2,275	45.4	4,192	55.6
Richard M. Izzo	1,869	37.3	3,353	44.4
John F. Melia	784	15.6		
Aramis Camps	82	1.6		

== See also ==
- List of members of the Boston City Council
