= 1973 Boston City Council election =

The Boston City Council election was held on November 6, 1973, with preliminary elections on September 25, 1973.

== Results ==
1973 Boston City Council election
Candidates	Preliminary election		General election	
Candidates	Votes	%	Votes	%
Louise Day Hicks	26,509	10.41	44,219	9.99
Christopher A. Iannella (incumbent)	23,707	9.31	42,226	9.54
Lawrence S. DiCara (incumbent)	23,138	9.09	40,426	9.13
Albert L. O'Neil (incumbent)	23,935	9.40	38,655	8.73
Joseph M. Tierney (incumbent)	19,428	7.63	33,200	7.50
Gerald F. O'Leary (incumbent)	16,822	6.61	33,043	7.46
Frederick C. Langone	19,033	7.47	31,867	7.20
James Michael Connolly	12,441	4.89	30,770	6.95
Patrick F. McDonough (incumbent)	16,817	6.60	29,650	6.70
Thomas A. Sullivan	11,197	4.40	23,258	5.25
Thomas M. Connolly Jr.	9,300	3.65	18,257	4.12
Lena Saunders	5,955	2.34	16,526	3.73
Anthony F. DeFeo	6,359	2.50	12,899	2.91
Kenneth G. Whelan	6,683	2.62	12,267	2.77
John E. Powers Jr.	6,350	2.49	10,742	2.43
James V. McManus	4,940	1.94	9,737	2.20
Martin J. Ridge	5,825	2.29	8,138	1.84
Robert P. Kane	4,696	1.84	6,887	1.56
William J. Costello	4,648	1.83		
Debra Byrne	3,632	1.43		
Jill A. LeCompte	3,208	1.26		
