= 1983 Boston City Council election =

- November 15, 1983

Boston City Council elections were held on November 15, 1983, with preliminary elections on October 11, 1983. This election transitioned the Council from having 9 members (all at-large) to having 13 members (9 district representatives and 4 at-large). All 13 seats were contested in both the preliminary and general election.

== Incumbents ==
Each of the nine incumbent at-large councillors ran for Boston public office.

Name	Position contested for	Result
Bruce Bolling	Councillor, District 7	won
Raymond Flynn	Mayor of Boston	won
Maura Hennigan	Councillor, District 6	won
Christopher A. Iannella	Councillor at-large	elected
Frederick C. Langone	Mayor of Boston	lost, 6th
Michael J. McCormack	Councillor at-large	elected
Terence P. McDermott	Councillor at-large	lost, 5th
Dapper O'Neil	Councillor at-large	elected
Joseph M. Tierney	Councillor at-large	elected

== At-large ==
In the preliminary election, ten names appeared on the ballot, with voters able to choose four; the top eight vote-getters then appeared on the ballot in the general election.

Voters in the general election could select four of the eight final candidates; Councillors McCormack, Iannella, Tierney, and O'Neil received the most votes, so were re-elected and filled the four at-large seats, while Councillor McDermott finished fifth and was not re-elected.

Candidates	Preliminary election		General election	
Candidates	Votes	%	Votes	%
Michael J. McCormack (incumbent)	52,315	12.3	87,143	16.0
Christopher A. Iannella (incumbent)	66,647	15.6	85,204	15.7
Joseph M. Tierney (incumbent)	62,850	14.7	82,600	15.2
Dapper O'Neil (incumbent)	64,410	15.1	79,086	14.6
Terence P. McDermott (incumbent)	61,436	14.4	77,096	14.2
Jean Sullivan McKeigue	48,265	11.3	73,064	13.4
Willie Mae Allen	21,369	5.0	32,556	6.0
Althea Garrison	19,908	4.7	26,564	4.9
Joseph Mirisola	14,914	3.5		
Leslie F. Payne	14,199	3.3		

== District 1 ==
Robert Travaglini was elected.

Candidates	Preliminary election		General election	
Candidates	Votes	%	Votes	%
Robert Travaglini	5,001	26.8	11,663	53.0
Diane J. Modica	3,704	19.9	10,343	47.0
Robert M. Cappucci	3,444	18.5		
Michael J. Reardon	3,081	16.5		
Joseph V. Cinseruli	1,999	10.7		
Neil P. Brennan	773	4.1		
Joseph Sablone	372	2.0		
Carl J. Salvi Jr.	272	1.5		

== District 2 ==
James M. Kelly was elected.

Candidates	Preliminary election		General election	
Candidates	Votes	%	Votes	%
James M. Kelly	8,615	41.9	11,815	51.7
Michael Taylor	6,284	30.5	11,026	48.3
Christopher F. Hayes	4,400	21.4		
William P. Foley	718	3.5		
Stephen M. Palmer	281	1.4		
Ali J. Fiumedoro	272	1.3		

== District 3 ==
James E. Byrne was elected.

Candidates	Preliminary election		General election	
Candidates	Votes	%	Votes	%
James E. Byrne	5,231	25.7	11,544	50.5
John E. Garland	5,319	26.2	11,295	49.5
Stephen M. Cidlevich	3,944	19.4		
Richard Livingston	2,339	11.5		
Carol Nee Geyer	2,145	10.6		
Walter R. Campbell	997	4.9		
Debra Gelber	347	1.7		

== District 4 ==
Charles Yancey was elected.

Candidates	Preliminary election		General election	
Candidates	Votes	%	Votes	%
Charles Yancey	4,239	18.47	7,898	51.7
Bill Owens Jr.	4,405	17.21	7,364	48.07
Gerald Anderson	1,889	14.4		
Locksley H. Bryan	980	7.5		
Benjamin F. Thompson	601	4.6		
Carter D. Kimbrel	469	3.6		
Bobby J. Wallace	254	1.9		
Arthur Williams	241	1.8		

== District 5 ==
Thomas Menino was elected.

Candidates	Preliminary election		General election	
Candidates	Votes	%	Votes	%
Thomas Menino	11,375	57.8	17,554	74.7
Richard E. Kenney	3,126	15.9	5,945	25.3
William G. Broderick	3,123	15.9		
Robert MacGregor	1,124	5.7		
Constance L. Brown	467	2.4		
George L. Richmond	461	2.3		

== District 6 ==
At-large councillor Maura Hennigan was elected.

Candidates	Preliminary election		General election	
Candidates	Votes	%	Votes	%
Maura Hennigan (at-large incumbent)	10,772	52.6	14,390	59.8
Francis X. Coppinger	6,557	32.0	9,654	40.2
Edmund McNamara	3139	15.3		

== District 7 ==
At-large councillor Bruce Bolling was elected.

Candidates	Preliminary election		General election	
Candidates	Votes	%	Votes	%
Bruce Bolling (at-large incumbent)	7,556	59.1	9,049	63.9
Elizabeth "Betty" Jones	1,907	14.9	5,121	36.1
Ben Haith	1,315	10.3		
Roy A. Owens	1.146	9.0		
Steven A. Wise	567	4.4		
James Joseph	302	2.4		

== District 8 ==
David Scondras was elected, becoming the first openly gay Boston City Council member.

Candidates	Preliminary election		General election	
Candidates	Votes	%	Votes	%
David Scondras	3,720	30.6	7,207	50.4
Mark Roosevelt	4,136	34.0	7,104	49.6
Dennis A. Quilty	3,150	25.9		
Eugenie Beal	1,165	9.6		

== District 9 ==
Brian J. McLaughlin was elected.

Candidates	Preliminary election		General election	
Candidates	Votes	%	Votes	%
Brian J. McLaughlin	2,969	20.5	9,071	53.8
Helene Solomon	3,470	24.0	7,782	46.2
Richard M. Izzo	2,489	17.2		
John F. Melia	2,456	17.0		
Joseph H. Hogan Jr.	1,451	10.0		
Jerome P. MacDonald	917	7.3		
George Franklin	534	3.7		
Jean Farrell	162	1.1		

== See also ==
- List of members of the Boston City Council
- 1983 Boston mayoral election
