= Iannella =

Iannella is a surname. Notable people with the surname include:

- Christopher A. Iannella (1913–1992), American politician
- Christopher Iannella Jr. (born 1952), American politician
- Monique Iannella (born 1996), Australian footballer
- Richard P. Iannella, American politician
- Sandy Iannella (born 1987), Italian footballer
