= 1977 Boston City Council election =

- November 8, 1977

The Boston City Council election was held on November 8, 1977, with preliminary elections on September 27, 1977.

== Candidates ==
All nine incumbents (James Michael Connolly, Lawrence DiCara, Louise Day Hicks, Christopher A. Iannella, John J. Kerrigan, Frederick C. Langone, Patrick F. McDonough, Dapper O'Neil, and Joseph M. Tierney) ran for reelection.

=== Elected ===
- James Michael Connolly, member of the Boston City Council since 1974.
- Lawrence DiCara, member of the Boston City Council since 1972.
- Raymond Flynn, member of the Massachusetts House of Representatives since 1971.
- Christopher A. Iannella, member of the Boston City Council since 1970. Previously served on the council from 1958 to 1968.
- Frederick C. Langone, member of the Boston City Council since 1973, previously served from 1964 to 1971 and in 1961.
- Patrick F. McDonough, member of the Boston City Council since 1972. Previously served on the council from 1956 to 1964 and 1966 to 1970.
- Dapper O'Neil, member of the Boston City Council since 1971.
- Rosemarie E. Sansone, manager of the state Equal Rights Amendment campaign.
- Joseph M. Tierney, member of the Boston City Council since 1972.

=== Lost in general election ===
- Lawrence E. Blacke, attorney.
- Bruce Bolling, manager of the Franklin Field Little City Hall.
- Paul J. Ellison, member of the Boston School Committee from 1972 to 1976. Was in jail for larceny of city funds during the election.
- Stephen C. Farrell, former city youth worker and Little City Hall employee.
- Louise Day Hicks, member of the Boston City Council since 1974 and previously from 1970 to 1971. Former member of the United States House of Representatives (1971–1973) and Boston School Committee (1961–1970).
- John J. Kerrigan, member of the Boston City Council since 1976 and the Boston School Committee from 1968 to 1976.
- Gerard P. McHale, administrative assistant to the Boston Office of Public Facilities since 1976. Former assistant director for the Boston Office of Personnel (1974 to 1976).
- Gerald O'Leary, member of the Boston City Council from 1968 to 1976 and the Massachusetts House of Representatives from 1965 to 1969.
- Arnett L. Waters, deputy manpower director for Action for Boston Community Development.

=== Eliminated in preliminary election ===
- Elizabeth Buckley, realtor and theater owner.
- John T. Cuddy, job developer for Oficina Hispana, Vietnam veteran, and UMass-Boston student.
- William T. Donovan, engineering inspector.
- George R. Geller, co-chairman of the U.S. Labor Party.
- Norma Walsh Gramer, neighborhood activist.
- Polly Jane Halfkenny, communist.
- Richard Hird, accountant.
- Diane Jacobs, member of the Socialist Workers Party.
- Harold L. O’Brien, contractor.
- Robert Whitey McGrail, restaurant owner and George Wallace delegate to the 1976 Democratic National Convention.
- Celia M. Sniffin, hospital data analysts and rent control activist.
- James J. Tobin, legal counsel for the Boston Gas Company.

== Results ==
| Candidates | Preliminary election | | General election | |
| Candidates | Votes | % | Votes | % |
|---|---|---|---|---|
| James Michael Connolly (incumbent) | 22,212 | 5.92 | 37,479 | 7.97 |
| Raymond Flynn | 19,248 | 2.96 | 35,757 | 7.60 |
| Christopher A. Iannella (incumbent) | 21,577 | 6.64 | 35,682 | 7.59 |
| Dapper O'Neil (incumbent) | 20,875 | 6.42 | 35,543 | 7.56 |
| Lawrence DiCara (incumbent) | 19,048 | 5.86 | 32,232 | 6.85 |
| Joseph M. Tierney (incumbent) | 17,500 | 5.39 | 31,913 | 6.79 |
| Rosemarie Sansone | 12,954 | 3.99 | 30,531 | 6.49 |
| Frederick C. Langone (incumbent) | 15,156 | 4.66 | 30,268 | 6.44 |
| Patrick F. McDonough (incumbent) | 15,868 | 4.88 | 30,205 | 6.44 |
| Louise Day Hicks (incumbent) | 19,862 | 6.11 | 30,058 | 6.39 |
| Gerald O'Leary | 14,979 | 4.61 | 23,868 | 5.08 |
| Gerard P. McHale | 12,753 | 3.92 | 20,610 | 4.38 |
| John J. Kerrigan (incumbent) | 11,810 | 3.63 | 20,045 | .4.26 |
| Arnett L. Waters | 10,589 | 3.26 | 18,109 | 3.85 |
| Lawrence E. Blacke | 9,801 | 3.02 | 16,899 | 3.59 |
| Bruce Bolling | 8,634 | 2.66 | 15,518 | 3.30 |
| Stephen C. Farrell | 8,505 | 2.62 | 13,980 | 2.97 |
| Paul J. Ellison | 7,919 | 2.22 | 11,542 | 2.45 |
| William T. Donovan | 7,198 | 2.22 | | |
| Elizabeth Buckley | 6,886 | 2.12 | | |
| Robert Whitey McGrail | 6,740 | 1.03 | | |
| Harold L. O’Brien | 5,869 | 1.81 | | |
| James J. Tobin | 4,907 | 1.51 | | |
| Polly Jane Halfkenny | 4,380 | 1.35 | | |
| John T. Cuddy | 4,288 | 1.32 | | |
| Celia M. Sniffin | 3,965 | 1.22 | | |
| Diane Jacobs | 3,827 | 1.18 | | |
| Norma Walsh Gramer | 3,559 | 1.10 | | |
| Richard Hird | 2,365 | 0.73 | | |
| George R. Geller | 1,675 | 0.52 | | |
| scattering | 1 | 0.00 | 4 | 0.00 |
