= Michael J. McCormack =

American politician (born 1946)

At-large member of the Boston City Council
- In office 1982–1991
- Succeeded by: John A. Nucci

Personal details
- Born: ca.1946 Boston
- Education: B.S. UMass Boston; J.D. Suffolk University
- Occupation: Attorney

Michael J. McCormack (born ca.1946) is a former member of the Boston City Council, having held an at-large seat from 1982 through 1991.

== Career ==
McCormack was first elected to the City Council in November 1981 (when the council consisted of nine members, all at-large) and was subsequently re-elected to four two-year terms (when the council consisted of four at-large members and nine district representatives). He announced in March 1991 that he would not seek re-election; his seat was won by former Boston School Committee member John A. Nucci in the November 1991 election.

A native of the Allston–Brighton neighborhood of Boston, McCormack graduated from Catholic Memorial High School in West Roxbury. McCormack earned a bachelor's degree in education from the University of Massachusetts Boston in 1969, and a Juris Doctor degree from Suffolk University in 1972. He served as an Assistant Attorney General and as a Special Assistant Attorney General for the Commonwealth of Massachusetts. As of February 2018, he practices for the Boston law firm McCormack Suny LLC.

== Personal life ==
In 1983, Michael married his wife, Sheila, in Vail, Colorado. Together they have a daughter, Hallie, and a son, Conor.

== See also ==
- Boston City Council election, 1983
- Boston City Council election, 1985
- Boston City Council election, 1987
- Boston City Council election, 1989
