= Joyce Ferriabough Bolling =

Joyce Ferriabough Bolling is a Boston Herald journalist and Democratic Party strategist.

In 2011, Bolling was honored with the "Woman of Courage" Award by the Massachusetts Women's Political Caucus alongside former Speaker of the House Nancy Pelosi, human rights activist Rubina Bhatti, and former Secretary of Labor Alexis Herman. In 2023, she was recognized as one of "Boston’s most admired, beloved, and successful Black Women leaders" by the Black Women Lead project. In 2024, she was nominated by State Senator Liz Miranda and inducted into the Class of 2024 Commonwealth Heroines of Massachusetts.

In collaboration with Boston City Councilman Bruce Bolling, Joyce Bolling passed Boston's "linkage law," conditioning approval of real estate projects on construction of affordable housing. Following this work, the pair married and remained together until Bruce's death in September 2012.
