= Brian J. McLaughlin =

American politician

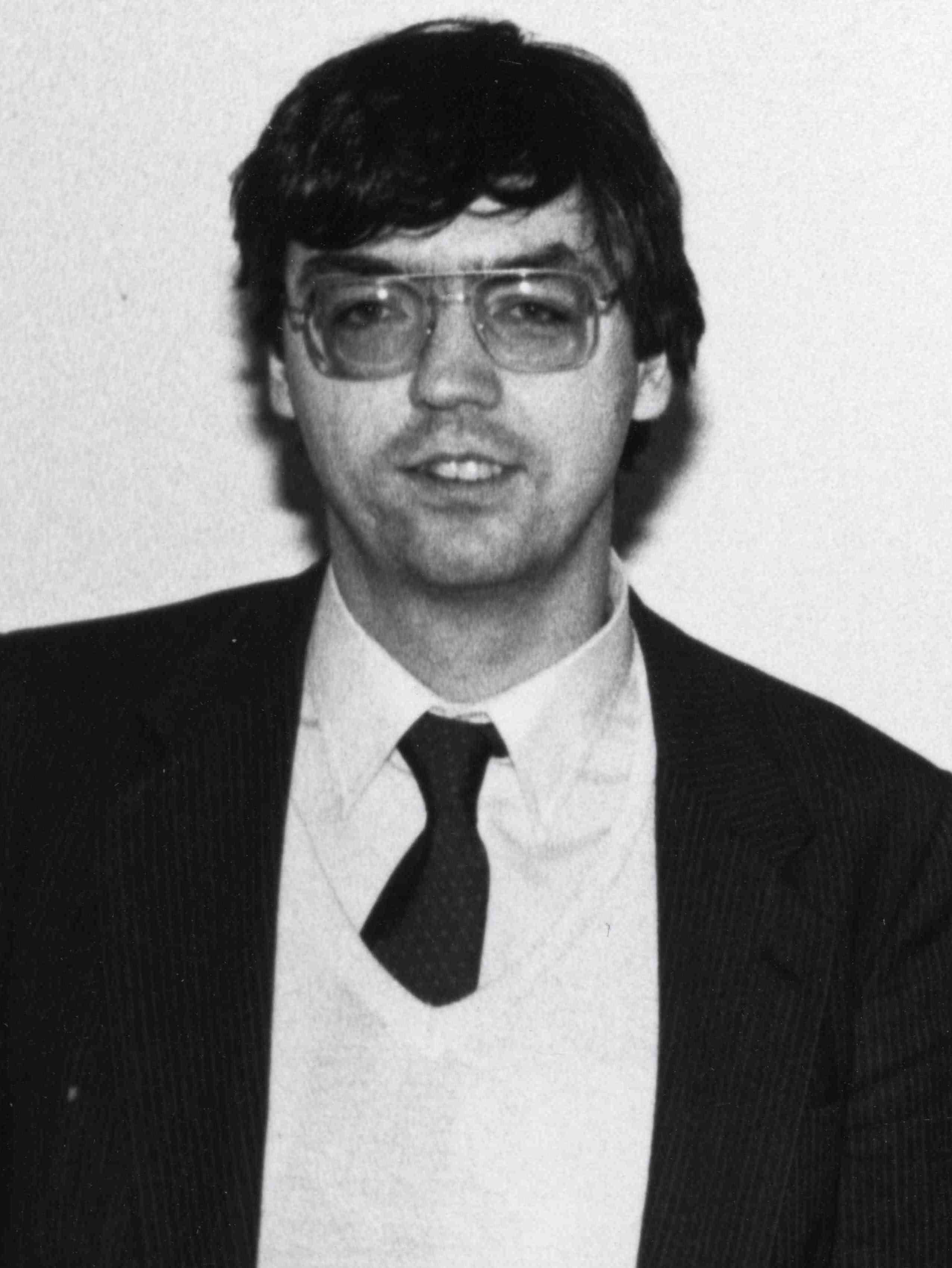
- McLaughlin (ca.1984–1987)

Member of the Boston City Council for District 9
- In office 1984–1995
- Preceded by: district created
- Succeeded by: Brian Honan

Personal details
- Born: ca.1957
- Education: Stonehill College

Brian J. McLaughlin (born ca.1957) is a former member of the Boston City Council, having held the District 9 seat from 1984 through 1995.

== Career ==
McLaughlin graduated from Stonehill College in Easton, Massachusetts, and before running for office was a community organizer, mainly on housing issues.

McLaughlin was first elected to the City Council in November 1983, representing District 9 (Allston–Brighton). He was subsequently re-elected five times, each term being for two years. His November 1987 victory was quite narrow; after finishing second in the preliminary election, McLaughlin won the general election by only 121 votes (4,627 to 4,506), with a recount later confirming his win. His November 1993 re-election also had to be confirmed by a recount. During his time on the council, McLaughlin was a strong advocate of rent control.

In March 1995, McLaughlin announced that he would not seek re-election. He later became executive secretary of the Boston Parks and Recreation Commission.

== See also ==
- Boston City Council election, 1983
- Boston City Council election, 1985
- Boston City Council election, 1987
- Boston City Council election, 1989
- Boston City Council election, 1991
- Boston City Council election, 1993
