= Bill Linehan =

American politician

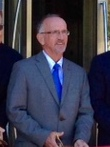
- Linehan in 2014

President of the Boston City Council
- In office January 2014 – January 2016
- Preceded by: Stephen J. Murphy
- Succeeded by: Michelle Wu

Member of the Boston City Council from District 2
- In office May 29, 2007 – October 18, 2017
- Preceded by: James M. Kelly
- Succeeded by: Ed Flynn

Personal details
- Born: South Boston, Massachusetts

William P. Linehan is an American politician who was a member and president of the Boston City Council in Massachusetts. He represented District 2, which contained parts of Downtown Boston, the South End, South Boston and Chinatown. For the 2014–15 council term, Linehan served as its president. He was considered to be one of the more conservative members of the council. Linehan's district included Downtown Boston, the South End, South Boston and Chinatown. While on the council, Linehan was regarded as one of the most important "southie" (South Boston) politicians.

Linehan chaired the city council's post-2010 United States Census redistricting process. His proposed map, which would have split Chinatown between two separate City Council electoral districts, faced opposition. Critics accused Linehan of dividing Chinatown's voters into two districts in an effort to benefit his own future re-election prospects, as the two Chinatown wards he removed from his own district had voted strongly against him in previous elections. While the map was adopted by the council, it was vetoed by Mayor Thomas Menino. The council later adopted a map featuring amendments made by Councilor Tito Jackson.

Linehan opposed the rental inspection ordinance passed in 2012, which created a requirement that residential rental units be inspected every five years, with the owners of "problem properties" receiving fines if added to a "chronic offender registry". He subsequently made an unsuccessful effort to repeal it. In 2014 and 2015, he led efforts to increase the annual wages paid to council members. Linehan originally sought a 29% wage hike to $112,500. Ultimately, a 20% increase to $105,000 was enacted. In 2013, Linehan proposed a home rule petition that would have seen Boston ask the state legislature to allow it to impose a 6.25% sales tax on alcoholic beverage purchases at stores with licenses permitting "off-premise" consumption of alcohol sold. He argued that such a tax could fund programs to combat substance abuse. In 2016, he introduced legislation for a similar 2% sales tax to raise funds for programs and services to combat substance abuse, but the council voted against it 10–3. In 2013, Linehan proposed an ordinance that would have raised the citation given for public smoking of cannabis in public to $200. Also in 2013, Linehan was the only member of the Boston City Council to vote against advancing a home rule petition authored by Councilor Ayanna Pressley requesting that the state cede its control over the number of liquor licenses in Boston to the Boston Licensing Board.

== Early life and career ==
Linehan was born in Boston and is the oldest of eight children. He has been active in politics since his teenage years. He graduated magna cum laude from the University of Massachusetts Boston. Before his election to the city council, Linehan served as the Director of Operations for the City of Boston's Parks Department and later worked in Mayor Thomas Menino's administration for six years as the Special Assistant to the Chief Operating Officer of the City of Boston for six years.

== Boston City Council ==
Linehan served on the Boston City Council from 2007 through 2017. He was president of the council in 2014 and 2015.

During a portion of his tenure, Linehan served as the chair of the Committee on Economic Development and Planning.

=== Elections ===
Linehan was first elected to the City Council via a special election in May 2007, following the death of Councillor James M. Kelly. He was reelected five times, until announcing in February 2017 that he would not run in the November 2017 election. He served president of the council in 2014 and 2015.

Linehan's district included Downtown Boston, the South End, South Boston and Chinatown. In both his 2011 and 2013 elections, he only narrowly defeated challenges from Suzanne Lee. These races against a female Asian American challenger from the Chinatown portion of his district were described by Benjamin Swasey of WBUR as having been viewed as contests pitting, "'old Boston' politics against a new, more diverse brand" as well as races that were, "representative of changes in the district itself."

=== First term (2007) and second term (2008–09) ===
Linehan was sworn-in for his first (partial) term on the council on May 29, 2007. Linehan was re-elected in November 2007 to a full term beginning in January 2008.

In late-2008, Linehan voiced his opposition to the Massachusetts Turnpike board's proposal to end discounts on tolls for residents of the Charlestown, North End, East Boston, and South Boston residents. He argued that the discontinuation of the discounts would be punitive towards residents of the neighborhoods that had been most impacted by negative construction impacts during the fifteen years of the Big Dig.

=== Third term (2010–11) ===
Linehan was re-elected in November 2009 for a third term beginning in January 2010.

Linehan served as chair of the post-2010 United States census redistricting process. He faced criticism over a proposal he made to split Chinatown between two separate City Council electoral districts. Critics accused him of leveraging his influence in the process to draw a map that would increase his own electoral fortunes, as this proposal would have removed from his district two Chinatown wards that had voted strongly against him in previous city council elections. The map that Linehan proposed was adopted by the City Council, but vetoed by Mayor Thomas Menino. After a failed second attempt, the City Council later approved a third map with amendments by City Councilor Tito Jackson, which Mayor Menino then signed.

=== Fourth term (2012–13) ===
Connolly was re-elected in November 2011 for a fourth term beginning in January 2012.

Linehan opposed the rental inspection ordinance passed in 2012. The ordinance created a requirement that residential rental units be inspected every five years, with the owners of "problem properties" receiving $300 fines if added to a "chronic offender registry". The ordinance was strongly opposed by many Boston landlords, but was passed in the council by a vote of 9-4 vote and signed into law by Mayor Thomas Menino.

In 2013, Linehan proposed a home rule petition that would have seen Boston ask the state legislature to allow it to impose a 6.25% sales tax on alcoholic beverage purchases at stores with licenses permitting "off-premise" consumption of alcohol sold. He argued that such a tax could fund programs to combat substance abuse. Also in 2013, Linehan proposed legislation to raise the citation given for public smoking of cannabis in public to $200. Linehan cited his objections to people consuming cannabis in public parks, considering it a public safety concern. He voiced particular concern about cannabis use in Boston Common. That year, he was one of five Boston city councilors that voted against a successful City Council rule change that effectively allowed for the City Council to effectively discharge from committee a bill that was being stalled in committee. In December of that year, Linehan was the only member of the Boston City Council to vote against advancing a home rule petition authored by Councilor Ayanna Pressley requesting that the state cede its control over the number of liquor licenses in Boston to the Boston Licensing Board.

=== Fifth term and council presidency (2014–15) ===
Linehan was re-elected in November 2013 for a fifth term beginning in January 2014.

==== Election as council president ====
At the start of his fifth term, Linehan was elected by his fellow councilors to serve as Boston City Council president. At the time, Linehan was regarded to be the council's most conservative member, and as representative of "old Boston" politics.

After the city council election, liberal councilor Matt O'Malley had been initially able to gather the backing of six councilors, one shy of the majority support he would need for election as council president. Critically, councilor-elect Michelle Wu declined to commit her support to him, despite being part of the incoming council's liberal wing that had largely gotten behind O'Malley's candidacy. Councilor-elect Timothy McCarthy (who had initially been among the six backing O'Malley) withdrew his backing from O'Malley, and gave his support to Linehan, securing Linehan the backing of a majority of councilors. Despite his conservative leanings, Linehan was soon able to also able to secure the additional backing of the progressive-leaning Wu, who faced backlash from some of her voters for supporting the conservative-leaning Linehan. In her backing of Linehan's bid for council president, Wu cited her belief that he would be the most effective at running the City Council; and also cited her agreement with several pledges he made, including decentralizing power away from the council president's office, empowering committee chairs, and reorganizing the central staff of the council. Wu's support was important to securing Linehan his election. With O'Malley unable to secure majority support, a different liberal councilor, Tito Jackson, soon jumped into the fray. Jackson, however, was also unsuccessful in his attempt to secure the backing of a majority of councilors. Days before the first meeting of the newly-elected council, the president of the local NAACP chapter sent a mass email urging Bostonians to encourage councilors to support Pressley for council president, and shortly before the council vote, Pressley launched a last-minute bid for the position. However, none of Linehan's pledged supporters broke from him, and he prevailed over Pressley.

Councilors who voted for Linehan were Linehan himself, Wu, McCarthy, Frank Baker, Mark Ciommo, Michael F. Flaherty, Salvatore LaMattina, and Stephen J. Murphy. Those who voted for Pressley were Pressley herself, Jackson, O'Malley, Charles Yancey, and Josh Zakim.

==== Effort to increase council salaries and pensions ====
During his fifth term, Linehan led an extended push to raise the salaries and pensions for city councilors, an effort which was met with resistance from Mayor Marty Walsh and several members of the council. On September 11, 2014, Linehan floated the idea of a "moderate increase" in each councilor's annual wage from $87,500 potentially to $108,500. On September 15, Linehan introduced a proposed ordnance to increase councilor to $112,500 an increase of 29% ($25,000). The Massachusetts State Ethics Commission and local political news commentators voiced concerns against the proposed council raise. On October 7, Mayor Walsh pledged that he would veto the ordinance if it were passed by the council. Linehan adjusted his proposal, and on October 15 Linehan and fellow city councilor Stephen J. Murphy authored an ordinance that would have substantially increased the salaries and pensions of members of the Boston City Council, but had a slightly-smaller wage increase than Linehan's proposal. The new ordinance proposal would raise by $20,000 to $107,500. This new ordinance passed the council 9–4, with the only votes against it coming from Councilors Pressley, O'Malley, Wu, and Zakim.

On October 24, Mayor Walsh vetoed the passed ordinance and declared that he would appoint a board to assess what an appropriate amount would be for a councilor pay increase. In July 2015, the Compensation Advisory Board released a report that suggested a $9,500 increase to $97,000. The following month, Linehan and other councilors lambasted the advisory board's methodology and conclusion, with Linehan and several other councilors finding the proposed salary increase insultingly insufficient. On August 21, Linehan proposed a $17,500 increase to $105,000. Ten days later, Mayor Walsh countered by proposing a $99,500 increase, which Linehan commented was lower than he had hoped for Walsh to agree to. Ultimately, the council passed an increase of $99,500 on October 28, 2015 in a 9–4 vote. The only votes against the increase were Councilors Pressley, Wu, Zakim, and Yancey. The support of Councilor O'Malley, an opponent of the earlier ordinance, who hoped that he could win support for a proposal to tie future increases to council wages to the median salary for all city employees. Yancey, who had supported Linehan's efforts previously, voted against the increase in light of the October coming weeks before the 2015 Boston City Council election in which he was facing a strong (ultimately successful) challenge by Andrea Campbell and the potential for him to face voter backlash for a vote in favor of a wage increase.

==== Other matters ====
In 2014, Linehan filed an ordinance that, if passed, would have repealed the 2012 rental inspection ordinance. That same year, he championed a proposal to rename South Boston's Branch Library for former Massachusetts Senate president William M. Bulger. This generated controversy due to Bulger's having had unrepentantly exercised personal loyalty towards his criminal boss brother Whitey Bulger. Linehan also advocated for increased scrutiny and regulation of ridesharing companies such as Uber and Lyft.

In 2015, Linehan co-sponsored an ordinance introduced by Councilor LaMattina that would require individuals and groups to obtain a permit from the Boston Public Works Department in order to work as street performers. The ordinance would have required individuals to require $40 permits. Groups of under two or three would be required to pay $40 per each performer, while groups of four or more would be required to pay $160. The ordinance would also have permitted the public works and police departments to decide which public areas prohibit performances, and would further allow the public works department to determine permissible times for performances in spaces. Linehan and LaMattina justified the ordinance citing an unnamed group breakdancers in the plaza outside of Faneuil Hall who they characterized as being loud and present at all-hours, and intimidating and bullying other performers out of using the same space.

=== Sixth term (2016–17) ===
Connolly was re-elected in November 2015 for a sixth term beginning in January 2016.

After the 2015 council elections, Linehan backed Michelle Wu's successful bid to be elected council president for the 2016–17 council term. His backing helped boost Wu's bid for the position. Council rules prohibit members from serving multiple terms as president consecutively. In January 2017, David S. Bernstein of Boston magazine described Linehan, State Senator Nick Collins, and at-large city councilor Michael F. Flaherty as being the three most important "southie" (South Boston) politicians.

In May 2016, Linehan was the sole councilor to vote against placing the Community Preservation Act before Boston voters as a ballot question. The council voted 12–1 in favor of presenting voters with a ballot question on the passage of the act, which would add a 1% surcharge on residential and business properties (exempting the first $100,000 in assessed value; and exempting properties of low-income home owners and low-income and moderate-income senior citizens) in order to generate funding earmarked for affordable housing, parks and open space, as well as historic preservation efforts. That same month, he and Councilor Wu sent a letter on behalf of the council to Boston Redevelopment Authority Director Brian P. Golden outlining the council's expectations for oversight meetings the council would hold into the authority twice per year.

In late-2016, Linehan and Councilor Baker introduced a proposed resolution that would impose a 2% tax on the sale of alcoholic beverages in order to raise an estimated $20 million annually that would be allocated to services and initiatives to treat and prevent substance abuse. The ordinance was defeated in a council vote of 10–3, with only Council President Wu joining Linehan and Baker in voting in support of the ordinance.

More than a year before the 2017 Boston mayoral election, Linehan joined several other councilors in giving Mayor Walsh an early endorsement for reelection. On October 18, 2017, Linehan made the surprise move of immediately retiring from the council two months before his term had been set to expire. He endorsed Ed Flynn's campaign to be elected his successor.

== Post-council politics ==
Ahead of the general election of the 2021 Boston mayoral election, Linehan endorsed the candidacy of Annissa Essaibi George.

== Political ideology ==
Linehan was considered at times to be the council's most conservative member. He was also considered to embody "old Boston" politics. He, however, disagreed with notions that the council was divided between a conservative and a liberal bloc. In 2015, he commented, "By anybody's standards, we're all quite a liberal bunch. This is Boston, Massachusetts, after all."

== Personal life ==
Linehan and his wife, Judy, have four children and six grandchildren.

== Electoral history ==
1985 Boston City Council 2nd district election
Candidates	Preliminary election		General election	
Candidates	Votes	%	Votes	%
James M. Kelly (incumbent)	4,836	62.2	7,028	62.4
Bill Linehan	2,701	34.7	4,242	37.6
Ali J. Fiumedoro	244	3.1		

2007 Boston City Council 2nd district special election
Candidates	Primary		General election	
Candidates	Votes	%	Votes	%
Bill Linehan	1,834	23.68	4,771	52.58
Susan M. Passoni	1,870	24.14	4,217	46.48
Edward M. Flynn	1,741	22.48	52†	0.57
Robert O'Shea	831	10.73		
Brian R. Mahoney	549	7.09		
Mary Cooney	529	6.83		
Bob Ferrara	384	4.96		
all others (write-in)	7	0.09	33	0.36
Total	7,745	100	9,073	100

† write-in votes

2007 Boston City Council 2nd district election
Candidates	General election	
Candidates	Votes	%
Bill Linehan (incumbent)	3,916	95.68
all others (write-in)	177	4.32
Total	4,093	100

2009 Boston City Council 2nd district election
Candidates	General election	
Candidates	Votes	%
Bill Linehan	9278	95.68
all others (write-in)	252	4.32
Total	9,530	100

2011 Boston City Council 2nd district election
Candidates	Primary		General election	
Candidates	Votes	%	Votes	%
Bill Linehan	2,334	35.02	5,078	50.28
Suzanne Lee	2,608	39.14	4,981	49.32
Bob Ferrara	1,689	25.35		
all others (write-in)	33	0.50	41	0.41
Total	6,631	100	10,100	100

2013 Boston City Council 2nd district election
Candidates	General election	
Candidates	Votes	%
Bill Linehan	9322	52.88
Suzanne Lee	8250	46.80
all others (write-in)	58	0.33
Total	17,630	100

2015 Boston City Council 2nd district election
Candidates	General Election	
Candidates	Votes	%
Bill Linehan	3594	89.25
Suzanne Lee (write-in)	26†	0.65
all others (write-in)	407	10.11
Total	4,027	100

Preceded by Stephen J. Murphy	President of the Boston City Council; 2014–2015	Succeeded by Michelle Wu
Preceded by James M. Kelly	Member of the Boston City Council from the 2nd district 2007–2017	Succeeded by Ed Flynn
