= David Scondras =

American politician (1946–2020)

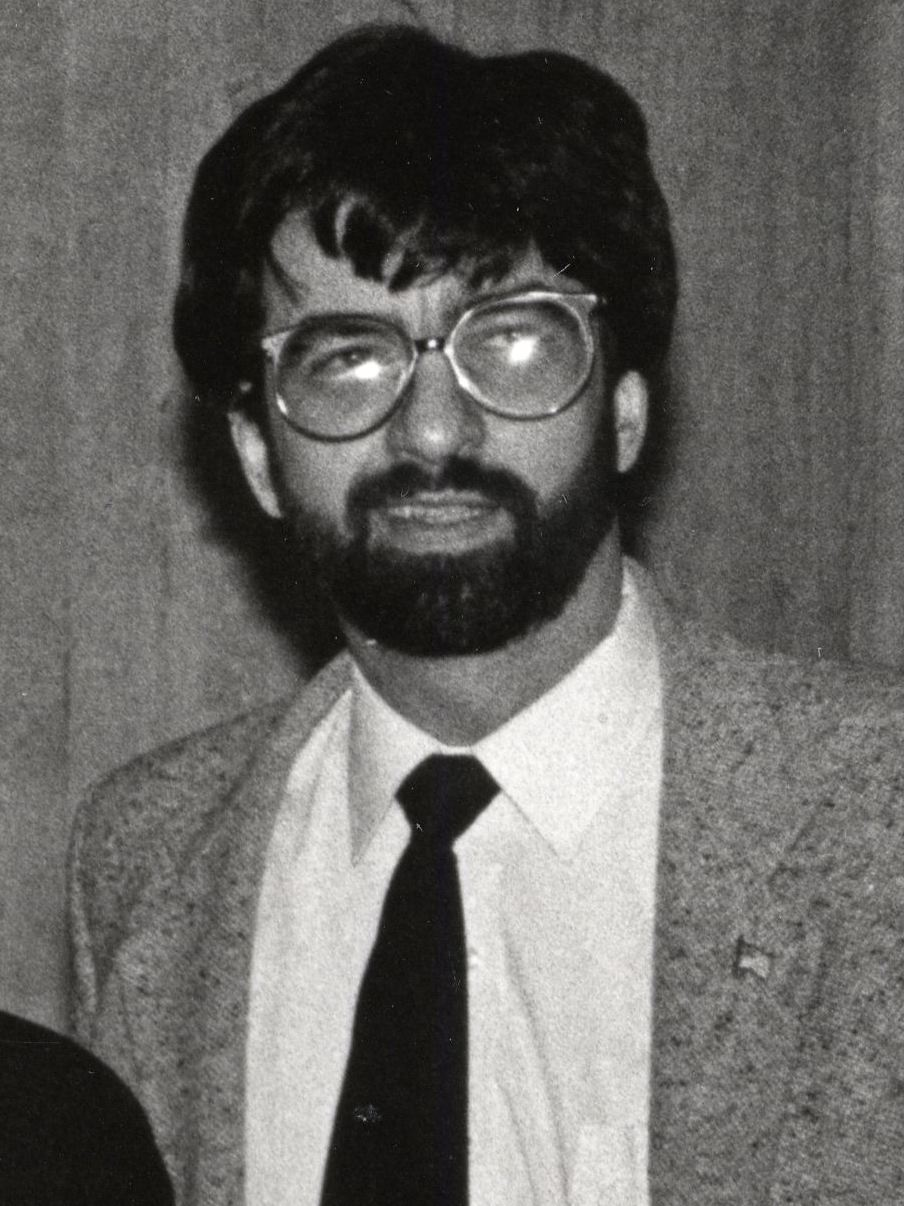
- Scondras (ca.1984–1987)

Member of the Boston City Council for District 8
- In office 1984–1993
- Preceded by: district created
- Succeeded by: Thomas M. Keane Jr.

Personal details
- Born: January 5, 1946 Lowell, Massachusetts, U.S.
- Died: October 21, 2020 (aged 74)
- Party: Democratic
- Other political affiliations: Democratic Socialists of America
- Spouse: Robert Krebs
- Education: B.A. Harvard University; M.A. Northeastern University

David Scondras (January 5, 1946 – October 21, 2020) was a member of the Boston City Council, having held the District 8 seat from 1984 through 1993. He was the city's first openly gay city council member.

== Early life ==
Scondras was born in 1946 in Lowell, Massachusetts, and graduated from Lowell High School. He received a bachelor's degree in mathematics from Harvard College in 1968 and later earned and a master's degree in economics from Northeastern University, where he taught mathematics and economics.

== Community activism ==
In 1968, Scondras moved to Fenway–Kenmore, where he worked at a neighborhood service center for the elderly. In 1971 he and Northeastern University graduate nursing student Linda Beane co-founded the Fenway Community Health Center. Scondras also co-founded the Symphony Tenants Organizing Project, a neighborhood advocacy group. After a deadly fire in 1976, the group began an investigation into arsons in the Symphony Road area that led to the conviction of 33 persons as part of an arson-for-profit ring. He later organized the Committee to Save Boston following the 1982 Boston arson spree. In 1972, he was part of a lawsuit that blocked urban redevelopment in the Fenway and created a precedent requiring environmental impact statements for large urban renewal projects. He also lobbied for the creation of the Boston Housing Court and in 1974 chaired a citizen's advisory committee to screen candidates for a judgeship on the court.

== Political career ==
Scondras ran unsuccessfully for City Council in 1981, the last election when all seats were at-large. He ran successfully in 1983, winning the seat for District 8 (Back Bay, Beacon Hill, Mission Hill, and Fenway–Kenmore) and becoming the first openly gay Boston City Council member. He was one of a few members of the Democratic Socialists of America to be elected to public office. He was considered to be left-wing and liberal.

In 1984, Scondras was the chief sponsor of the ordinance that created Boston's human rights commission. In 1985, he spoke out in support of David Jean and Donald Babets, whose foster children were taken from them because they were gay. In 1993 he sponsored the Family Protection Act, which allowed same-sex couples that shared basic living expenses to register as domestic partners and receive health insurance benefits and hospital visitation and bereavement rights given to heterosexual spouses.

He was re-elected to four two-year terms, before being defeated in the November 1993 election by Thomas M. Keane Jr. by just 27 votes (3,649–3,622). Leading up to that election, a tape of rambling, slurred calls Scondras made to 9-1-1 was leaked to WHDH radio host Howie Carr. Scondras stated he had been taking codeine for a broken leg when he made the calls. He failed to receive the endorsement of Boston's LGBT-oriented newspaper, Bay Windows, who wrote that he was "out of step with the changing gay community."

== Legal issues ==
In 1988, Scondras, Chicago alderman Helen Shiller, and three others were arrested in Chicago during a protest against the city's policies on the homeless.

In 1996, Scondras was charged with indecent sexual assault after he allegedly groped a 16-year-old boy in a Back Bay movie theater. Scondras was beaten by the youth and suffered a broken nose, jaw, and lost three teeth. The charges were dropped later that year because the alleged victim refused to testify.

In 2007, Scondras pleaded guilty to child enticement, stemming from a 2006 event in Lawrence, Massachusetts. He was sentenced to 18 months’ probation, ordered to surrender his computer and register as a sex offender, and stay off the Internet and away from children younger than 16. Scondras later sued the city of Lawrence, charging them with cruel and unusual punishment and assault and battery. In his autobiography, Scondras characterized the event as "being beaten and arrested for not having sex with a boy who did not exist." His lawsuit was dismissed in 2011 because it lacked sufficient evidence.

== Later life ==
After leaving the city council, Scondras moved to Cambridge, Massachusetts, where he ran an HIV/AIDS nonprofit and was active with a neighborhood advocacy group. He was the author of a four-book autobiography titled Angels, Liars, and Thieves, released from 2015 through 2017. Scondras died in October 2020.

== Works ==
- Scondras, David (2015). The Beginning: Angels, Liars, and Thieves, Book 1. CreateSpace Independent Publishing Platform. ISBN 978-1522927327.
- Scondras, David (2016). The Kiss: Angels, Liars, and Thieves, Book 2. CreateSpace Independent Publishing Platform. ISBN 978-1543089905.
- Scondras, David (2016). The Coup: Angels, Liars, and Thieves, Book 3. CreateSpace Independent Publishing Platform. ISBN 978-1543092721.
- Scondras, David (2017). The Long Way Home: Angels, Liars, and Thieves, Book 4. CreateSpace Independent Publishing Platform. ISBN 978-1544927657.

== See also ==
- Boston City Council election, 1983
- Boston City Council election, 1985
- Boston City Council election, 1987
- Boston City Council election, 1989
- Boston City Council election, 1991
- List of Democratic Socialists of America who have held office in the United States
