= Babets vs. Johnston =

1988 Massachusetts Supreme Judicial court case

Donald L. Babets & others vs. Secretary Of Human Services & another, 403 Mass. 230 (1988), known informally as Babets vs. Johnston, was a Massachusetts Supreme Judicial court case relating to Don Babets and David Jean’s struggle to become foster parents as a gay couple. The case resulted in Massachusetts settling the lawsuit by returning to the “best interests of the child policy”, eliminating policies that considered the sexual orientation of potential foster parents when looking at foster placement.

== Background of the case ==
In 1984 Babets and Jean applied with the Massachusetts Department of Social Services to become foster parents. In April 1985, the pair were approved and began fostering two brothers from the Massachusetts foster care system, becoming the first openly gay foster parents. The placement was approved by both the state and the children's biological mother. On May 8, 1985, journalist Ken Cooper from the Boston Globe published an article titled 'Some Oppose Foster Placement with Gay Couple', despite Babets' objections to the article being published. The day that the article was published, the children were taken away from Babets and Jean by social workers. Then, the Massachusetts Department of Social Services announced an all but ban on gay couples becoming foster parents; foster placement would look first for families, then for straight couples, then for single people, and sexual orientation would be asked about.

In response to these policy changes, Babets and Jean decided to sue. Along with two other foster parents, the Massachusetts Chapter of the National Association of Social Workers, GLAD, and ACLU, Babets and Jean filed a lawsuit against the state that challenged the new policies as violating state and federal constitutional rights to equal protection and due process of law.

Joan A. Lukey (Special Assistant Attorney General) and Patrick M. Reagan represented the defendants, and Anthony M. Doniger, Susan A. Hartnett, and Marjorie Heins represented the plaintiffs.

During the case, the plaintiffs requested documents from the defendants that detailed the internal processes by which the policies in question were developed. The defendants argued that they were not required to produce these documents.

== The court's decision and case outcome ==
The lawsuit was filed on the basis that the new regulations "irrationally and arbitrarily categorize foster parent applicants by marital status and sexual preference in such a way as to exclude single persons, unmarried couples and gay [i.e., homosexual] men and lesbians from equal consideration as foster parents." The plaintiffs argued that the new regulations violated their State and Federal constitutional rights to equal protection, due process, freedom of association, and privacy, as well as the State and Federal laws requiring that foster care placement benefit the best interest of the child.

Following the lawsuit, civil action began in the Massachusetts Superior Court on January 30, 1986. During the case, the plaintiffs requested from the defendants documents detailing the internal processes in which the new regulations in question were developed (such as drafts of proposed regulations). The State denied the request for certain documents, citing governmental privilege. However, in 1988 the judge found that no such privilege existed, and therefore that the State would need to release the requested documents.

At this point, the Supreme Judicial Court granted a request for direct review of the case. After hearing arguments for both sides, the Court upheld the original ruling, and declined to implement an Executive privilege law that would exempt the State from producing internal documents requested in action against the State.

== Aftermath ==
The state settled the case and the new regulations were dropped, with a return to the “best interests of the child” standard. Despite the state eventually settling, the children were never returned to Babets and Jean. In 1995, the couple adopted four children and received a note of congratulations from the Massachusetts General Court, which had voted to ban gay foster parents in 1985.

Michael Dukakis' role in the lawsuit attracted criticism from both the Democratic Party and LGBTQ organizations. During the 1988 Democratic Party presidential primaries, protestors were a regular sight at Dukakis' campaign rallies. The case also helped cement GLAD's role as an important advocate for equality.
