= Richard P. Iannella =

Former Boston Council member

Richard P. Iannella, son of Christopher A. Iannella, was an at-large Boston City Council member from 1994 through 1996 and Suffolk County Register of Probate from 1997 to 2011.

== Register of Probate ==
Iannella resigned four years before the end of his six-year term. In 2008, "a state auditor's report (raised) questions of malfeasance in Register of Probate's Office. According to the report, US$12,885 in 'voided' transactions disappeared from cash registers in (his) office ... between July 2000 and June 2002. In addition to not complying with regulations that secure cash flow, (he) is said to have failed to fill out a form explaining the shortfall, the report states."

== Personal life ==
Iannella lives in the Jamaica Plain section of Boston.
