= Christopher A. Iannella =

American politician

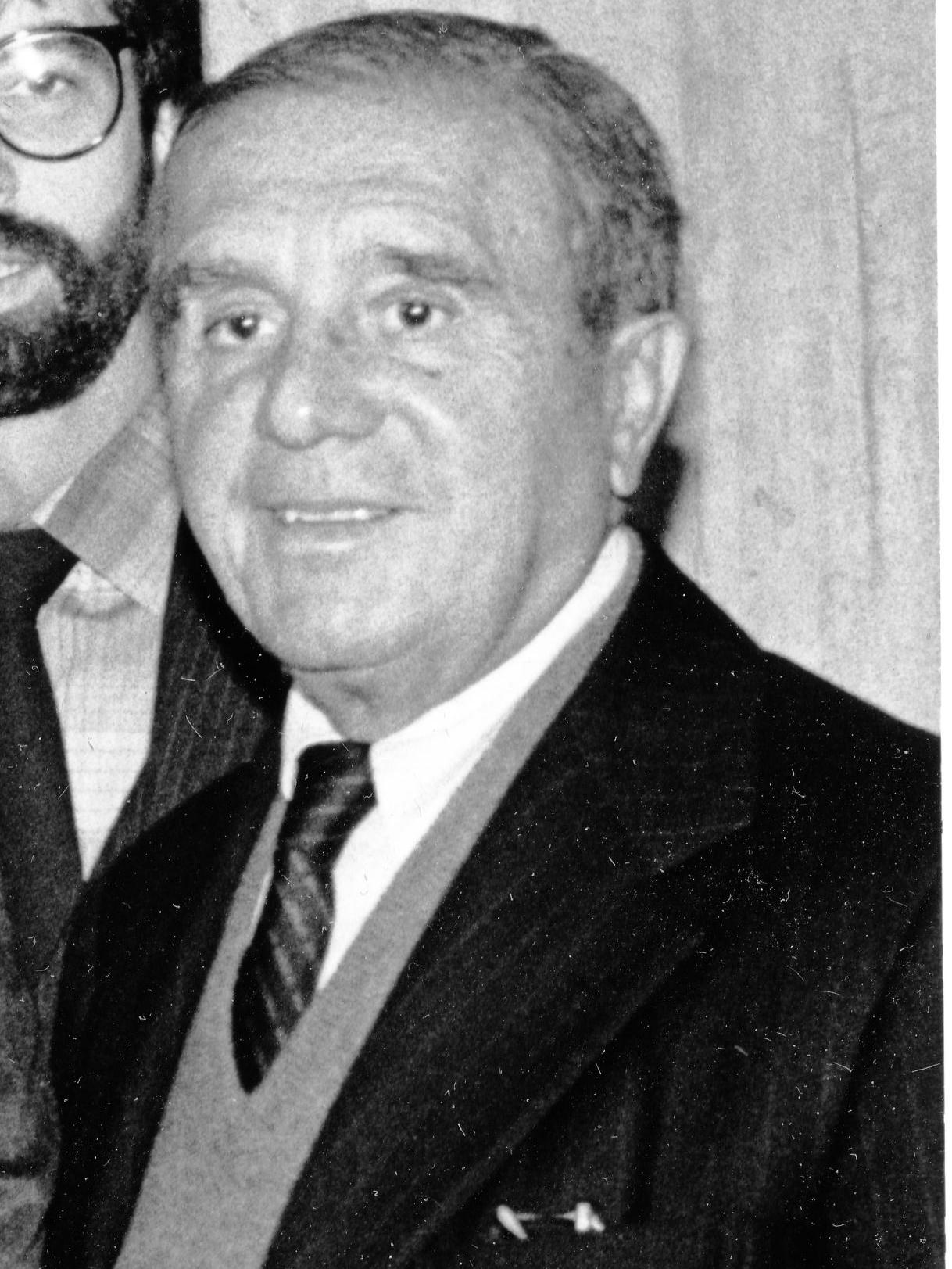
- Ianella, circa 1984-1987

President of the Boston City Council
- In office 1988–1992
- Preceded by: Bruce Bolling
- Succeeded by: Dapper O'Neil
- In office 1982
- Preceded by: Patrick F. McDonough
- Succeeded by: Joseph M. Tierney
- In office 1980
- Preceded by: Joseph M. Tierney
- Succeeded by: Patrick F. McDonough
- In office 1962
- Preceded by: Patrick F. McDonough
- Succeeded by: Peter F. Hines

Member of the Boston City Council
- In office 1970–1992
- Succeeded by: Bruce Bolling
- In office 1958–1967

Member of the Massachusetts House of Representatives
- In office 1950–1957

Personal details
- Born: May 29, 1913 San Sossio Baronia, Italy
- Died: September 12, 1992 (aged 79) Boston, Massachusetts, U.S.
- Resting place: Walnut Hill Cemetery
- Party: Democratic
- Spouse: Virginia Nelson
- Children: 4, including Christopher Jr. and Richard
- Education: Boston College (BA); Harvard University (JD)
- Occupation: Attorney

Christopher A. Iannella (May 29, 1913 – September 12, 1992) was a member of the Boston City Council in Boston, Massachusetts, for 33 years, spanning the late 1950s until his death. He also served eight one-year terms as City Council president.

== Early years ==
Iannella was born in the small village of San Sossio Baronia in Avellino, Italy, and arrived in the U.S. with his mother and sister at the age of eight, unable to speak English. He went on to graduate from The English High School, Boston College, and Harvard Law School. He was one of the "college boys" featured in William Foote Whyte's classic text, Street Corner Society.

== Career ==
A Democrat, Iannella was elected to the Massachusetts House of Representatives in 1950, and to the Boston City Council in November 1957. He served on the council from 1958 through 1967, when he ran unsuccessfully for mayor of Boston in that year's election. He was again elected to the City Council in November 1969, and served from 1970 through his death in 1992. He was the council president in 1962, 1980, 1982, and from 1988 to 1992.

Iannella helped lead an unsuccessful effort to save Boston's West End before it was demolished in the 1950s. He was known for authoring a law that encouraged the city to hire Boston residents for government jobs, and more generally as an effective intermediary in the often contentious atmosphere of Boston politics.

In 1990, a plaque honoring Iannella was added to Paul Revere Mall. As a child, Iannella lived with his parents in one of the apartment buildings that was razed in order to make room for the mall.

== Personal life ==
He was survived by four children, three of whom worked in politics. Christopher Iannella Jr. has been a member of the Massachusetts Governor's Council since 1993. Richard P. Iannella was an at-large City Council member from 1994 through 1996 and Suffolk County Register of Probate from 1997 to 2011. Suzanne Iannella was a member of the Boston Licensing Board and the state Alcoholic Beverages Control Commission as well as an unsuccessful candidate for city council in November 1997 and November 1999. The room in Boston City Hall where the City Council meets is named the Christopher A. Iannella Chamber in his honor.

=== Death ===
Iannella died in September 1992, of complications from cancer. He was buried in Walnut Hill Cemetery in Brookline, Massachusetts.

== See also ==
- 1951–1952 Massachusetts legislature
- 1953–1954 Massachusetts legislature
- 1955–1956 Massachusetts legislature
- 1975 Boston City Council election
- 1977 Boston City Council election
- 1979 Boston City Council election
- 1981 Boston City Council election
- 1983 Boston City Council election
- 1985 Boston City Council election
- 1987 Boston City Council election
- 1989 Boston City Council election
- 1991 Boston City Council election

Preceded by Patrick F. McDonough; Joseph M. Tierney; Patrick F. McDonough; Bruce Bolling	President of the Boston City Council; 1962; 1980; 1982; 1988–1992	Succeeded by Peter F. Hines; Patrick F. McDonough; Joseph M. Tierney; Dapper O'Neil
