= Frederick C. Langone =

American politician

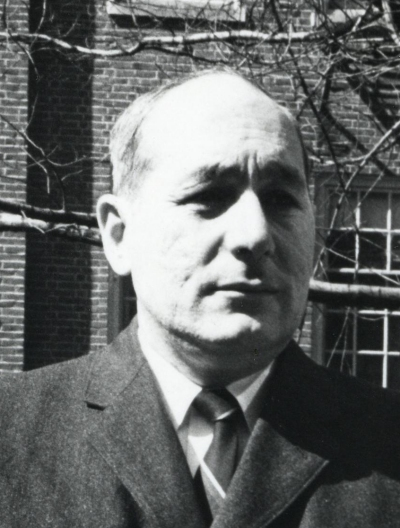
- Langone in the 1960s

President of the Boston City Council
- In office 1966–1966
- Preceded by: John J. Tierney
- Succeeded by: Barry T. Hynes

Member of the Boston City Council
- In office 1973–1983
- Preceded by: Joe Moakley
- In office 1964–1971
- In office 1961–1961
- Preceded by: Joseph C. White

Personal details
- Born: October 31, 1921 North End, Boston, Massachusetts, U.S.
- Died: June 25, 2001 (aged 79) North End, Boston, Massachusetts, U.S.
- Resting place: Holy Cross Cemetery; Malden, Massachusetts
- Party: Democratic
- Spouse: Aurora (Gatto) Langone
- Children: Barbara, Lorraine
- Education: Boston University; Boston University School of Law
- Occupation: Lawyer; Politician

Frederick Charles Langone (October 31, 1921 – June 25, 2001) was an American politician who served as a member of the Boston City Council from 1961 to 1971 and from 1973 to 1983. He was Council President in 1966. Langone, unofficially dubbed the mayor of the North End, was known as a defender of the "common guy" and an opponent of gentrification, as well as a budget expert who was extremely knowledgeable about the workings of city government. He was also known for his colorful personality.

== Early life ==
Langone was born in the North End of Boston to a prominent Massachusetts political family. His grandfather, Joseph A. Langone, was a state legislator; his father, Joseph A. Langone Jr., was a state senator; his brother, Joseph A. Langone III, was a state representative; and his mother, Clementina Langone (née Poto), was a civic leader who served as vice chairman of the Democratic State Committee. The Langone family operated the funeral home that buried Sacco and Vanzetti in 1927.

Frederick Langone attended Boston College High School, Boston University, and the Boston University School of Law. After World War II, he served in United States Army Counterintelligence as an officer and was stationed in Japan. In 1944, he was stationed at Fort Bragg, North Carolina in Anti-Aircraft Coast Artillery as a lieutenant.

== Boston city council ==
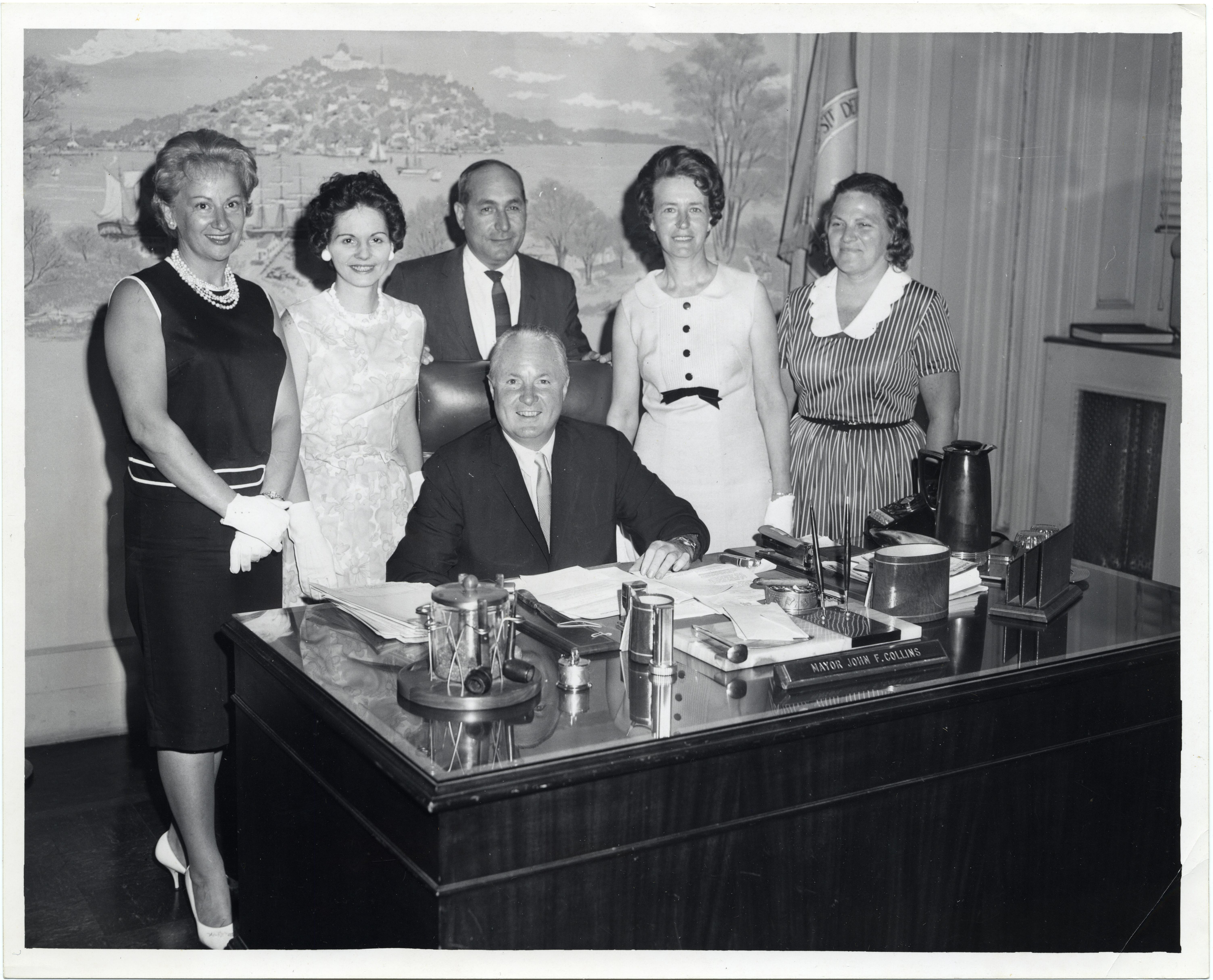
Langone stands behind mayor John F. Collins while he signs an ordinance in June 1965

Langone ran unsuccessfully for the Boston City Council four times before he joined the council in 1961 to complete the term of the ailing Joseph White. He was elected in his own right in 1963 and remained in office until he was defeated for reelection in 1971. He returned to the council in 1973 after he replaced Joe Moakley, who was elected to the United States House of Representatives.

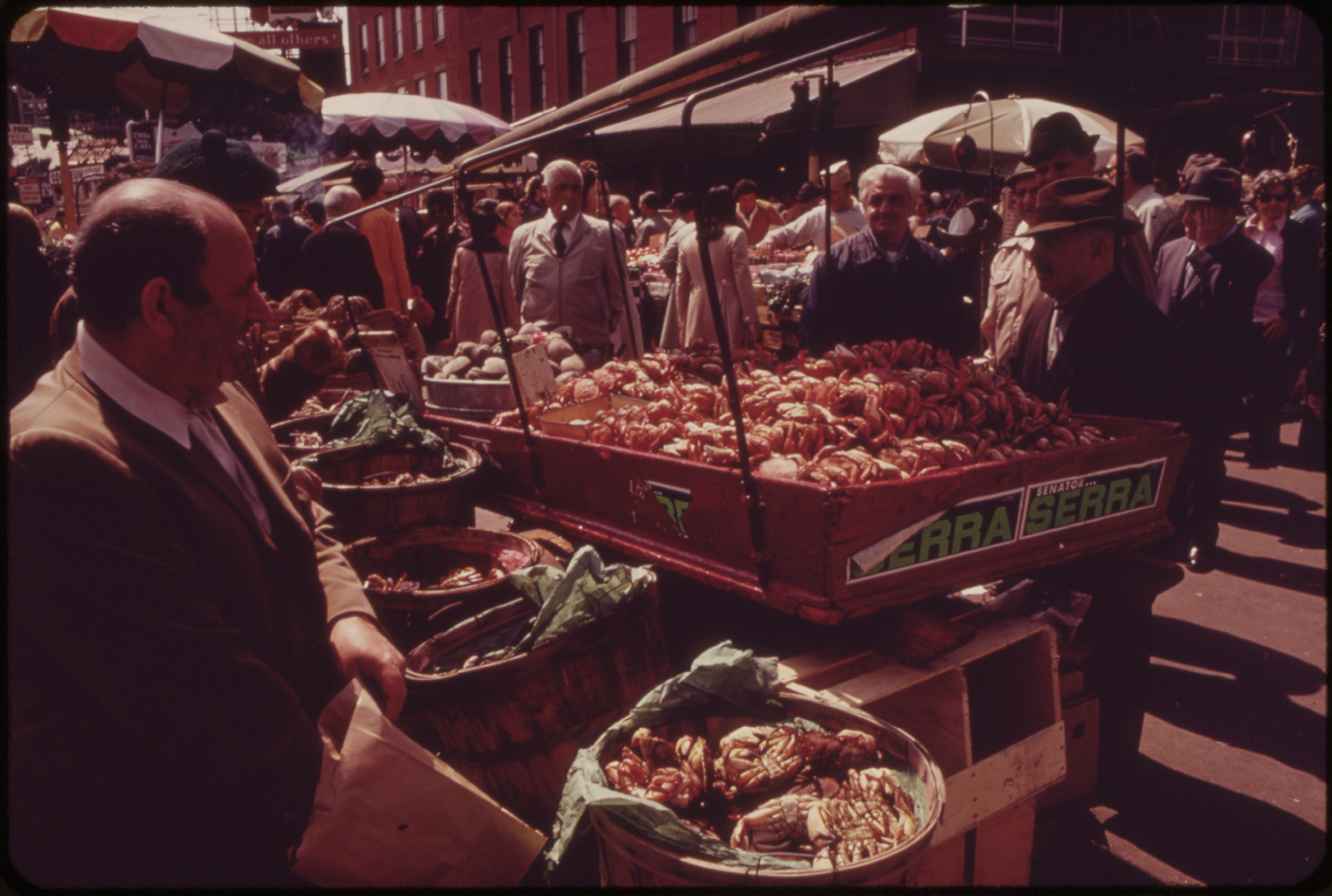
Haymarket vendors in 1973.

During his tenure on the council, he supported the Haymarket Pushcart Association, and helped save the open-air market in Haymarket Square when politicians wanted to shut it down. Early in his career, he had been a member of the committee that had tried and failed to stop the demolition of much of the West End; this experience informed his views a decade later, when as a city councilor he fought to preserve the North End waterfront. He succeeded in getting the city to build affordable senior citizen housing, introduced rent control, and blocked upscale development that would have displaced many longtime North End residents.

Langone initiated hearings to investigate Mayor Kevin H. White's private use of the city-owned Parkman House. He also helped write the Boston Funding Loan Act of 1982, which was created to settle property tax abatement cases that came about as a result of a Massachusetts Supreme Judicial Court finding that the city had overassessed commercial property. The city received surplus of about $3 million when the bonds were redeemed ahead of schedule.

Langone, who spent eleven years as the chairman of the Ways and Means Committee, was recognized for his knowledge of city finances. City budget director Dennis J. Morgan described Langone's fiscal prowess as, at times, putting Langone in the superior bargaining position.

At a time when racism was commonplace in Boston politics, Langone was supportive of black leadership. As fellow councilman Bruce Bolling put it, "He'll help anybody, black or white."

=== Style ===
Langone was also known for making long-winded speeches. His tirades against the Kevin White administration led to the passage of "Freddy's Rule", which limited Council speeches to 10 minutes. In addition to his speeches, Langone was also known for his malapropisms, which included demanding "I want to know who was there! W-O-H. Who?!" when asking about a party hosted by White at the Parkman House and stating, "You couldn't even get near the place when Olivia, Newton, and John were there" while arguing that the Concerts on the Common should have made more money. He was also known for smoking Garcia Y Vega cigars and for occasionally offering homemade wine and tomatoes, the latter of which he grew on the terrace near the City Council chambers, to help City Hall committee meetings run smoothly.

== Other races ==
In 1976 he was a candidate for the United States Senate, but lost the Democratic nomination to incumbent Ted Kennedy.

In 1982 he was a candidate for Lieutenant Governor of Massachusetts. At the Democratic Convention, he failed to receive the 15% of delegates necessary to make the ballot. He sued the Office of the Secretary of the Commonwealth of Massachusetts to get his name on the ballot, but the Massachusetts Supreme Judicial Court upheld the 15% rule.

In 1983, he ran for Mayor of Boston, finishing in sixth place in the preliminary election with 1.36% of the vote. In 1985, he finished in fifth place in the general election for four at-large City Council seats. He was again a candidate for mayor in 1987, but dropped out of the race to run for City Council; he finished in sixth place in the general election for four at-large seats.

== Later life and death ==
After leaving the council, Langone maintained a law practice and wrote for the North End Post-Gazette. In 1994 he published a memoir and local history titled The North End: Where It All Began. Langone died on June 25, 2001, at his home in the North End. He was 79 years old.
