= Rosaria Salerno =

American politician

Rosaria Salerno is the former City Clerk of Boston and a former member of the Boston City Council.

Salerno was first elected to the City Council in November 1987, and served as an at-large member from 1988 to 1993. She was a candidate for Mayor of Boston in 1993, finishing in fourth place with 17.54% of the vote.

Salerno was regarded to be a liberal member of the city council.

On January 26, 1995, Salerno was appointed City Clerk by the City Council, succeeding the retiring Patrick F. McDonough. She retired in 2011.

Preceded by Patrick F. McDonough	Boston City Clerk; 1995–2011	Succeeded by Maureen Feeney
