= Robert Travaglini =

American politician

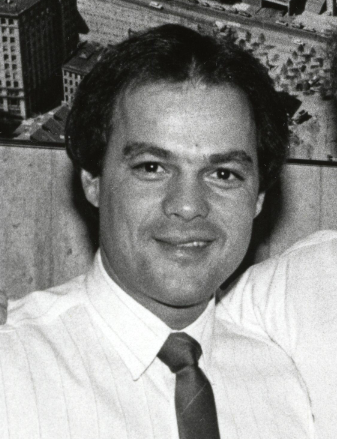
- Travaglini in the 1980s.

93rd President of the Massachusetts Senate
- In office January 1, 2003 – March 19, 2007
- Preceded by: Tom Birmingham
- Succeeded by: Therese Murray

Member of the Massachusetts Senate from 1st Suffolk and Middlesex district
- In office 1992–2007
- Preceded by: Michael LoPresti Jr.
- Succeeded by: Anthony Petruccelli

Boston City Councilor from District 1
- In office 1984–1993
- Preceded by: district created
- Succeeded by: Diane J. Modica

Personal details
- Born: Robert Edward Travaglini; July 20, 1952 (age 74) Massachusetts
- Party: Democratic
- Spouse: Kelly (née Holtz)
- Children: 3 (Taylor, Jennifer, and Andrew)
- Education: Boston State College
- Occupation: Politician; Lobbyist

Robert Edward Travaglini (born July 20, 1952 in Massachusetts) is an American politician and lobbyist. From 2003 to 2007, Travaglini served as President of the Massachusetts Senate. He represented the first Middlesex and Suffolk senate district, encompassing portions of Boston, Cambridge, Revere, and Winthrop.

== Career ==
Travaglini began his career as an executive assistant to then Massachusetts Attorney General Francis X. Bellotti from 1975 to 1981, followed by a three-year stint as administrative assistant to Boston's Mayor Kevin White.

After earning experience as an assistant, Travaglini entered the political world in the 1983 election for the Boston City Council. He was elected as the councilor for District 1, and was subsequently re-elected to four two-year terms. In November 1992, Travaglini was elected to the Massachusetts Senate, and served both as a state senator and city council member during 1993.

In 1999, Travaglini moved up in rank to Majority Whip of the Senate. He reached the pinnacle of his political career in 2003, when he was elected as President of the Massachusetts Senate. Travaglini was the first Italian-American to lead either legislative branch in Massachusetts.

Travaglini resigned from the senate position in 2007, in order to start a lobbying firm, Travaglini Eisenberg Kiley, and later one called Travaglini Scorzoni Kiley.

== Education ==
Travaglini attended Savio Preparatory High School in East Boston and then continued on to Boston State College, where he earned a Bachelor of Science in Political Science in 1974.

== Personal life ==
Travaglini, a longtime resident of East Boston, now resides in Winthrop. He is married to Kelly (née Holtz) and has three children: Taylor; Jennifer; and Andrew. His brother, Michael, was an unsuccessful candidate for an at-large City Council seat in 1993.

In 2008, Travaglini spent $30,000 on an oil-on-canvas portrait by Boston-based artist Thomas Ouellette, which now hangs in the Senate Reading Room of the Massachusetts State House, alongside former Senate Presidents such as Calvin Coolidge and Horace Mann. As of 2008, only eleven Senate Presidents have portraits in the State House.

== See also ==
- 1991–1992 Massachusetts legislature
- 1993–1994 Massachusetts legislature
- 1995–1996 Massachusetts legislature
- 1997–1998 Massachusetts legislature
- 1999–2000 Massachusetts legislature
- 2001–2002 Massachusetts legislature
- 2003–2004 Massachusetts legislature
- 2005–2006 Massachusetts legislature

Political offices
Preceded by Thomas Birmingham	President of the Massachusetts Senate; 2003–2007	Succeeded by Therese Murray
