= John A. Nucci =

American academic administrator

John A. Nucci is the retired senior vice president of External Affairs at Suffolk University and a member of the Board of Directors of Massport.

== Career ==
At Suffolk University he oversees, government relations, community relations, real estate and institutional expansion. He first started at Suffolk in 1992 as an adjunct instructor of Public Management in the Sawyer Business School and became Vice President of Government & Community Affairs in 2006, and the Senior Vice President for External Affairs in 2015.

Nucci has been generally recognized as having recreated the Suffolk University campus footprint in Downtown Boston. During his tenure the university added three residence halls, one Academic and Science Center, a TV studio, a new theater located in Boston's Theater District, home athletic fields (for the first time in university's history), one temporary residence hall in Allston, and additional office space on Beacon Street across from the Massachusetts State House.

Nucci was first elected to public office in 1983. He served six years on the Boston School Committee, including four years as School Committee president. He went on to serve two terms on the Boston City Council as a City Councilor At-Large, ran unsuccessfully for mayor of Boston in 1993, and was elected in 1994 as the clerk magistrate of the Suffolk County Superior Court for Criminal Business. He left the Superior Court in 2006 to focus on his work at Suffolk University.

In 2016 John Nucci was named to MASSPORT Community Advisory Committee (MCAC), a group of representatives of 41 cities and towns across the state. He was then selected by the MCAC in 2016 to be a member of the MASSPORT Board of Directors. In 2022 Nucci was reappointed to a second 7-year term on the MASSPORT Board.

== Education ==
A lifelong resident of East Boston, Nucci graduated from the Boston Latin School in 1970. He continued his education receiving a BAS in 1974 from Boston College and an MPA in 1979 from Suffolk University, where he was inducted into Pi Alpha Alpha, the National Honor Society for Public Administrators.

== Personal life ==
Nucci received a kidney transplant in 2018 as a result of polycystic kidney disease (PKD). He has three sons and four grandchildren.
