= James M. Kelly (Boston politician) =

American politician (1940–2007)

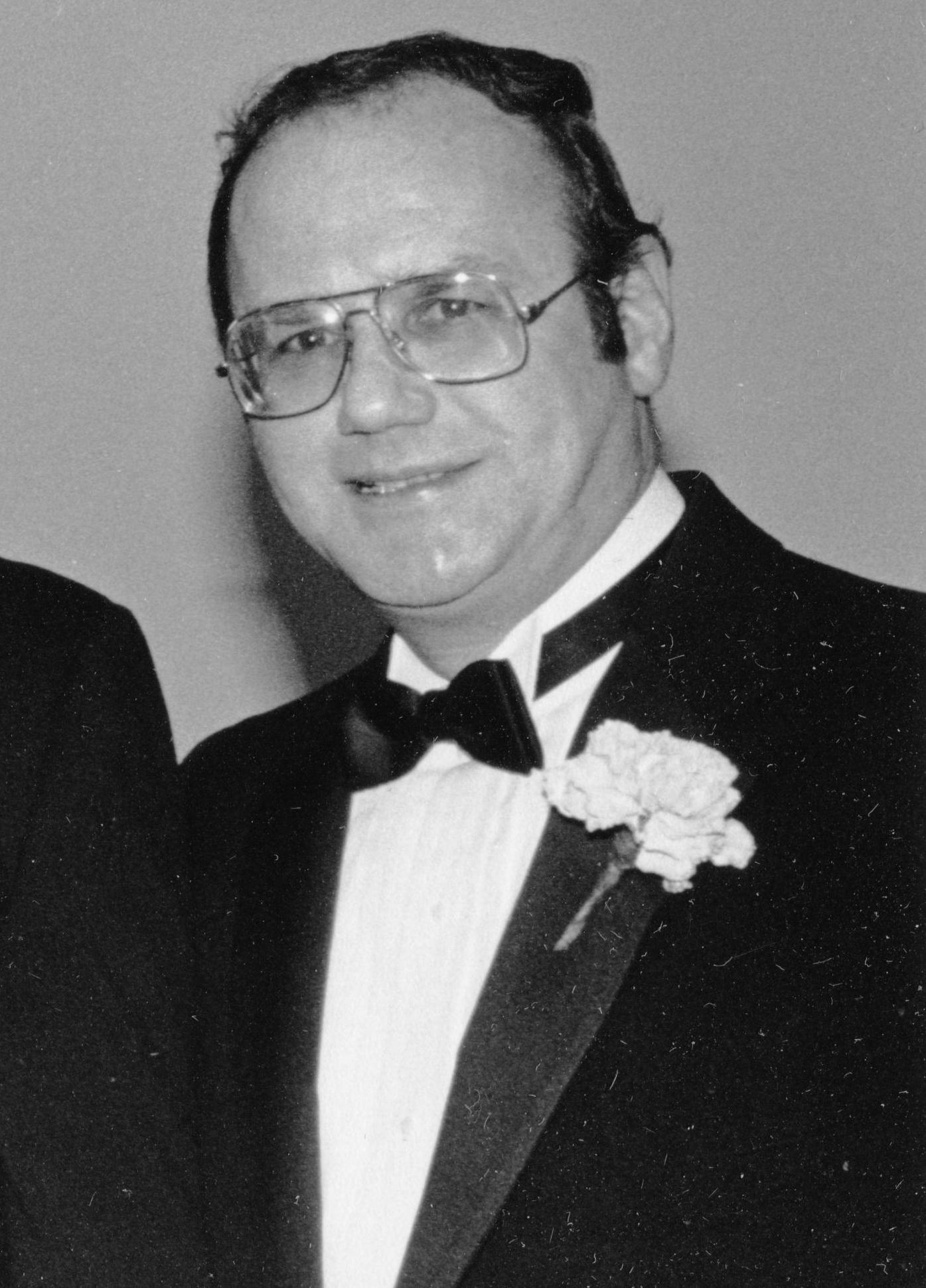
- Kelley in the 1980s

President of the Boston City Council
- In office 1994–2000
- Preceded by: Thomas Menino
- Succeeded by: Charles Yancey

Member of the Boston City Council from District 2
- In office 1984–2007
- Preceded by: District created
- Succeeded by: Bill Linehan

Personal details
- Born: 1940
- Died: January 9, 2007 (aged 66–67)
- Resting place: Cedar Grove Cemetery (Dorchester, Boston)

James M. Kelly (1940 – January 9, 2007) was an American politician who served on the Boston City Council for 23 years, representing South Boston, the South End and Chinatown.

== Biography ==
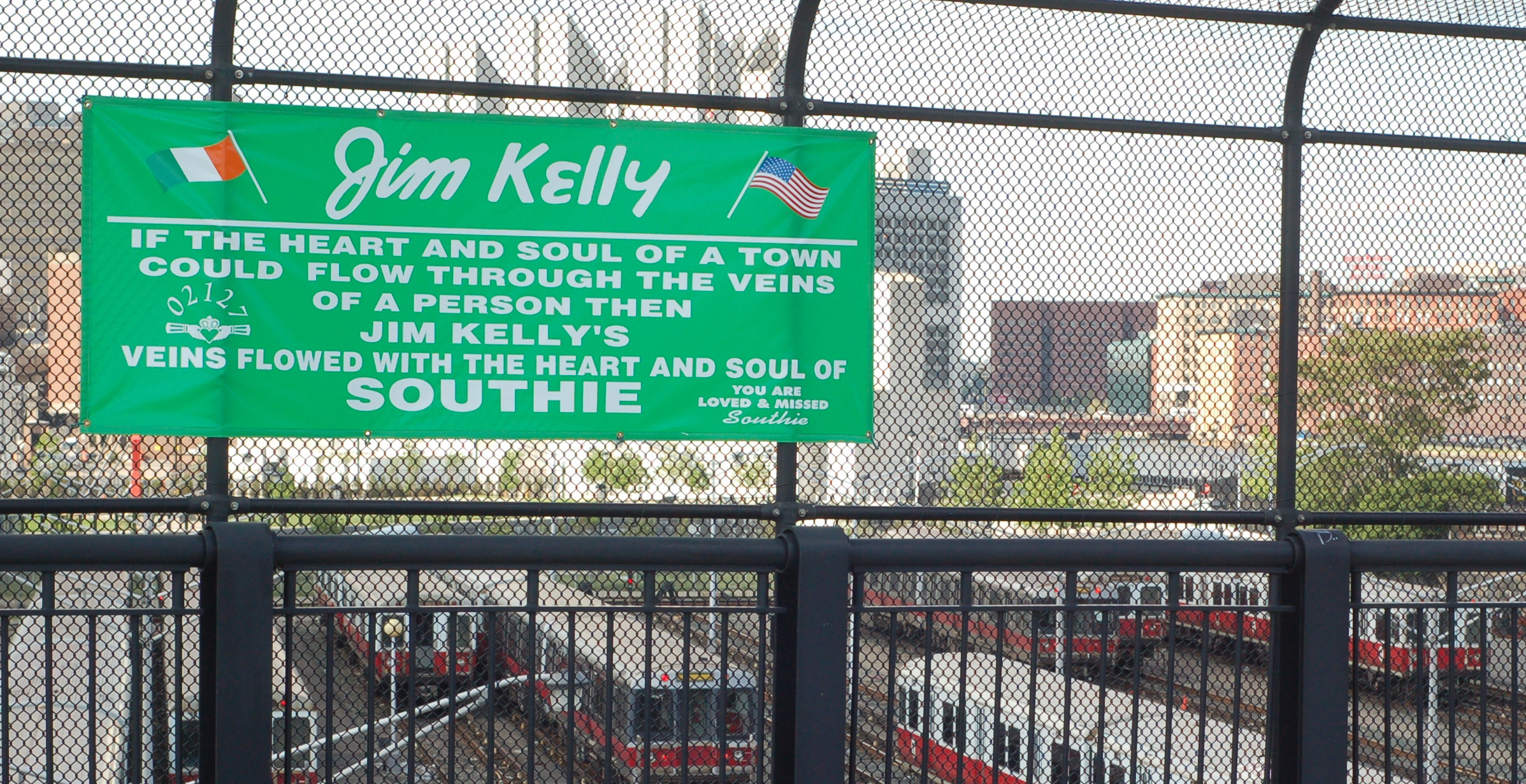
Tribute to Jim Kelly, South Boston, 2007

Kelly was a graduate of South Boston High School and was a sheet metal worker before entering politics.

Kelly was first elected to the Boston City Council in November 1983, and served from January 1984 until his death in January 2007. He was the council president from 1994 through 2000.

Kelly represented the second district, covering much of South Boston.

Kelly had, before joining the council, been one of the leading opponents of court ordered busing to achieve racial integration in public schools during the 1970s. He continued to fight such plans as a member of the city council. He also attacked mandated housing integration and affirmative action.

After serving seven consecutive single-year terms as council president beginning in 1993 (the longest tenure of any council president), it became clear that Kelly had insufficient support among fellow councilors for an eighth-consecutive term as council president. A group of councilors opposing his re-election backed Brian Honan for president, remaining steadfast in their refusal to back Kelly and producing a deadlock. In a surprise move, Kelly backed Charles Yancey to serve as the next council president. Yancey had no prior knowledge that Kelly was orchestrating to elect him council president. Yancey and Kelly had previously been at odds numerous times over the years over matters of race, sometimes exchanging expletives. Yancey had previously characterized Kelly as being a racist, something Kelly denied. Due to Kelly's maneuvering, Yancey was elected the new council president on January 1, 2001.

Previously, in 2000, Yancey had influenced the linkage fee arrangement that the city agreed to with the developers of a hotel and convention center project in South Boston. He received criticism over this deal, being accused of directing an unfair share of the linkage funds to South Boston.

== See also ==
- The Soiling of Old Glory, Pulitzer Prize-winning photograph taken in 1976 that includes Kelly

Preceded by Thomas Menino	President of the Boston City Council; 1994–2000	Succeeded by Charles Yancey
