= Dapper O'Neil =

American politician

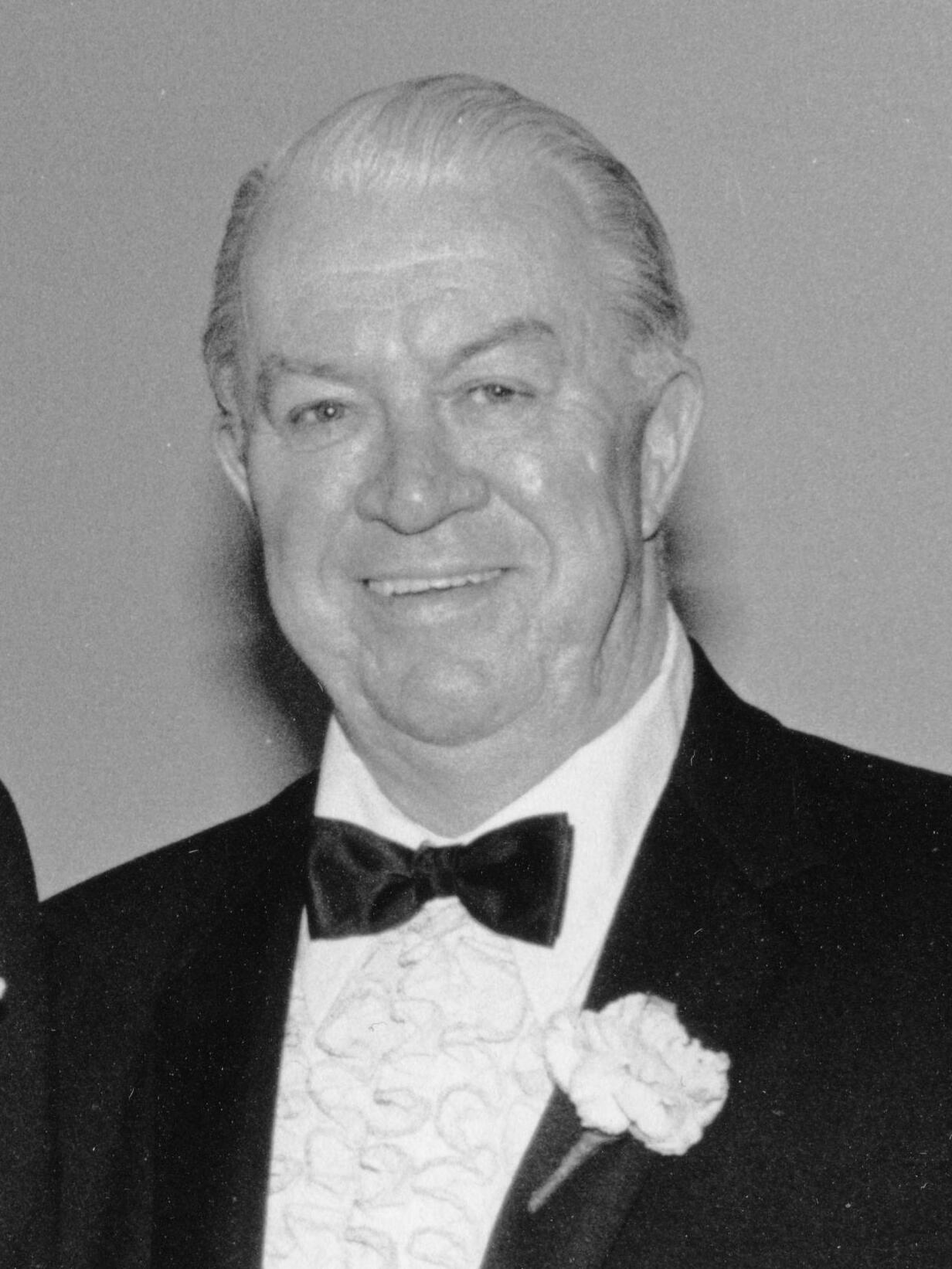
- O'Neil, circa 1984-1987

President of the Boston City Council
- In office 1992
- Preceded by: Christopher A. Iannella
- Succeeded by: Thomas Menino

Boston City Councilor At-Large
- In office 1971–1999
- Preceded by: Louise Day Hicks
- Succeeded by: Michael F. Flaherty

Personal details
- Born: April 12, 1920 Boston, Massachusetts
- Died: December 19, 2007 (aged 87) Boston, Massachusetts
- Party: Democratic
- Education: Staley School of the Spoken Word

Albert Leo "Dapper" O'Neil (April 12, 1920 – December 19, 2007) was an American politician who served as a socially conservative member of the Boston City Council for twenty-eight years. Prior to joining the council, he served on the Boston Licensing Board and was an operative for the Mayor of Boston James Michael Curley.

== Early years ==
O'Neil graduated from Roxbury Memorial High School in 1937, and attended Suffolk University Law School, but left before graduating to serve in the United States Army during World War II. After the war, he graduated from the Staley School of the Spoken Word with a degree in oratory. He worked with a railroad company and was then employed by the state housing board.

In a 1978 interview, O'Neil explained that he got his nickname because his mother was very meticulous about how her children dressed, and where he grew up (the Roxbury neighborhood of Boston) "everybody had a nickname."

== Political career ==
From 1948 to 1961, O'Neil ran for office five times, three times for state representative and once each for City Council and School Committee, losing all five races. He then chauffeured for Massachusetts gubernatorial candidate Endicott Peabody. After Peabody was elected Governor of Massachusetts in November 1962, he considered appointing O'Neil as his patronage secretary; however, O'Neil made public comments critical of the Massachusetts Democratic Party chairman, Gerard F. Doherty, and the job went to a Worcester attorney, William J. Luby. In October 1963, Peabody appointed O'Neil to the Boston Licensing Board. In 1967, O'Neil ran for Mayor of Boston, finishing eighth in the preliminary election with only 0.95% of the vote.

=== Boston City Council ===
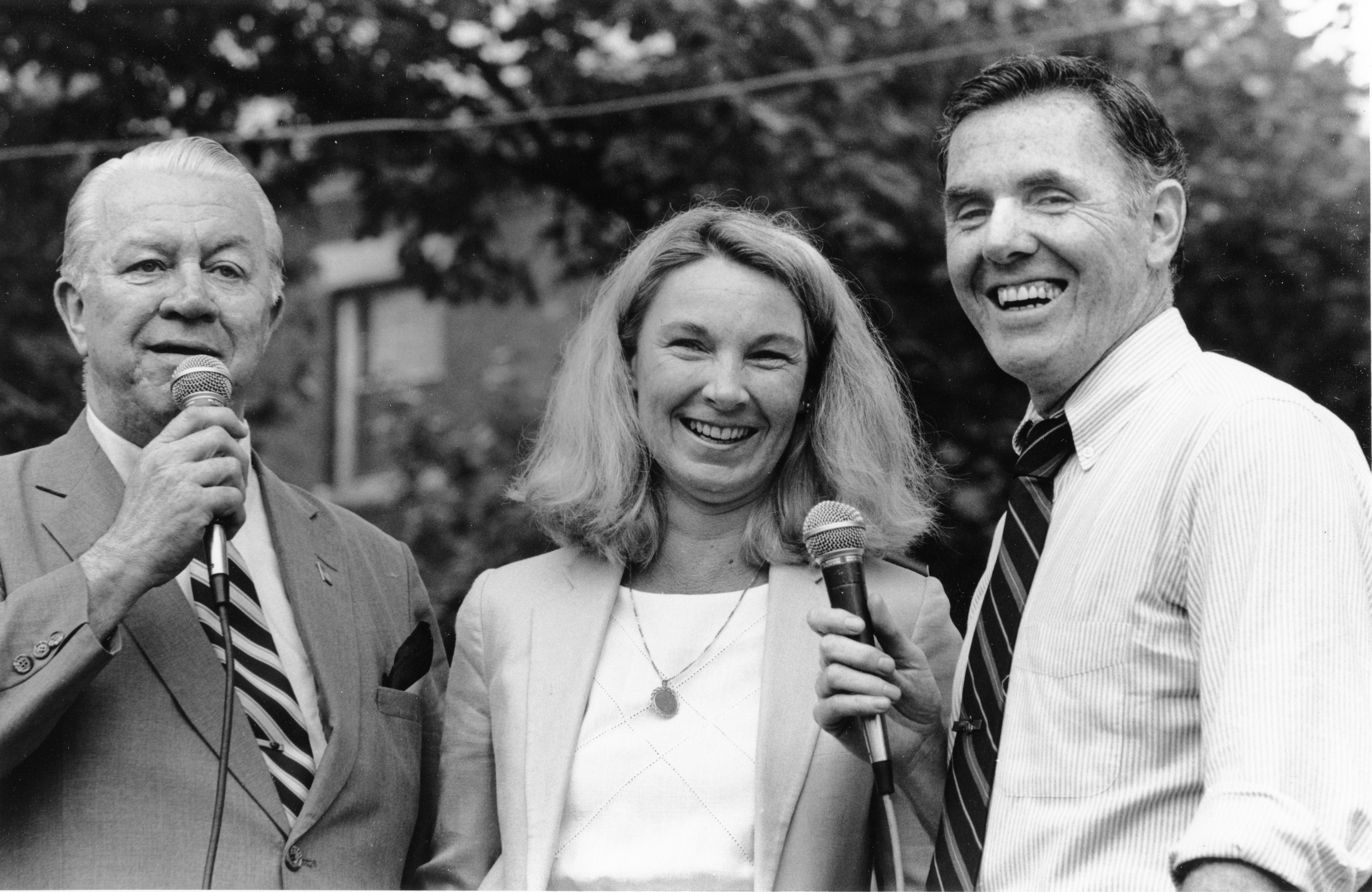
O'Neil (at left) with fellow councillor Maura Hennigan and Mayor Raymond Flynn (c. 1984–1987)

In January 1971, O'Neil was appointed to the Boston City Council after the resignation of Louise Day Hicks, who had been elected to the United States House of Representatives. He was subsequently re-elected fourteen times, each term lasting two years.

While on the council, O'Neil thrice ran for Suffolk County Sheriff. He lost the Democratic nomination to Thomas Eisenstadt in 1974, Dennis J. Kearney in 1978, and Robert Rufo in 1986.

In 1992, he was elected Council President after the death of Christopher A. Iannella.

In November 1999, O'Neil finished fifth (behind Francis Roache, Stephen J. Murphy, Peggy Davis-Mullen, Michael F. Flaherty) in an at-large race in which the top four make the council. In a story published in The Boston Globe after O'Neil's loss, Boston historian Thomas H. O'Connor wrote, "This is the last hurrah not merely for a man but for the politicking he represents." O'Connor went on to say that O'Neil's career endured "largely through the kinds of loyalties he built up over thirty years, from people for whom he'd done favors, and they'd never forget him, and they'd talk about him to their relatives. He built a political career on a system of local patronage."

=== Political views ===
O'Neil was a longtime supporter of the right to bear arms; he was known to carry a .38 handgun, which he drew at least twice to capture criminals, and he stated in a 1976 council meeting, "I'm an excellent shot. I'll protect people against anyone who comes through that door."

In January 1999, O'Neil confirmed he was a supporter of the Council of Conservative Citizens, a white supremacist group, leading to a heated exchange with fellow councillor Gareth R. Saunders.

Similar to his council predecessor, Hicks, O'Neil was a fierce opponent of court-mandated desegregation busing during the Boston desegregation busing crisis.

In 2015, journalist Michael Jonas of the Commonwealth Beacon recalled O'Neil's politics negatively, writing that O'Neil, "trafficked in the bile-based politics of racial division and resentment of "outsiders" that helped give Boston a tarnished reputation nationally that the city is still working to overcome." O'Neil's 2007 Associated Press-distributed obituary reflected of his politics, "an unabashed conservative in a liberal town. Some thought him a bigot, but his style endeared him to others."

== Personal life ==
In 1995, Boston newspapers reported that harassment complaints had been filed against O'Neil by a female city worker and a female college student; O'Neil later counter-sued the complainants, claiming that he had been slandered.

A 1984 recording by O'Neil of the song "The Irish Belly Dancer" can be found online. In 1996, he won $50,000 from a Massachusetts Lottery scratch ticket.

O'Neil never married; he had a girlfriend, Helen T. Skrzowski, for 56 years.

O'Neil was a tobacco smoker into his seventies. In his later years of life, he suffered deteriorating health. After treatment for prostate cancer in 1992 and 1993, O'Neil had cancer surgery in January 1998. By 1997, he was legally blind. In 2001, O'Neil suffered a heart attack. In his later years, he also required a knee replacement and gallbladder surgery. He suffered a rare degenerative neurological illness that led to severe loss of weight. O'Neil died in West Roxbury on December 19, 2007—his funeral was held at St. Theresa of Avila Church in West Roxbury. He is buried in the Massachusetts National Cemetery in Bourne.

Preceded by Christopher A. Iannella	President of the Boston City Council; 1992	Succeeded by Thomas Menino
