= Raymond Flynn =

American politician (born 1939)

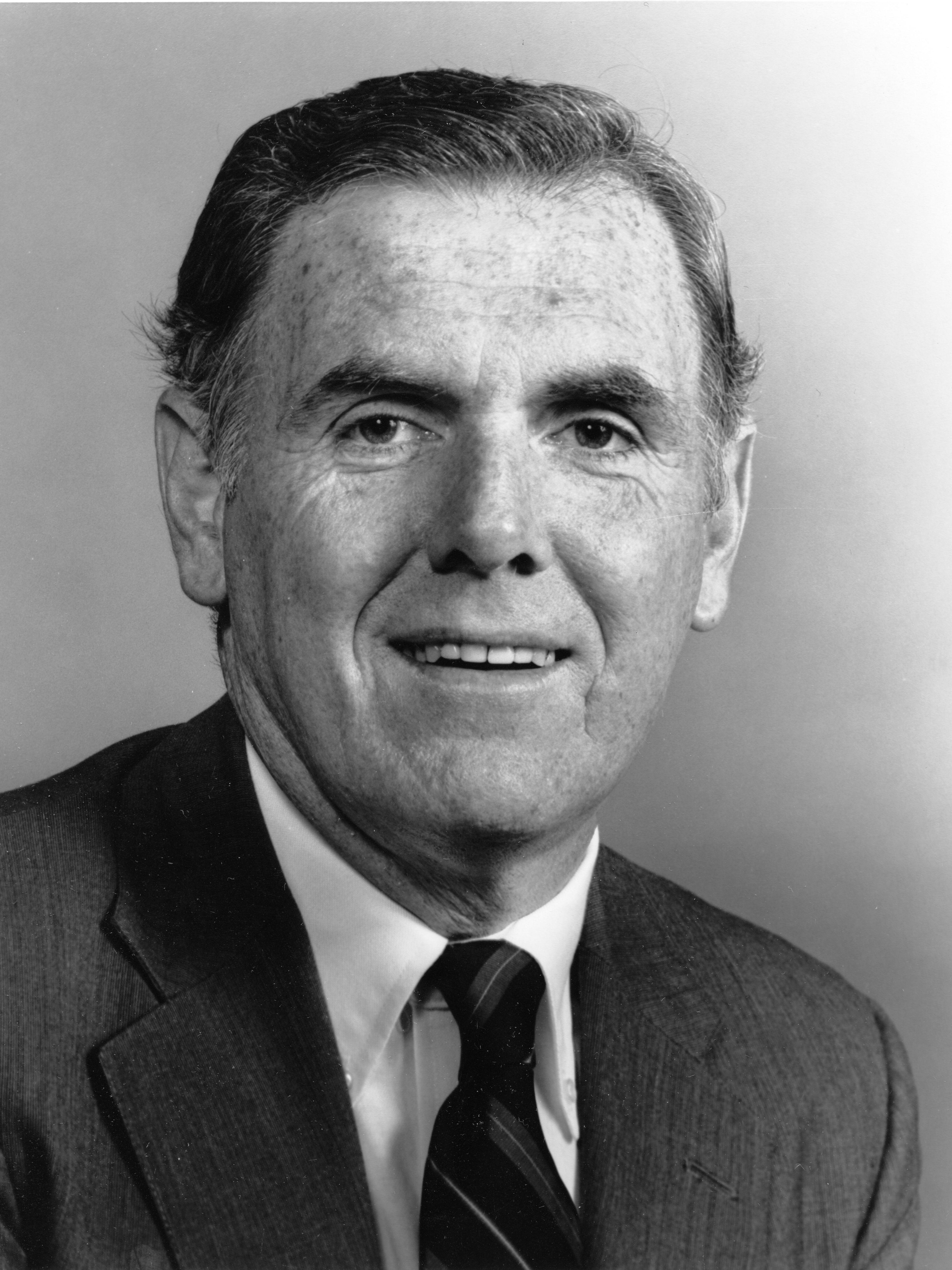
- Flynn (circa 1984–1987)

4th United States Ambassador to the Holy See
- In office September 2, 1993 – September 20, 1997
- President: Bill Clinton
- Preceded by: Thomas Patrick Melady
- Succeeded by: Lindy Boggs

Mayor of Boston
- In office January 2, 1984 – July 12, 1993
- Preceded by: Kevin White
- Succeeded by: Thomas Menino

49th President of the United States Conference of Mayors
- In office 1991–1992
- Preceded by: Robert M. Isaac
- Succeeded by: William Althaus

Boston City Councilor
- In office January 1978 – January 2, 1984
- Preceded by: Louise Day Hicks and John J. Kerrigan
- Succeeded by: N/A (number of at-large seats reduced)

Member of the Massachusetts House of Representatives
- In office January 1971 – January 1978 Serving with Michael F. Flaherty Sr. (1971–75)
- Preceded by: Royal L. Bolling (Note: his predecessor in holding the 6th Suffolk seat was Bolling; however his predecessors in representing the 7th Suffolk district were Royal L. Bolling and Dorris Bunte (who had represented the district until January 1975))
- Succeeded by: Elaine Noble (Note: his successor in holding the 7th Suffolk seat was Noble; his successor in the 6th Suffolk seat was Dorris Bunte, who assumed the seat in 1975)
- Constituency: 6th Suffolk (1971–75); 7th Suffolk (1975–78)

Personal details
- Born: Raymond Leo Flynn; July 22, 1939 (age 87) Boston, Massachusetts, U.S.
- Party: Democratic
- Spouse: Catherine Coyne
- Children: 6 (including Ed)
- Parent(s): Stephen Flynn; Lillian Kirby Flynn
- Education: Providence College (BA); Harvard University (MA)

Military service
- Allegiance: United States
- Branch/service: United States Army

Raymond Leo Flynn (born July 22, 1939) is an American politician and diplomat who served as the mayor of Boston, Massachusetts, from 1984 until 1993. He also served as United States Ambassador to the Holy See from 1993 to 1997. He also served as a member of the Massachusetts House of Representatives (1971–78) and the Boston City Council (1978–84)

Flynn was an All-American college basketball player at Providence College. During his senior year, Flynn was selected the "Most Valuable Player" in the 1963 National Invitation Tournament. After a brief professional basketball career, Flynn worked in several fields, including as a high school teacher and a probation officer, before entering politics. As a politician, Flynn was regarded to be an economic liberal and a cultural conservative. He began his political career as a Democratic member of the Massachusetts House of Representatives from 1971 to 1978, representing the South Boston neighborhood during the turbulent Boston desegregation busing crisis of the early 1970s. He opposed federally-mandated school busing. Throughout his political career, he held a strong anti-abortion position. As a state legislator, he co-authored the "Flynn–Doyle amendment" to ban government funding of abortions covered by Medicaid. This was initially successfully vetoed by Governor Michael Dukakis. However a version of the amendment was passed over Dukakis's veto in 1978. Flynn served on the Boston City Council from 1978 to 1984. As a city councilor, he stood in opposition to rate increases by utility companies and regularly proposed tenants' rights ordinances.

Flynn was elected mayor of Boston in 1983 and took office in 1984. Flynn was reelected in 1987 and 1991. Polls showed him to enjoy strong approval from Bostonians during his mayoralty. As mayor, he balanced the city's budget, eliminating a large budget deficit. To address the deficit, he lobbied heavily for the passage of a revenue package for the city in the Massachusetts Legislature to provide additional state aid to the city and the authorization for the city to raise new local taxes. In 1985, a revenue package was passed and signed into law by Governor Dukakis. In response to discriminatory practices studies found banks to be practicing in Boston, Flynn took actions which persuaded banks to reach a $400 million community reinvestment agreement with the city. Flynn succeeded in getting legislation passed to replace the city's publicly elected school board with the new Boston School Committee, members of which are appointed by the city's mayor. He would quickly come to express his regret about this change. In 1990, he faced strong criticism from Black leaders over the Boston Police Department's handling of the investigation into the murder of Carol Stuart. As mayor, Flynn advanced plans to desegregate the city's public housing, and made efforts to heal the city's racial divides. His mayoral administration granted neighborhood groups more of a voice in the use of the city's development and planning authorities in their neighborhoods. This included innovative move of granting the Dudley Street Neighborhood Initiative powers of eminent domain. He successfully fought to enact rent control laws and strong tenants' rights laws. He also served as president of the United States Conference of Mayors from 1991 to 1992.

Flynn resigned as mayor in 1993 in order to accept an appointment by President Bill Clinton as ambassador to the Holy See. He expanded the position's mission to involve participation in addressing problem areas around the world. During his tenure as ambassador, he also encountered some controversy. In 1998, he unsuccessfully ran for the United States House of Representatives. He later served as president of Catholic Alliance, a nonpartisan Catholic advocacy group.

== Early life and education ==
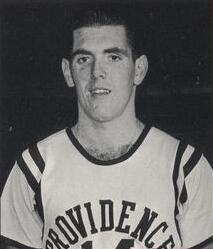
Flynn as a basketball player on the Providence Friars collegiate team

Flynn was born July 22, 1939, the son of Stephen Flynn and Lillian Flynn (née Kirby). He grew up in South Boston, where he has spent most of his life living. Flynn is Irish-American. His father was a union longshoreman, and his mother was a cleaning lady. Flynn's father was an immigrant to the United States. Flynn grew up a member of the Gate of Heaven Parish in South Boston.

As a kid, Flynn worked as a "ball boy" for the Boston Celtics basketball team during their home games at Boston Garden. He was a three-sport star athlete at South Boston High School.

Flynn attended Providence College on a basketball sports scholarship. Flynn was an All-American college basketball player at Providence College, and during his senior year was selected as the "most valuable player" in the 1963 National Invitation Tournament.

Later in life, while a Boston city councilor, Flynn would receive a master's degree in education from Harvard University in 1981.

== Early professions ==
In April 1963, he was selected by the Syracuse Nationals in the fourth round of the NBA draft. The Nationals relocated to Philadelphia to become the 76ers, but Flynn did not play for them, as he spent part of the 1963–64 season with the Wilmington Blue Bombers of the Eastern Professional Basketball League. Philadelphia traded his NBA rights to the Boston Celtics in September 1964, and in October he was the last player cut from the Celtics roster.

Flynn enlisted in the United States Army and was stationed at the Aberdeen Proving Ground in Maryland and Fort Dix in New Jersey. Before his political career, he worked as a youth worker, high school teacher, a probation officer, and a longshoreman. While working as a probation officer for the Suffolk County Superior Court from 1965 through 1970, he investigated criminal cases.

In his early political involvement, Flynn was a confidante and political supporter of U.S. House Speaker John W. McCormack, who was also a resident of South Boston. Flynn worked as a personal family assistant to Vice President Hubert Humphrey during Humphrey's campaign in the 1968 presidential election.

== Massachusetts House of Representatives (1971–1978) ==
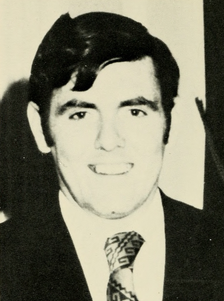
Flynn as a member of the Massachusetts House of Representatives

Capitalizing on his local sports hero celebrity, Flynn won election to the Massachusetts House of Representatives in November 1970. As a state representative, Flynn was generally representative of the views of his South Boston district's constituency. He was pro-trade unions, for affordable housing and tenants rights, opposed to redlining, opposed to expansion at Logan Airport, and opposed cutting welfare programs. Peter Dreier would later describe his positions as a state representative as having, largely, been a "parochial South Boston pol with progressive leanings." South Boston, which Flynn represented, was regarded to be relatively politically conservative.

=== Education policy and opposition to desegregation busing ===
Flynn was an opponent of court ordered desegregation busing. In 1973, he worked against implementing the city of Boston's desegregation school busing plan even filing a lawsuit against the Massachusetts Board of Education over the matter. Flynn argued that desegregation busing would pit poor Black and poor White families against one another within a second-tier school system, all while wealthy suburbanites sent their students to well-funded schools. Flynn refused to join the militant anti-busers, Louise Day Hicks and William Bulger when they released a statement of resistance that was seen as having racist overtones. Flynn urged against violent actions that were being taken by some in protest of busing. As a result of his refusal to join the more militant factions of resistance to busing, Flynn alienated himself from the more extremist factions of his community. His car was firebombed, and his family received death threats through telephone calls.

In 1974, Flynn filed legislation to repeal a state law which required that children attend school. During his 1983 mayoral campaign, he came to call this proposal a mistake. Flynn was a supporter of providing more state funding to special needs students in schools.

=== Ban on government funding of abortion ===
Flynn co-authored a bill to end government funding of abortions covered by Medicaid. The bill, co-authored with State Representative Charles R. Doyle. Public opponents of the bill founded of the Abortion Action Coalition advocacy organization, a short-lived organization which supported access to abortion. The bill was passed by the state legislature, but was successfully vetoed by Governor Michael Dukakis. Flynn and Doyle then, later that year, attached the bill as a rider to a state pay-raise bill which was passed by the Massachusetts State Legislature. This was again vetoed by Dukakis. The "Flynn-Doyle amendment" was successfully passed over Dukakis' veto in 1978, after Flynn had already left the legislature to serve on the Boston City Council.

The law was undercut in 1981, when the Massachusetts Supreme Judicial Court held that women with Medicaid eligibility had a constitutionally-protected entitlement to receive funding through the program for their abortions.

=== Unsuccessful 1975 campaigns for city office ===
In March 1975, Flynn announced himself as a candidate for the 1975 Boston mayoral election. However, he withdrew in June after struggling to fundraise and instead launched his candidacy for the Boston City Council. He would lose his race for city council that November, falling a mere 1,467 votes shy of election.

== Boston City Council (1978–1984) ==
Flynn was elected to the Boston City Council in November 1977. Flynn would be reelected in 1979 and 1981. In 1981, Flynn was the top vote-getter by a large margin. On the council, Flynn served as chairman of the Committee on Housing and Neighborhood Development, Committee on Government Relations and Government Finance, as well as the Special Committee on School Matters.

Peter Dreier would later describe Flynn as having transitioned as a city councilor, "from a parochial neighborhood politician with progressive leanings to a crusader with citywide appeal." while on the Boston City Council. Drier would describe Flynn as having been an "18-hour-a-day workaholic", and the "hardest working City Councilor". He had a reputation for regularly attending public meetings.

As a city councilor, Flynn opposed rate increases by utility companies. He was viewed as an ally of trade unions, welfare recipients, and working women. Flynn regularly proposed tenants' rights ordinances on the Boston City Council, which were defeated. Flynn believed that his city council colleagues were influenced by sizable donations from the real estate lobby, especially faulting the Greater Boston Real Estate Board. In 1983, Dudley Clendinen of The New York Times wrote of Flynn's politics,

Councilman Flynn, a resident of South Boston, opposed busing in the early days of desegregation. But he has evolved through the years into more of a populist, concerned with problems of housing, police protection in the face of rising crime and other needs of the elderly and poor.

Flynn supported the potential adoption of rent control. He supported the idea of implementing linkage fees that would require those developing large projects to provide a percentage of money to affordable housing. He also directed his attention to matters such as aircraft noise pollution and homelessness.

In October 1979, Flynn, together with Joseph F. Timilty, rescued a Black man from a threatening encounter with a White mob on the Boston Common. In 1982, Flynn and Bruce Bolling were the sole votes against the adoption of a map for the council's new district seats.

== 1983 mayoral election ==
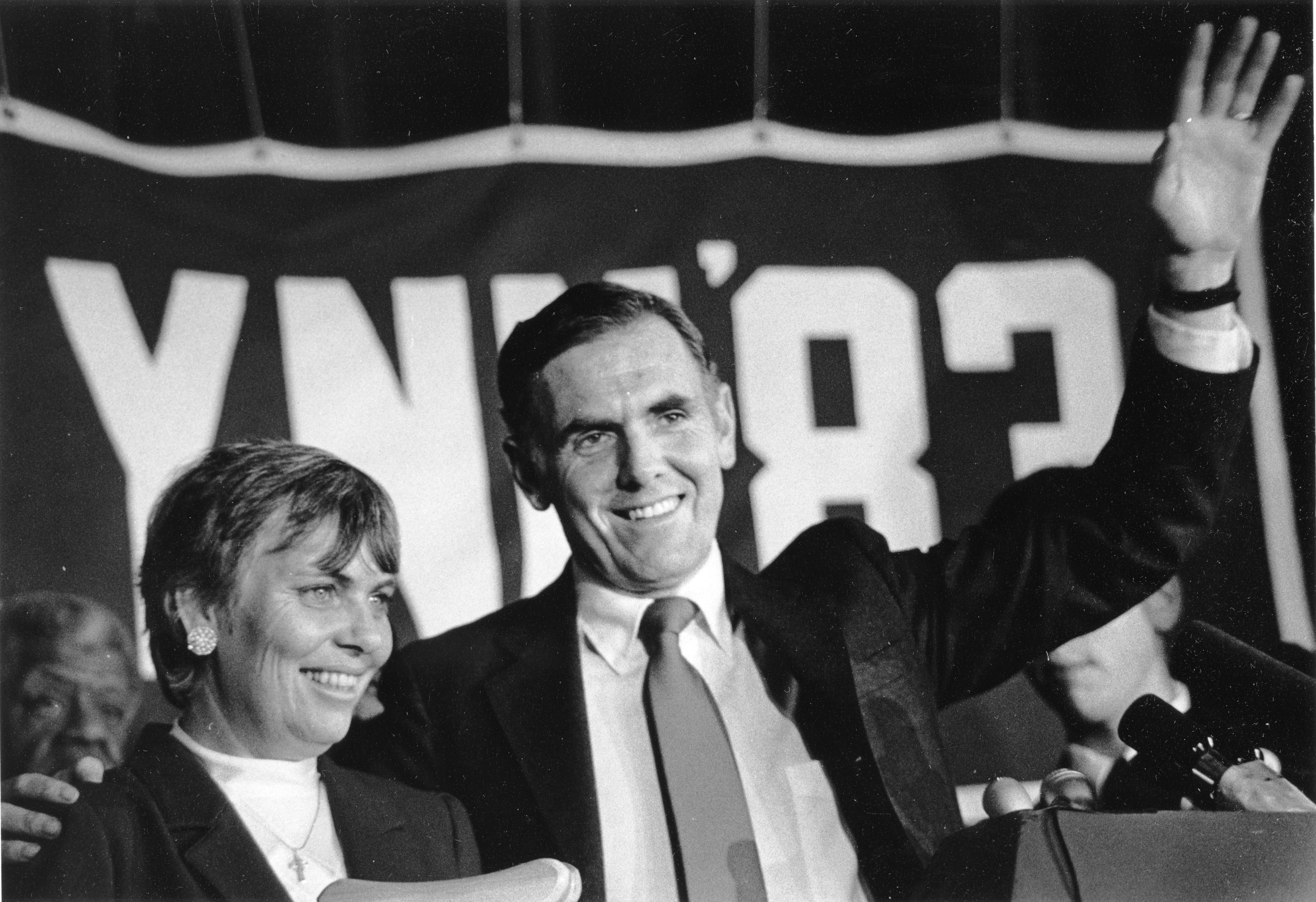
Flynn, with his wife Kathy, at his 1983 election night celebration

In April 1983, Flynn announced his candidacy for mayor of Boston. In the October nonpartisan primary election, Flynn and State Representative Mel King placed atop the results, advancing to the general election. King was the first African American to be a candidate in a Boston mayoral general election. Both Flynn and King had originally been viewed as underdogs in the primary election. Flynn defeated King in the general election. Flynn and King had known each other since childhood, meeting through both playing basketball, and had both served as state representatives at the same time and worked together there on legislation. They would ultimately have a lifelong friendship, despite having run against each other for mayor.

Flynn's campaign received no significant financial support from major sectors of the city's business community. Flynn outright refused to accept campaign donations from developers with projects pending before city agencies, or lawyers of such developers. Both the Flynn and King campaigns had low expenditures compared to the nearly $2 million campaign that outgoing mayor Kevin White and the political machine supporting him had spent on his candidacies in the 1975 and 1979 mayoral elections. Flynn's campaign spent roughly $400,000, while King's spent less than $350,000.

Dudley Clendinen wrote that Flynn had worked to establish himself as a champion of the poor and elderly and to appeal across ethnic lines to ethnic minority voters. While Flynn had earlier in his political career opposed gay rights issues, by the time of his mayoral campaign he was making an active effort to court the gay vote. At the time, gay communities across the United States were becoming more politically organized.

In the election, both Flynn and King worked to build progressive coalitions, and both pledged to dedicate themselves to working across ethnic divides in the city. In the five weeks leading up to the general election, the two candidates held more than fifty local neighborhood debates. The campaign was peaceful, and only a handful of isolated racial violence incidents occurred during it.

== Mayoralty (1984–1993) ==
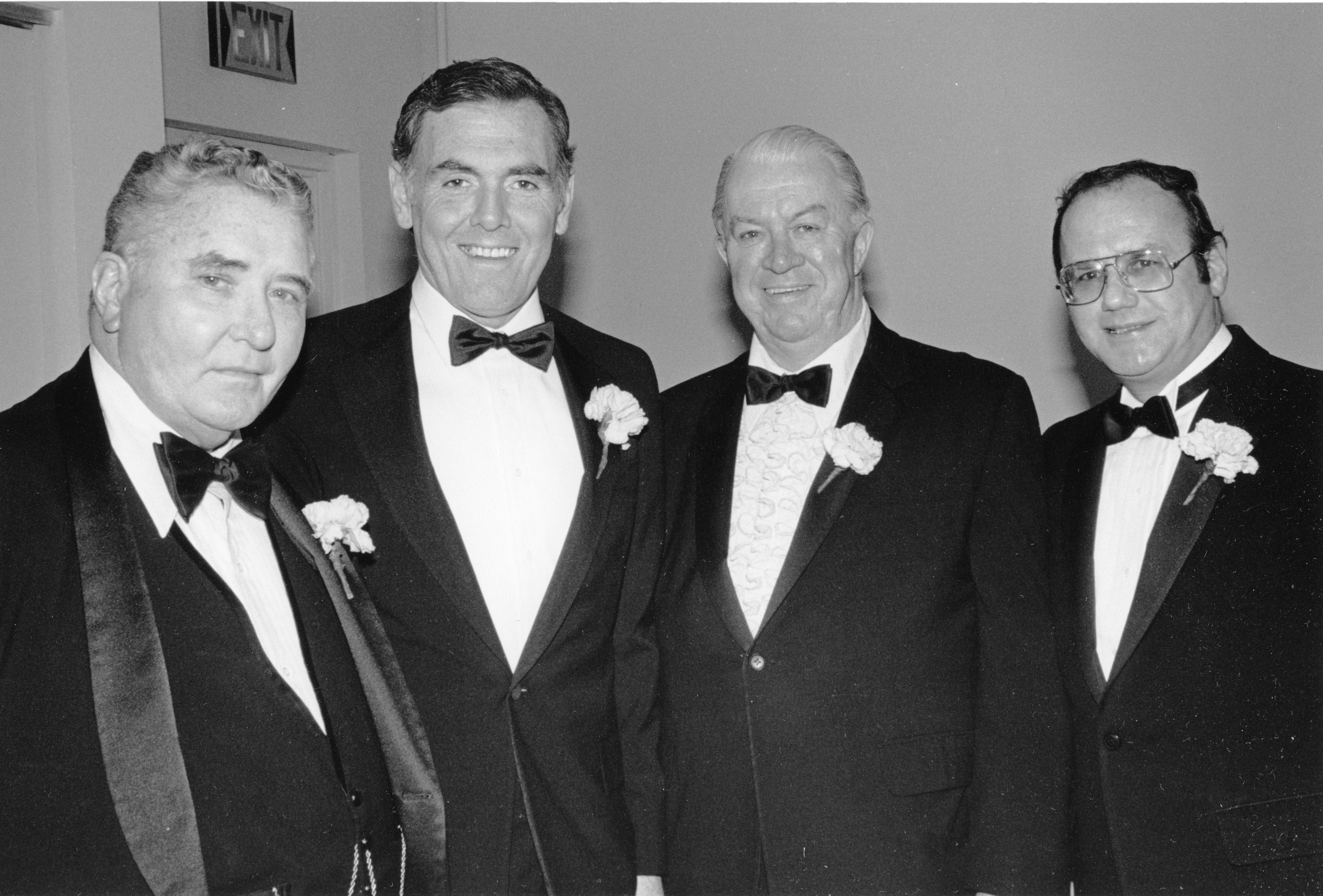
Flynn, second from left, next to Boston City Council members Dapper O'Neil and James M. Kelly (circa 1984–1987)

Flynn served as mayor from his inauguration on January 2, 1984 until his resignation on July 12, 1993. During his tenure, Flynn was regarded to be a popular mayor, which was reflected in high approval ratings. In 1992, Fox Butterfield of The New York Times called Flynn "one of the most popular mayors in [Boston]'s history". As mayor, Flynn maintained a prominent public profile. In 1984, journalist Colman McCarthy described Flynn as having a "blazonry of political zeal that makes him one of the nation's most attractive Democrats."

In 1998, Jack W. Germond and Jules Witcover of The Baltimore Sun wrote that, as mayor, Flynn had, "built a national reputation as an advocate for the homeless and a local reputation as a hands-on politician who showed up at every fire or police emergency."

At the time that Flynn was preparing to leave office, in an article published in The Christian Science Monitor, George B. Merry described Flynn as a mayor whose "hands-on" approach had made him, "one of the most visible mayors in Boston history." He considered Flynn's leadership to have delivered mixed results. Merry described Flynn's leadership-style as being heavily focused on neighborhood-level quality of life issues.

=== General politics ===
==== Reelection campaigns ====
Flynn was re-elected mayor in 1987 and 1991, winning more than two-thirds of the vote each time. In his reelections, he won a higher vote share in Black and Hispanic areas of the city than he did in White areas. In 1987, Flynn carried every ward of the city except for in his native South Boston. His failure to carry South Boston was perhaps due to his promise weeks before the election to desegregate all-white Boston Housing Authority developments in South Boston. Flynn's 1991 campaign for a third term came despite a 1981 campaign promise to only serve two terms. In his 1991 campaign, he ran a low-profile campaign that he touted as being "grassroots", and ran no television or radio advertisements. He centered his candidacy on ties to the city's neighborhoods and his successes in balancing the city's budget.

==== State, national, and international politics ====
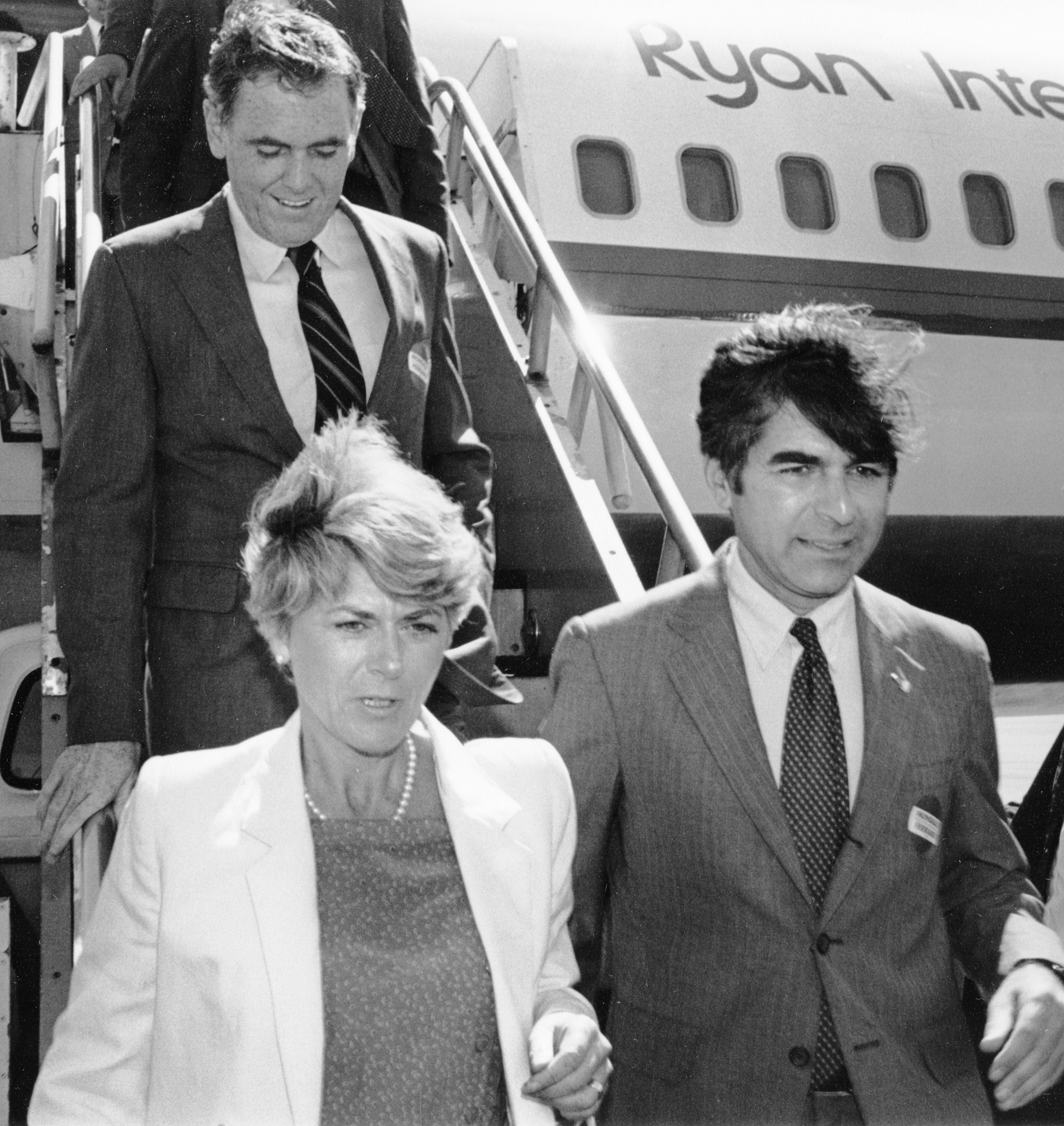
Flynn and Governor Michael Dukakis campaigning with Democratic vice presidential nominee Geraldine Ferraro before the 1984 presidential election

Flynn considered running in the 1990 Massachusetts gubernatorial election, but, due to police controversies, his struggling relationship with the minority community, and his anti-abortion stance, he ruled out a run.

Flynn became a national leader on urban matters. In 1987, as chair of the United States Conference of Mayors' Task Force on Hunger and Homelessness, Flynn advocated for the passage of the McKinney–Vento Homeless Assistance Act. Flynn served as president of the United States Conference of Mayors during 1991–92.

Flynn visited South Africa several times to see anti-apartheid figure Nelson Mandela when he was in prison. In June 1990, four months after Mandela's release from prison, Flynn welcomed him to Boston on a trip Mandela took visiting many cities in the United States.

Ahead of the 1992 United States presidential election, there was some talk about whether Flynn could be a prospective vice presidential running mate on a Democratic ticket. In February 1992, Flynn unsuccessfully urged New York Governor Mario Cuomo to run in the presidential election. It took Flynn a while to grow warm to the Democratic Party's ultimate presidential nominee, Bill Clinton. He endorsed Clinton in late June 1992. Flynn, a lifelong anti-abortion activist, played a role in drawing the anti-abortion ("pro-life") Catholic vote to pro-abortion rights Bill Clinton in the general election. Flynn physically campaigned on Clinton's behalf in roughly half of the nation's states. Despite opposition to gun control measures earlier in his political career, as mayor Flynn supported such policy, heavily campaigning in support of the passage of the Brady Bill.

=== Economic and fiscal matters ===
In 1989, two studies, including one by the Boston Redevelopment Authority, found the city's major banks to be discriminating in practices regarding mortgage lending, personnel hiring, and where they located their branches. In collaboration with community activists, Flynn raised a more than year-long campaign to pressure banks to change their practices. He also announced a plan to issue a regular city-sponsored "report card" on bank practices. He also adopted a "linked deposit" policy to have the city then withdraw funds from banks that received poor track records on these "report cards" to expand its deposits in banks which worked to meet the needs of the city's neighborhoods. As a consequence, the banks reached a $400 million community reinvestment agreement with the city, in which the banks promised to open new branches, change lending and hiring practices, and to collaborate more closely with community development corporations and community groups.

The state, at the time, viewed the city government as wasteful and inefficient. Flynn successfully lobbied for the 1985 passage of a revenue package which Governor Dukakis signed into law. When Flynn took office, the city had a $40 million deficit. Flynn was able to balance the city's budget each year he was in office and improved the fiscal controls of the city. He was able to improve the city's bond rating each year he was in office. When he left office, the city had its highest bond rating in its history. To address the city's deficit, upon taking office, Flynn worked to receive additional state aid and state legislature authorization to raise new local taxes.

The city's economy was regarded to have significantly rebounded over the course of Flynn's mayoralty.

=== Education ===
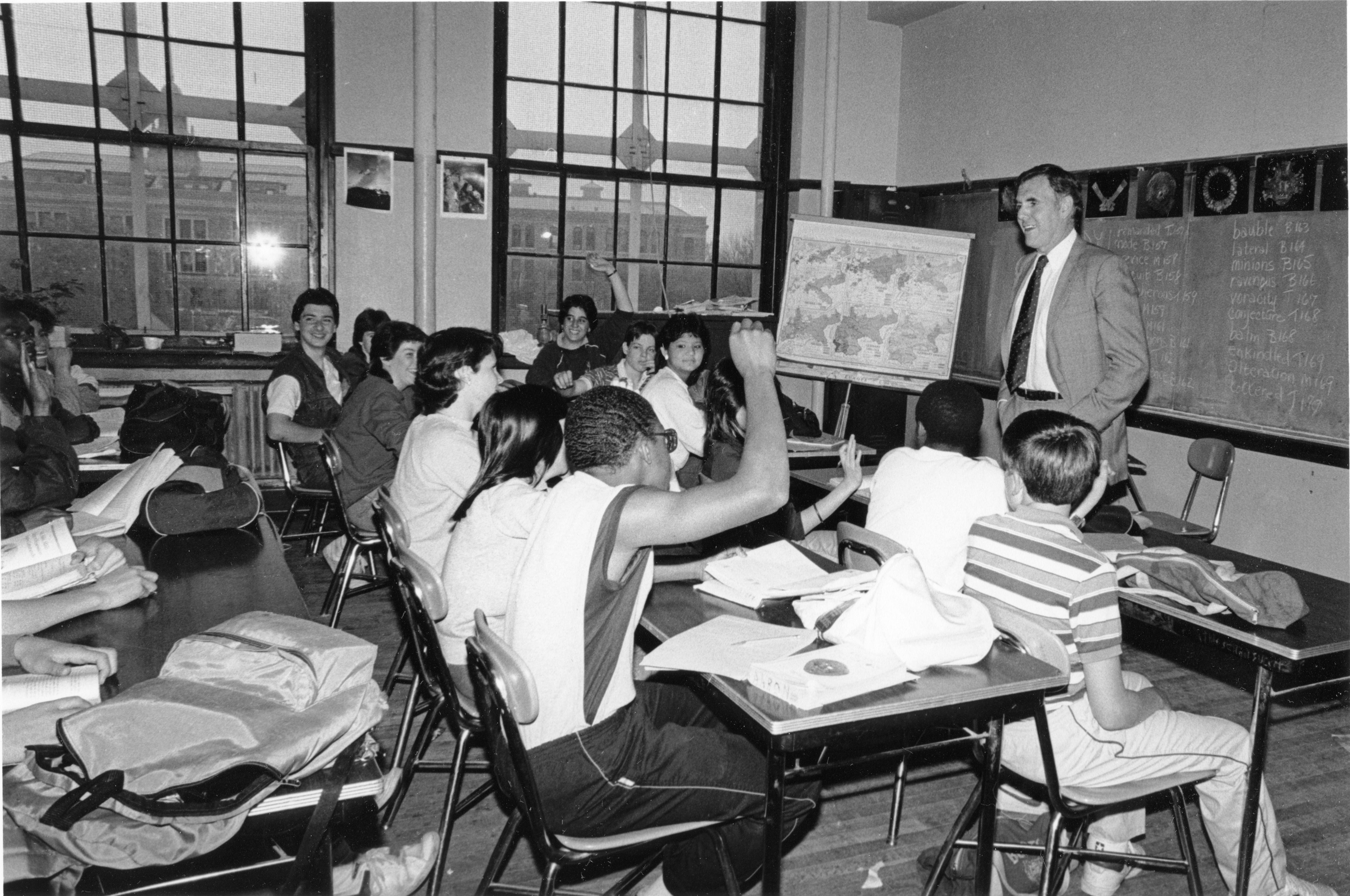
Flynn speaks to children in a classroom (circa 1984–1987)

In 1993, George B. Merry wrote that while Flynn had "vastly upgraded" the city's public school system as mayor, at the time of Flynn's departure from the mayoralty, the school district, "appear[ed] to be facing an uncertain future."}

In July 1991, Flynn won a fight to turn Boston School Committee from an elected school board to one whose members are appointed by the mayor. This change took effect in January 1992. Before this change, the elected school board had come to be regarded as fractious. As he approached his departure as mayor in 1993, Flynn questioned whether the change had been a wise decision, and ultimately voiced regret for having initiated it. Boston still remains the only municipality in Massachusetts without an elected school board.

=== Public safety, law enforcement, race relations ===
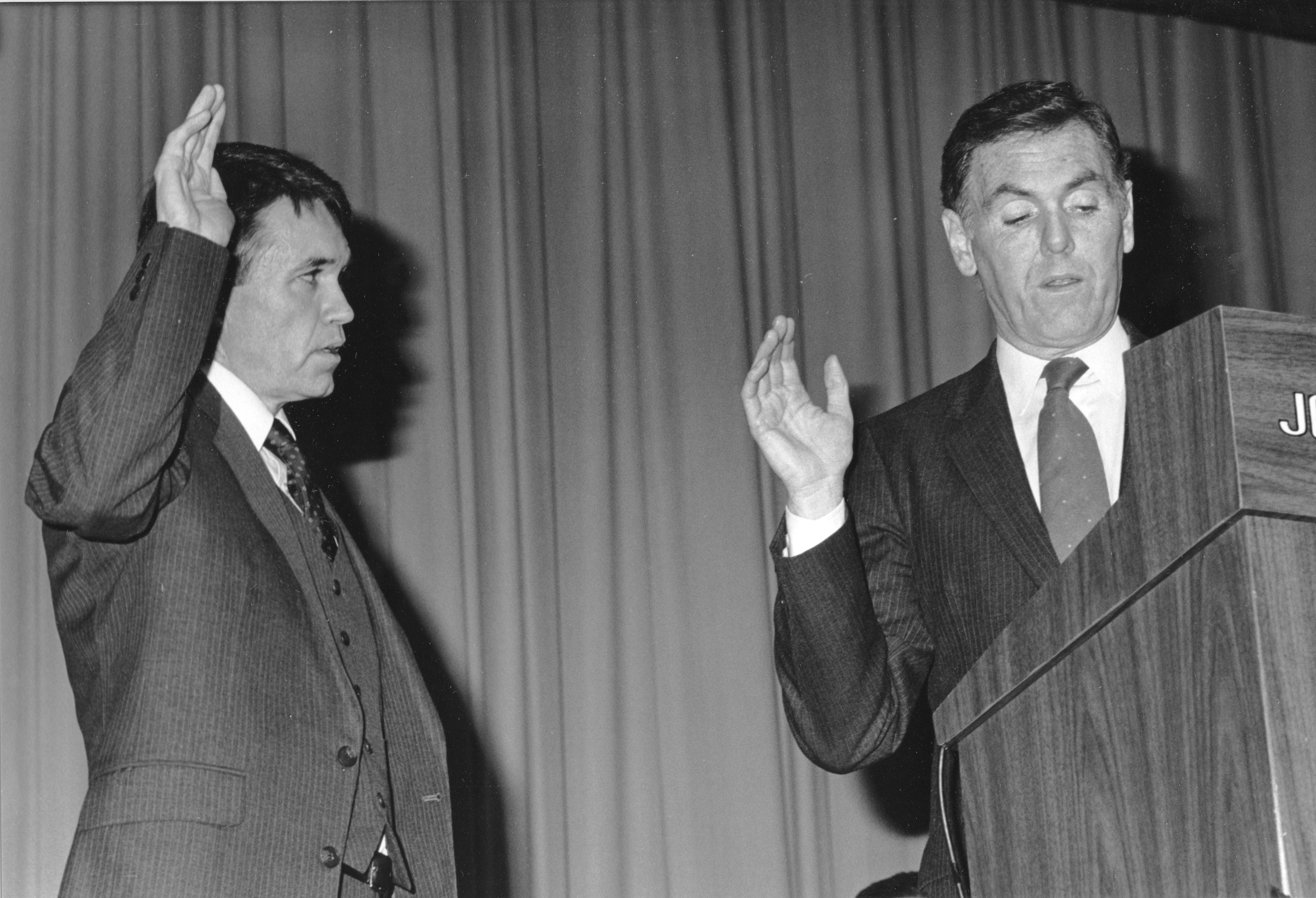
Flynn swearing-in Francis Roache as police commissioner in 1985

In 1990, Flynn received strong criticism from Black leaders over the city police's handling of the investigation into the murder of Carol Stuart, including the arrest and intensive search of William Bennett. Flynn had instructed for a citywide manhunt for murderer after the killing. Decades later, in 2023, then-mayor Michelle Wu apologized on behalf of the city for the impact that police conduct in the investigation Stuart's murder had upon the African-American community in the city, especially in Mission Hill. Her apology was directly addressed to Bennett as well as Alan Swanson, both of whom she acknowledged had been wrongly treated as suspects.

In response to concerns over the police department (including those stemming from the investigation into Carol Stuart's murder), in May 1991, Flynn empaneled the St. Clair Commission, headed by James D. St. Clair. In January 1992, the St. Clair Commission released its report, which was critical of the Boston Police Department for mismanagement, and urged against reappointing Police Commissioner Francis Roache when his term expired that April. Roache had been appointed by Flynn in 1985, and was a childhood friend of Flyn who was one of hiscloset associates during his mayoralty. However, when his term expired, Flynn instead appointed William Bratton to serve as police commissioner.

At the end of Flynn's tenure, in 1993, George B. Merry observed that crime in the city remained "a continuing problem".

Before Flynn took office, Boston had seen a very high level of racial tensions in the 1970s. As mayor, Flynn took steps to racially integrate public housing complexes. Retrospectively, in 2023 Michael Jonas of Commonwealth magazine wrote that, as mayor, Flynn went "to great lengths to promote racial harmony and heal divisions, not inflame them."

=== Urban development ===
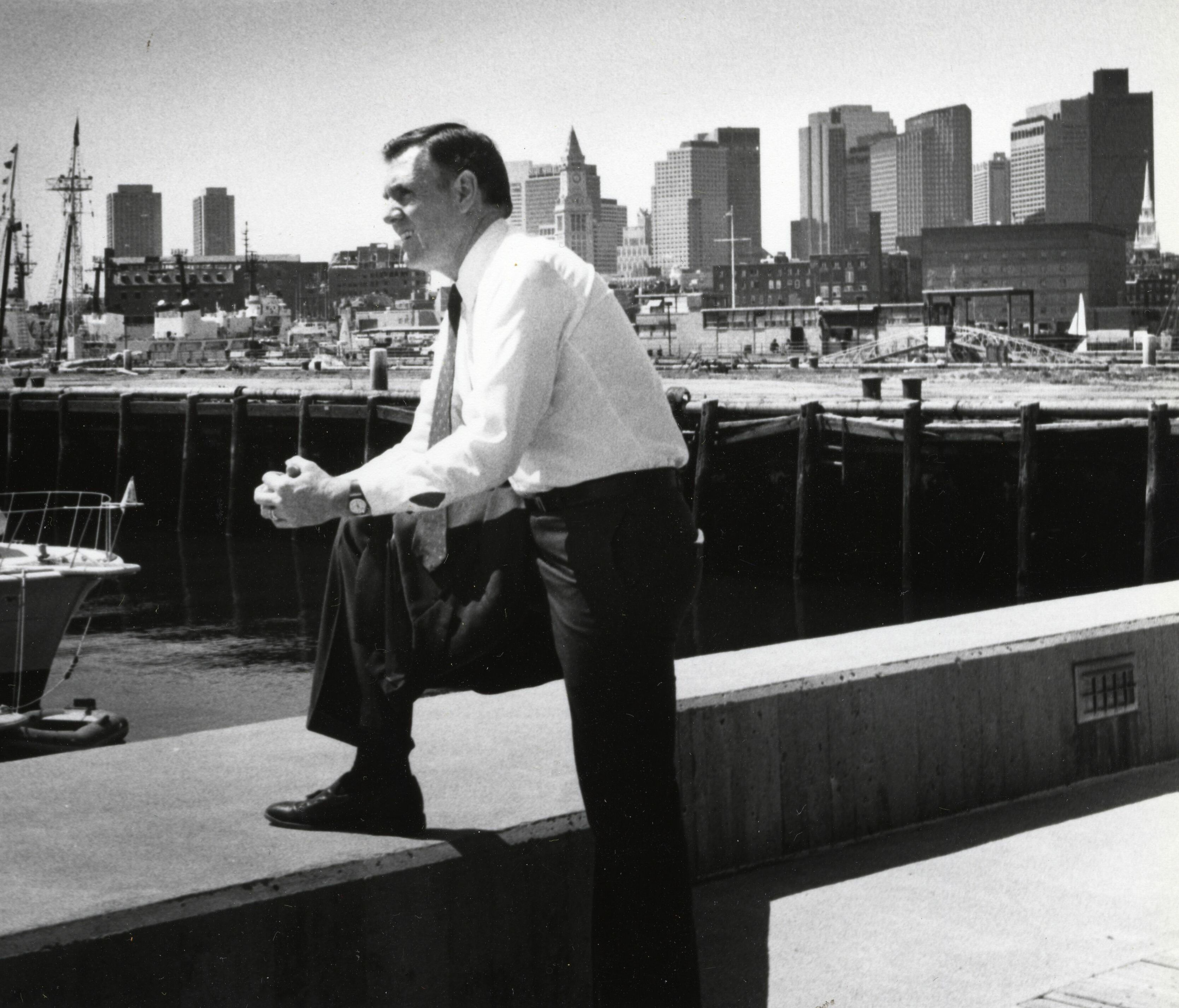
Flynn at the Boston waterfront (circa 1984–1987)

Flynn took office amid a period of urban flight by the city's middle class. Peter Dreier would describe Flynn as having been elected "with a populist mandate to 'share the prosperity' of Boston's downtown economic boom—particularly in terms of jobs and housing—with the city's poor and working-class residents." Flynn had campaigned for office in his initial election on a housing-focused platform. When he took office, downtown real estate developers were highly worried by his populist agenda. Flynn opted not to socialize with real estate developers, and refused to take political contributions from developers that had projects being considered by the city government.

During Flynn's mayoralty, the city had a strong development market, and he was regarded to be a "pro-development" mayor. He focused on addressing the quality of life in neighborhoods, as well as on addressing gentrification. During his mayoralty, the city built what was at the time an unprecedented number of new units of affordable housing. His administration successfully prevailed against the political forces of the local real estate industry to enact a policy that doubled the linkage fee funds that downtown developers were required to provide to neighborhood housing funds. Over the course of his mayoralty, this fund received over $70 million, and aided in the city's addition of over 8,000 further units of affordable housing. Flynn also prevailed further heated political fight, and was able to enact legislation imposing rent control and stronger tenants' rights; with both of these aefforts putting him at odds with landlords. During Flynn's administration, the city's development director Steve Coyle oversaw the institution of controversial "downzoning" growth management safeguards aimed at combatting the "Manhattanization" of the city's historic downtown and neighborhoods. Despite the addition of new affordable housing and rent control measures, the price of housing in Boston significantly increased over the course of Flynn's mayoralty.

Flynn's administration collaborated on development with nonprofit organizations. The Flynn administration provided neighborhood groups significant influence in planning and development decisions, as well as other matters. A very notable example of collaboration saw the city government delegate its own urban renewal powers (including eminent domain authority) to the Dudley Street Neighborhood Initiative, a community group in the Roxbury neighborhood who are allowed to use that authority in parts of the neighborhood.

=== Resignation and succession ===
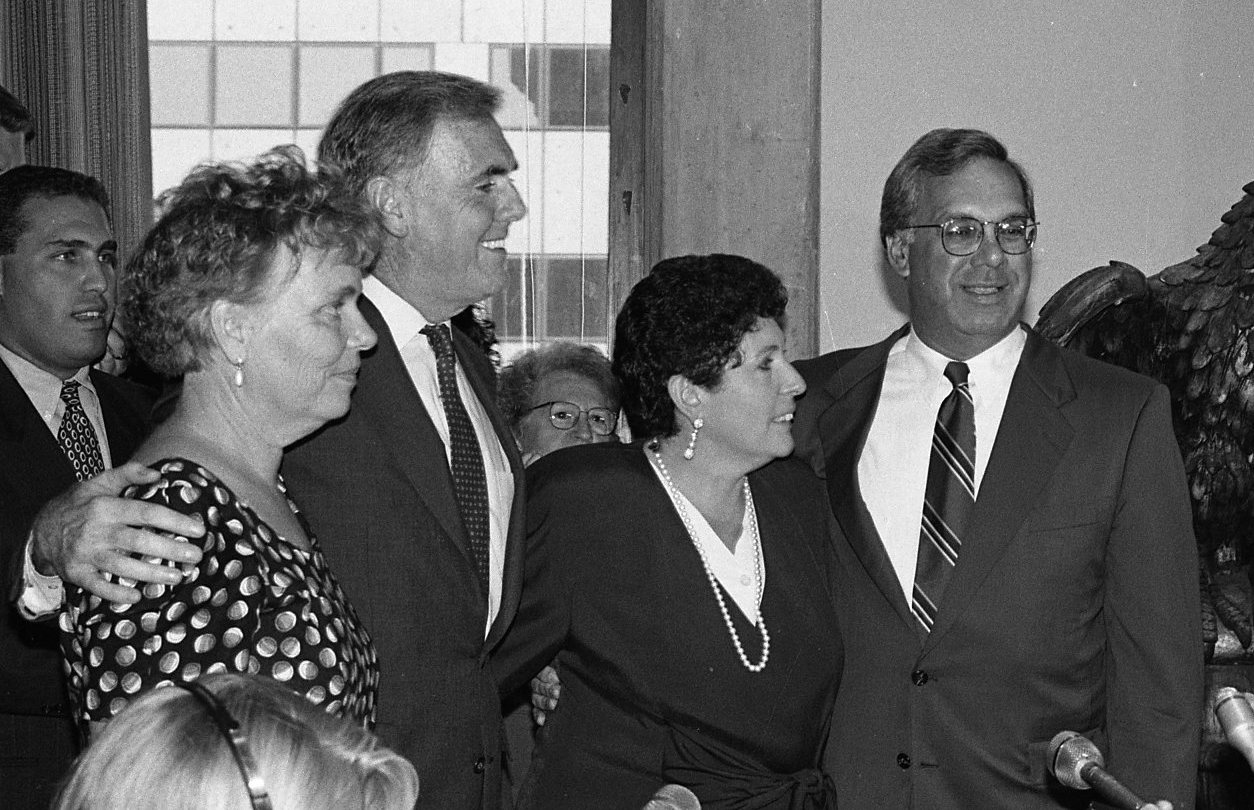
Flynn and his wife, Kathy, attending the ceremonial swearing-in of Thomas Menino as acting mayor

In 1993, Flynn resigned during his third term as mayor when he was appointed by Clinton to serve as United States Ambassador to the Holy See (the Vatican). Flynn was nominated in March 1993, and announced he would be resigning as mayor. However, in June, he reconsidered whether he would accept the role. He met with President Clinton and United States State Department officials to better define what his role would be as ambassador. The Senate unanimously confirmed his appointment that month, and he resigned as mayor on July 12, 1993.

Upon the announcement of Flynn's nomination, it became anticipated that then-Boston City Council President Thomas Menino was, per the city charter, going to assume the office of "acting mayor" upon Flynn's expected resignation. Flynn had had a longtime friendship with Menino. However, their relationship was noted to have become somewhat terser during the period in which Flynn was preparing to hand over the office to Menino. One cause for their rift was that, after Menino had promised he would appoint 100 new police officers when he took office, Flynn beat him to the chase and did so himself, which angered Menino.

When Flynn resigned on July 12, 1993, Menino became acting mayor. Menino would go on to win the 1993 Boston mayoral election, becoming mayor.

== Ambassador to the Holy See (1993–1997) ==
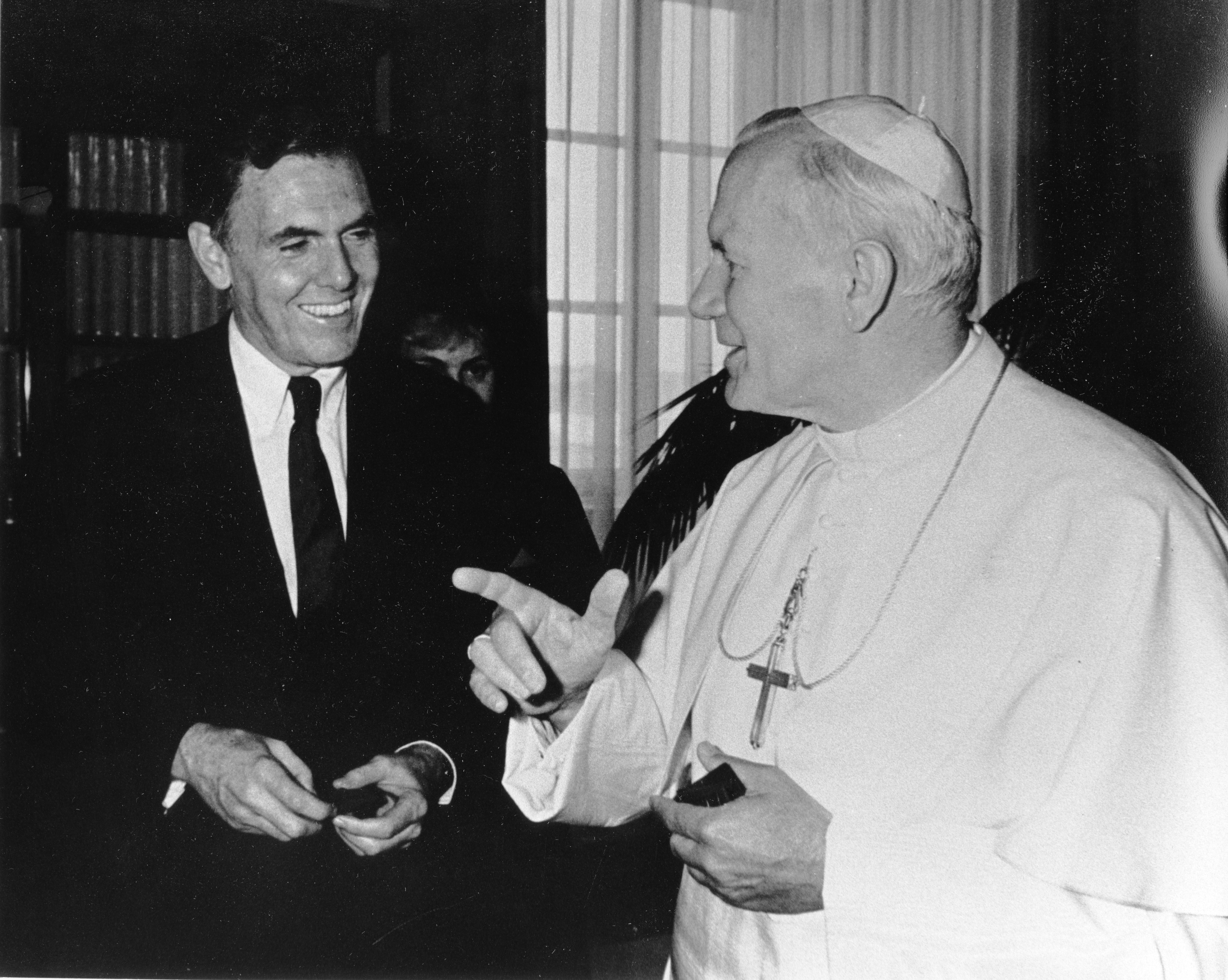
Flynn with Pope John Paul II in 1993

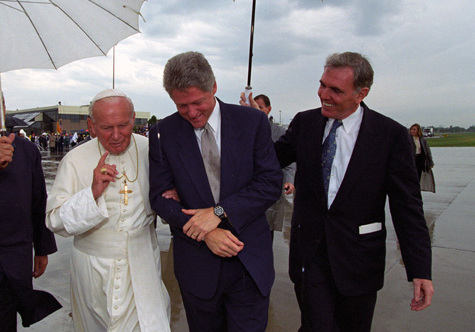
Ambassador-designate Flynn (right) accompanies Pope John Paul II (left) and President Clinton (center) during the pope's arrival at Stapleton International Airport for the 1993 World Youth Day celebration in Denver, Colorado

Flynn served as Ambassador Extraordinary and Plenipotentiary to the Holy See from September 2, 1993, through September 20, 1997. He was the first member of the Democratic Party to hold this post. He was appointed on July 1, 1993, and presented his credentials on September 2, 1993.

Clinton had Flynn expand the role of the post's mission. Flynn not only represented the United States to the Holy See, but also represented the United States in imperiled areas around the world on matters of social justice and economic justice. Flynn helped lead relief efforts related to an earthquake in India, and was involved in humanitarian aid efforts to nations such as Bosnia and Herzegovina, Haiti, Kenya, Somalia, Sudan, and Uganda. He was also involved in efforts to broker the Good Friday Agreement. He also collaborated with the Holy See on efforts to resolve problems in various areas of the world. He also played a key role in brokering an agreement to start a formal process to have Israel and the Holy See establish formal relations with each other. Flynn's tenure was somewhat shaky, however. In 1998, Jack W. Germond and Jules Witcover of The Baltimore Sun described his tenure as, "unorthodox and controversial." Flynn twice received reprimands from the United States Department of State: in one instance for publicly discussing domestic American policy, and in the other instance for having an employee of the embassy manage Flynn's family's finances.

At the time he accepted the position of ambassador, Flynn made it known that he intended to eventually return to politics, likely running for another public office. While ambassador, Flynn considered running for governor of Massachusetts in 1994 to unseat incumbent Republican Bill Weld. However, Flynn announced in April 1994 that he would not run in the 1994 gubernatorial election.

During his time as ambassador, the campaign committee for Flynn's mayoral candidacies was subject to federal and state investigation. In February 1996, Flynn plead to having misused campaign funds during his tenure as mayor and agreed to repay $12,500 in funds to his campaign committee. The state of Massachusetts' attorney general was considering bringing a civil lawsuit against Flynn regarding these funds. Douglas deRusha, the former bookkeeper for Flynn's mayoral campaign committee, went to prison for embezzlement. Coincidentally, the same month that Flynn plead to having misused campaign funds, an unrelated investigation resulted in Flynn's former top-aide during his mayoralty, Joseph Fisher, pleading guilty for having failed to report more than $51,000 that he had received as bribes and illegal favors during his seven years serving special assistant to Flynn during Flynn's mayoralty. Both investigations generated negative publicity for Flynn.

In early 1997, eying leaving his post, Flynn made an effort to become a university athletic director, reaching out to Boston-area universities such as Northeastern University. His mayoral successor, Thomas Menino, attempted to help persuade Boston-area universities to hire Flynn for such a position. This effort was to no avail, however. Shortly thereafter, Massachusetts Governor Bill Weld, who had already expressed interest in appointing Flynn to an unpaid position on a state commission, expressed interest in potentially offering Flynn a paid position in his gubernatorial administration. In early September 1997, Flynn shared his intent to run for governor of Massachusetts in 1998. Two weeks later, Flynn announced his intent to resign his post as ambassador. Flynn left his post on September 20, 1997.

On October 3, 1997, The Boston Globe published an article which both accused Flynn of having been a sub-par diplomat as ambassador and of having had a longtime drinking problem. The article included a reporter's claim to have, firsthand, witnessed Flynn walking around Boston while seemingly drunk while visiting the city on break from his ambassadorial duties on August 6, 1997. Flynn attributed the article to the paper's opposition to his planned 1998 gubernatorial campaign and also to contempt for his "class, religion and ethnic background." This article was seen as hurting Flynn's public image. Flynn defended himself in an interviewed aired by 60 Minutes in April 1998.

== 1998 congressional campaign ==
Following his service as ambassador, Flynn considered running for governor of Massachusetts in 1998. Flynn made public in January 1998 his intent to later that year launch his candidacy. However, obstacles, such as a lack of financial campaign reserves and the political challenge of running for governor in the state of Massachusetts with a strong anti-abortion stance like his, dissuaded him. Another factor that made his candidacy challenging was the perceived difficulty of winning statewide with a political identity so strongly tied to the city of Boston. Flynn's ambition of being elected governor was regarded as being a longshot.

Instead of running for governor, after Joseph P. Kennedy II announced his intent not to seek an additional congressional term, Flynn decided to run in the 1998 election for Massachusetts's 8th congressional district seat that Kennedy would be vacating. Flynn formally announced his candidacy in June 1998. In September, Flynn lost in the Democratic primary election (the real contest in the heavily Democratic district) to Somerville Mayor Mike Capuano, who went on to win the general election. Flynn placed second with roughly 18% of the vote.

Flynn was the only anti-abortion candidate of the ten running in the primary, and his campaign advertising utilized photos of him with Pope John Paul II and Mother Teresa. Flynn had run a quiet grassroots campaign operation. Flynn was endorsed by the local chapters of the International Longshoremen's Association and Iron Workers unions. Flynn had been regarded as an early front-runner in the primary, and private and public opinion polls had shown him to be leading. However, polls show that Capuano enjoyed a last-minute rise in support that resulted in his victory over Flynn.

Ceci Connolly of The Washington Post observed during the campaign,

In this era of "third way," suburban, New Democrat politics, Flynn's New Deal, patronage-oriented, urban populism may have outgrown its welcome even here in the bosom of liberalism. The triple-decker houses once bulging with large ethnic families are now occupied by yuppies for whom the name Flynn is just a distant memory...While some candidates attempt to repackage themselves or tack with the political winds, Flynn is adamantly retro – hoping the style and themes that worked so well nearly two decades ago can deliver one more victory.

== Later career ==
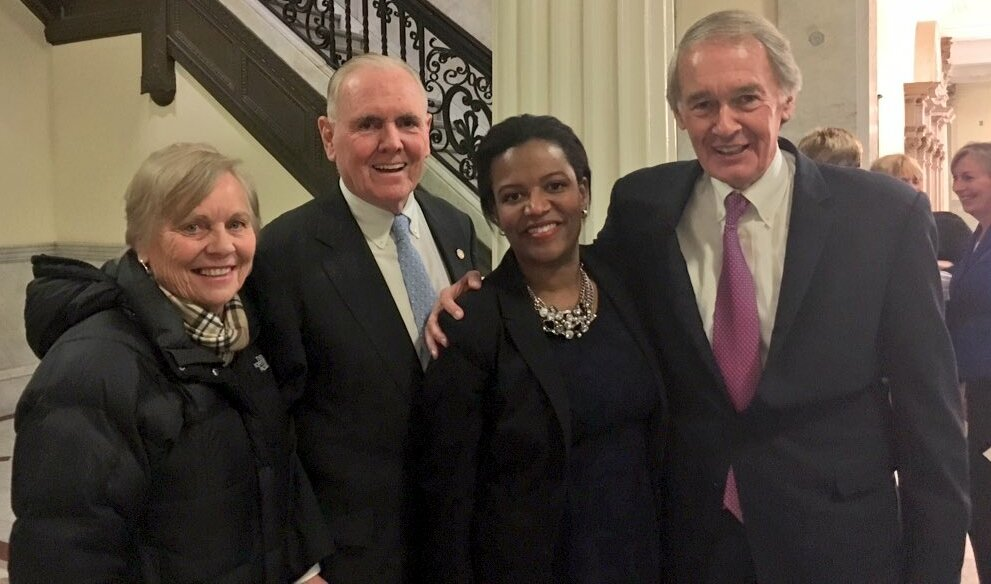
L–R: Kathy Flynn, Raymond Flynn, State Senator Linda Dorcena Forry, and U.S. Senator Ed Markey at the 2016 State of the Union Address

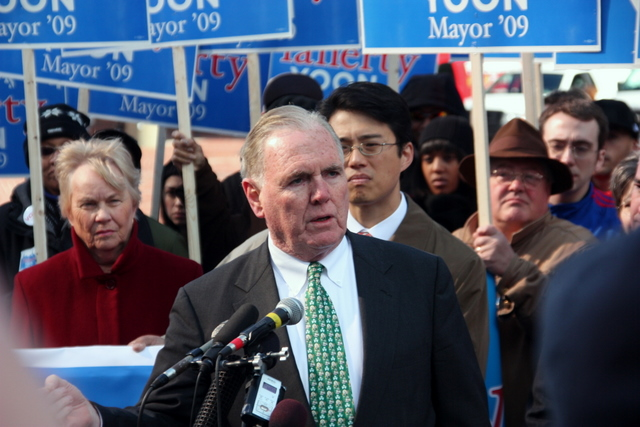
Flynn endorsing Michael Flaherty in the 2009 Boston mayoral election (with Flaherty's "runningmate" Sam Yoon and Flynn's wife Kathy both visible behind Flynn)

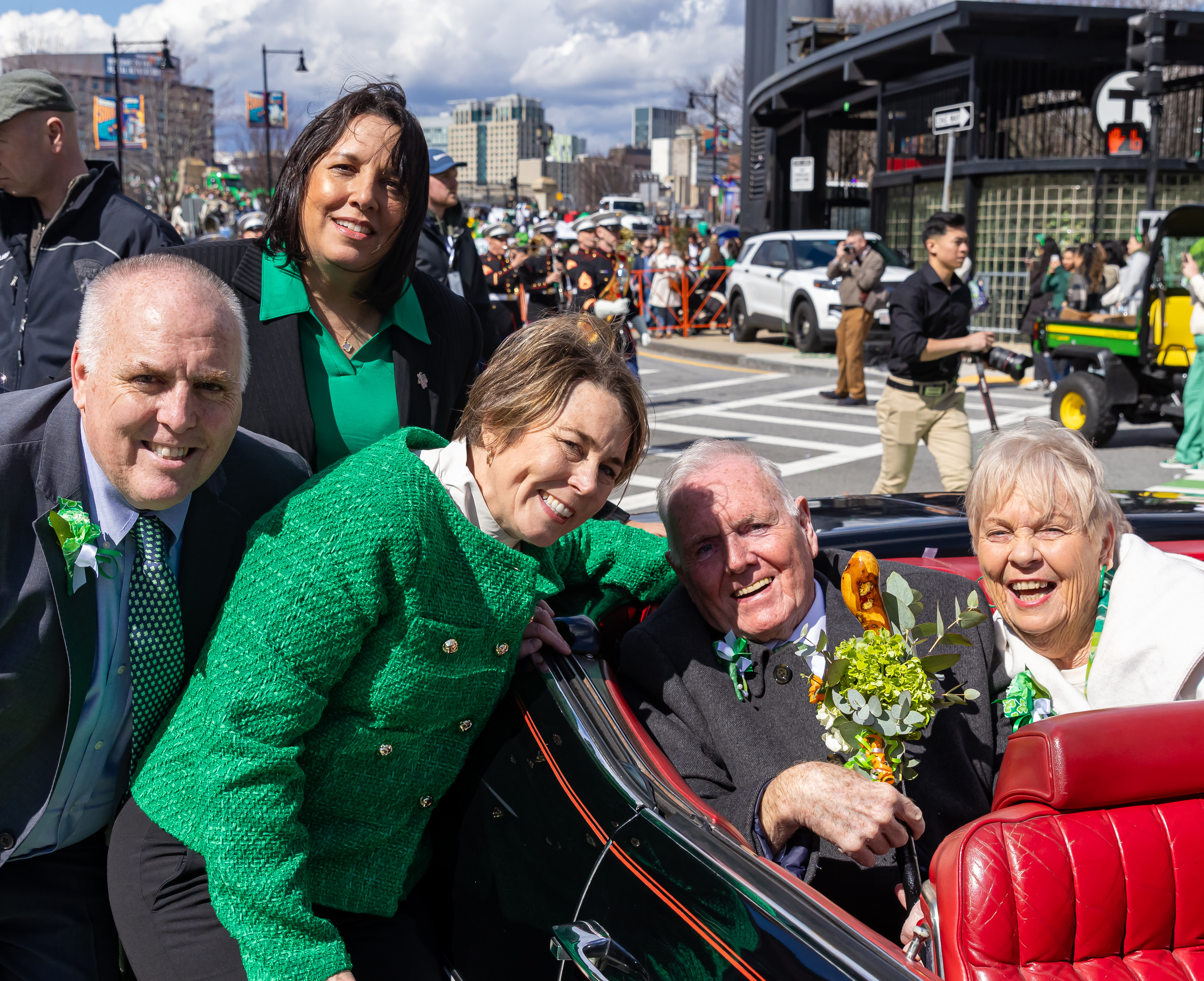
Flynn and others at the 2024 South Boston Saint Patrick's Day Parade Front row L–R: Flynn's son, Ed (a Boston city councilman); Governor Maura Healey; Flynn; and Flynn's wife, Kathy Back row: Lieutenant Governor Kim Driscoll

In 2001, for several weeks Flynn openly explored a possible run in that year's special election to succeed Joe Moakley as the congressman from Massachusetts's 9th congressional district. However, in mid-June 2001, Flynn ruled out such a run and threw his support behind a potential candidacy by State Senator Stephen Lynch, who ultimately ran and won the election.

While he has not run for office again himself, Flynn subsequently maintained some involvement in politics and related matters. In 2004, Flynn unsuccessfully pursued litigation to reverse the Massachusetts Supreme Judicial Court ruling that had, earlier that year, legalized same-sex marriage in Massachusetts. During the general election campaign of the 2009 Boston mayoral election, Flynn and his one-time mayoral opponent Mel King both came together to endorse Michael Flaherty's campaign against Thomas Menino. In the 2000 presidential election, Flynn and the Catholic Alliance organization that he headed endorsed the Republican of George W. Bush and Dick Cheney. In 2010, Flynn again crossed party lines to vote for the successful candidacy of Republican nominee Scott Brown for the United States Senate. In 2012, Flynn appeared in television ads supporting Brown for reelection. He also voiced support for Mitt Romney, that year's Republican nominee for president. He has also continued to comment on United States relations with the Holy See. In 2009, he responded critically to rumors that President Barack Obama might be considering Caroline Kennedy for Flynn's former post as ambassador. He opined that Kennedy's pro-choice abortion stance would make her unbefitting to serve as ambassador to the Holy See. In 2013, he criticized plans to relocate the Embassy of the United States to the Holy See to a building that would be adjacent to the Embassy of the United States to Italy.

Flynn involved himself in media after concluding his career in public office. In 1998, he had a role as a radio host on WRKO in Boston. In September 2014, he became a regular contributor to The Pilot, the official newspaper of the Roman Catholic Archdiocese of Boston. In February 2017, Flynn became a columnist for the Boston Herald.

In 1999, Flynn became president of Catholic Alliance, a nonpartisan Catholic advocacy group. In this role, while remaining a Democrat, he and the Catholic Alliance endorsed George W. Bush in the 2000 presidential election. Flynn also became president of another Catholic political advocacy organization, Your Catholic Voice. He later started Catholic Citizenship, serving as its national chairman. He cited the organization as arising from conversations he had with a figure in national Catholic activism that affirmed in Flynn the importance of his message relating to adhering to Catholic teachings above partisan political concerns. Beginning in 2004, he also served on the advisory board of Catholics for the Common Good, a lay apostolate for evangelization of culture.

In 2013, Flynn voiced his public agreement with the Jamaica Plain Neighborhood Council's position in its lawsuit against a developer and the city. The neighborhood council was suing over what it contended was a wrongful grant of a zoning variance. The lawsuit was locally controversial. The case was dismissed by a judge over lack of standing, disputing the neighborhood council's assertion that it could be considered a "government body".

In 2024, Flynn endorsed Erin Murphy's unsuccessful campaign in the Democratic primary for clerk of the Suffolk Supreme Judicial Court. This primary election was regarded to have served as a prominent proxy battle the city's progressive politicians and its city's more conservative "old guard", with many prominent progressives endorsing the victorious Allison Cartwright and many of prominent practitioners of (more conservative) "old-school" Boston politics endorsing Murphy. The election was also described as being was also described as serving as a proxy battle between Mayor Michelle Wu's allies and her critics: with Wu and several allies endorsing Cartwright, and several Wu critics endorsing Murphy.

== Personal life ==
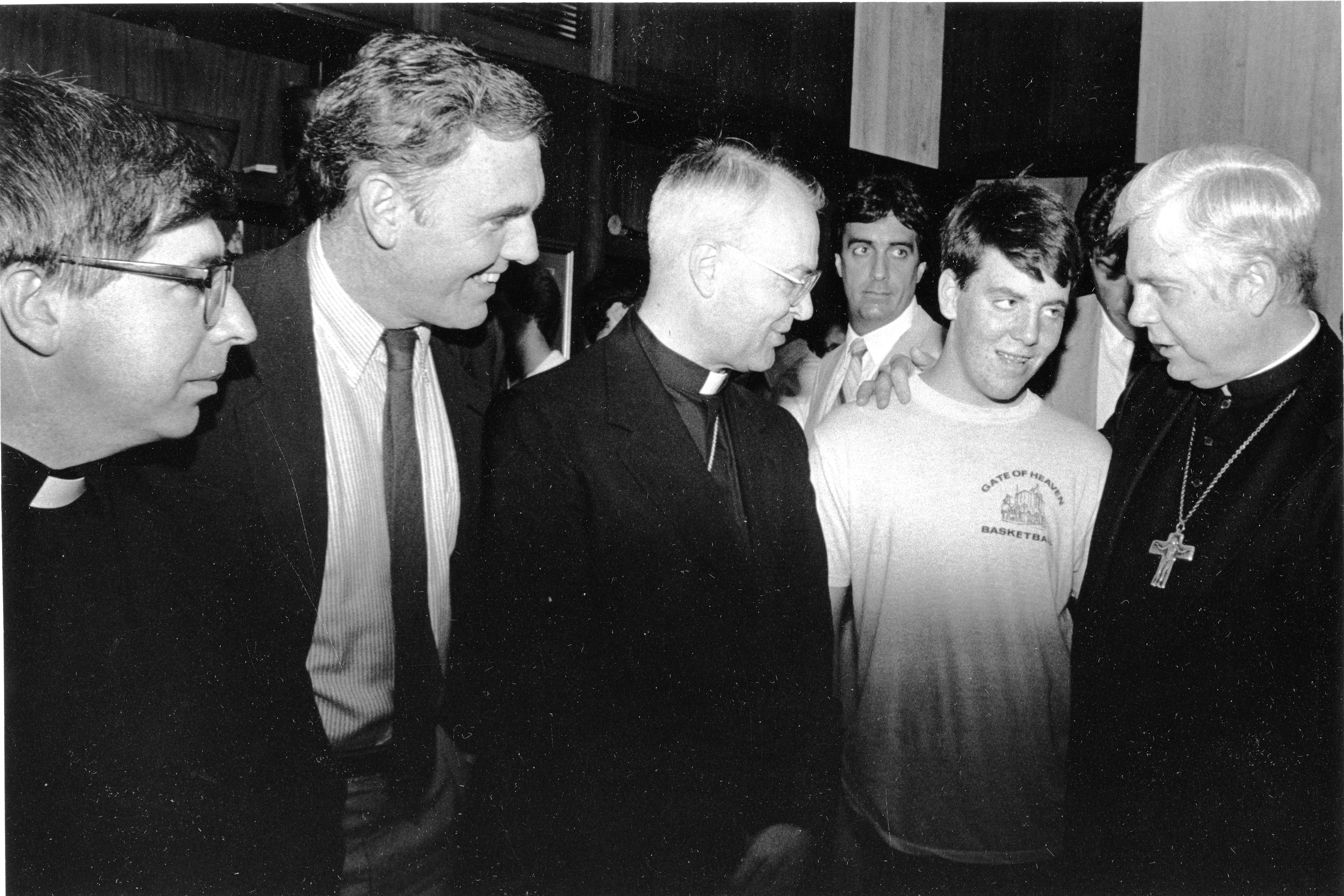
Flynn and his son Raymond Flynn Jr. with priests and Cardinal Bernard Francis Law (circa 1984–1987)

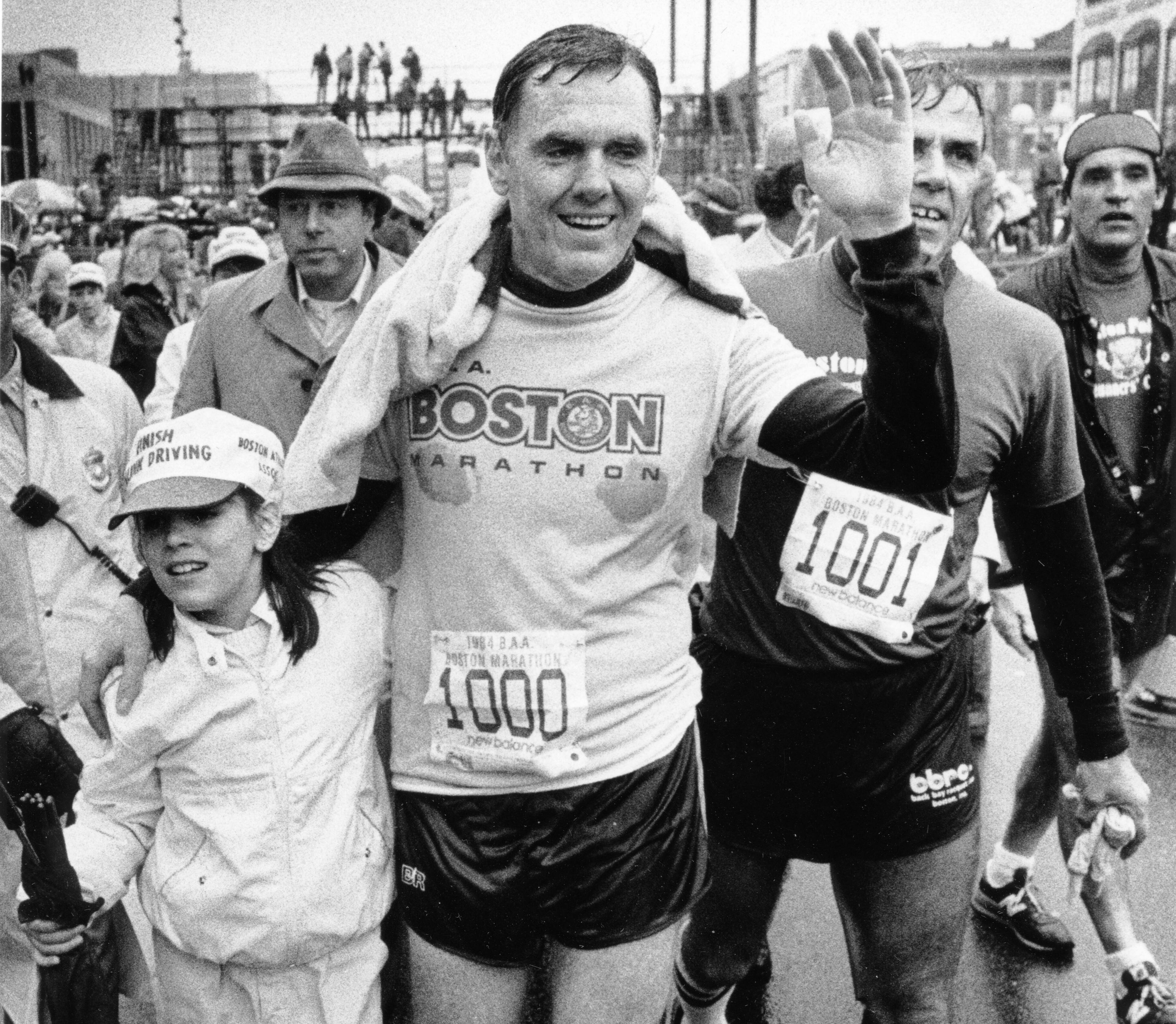
Flynn running in the 1984 Boston Marathon

Flynn is married to Catherine (née Coyne), who often goes by "Kathy". They have six children: Ray Jr., Edward, Julie, Nancy, Katie, and Maureen. In November 2017, son Edward M. Flynn was elected to the Boston City Council. Flynn has continued residing in South Boston.

While serving as mayor, Flynn played himself in the 1989 episode "The Stork Brings A Crane" of the Boston–set sitcom Cheers. In the episode, Flynn has his entourage take away Cliff Clavin, who writes to Flynn once a week.

Flynn was an avid runner who made headlines in 1984 when he ran in the Boston Marathon (with a finishing time of 4:23:54) and the New York City Marathon (finishing in 3:59:46).

In March 2007, Flynn was grand marshal of the 246th New York St. Patrick's Day Parade.

In May 2007, Flynn joined the College of Fellows of the Dominican School of Philosophy and Theology in Berkeley, California, who also awarded him the honorary degree Doctor of Humane Letters.

In September 2008, Flynn was hospitalized after he collapsed at a Boston-area speaking engagement. In March 2011, Flynn's home was broken into; among the valuables taken were rosary beads blessed by Pope John Paul II and letters from influential world figures. In April 2021, Flynn was hospitalized and received a hip replacement surgery after suffering a fall. In December of that year, Flynn was hospitalized after again falling, this time having broken a bone in his neck.

== Political views ==
During his political career, Flynn was regarded to be an "economic liberal" and "cultural conservative". Over the course of his political career, his positions on some matters remained consistent, while others evolved. Flynn has numerous times endorsed Republican candidates in closely contested elections, including George W. Bush in the 2000 president election, Scott Brown in 2010 and 2012 senate elections, and Mitt Romney in the 2012 presidential election.

In his early political career, Flynn prominently opposed court-ordered school desegregation busing. Over the course of his political career, Flynn consistently opposed abortion. Despite having opposed gun control policies in his early political career as mayor Flynn supported them. While he opposed gay rights issues in his early political career, by the time of his first mayoral campaign made an active effort to ingratiate himself to the gay community. However, motivated by his continued opposition to same-sex marriage, shortly after the Massachusetts Supreme Judicial Court ruled that in 2004 that same-sex marriage was a protected right in Massachusetts, Flynn attempted litigation to see their ruling overturned. Flynn opposed decreases initiated during the Reagan presidency to federal revenue sharing with cities. Elected mayor on a populist platform, Flynn supported wealth redistribution.

== Honors ==
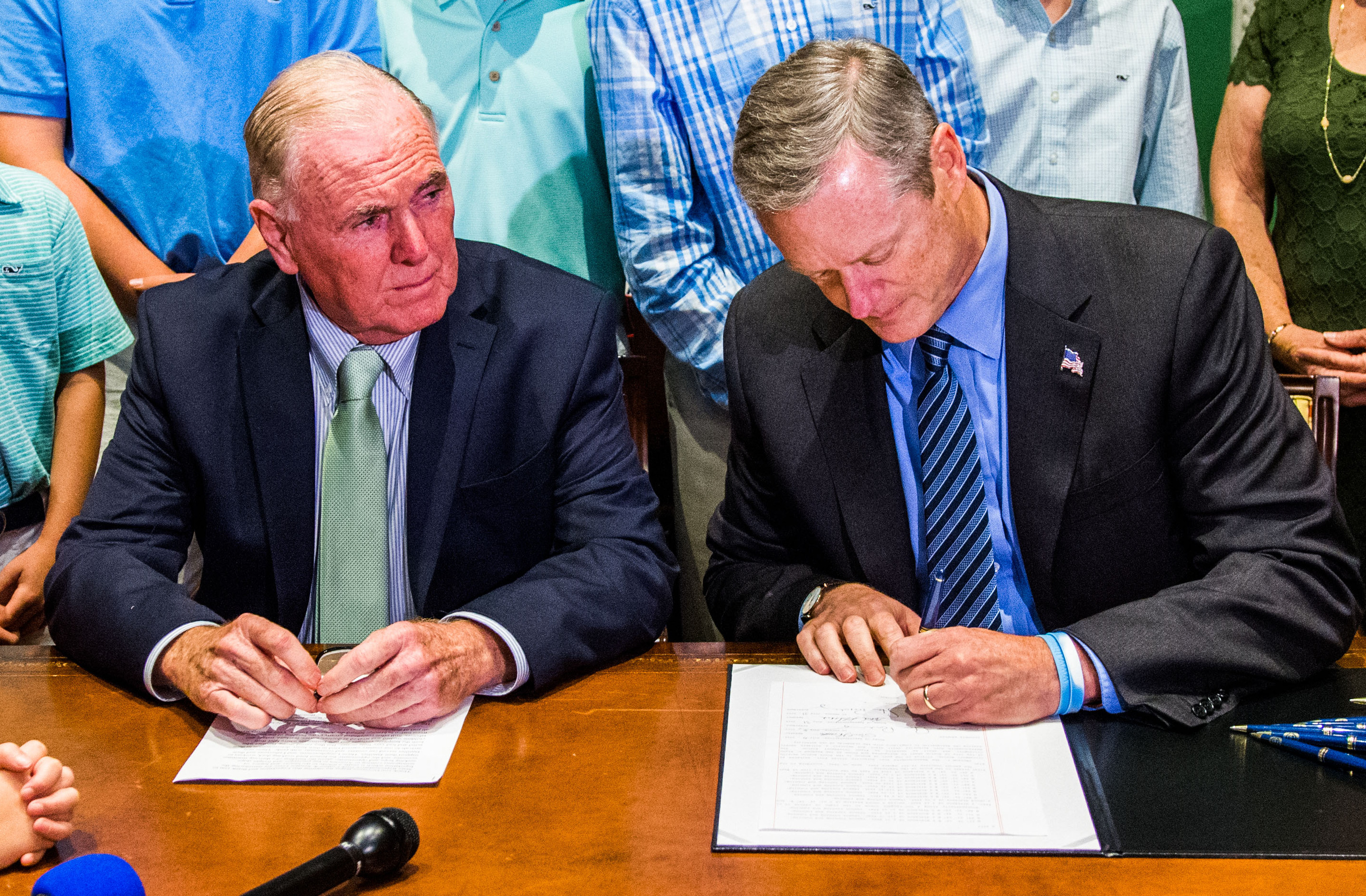
Flynn (left) sits alongside Governor Charlie Baker on February 11, 2016, as Baker signs into law legislation renaming to the Black Falcon Cruise Terminal the "Flynn Cruiseport Boston".

In February 2016, the Boston Marine Industrial Park was renamed the Raymond L. Flynn Marine Park. A nearby bridge was also renamed in Flynn's honor. In May 2017, Governor of Massachusetts Charlie Baker dedicated Flynn Cruiseport Boston, located in the Port of Boston.

Flynn has received a number of civic awards. He has received the B'nai B'rith International Humanitarian Award, Martin Luther King Jr. Award, and Boys Club of America "Man of the Year Award". In 2019, the business interest organization A Better City awarded Flynn a "Lifetime Achievement" award. Then-mayor Marty Walsh presented the award to Flynn at an awards ceremony. Walsh praised Flynn, declaring that Flynn had "led at the national and international level, while always staying closely connected to the people in our working class neighborhoods. He's always been a champion for everyday people: working men and women; kids and seniors; people with disabilities; and everyone who calls the city of Boston their home."

== Electoral history ==
=== State representative ===
1970

1970 Massachusetts House of Representatives 6th Suffolk district Democratic primary (2-member district)
Party	Candidate	Votes	%
Democratic	Michael F. Flaherty Sr.	5,083	26.4
Democratic	Raymond L. Flynn	2,041	19.6
Democratic	James F. Condon	3,104	16.1
Democratic	Joseph F. Toomey	1,878	9.8
Democratic	David J. Keefe	1,566	8.1
Democratic	William J. Grant	1,167	6.1
Democratic	John J. Driscoll Jr.	1,113	5.8
Democratic	Thomas J. Sullivan	691	3.6
Democratic	John J. O'Callaghan	333	1.7
Democratic	Donald W. Mello	228	1.5
Democratic	John V. Kazarian	259	1.3
Total votes		19,259	100

1970 Massachusetts House of Representatives 6th Suffolk district election (2-member district)
Party	Candidate	Votes	%
Democratic	Michael F. Flaherty Sr.	10,834	52.4
Democratic	Raymond L. Flynn	9,824	47.6
Total votes			100

1972

1972 Massachusetts House of Representatives 6th Suffolk district Democratic primary (2-member district)
Party	Candidate	Votes	%
Democratic	Raymond L. Flynn (incumbent)	4,710	33.4
Democratic	Michael F. Flaherty Sr. (incumbent)	4,418	31.3
Democratic	Robert M. O'Brein	3,310	23.5
Democratic	Paul T. O'Leary	635	4.5
Democratic	Ronald F. Bassil	576	4.1
Democratic	Ali J. Fiumedoro	175	1.2
Democratic	Pa J. L. Rosemond	144	1.0
Democratic	Geoffirey P. Morris	128	0.9
Total votes		14,096	100

1972 Massachusetts House of Representatives 6th Suffolk district election (2-member district)
Party	Candidate	Votes	%
Democratic	Michael F. Flaherty Sr. (incumbent)	10,660	48.3
Democratic	Raymond L. Flynn (incumbent)	10,113	45.8
Republican	Ernest A. Fragopulos	1,305	5.9
Total votes		22,078	100

1974

1974 Massachusetts House of Representatives 7th Suffolk district Democratic primary
Party	Candidate	Votes	%
Democratic	Raymond L. Flynn (redistricted incumbent)	3,526	100
Total votes		3,526	100

1972 Massachusetts House of Representatives 7th Suffolk district election
Party	Candidate	Votes	%
Democratic	Raymond L. Flynn (redistricted incumbent)	5,761	100
Total votes		5,761	100

1976

1976 Massachusetts House of Representatives 7th Suffolk district Democratic primary
Party	Candidate	Votes	%
Democratic	Raymond L. Flynn (incumbent)	3,988	75.9
Democratic	Gerard F. Burke	1,265	24.1
Total votes		5,253	100

1972 Massachusetts House of Representatives 7th Suffolk district election
Party	Candidate	Votes	%
Democratic	Raymond L. Flynn (incumbent)	6,817	100
Total votes		6,817	100

=== City council ===
1975 Boston City Council election
Candidates	Preliminary election		General election	
Candidates	Votes	%	Votes	%
Louise Day Hicks (incumbent)	46,030	8.86	82,050	8.97
Christopher A. Iannella (incumbent)	35,793	6.69	71,484	7.82
James Michael Connolly (incumbent)	25,536	4.92	71,157	7.78
Albert L. O'Neil (incumbent)	38,203	7.36	66,583	7.28
Lawrence S. DiCara (incumbent)	32,119	6.18	62,247	6.81
John J. Kerrigan	35,117	6.76	60,581	6.62
Frederick C. Langone (incumbent)	27,579	5.31	60,238	6.59
Patrick F. McDonough (incumbent)	22,464	4.32	57,968	6.34
Joseph M. Tierney (incumbent)	33,700	6.49	57,003	6.23
Raymond L. Flynn	27,754	5.34	55,536	6.07
Gerald F. O'Leary (incumbent)	33,653	6.48	55,390	6.06
Jack Cole	22,542	4.34	53,176	5.81
Clarence E. Dilday	14,774	2.84	34,531	3.78
Franx X. Curley	14,661	2.82	32,339	3.54
Thomas M. Connelly Jr.	14,345	2.76	28,433	3.11
Thomas A. McDonough	14,775	2.84	24,847	2.72
Edward Brooks	10,719	2.06	22,959	2.51
William T. Donovan	8,557	1.65	18,106	1.98
Joseph A. McCarthy	8,127	1.56		
Robert J. Feeney	8,047	1.55		
Salvatore LaRosa	7,365	1.42		
Reba Williams	5,356	1.03		
Albert DiNicola	5,135	0.99		
Ralph M. Cotellesso	5,121	0.99		
Arthur Michael Pascal	4,409	0.85		
Robert P. Kane	3,832	0.74		
Jacqueline Y. LeBeau	3,387	0.65		
Alfred Smith	3,320	0.64		
Sean M. Harvey	3,182	0.61		
Victor Naum Themo	2,084	0.40		
John Hillson	1,713	0.33		
All others	1	0.00	1	0.00

1977 Boston City Council election
Candidates	Preliminary election		General election	
Candidates	Votes	%	Votes	%
James Michael Connolly (incumbent)	22,212	5.92	37,479	7.97
Raymond Flynn	19,248	2.96	35,757	7.60
Christopher A. Iannella (incumbent)	21,577	6.64	35,682	7.59
Dapper O'Neil (incumbent)	20,875	6.42	35,543	7.56
Lawrence DiCara (incumbent)	19,048	5.86	32,232	6.85
Joseph M. Tierney (incumbent)	17,500	5.39	31,913	6.79
Rosemarie Sansone	12,954	3.99	30,531	6.49
Frederick C. Langone (incumbent)	15,156	4.66	30,268	6.44
Patrick F. McDonough (incumbent)	15,868	4.88	30,205	6.44
Louise Day Hicks (incumbent)	19,862	6.11	30,058	6.39
Gerald O'Leary	14,979	4.61	23,868	5.08
Gerard P. McHale	12,753	3.92	20,610	4.38
John J. Kerrigan (incumbent)	11,810	3.63	20,045	.4.26
Arnett L. Waters	10,589	3.26	18,109	3.85
Lawrence E. Blacke	9,801	3.02	16,899	3.59
Bruce Bolling	8,634	2.66	15,518	3.30
Stephen C. Farrell	8,505	2.62	13,980	2.97
Paul J. Ellison	7,919	2.22	11,542	2.45
William T. Donovan	7,198	2.22		
Elizabeth Buckley	6,886	2.12		
Robert Whitey McGrail	6,740	1.03		
Harold L. O’Brien	5,869	1.81		
James J. Tobin	4,907	1.51		
Polly Jane Halfkenny	4,380	1.35		
John T. Cuddy	4,288	1.32		
Celia M. Sniffin	3,965	1.22		
Diane Jacobs	3,827	1.18		
Norma Walsh Gramer	3,559	1.10		
Richard Hird	2,365	0.73		
George R. Geller	1,675	0.52		
scattering	1	0.00	4	0.00

1979 Boston City Council election
Candidates	Preliminary election		General election	
Candidates	Votes	%	Votes	%
Lawrence DiCara (incumbent)	42,339	6.50	69,102	8.15
Christopher A. Iannella (incumbent)	45,184	6.94	69,069	8.15
Raymond Flynn (incumbent)	45,648	7.01	66,662	7.86
Frederick C. Langone (incumbent)	48,063	7.38	64,873	'7.65
Dapper O'Neil (incumbent)	48,781	7.49	60,846	7.17
Joseph M. Tierney (incumbent)	43,759	6.72	58,674	6.92
John W. Sears	41,108	6.31	58,205	6.87
Rosemarie E. Sansone (incumbent)	46,391	7.12	57,552	6.79
Patrick F. McDonough (incumbent)	34,646	5.32	55,123	6.50
Louise Day Hicks (incumbent)	44,659	6.86	54,714	6.45
James T. Brett	34,941	5.37	51,767	6.11
Terence P. McDermott	30,124	4.63	39,882	4.70
Barbara A. Ware	19,519	2.30	33,951	4.01
Stephen C. Farrell	20,173	3.10	27,038	3.19
Charles Yancey	14,487	2.22	22,301	2.63
Edward Brooks	19,772	3.04	24,165	2.85
Richard M. Lane	17,424	2.68	17,771	2.10
David Joseph McKay	12,873	1.98	15,981	1.89
Jeannette L. Tracy	11,711	1.80		
Phyllis Igoe	9,205	1.41		
Stephen Michael Cidlevich	8,645	1.33		
Eugene A. Cavicchi	6,626	1.02		
Peter K. Hadley	5,187	0.80		

1981 Boston City Council election
Candidates	Preliminary election		General election	
Candidates	Votes	%	Votes	%
Raymond Flynn (incumbent)	31,898	7.77	53,136	9.54
Christopher A. Iannella (incumbent)	25,462	6.20	44,621	8.01
Dapper O'Neil (incumbent)	24,240	5.91	40,474	7.27
Frederick C. Langone (incumbent)	23,000	5.60	39,780	7.14
Joseph M. Tierney (incumbent)	17,649	4.30	35,185	6.32
Michael J. McCormack	14,178	3.45	33,861	6.08
Terence P. McDermott	11,981	2.92	31,707	5.69
Maura Hennigan	14,325	3.49	31,637	5.68
Bruce Bolling	15,273	3.72	30,672	5.51
James M. Kelly	14,941	3.64	30,079	5.40
Patrick F. McDonough (incumbent)	17,165	4.18	29,591	5.31
Edmund McNamara	12,007	2.93	29,301	5.26
David Scondras	11,616	2.83	28,571	5.13
Charles Yancey	12,378	3.02	27,007	4.85
Francis X. Coppinger	11,034	2.69	21,675	3.89
Craig Lankhorst	10,301	2.51	20,769	3.73
Pamela J. Gilman	10,070	2.45	14,776	2.65
Gerard P. McHale	10,407	2.54	14,173	2.54
Joseph W. Casper	9,906	2.41		
Frederick T. Scopa	9,444	2.30		
John F. Melia	8,788	2.14		
Stephen G. Michaels	8,325	2.03		
Brian Hickey	8,222	2.00		
John P. Grady	7,855	1.91		
Richard B. Hogan	7,794	1.90		
Edward M. McCormack	7,610	1.85		
William G. Broderick	7,134	1.74		
Joseph E. Maher	6,269	1.53		
Maureen Craven Slade	5,759	1.40		
Althea Garrison	5,442	1.33		
Joseph T. Fitzpatrick	3,947	0.96		
David F. Burnes	3,784	0.92		
David Alan Mittell Jr.	3,660	0.89		
Francis X. Goode	3,227	0.79		
Thomas P. Casserly	3,005	0.73		
Warren I. Brown	3,001	0.73		
John S. MacDonald	2,881	0.70		
Edward J. DeSantis	2,688	0.65		
John B’Smith III	1,936	0.47		
John K. Rees	1,791	0.44		

=== Mayoral ===
1983 Boston mayoral election
Candidates	Preliminary election		General election	
Candidates	Votes	%	Votes	%
Raymond Flynn	48,118	28.86	128,578	65.07
Mel King	47,848	28.70	69,015	34.93
David Finnegan	41,657	24.99		
Lawrence DiCara	15,148	9.09		
Dennis J. Kearney	10,992	6.59		
Frederick C. Langone	2,262	1.36		
Bob Kiley	316	0.19		
Michael Gelber	207	0.12		
Eloise Linger	168	0.10		

1987 Boston mayoral election
Candidates	Preliminary election		General election	
Candidates	Votes	%	Votes	%
Raymond Flynn (incumbent)	42,366	70.39	63,714	67.47
Joseph M. Tierney	16,257	27.01	30,714	32.52
Joel San Juan	1,083	1.08		
Richard A. Black	484	0.80		

1991 Boston mayoral election
Candidates	Preliminary election		General election	
Candidates	Votes	%	Votes	%
Raymond Flynn (incumbent)	43,123	67.29	63,582	74.58
Edward J. Doherty	12,281	19.16	21,659	25.41
Graylan Ellis-Hagler	8,682	13.55		

=== Congressional ===
1998 Massachusetts 8th Congressional District Democratic primary
Party	Candidate	Votes	%
Democratic	Michael E. Capuano	19,446	22.9
Democratic	Raymond L. Flynn	14,839	17.5
Democratic	George Bachrach	12,157	14.3
Democratic	John T. Connor	11,092	13.1
Democratic	Marjorie O'Neill Clapprood	10,446	12.3
Democratic	Christopher F. Gabrieli	5,740	6.8
Democratic	Charles Calvin Yancey	4,437	5.2
Democratic	Susan M. Tracy	2,858	3.4
Democratic	Thomas M. Keane, Jr.	2,150	2.5
Democratic	Alex Rodriguez	1,802	2.1
Write-in	All others	21	0.0
Total votes		84,988	100

== College basketball statistics ==
Legend
GP	Games played	GS	Games started	MPG	Minutes per game
FG%	Field goal percentage	3P%	3-point field goal percentage	FT%	Free throw percentage
RPG	Rebounds per game	APG	Assists per game	SPG	Steals per game
BPG	Blocks per game	PPG	Points per game	**Bold**	Career high

Year	Team	GP	MPG	FG%	FT%	RPG	APG	STL	BLK	PPG
1960–61	Providence	**28**		.401	.765	1.4		—	—	5.8
1961–62	Providence	26		.451	.755	**3.0**		—	—	12.8
1962–63	Providence	**28**		**.497**	**.797**	2.4		—	—	**18.9**
Career		82		.464	.777	2.3		—	—	12.5

== Bibliography ==
Flynn is the co-author of two books:

- Flynn, Ray; Moore, Robin (2000). The Accidental Pope: A Novel. St. Martin's Press. ISBN 0-312-26801-7.
- Flynn, Ray; Moore, Robin; Vrabel, James (2001). John Paul II: A Personal Portrait of the Pope and the Man. St. Martin's Griffin. ISBN 0-312-26681-2.

== See also ==
- 1971–1972 Massachusetts legislature
- 1973–1974 Massachusetts legislature
- 1974–1975 Massachusetts legislature
- 1975–1976 Massachusetts legislature
- 1977–1978 Massachusetts legislature
- Timeline of Boston, 1980s–1990s

== Notes ==
Political offices
Preceded by Kevin White	Mayor of Boston; 1984–1993	Succeeded by Thomas Menino
Diplomatic posts
Preceded by Thomas Patrick Melady	US Ambassador to the Holy See; 1993–1997	Succeeded by Corinne Claiborne Boggs
