= 1981 Boston City Council election =

- November 3, 1981

Boston City Council election was held on November 3, 1981, with preliminary elections on September 21, 1981. This election was the final one before the Council transitioned from having 9 members (all at-large) to having 13 members (9 district representatives and 4 at-large).

== Candidates ==
Six of the nine incumbents (Raymond Flynn, Christopher A. Iannella, Frederick C. Langone, Patrick F. McDonough, Dapper O'Neil, & Joseph M. Tierney) ran for reelection. Lawrence DiCara, Rosemarie Sansone, and John W. Sears chose not to run.

=== Elected ===
- Bruce Bolling, aide to Boston mayor Kevin White.
- Raymond Flynn, member of the Boston City Council since 1978. Member of the Massachusetts House of Representatives from 1971 to 1979.
- Maura Hennigan, registered dietician and former Boston Public Schools teacher. Daughter of James W. Hennigan Jr. and granddaughter of James W. Hennigan Sr.
- Christopher A. Iannella, member of the Boston City Council since 1970. Previously served on the council from 1958 to 1968.
- Frederick C. Langone, member of the Boston City Council since 1973, previously served from 1964 to 1971 and in 1961.
- Michael J. McCormack, Assistant Attorney General for the Commonwealth of Massachusetts.
- Terence P. McDermott, attorney
- Dapper O'Neil, member of the Boston City Council since 1971.
- Joseph M. Tierney, member of the Boston City Council since 1972.

=== Lost in general election ===
- Francis X. Coppinger, member of the Massachusetts House of Representatives from 1975 to 1977 and previously from 1969 to 1973.
- James M. Kelly, metal worker and anti-busing activist.
- Pamela J. Gilman, former project director of Boston's Economic Development Industrial Commission and special assistant for the Massachusetts Office of Federal and State Relations.
- Craig Lankhorst, former Boston Public School teacher.
- Patrick F. McDonough, member of the Boston City Council since 1972. Previously served on the council from 1956 to 1964 and 1966 to 1970.
- Gerard P. McHale, former Boston Police officer (1980 to 1981), administrative assistant to the Boston Office of Public Facilities (1976 to 1980), and assistant director for the Boston Office of Personnel (1974 to 1976).
- Edmund McNamara, Commissioner of the Boston Police Department from 1962 to 1972.
- David Scondras, community activist.
- Charles Yancey, director of administration for the Massachusetts Office of Communities and Development from 1978 to 1979.

=== Eliminated in preliminary election ===
- John B'Smith III, bar manager.
- William G. Broderick, real estate broker and retired state police detective
- Warren I. Brown, Boston public school teacher since 1955.
- David F. Burnes, functional hall manager and Democratic State Committee member.
- Joseph W. Casper, founder of a human rights organization, funeral home manager, and former director of marketing for the Massachusetts Bay Transportation Authority (1967 to 1977).
- Thomas P. Casserly, owner of a wholesale scrap metal and paper goods company.
- Edward J. DeSantis, district superintendent for the Metropolitan District Commission.
- Joseph T. Fitzpatrick, librarian in the Boston Public Library system.
- Althea Garrison, employee of the Massachusetts Department of Revenue.
- Francis X. Goode, Boston city assessor since 1972.
- John P. Grady, head basketball coach at Don Bosco Technical High School and Boston youth activities manager.
- Richard B. Hogan, city hall employee during the Kevin White administration.
- John F. Melia, member of the Massachusetts House of Representatives from 1965 to 1981.
- Stephen G. Michaels, attorney and insurance company owner.
- Brian Hickey, manager of the Charlestown "Little City Hall" from 1979 to 1981.
- Frederick T. Scopa, senior administrative assistant for Boston's Real Property Department. Former technical assistant and training coordinator for the Employment and Economic Policy Administration.
- John S. MacDonald, assistant director of the Massachusetts League of Community Health Centers since 1978.
- Joseph E. Maher, member of the Boston Fire Department since 1974.
- Edward M. McCormack, principal of the Holy Childhood School at Nazareth since 1968.
- David Alan Mittell Jr., Boston public school teacher and coach.
- John K. Rees, anti-nuclear activist.
- Maureen Craven Slade, registered nurse and anti-abortion activist.

== Results ==
The top 18 candidates in the preliminary election moved on to the November general election. The top nine candidates in the November election were seated on the city council.

Candidates	Preliminary election		General election	
Candidates	Votes	%	Votes	%
Raymond Flynn (incumbent)	31,898	7.77	53,136	9.54
Christopher A. Iannella (incumbent)	25,462	6.20	44,621	8.01
Dapper O'Neil (incumbent)	24,240	5.91	40,474	7.27
Frederick C. Langone (incumbent)	23,000	5.60	39,780	7.14
Joseph M. Tierney (incumbent)	17,649	4.30	35,185	6.32
Michael J. McCormack	14,178	3.45	33,861	6.08
Terence P. McDermott	11,981	2.92	31,707	5.69
Maura Hennigan	14,325	3.49	31,637	5.68
Bruce Bolling	15,273	3.72	30,672	5.51
James M. Kelly	14,941	3.64	30,079	5.40
Patrick F. McDonough (incumbent)	17,165	4.18	29,591	5.31
Edmund McNamara	12,007	2.93	29,301	5.26
David Scondras	11,616	2.83	28,571	5.13
Charles Yancey	12,378	3.02	27,007	4.85
Francis X. Coppinger	11,034	2.69	21,675	3.89
Craig Lankhorst	10,301	2.51	20,769	3.73
Pamela J. Gilman	10,070	2.45	14,776	2.65
Gerard P. McHale	10,407	2.54	14,173	2.54
Joseph W. Casper	9,906	2.41		
Frederick T. Scopa	9,444	2.30		
John F. Melia	8,788	2.14		
Stephen G. Michaels	8,325	2.03		
Brian Hickey	8,222	2.00		
John P. Grady	7,855	1.91		
Richard B. Hogan	7,794	1.90		
Edward M. McCormack	7,610	1.85		
William G. Broderick	7,134	1.74		
Joseph E. Maher	6,269	1.53		
Maureen Craven Slade	5,759	1.40		
Althea Garrison	5,442	1.33		
Joseph T. Fitzpatrick	3,947	0.96		
David F. Burnes	3,784	0.92		
David Alan Mittell Jr.	3,660	0.89		
Francis X. Goode	3,227	0.79		
Thomas P. Casserly	3,005	0.73		
Warren I. Brown	3,001	0.73		
John S. MacDonald	2,881	0.70		
Edward J. DeSantis	2,688	0.65		
John B’Smith III	1,936	0.47		
John K. Rees	1,791	0.44		
