= 1975 Boston City Council election =

197t Boston City Council election
- November 4, 1975

The Boston City Council election was held on November 4, 1975, with preliminary elections on September 22, 1975.

== Results ==
1975 Boston City Council election
Candidates	Preliminary election		General election	
Candidates	Votes	%	Votes	%
Louise Day Hicks (incumbent)	46,030	8.86	82,050	8.97
Christopher A. Iannella (incumbent)	35,793	6.69	71,484	7.82
James Michael Connolly (incumbent)	25,536	4.92	71,157	7.78
Albert L. O'Neil (incumbent)	38,203	7.36	66,583	7.28
Lawrence S. DiCara (incumbent)	32,119	6.18	62,247	6.81
John J. Kerrigan	35,117	6.76	60,581	6.62
Frederick C. Langone (incumbent)	27,579	5.31	60,238	6.59
Patrick F. McDonough (incumbent)	22,464	4.32	57,968	6.34
Joseph M. Tierney (incumbent)	33,700	6.49	57,003	6.23
Raymond L. Flynn	27,754	5.34	55,536	6.07
Gerald F. O'Leary (incumbent)	33,653	6.48	55,390	6.06
Jack Cole	22,542	4.34	53,176	5.81
Clarence E. Dilday	14,774	2.84	34,531	3.78
Franx X. Curley	14,661	2.82	32,339	3.54
Thomas M. Connelly Jr.	14,345	2.76	28,433	3.11
Thomas A. McDonough	14,775	2.84	24,847	2.72
Edward Brooks	10,719	2.06	22,959	2.51
William T. Donovan	8,557	1.65	18,106	1.98
Joseph A. McCarthy	8,127	1.56		
Robert J. Feeney	8,047	1.55		
Salvatore LaRosa	7,365	1.42		
Reba Williams	5,356	1.03		
Albert DiNicola	5,135	0.99		
Ralph M. Cotellesso	5,121	0.99		
Arthur Michael Pascal	4,409	0.85		
Robert P. Kane	3,832	0.74		
Jacqueline Y. LeBeau	3,387	0.65		
Alfred Smith	3,320	0.64		
Sean M. Harvey	3,182	0.61		
Victor Naum Themo	2,084	0.40		
John Hillson	1,713	0.33		
All others	1	0.00	1	0.00
