= 1987 Boston mayoral election =

Election in Massachusetts, United States

- November 3, 1987
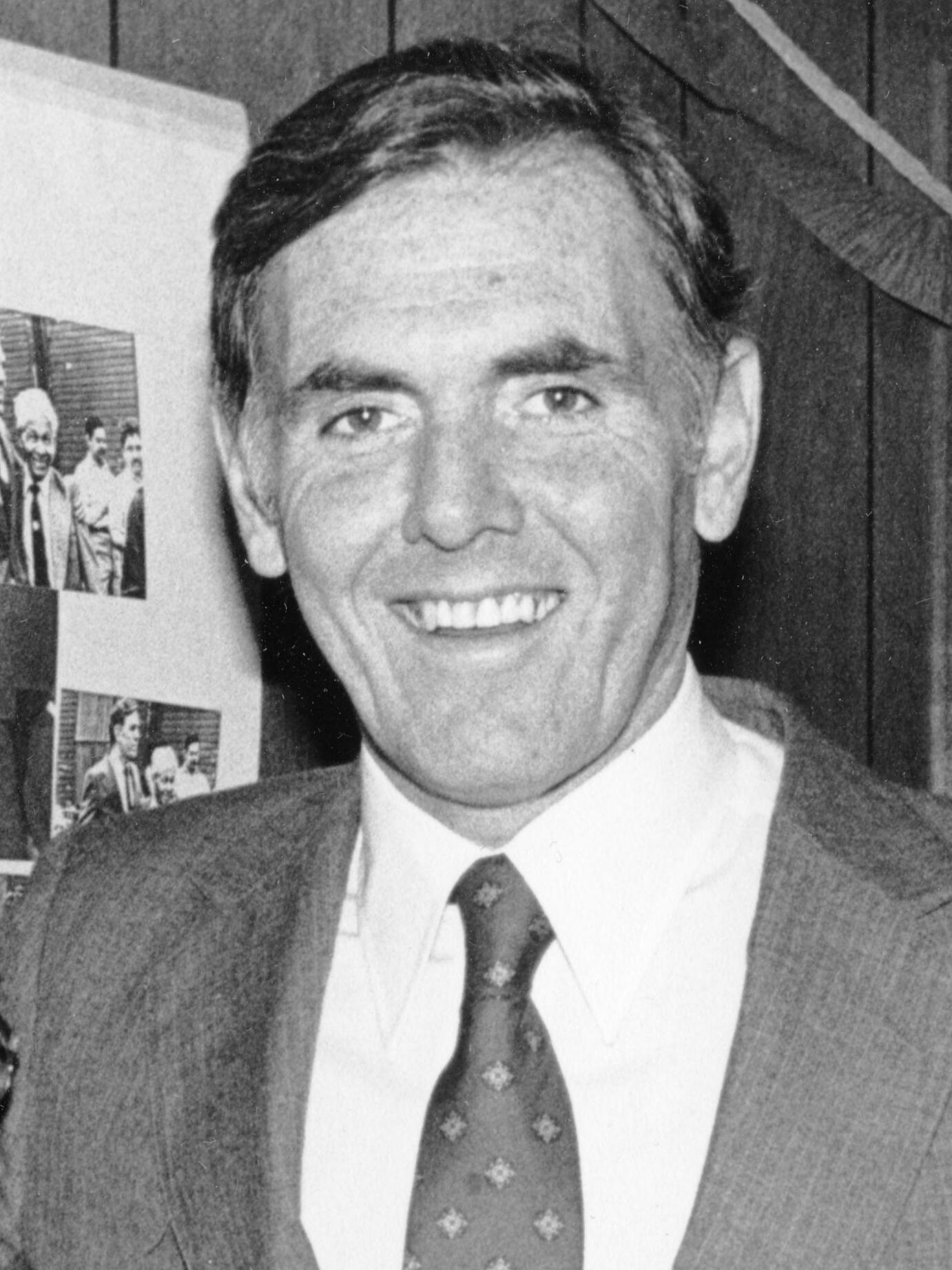

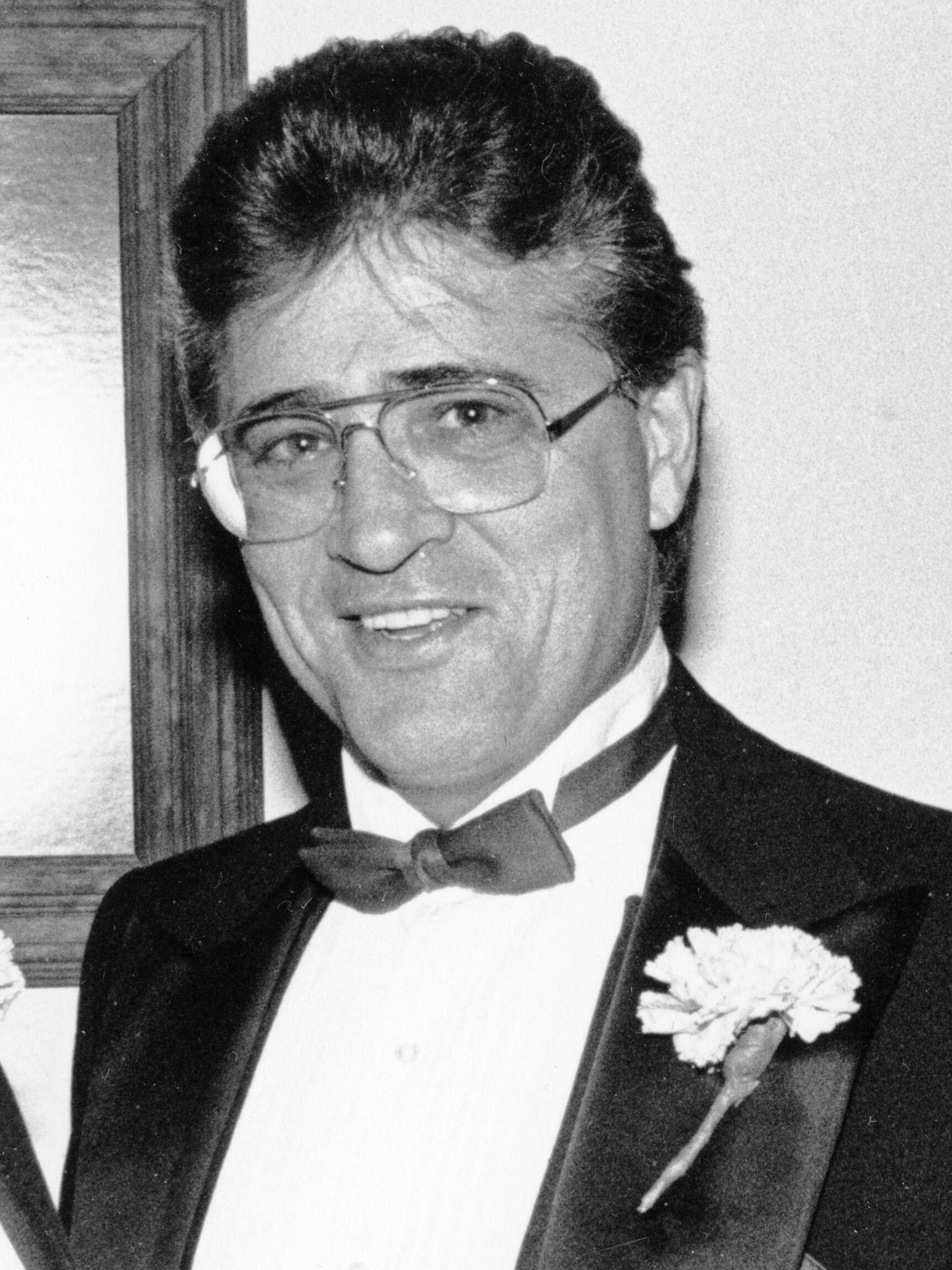
Candidate	Raymond Flynn	Joseph M. Tierney
Party	Nonpartisan	Nonpartisan
Popular vote	63,714	30,714
Percentage	67.47%	32.52%
- Results by ward Flynn: 50–60% 60–70% 70–80% 80–90% >90% Tierney: 50–60%
Mayor before election
Raymond Flynn
Elected mayor
Raymond Flynn

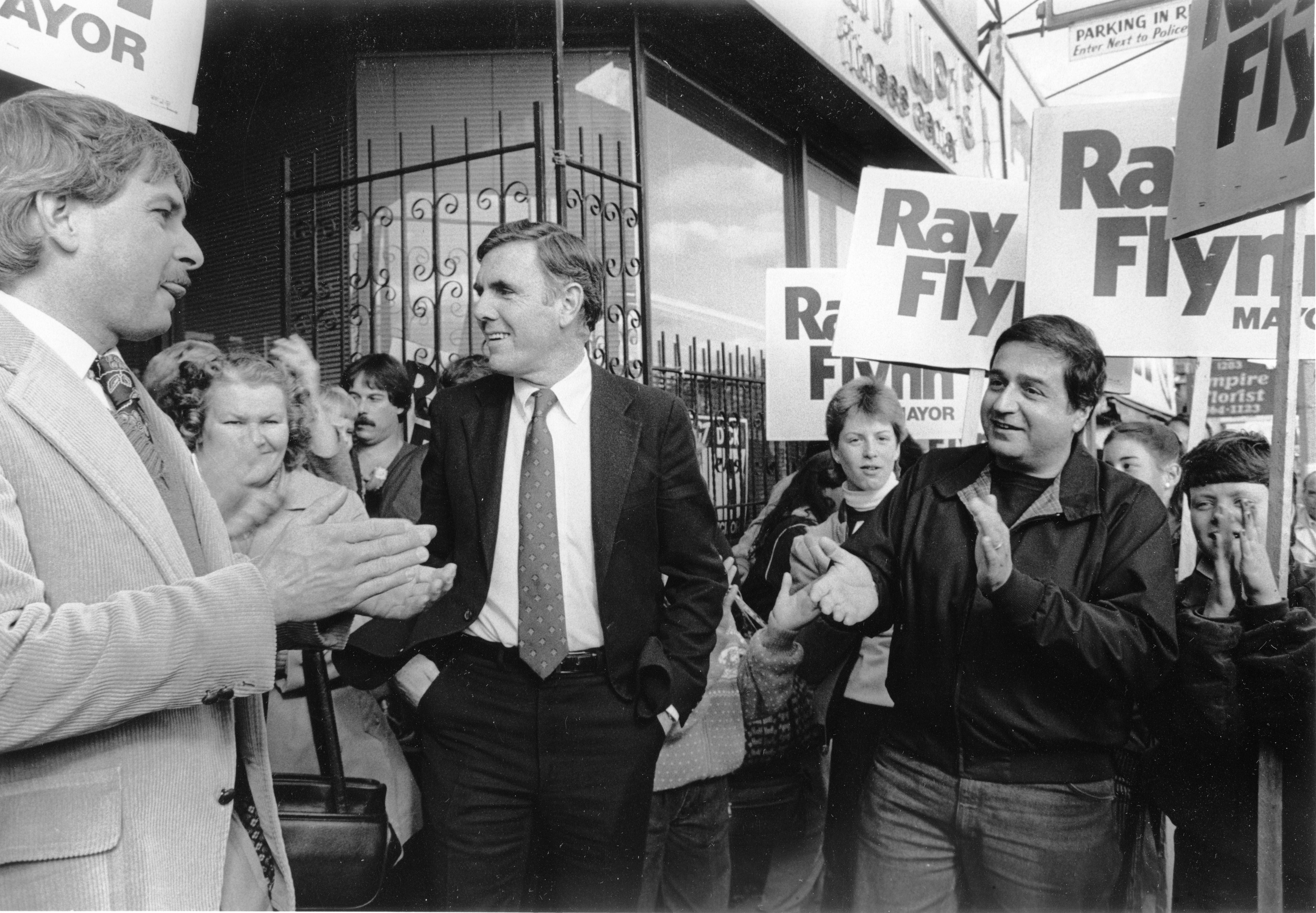
Flynn campaigning

The Boston mayoral election of 1987 occurred on Tuesday, November 3, 1987, between Mayor Raymond Flynn and City Council member Joseph M. Tierney. Flynn was re-elected to his second term.

The nonpartisan municipal preliminary election was held on September 22, 1987.

== Candidates ==
- Raymond Flynn, Mayor of Boston since 1983, member of the Boston City Council from 1978 to 1984, and state representative from 1971 to 1979.
- Joseph M. Tierney, Member of the Boston City Council since 1972, Council President in 1979 and from 1983 to 1985.

=== Candidates eliminated in preliminary ===
- Richard A. Black, member of the LaRouche movement.
- Joel San Juan, member of the Socialist Workers Party.

== Results ==
Candidates	Preliminary Election		General Election	
Candidates	Votes	%	Votes	%
Raymond Flynn (incumbent)	42,366	70.39	63,714	67.47
Joseph M. Tierney	16,257	27.01	30,714	32.52
Joel San Juan	1,083	1.08		
Richard A. Black	484	0.80		

== See also ==
- List of mayors of Boston, Massachusetts
