= Tom Gallagher (Massachusetts politician) =

American politician

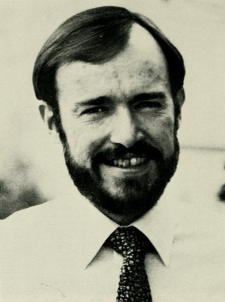

Member of the Massachusetts House of Representatives from the 1st Suffolk district
- In office 1980–1986
- Preceded by: John F. Melia
- Succeeded by: Kevin Honan

Personal details
- Born: The Bronx, New York City, U.S.
- Party: Democratic
- Other political affiliations: Democratic Socialists of America
- Education: Boston College (BA)

Tom Gallagher is an American politician, activist, author, and educator who served as a member of the Massachusetts House of Representatives for the 1st Suffolk district, which includes Allston–Brighton, from 1980 to 1986. After relocating to San Francisco, Gallagher had launched an unsuccessful campaign for California's 12th congressional district in 2020.

== Early life and education ==
Gallagher was born and raised in the South Bronx, New York City. He earned a scholarship to attend Regis High School in Manhattan, and later earned a Bachelor of Arts in Philosophy from Boston College.

== Career ==
Gallagher ran unsuccessfully for the Massachusetts House of Representatives in 1978, losing narrowly to a 14-year incumbent. Gallagher defeated the incumbent in a 1980 rematch election, and represented the Allston–Brighton neighborhood of Boston until 1986. A member of the Boston chapter of Democratic Socialists of America, Gallagher was the first declared socialist state legislator in Massachusetts since the 1920s.

After leaving office, Gallagher relocated to San Francisco and became involved in local progressive politics. Gallagher worked in the campaign for Proposition 186, which would have established a single-payer healthcare system in the state. He also worked on implementation of the Humphrey–Hawkins Full Employment Act. Gallagher also worked as a substitute teacher in San Francisco and South San Francisco, California. Gallagher was a candidate for California's 12th congressional district in 2020, campaigning as a progressive alternative to Nancy Pelosi. Gallagher has contributed articles to Common Dreams and has been profiled in Jacobin.

== See also ==
- List of Democratic Socialists of America who have held office in the United States
