= 1991 Boston mayoral election =

Election in Massachusetts, United States

- November 5, 1991
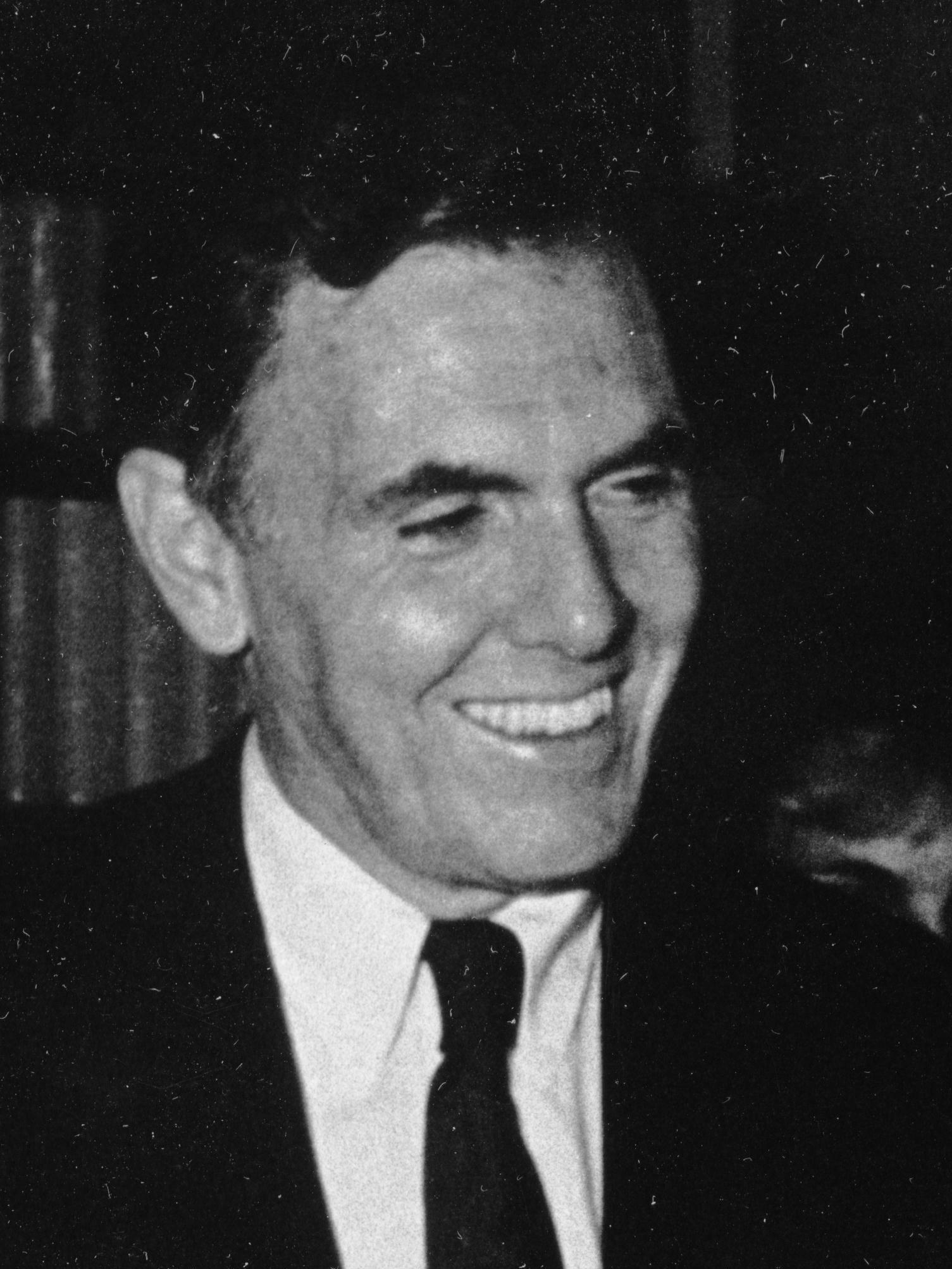

Candidate	Raymond Flynn	Edward J. Doherty
Party	Nonpartisan	Nonpartisan
Popular vote	63,582	21,659
Percentage	74.58%	25.41%
- Results by ward Flynn: 60–70% 70–80% 80–90%
Mayor before election
Raymond Flynn
Elected mayor
Raymond Flynn

The Boston mayoral election of 1991 occurred on Tuesday, November 5, 1991, between Mayor Raymond Flynn and Edward J. Doherty, president of the Boston Teachers Union. Flynn was re-elected to his third term.

The nonpartisan municipal preliminary election was held on September 24, 1991.

== Candidates ==
- Edward J. Doherty, president of the Boston Teachers Union
- Raymond Flynn, Mayor of Boston since 1983, member of the Boston City Council from 1978 to 1984, and state representative from 1971 to 1979.

=== Candidates eliminated in preliminary ===
- Graylan Ellis-Hagler, community activist and pastor.

== Results ==
Candidates	Preliminary election		General election	
Candidates	Votes	%	Votes	%
Raymond Flynn (incumbent)	43,123	67.29	63,582	74.58
Edward J. Doherty	12,281	19.16	21,659	25.41
Graylan Ellis-Hagler	8,682	13.55		

== See also ==
- List of mayors of Boston, Massachusetts
