= John F. Melia =

American politician

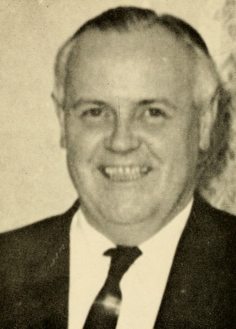

Member of the Massachusetts House of Representatives
- In office 1965–1981
- Succeeded by: Tom Gallagher

Personal details
- Born: June 5, 1915 Brighton, Boston
- Died: June 24, 1994 (aged 79) Plymouth, Massachusetts
- Party: Democratic
- Occupation: Caterer; Food consultant

John F. Melia (June 5, 1915 – June 24, 1994) was an American politician who was a member of the Massachusetts House of Representatives from 1965 to 1981.

Melia was born on June 5, 1915, in Boston. He attended Brighton High School and Boston Commerce Graduate School. Prior to entering politics, Melia worked as a caterer and food consultant. From 1965 to 1981, Melia represented Brighton in the Massachusetts House of Representatives. He was defeated in the 1980 Democratic primary in Thomas M. Gallagher. He was an unsuccessful candidate for the Boston City Council in 1981 and 1983.

Melia died on June 24, 1994, at Pilgrim Manor Nursing Home in Plymouth, Massachusetts after a long illness.
