= Edmund McNamara =

Boston police commissioner

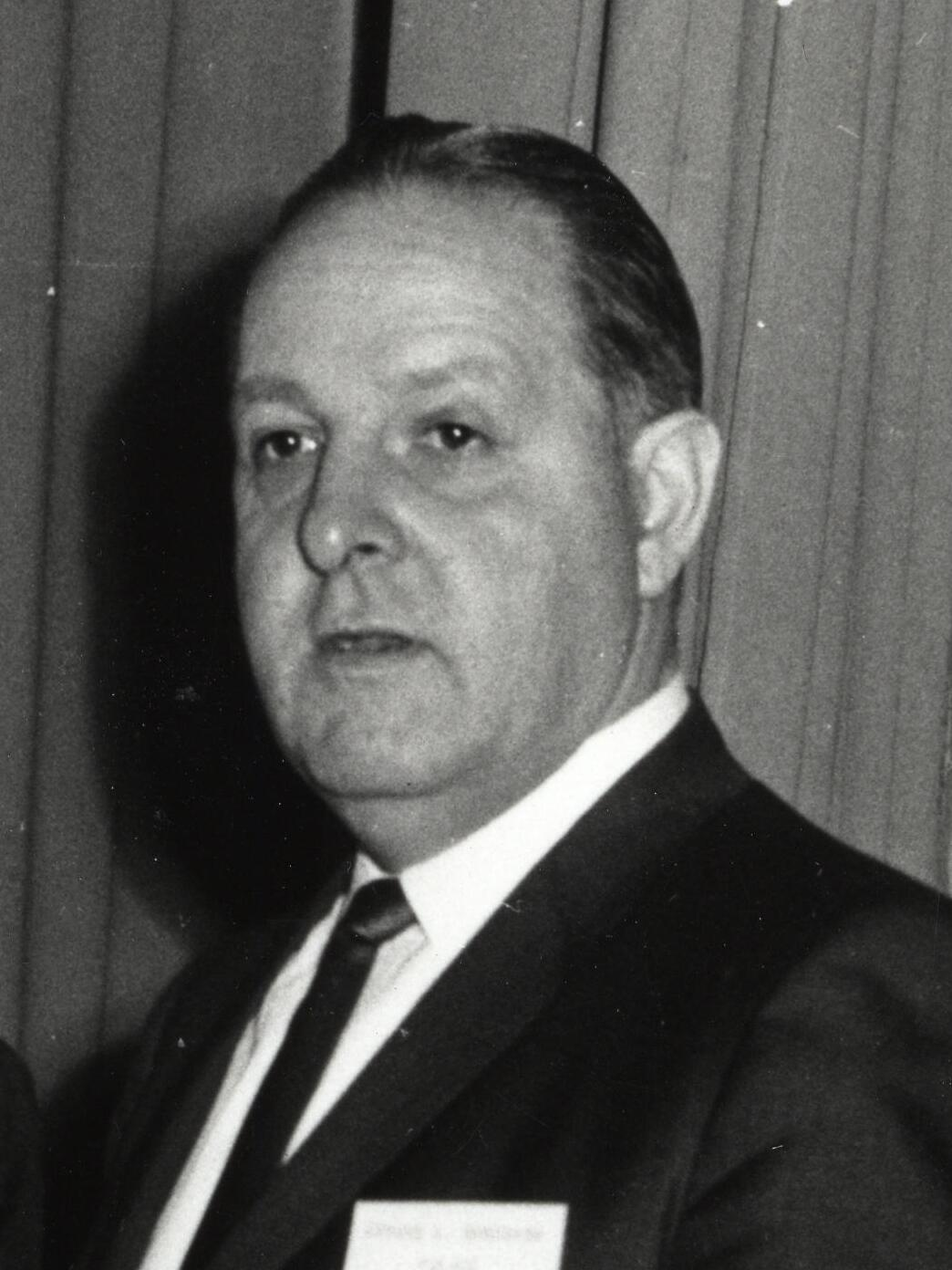
- McNamara in 1965
- Born: April 13, 1920; Boston, Massachusetts, U.S.
- Died: February 20, 2000 (aged 79); Boston, Massachusetts, U.S.
- Education: College of the Holy Cross (BA)
- Police career
- Department: Federal Bureau of Investigation; Boston Police Department
- Service years: 1945–1972
- Rank: Commissioner
- Football career

Profile
- Position: Tackle

Personal information
- Listed height: 6 ft 2 in (1.88 m)
- Listed weight: 225 lb (102 kg)

Career information
- High school: Clinton High School
- College: Holy Cross
- NFL draft: 1943: 27th round, 256th overall pick

Career history
- New York Giants (1945)*; Pittsburgh Steelers (1945)
- * Offseason or practice squad member only
- Stats at Pro Football Reference

Edmund Leo McNamara (April 13, 1920 – February 20, 2000) was an American law enforcement official and professional football player who served as commissioner of the Boston Police Department.

== Early life ==
McNamara was born on April 13, 1920, in Boston. He grew up in Clinton, Massachusetts, and attended Clinton High School. He played tackle on Clinton's undefeated 1938 football team.

== Football career and military service ==
McNamara attended the College of the Holy Cross on an athletic scholarship. He was selected by the New York Giants in the 27th round of the 1943 NFL draft. That same year he graduated from Holy Cross with a bachelor's degree in education. During World War II, McNamara served in the United States Navy as a Lt. Jg. and was skipper of the PT 127, where he earned a Silver Star for courageous action while under fire. After the war, McNamara returned to football. On October 9, 1945, Giants head coach Steve Owen announced that he had sold McNamara's contract to the Pittsburgh Steelers. Owen admired McNamara's military service and wanted him to play where he would have a better chance at a steady job.

== FBI ==
In 1945, McNamara joined the Federal Bureau of Investigation. He worked in the Bureau's Cincinnati and Washington, D.C., offices before returning to Boston in 1948. In 1950, he became the FBI's liaison to the Boston Police Department. He was a principal investigator in the Brinks robbery.

== Boston Police Department ==
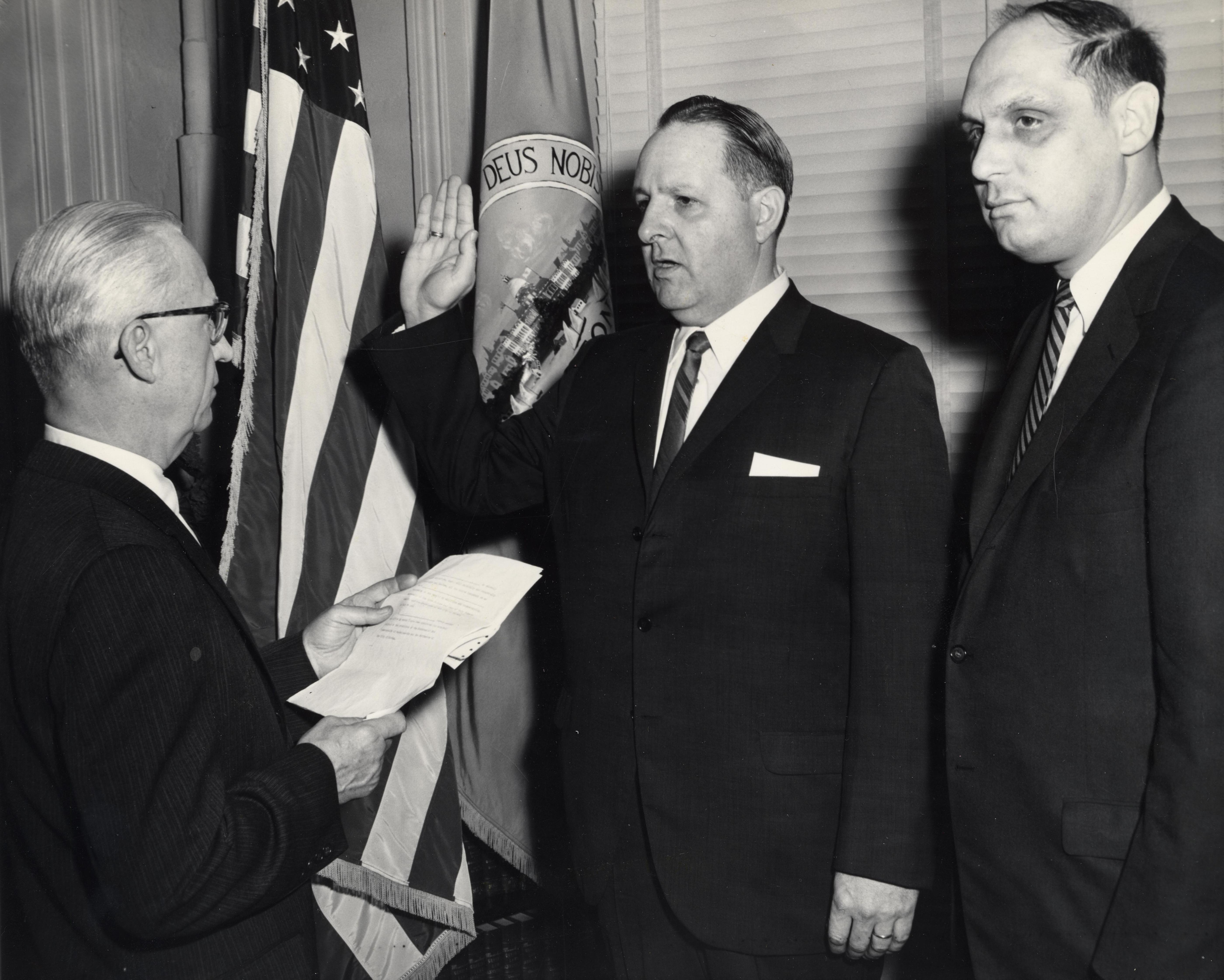
McNamara is sworn-in as police commissioner by city clerk Walter J. Malloy as deputy mayor Henry Scagnoli looks on

Boston police commissioner Leo J. Sullivan resigned on March 15, 1962, after a bookmaking scandal revealed by the CBS Reports documentary Biography of a Bookie Joint rocked the department. The scandal also caused the Massachusetts General Court and Governor John A. Volpe to transfer control of the department from the Governor of Massachusetts to the Mayor of Boston On April 5, 1962, Volpe officially ceded control and Mayor John F. Collins sent a cable from Italy, where he was vacationing, to confirm McNamara's appointment as commissioner. McNamara submitted his resignation to Boston's special agent in charge Leo L. Laughlin that day and assumed control of the department on a temporary basis. On May 1, he received a full five-year appointment to the position. McNamara was the first career law enforcement officer to serve as Boston police commissioner in the twentieth century.

During McNamara's first year in office, the city had to contend with the Boston Strangler murders, racial tensions and charges of police brutality after the police killing of singer Frank Lynch and subsequent cover-up, and an uproar in the predominantly African-American Roxbury neighborhood over inadequate police protection. During his first term, McNamara implemented a number of changes, including changes proposed by the Quinn Tamm report. These changes included the consolidation of police stations, modernization of the personnel record system, creation of a community relations program, and the formation of tactical patrol force to police high crime areas. His critics, however, believed that the department was undermanned and opposed his consolidation of neighborhood police stations.

During a 1963 investigation by the Boston City Council into the city's towing contracts, it was revealed that McNamara had listed his voting address as an apartment that was rented to Nathan Baker, a bail bondsman who formed a garage after McNamara took office which received most of the police department's towing business. After this came to light, McNamara ordered that all police towing cease. The Council did not find McNamara guilty of any wrongdoing.

In 1967, Collins reappointed McNamara to another five-year term. After Kevin White succeeded Collins as Mayor in 1968, he wanted to replace McNamara as commissioner. However, McNamara refused to resign and remained in office until his term expired on May 31, 1972.

== Later life and death ==
After leaving the BPD, McNamara served as president of Ogden Security, a Boston-based corporation that provided residential and business security. He left Ogden in 1981 and started his own management and security consultant firm. In 1981 and 1983 he was an unsuccessful candidate for the Boston City Council.

McNamara died on February 20, 2000, in Boston.

Police appointments
Preceded by Leo J. Sullivan	Commissioner of the Boston Police Department; April 6, 1962–May 31, 1972	Succeeded by Robert diGrazia
