= Joseph M. Tierney =

American politician (1941–2009)

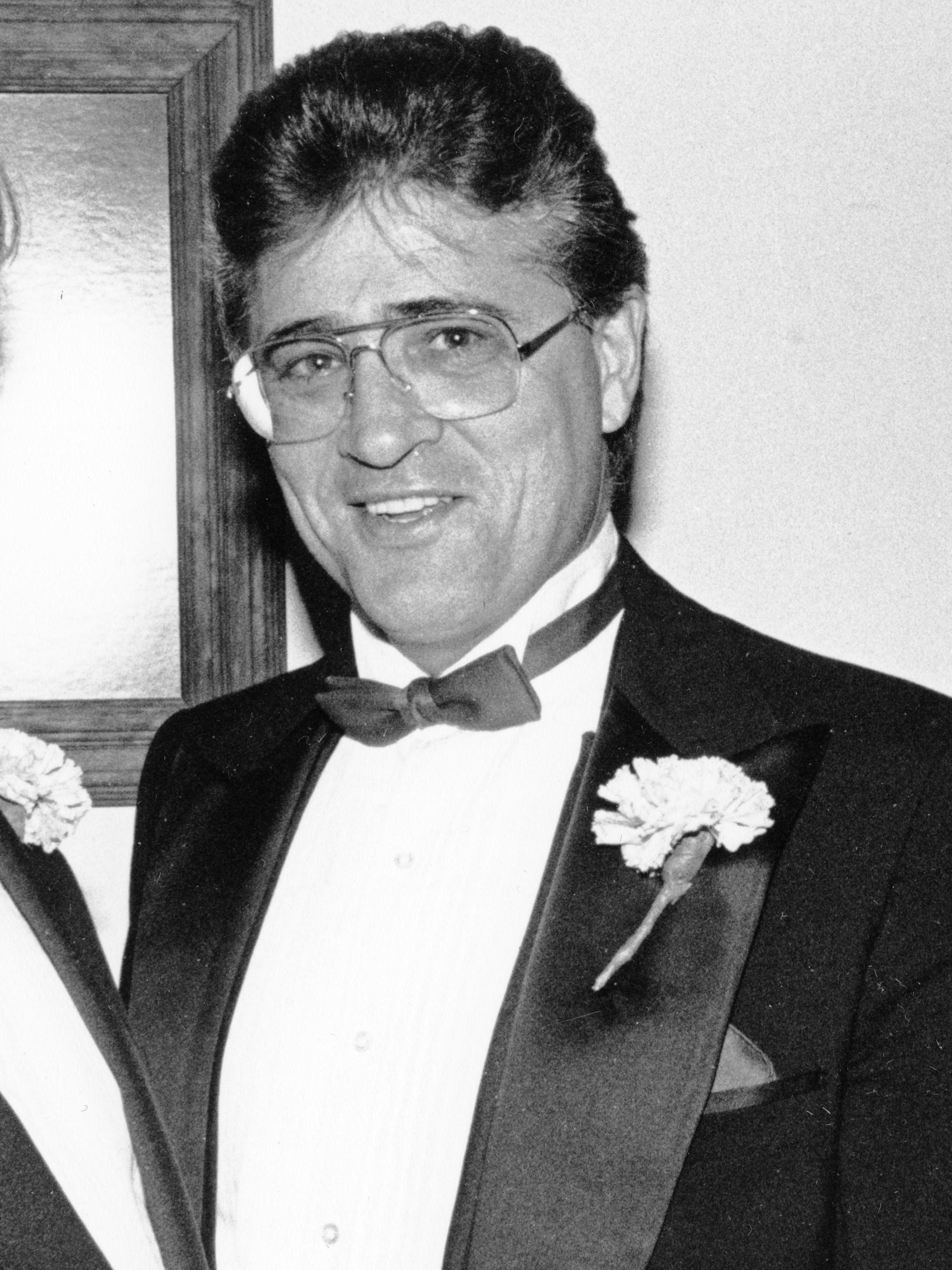
- Tierney (ca.1984–1987)

President of the Boston City Council
- In office 1983–1985
- Preceded by: Christopher A. Iannella
- Succeeded by: Bruce Bolling
- In office 1979
- Preceded by: Lawrence DiCara
- Succeeded by: Christopher A. Iannella
- In office 1977
- Preceded by: Louise Day Hicks
- Succeeded by: Lawrence DiCara
- In office 1964–1965
- Preceded by: Peter F. Hines
- Succeeded by: Frederick C. Langone

At-large member of the Boston City Council
- In office 1972–1987
- Succeeded by: Rosaria Salerno

Personal details
- Born: Joseph M. Tierney; January 1, 1941
- Died: December 13, 2009 (aged 68) Hyde Park, Boston, Massachusetts, U.S.
- Resting place: Cedar Grove Cemetery, Dorchester, Boston, Massachusetts, U.S.
- Party: Democratic
- Spouse: Pat James
- Children: 3, including Maura Tierney
- Education: Boston State College; Suffolk University Law School

Joseph M. Tierney (January 1, 1941 – December 13, 2009) was an American politician who served as a member of the Boston City Council from 1972 to 1987. He was the President of the City Council in 1977, 1979, and from 1983 to 1985. He was a candidate for Mayor of Boston in 1987, losing to incumbent Raymond Flynn, 67% to 33%. He was the father of actress Maura Tierney.

| Preceded by Louise Day Hicks; Lawrence DiCara; Christopher A. Iannella | President of the Boston City Council; 1977; 1979; 1983–1985 | Succeeded by Lawrence DiCara; Christopher A. Iannella; Bruce Bolling |
