= Lawrence DiCara =

American lawyer

Lawrence S. DiCara

President of the Boston City Council
- In office 1978
- Preceded by: Joseph M. Tierney
- Succeeded by: Joseph M. Tierney

Member of the Boston City Council
- In office 1972–1981

Personal details
- Born: 1949 (age 76–77) Dorchester, Massachusetts
- Education: Harvard College (AB); Suffolk University Law School (JD); John F. Kennedy School of Government (MPA)
- Occupation: politician, lawyer, author
- Known for: Boston politician, author

Lawrence "Larry" S. DiCara (born in Dorchester, Boston) is an American attorney, author and politician.

== Early life and education ==
DiCara was born in Dorchester, a neighborhood of Boston, Massachusetts, and is a graduate of the Boston Latin School. He holds degrees from University of Massachusetts, LL.D., (Hon.); Harvard University, John F. Kennedy School of Government, M.P.A.; Suffolk University Law School, J.D.; and Harvard College, A.B., cum laude. In 1966, DiCara attended Massachusetts Boys State and was elected to represent Massachusetts at American Legion Boys Nation.

== Career ==
From 1972 to 1981, DiCara was a member of the Boston City Council. In 1978, he was the Council President. When he took office at the age of 22, he became the youngest person to ever serve on the Boston City Council.

DiCara was a candidate for Treasurer and Receiver-General of Massachusetts in 1978. He finished second in the Democratic Primary behind incumbent Robert Q. Crane.

In 1983, he was a candidate for Mayor of Boston. He finished in fourth place with 9.09% of the vote.

In 1992, DiCara was an unsuccessful candidate for Chairman of the Massachusetts Democratic Party.

In addition to practicing law, DiCara has also taught at Harvard University, Boston University, and the University of Massachusetts Amherst. He has served as president or chairman of a number of charitable and civic organizations and has received numerous awards and recognitions.

He resides in Boston, MA.

== Selected publications and works ==
- DiCara (with Chris Black) Turmoil and Transition in Boston: A Political Memoir from the Busing Era published August 15, 2013 by Hamilton Books. ISBN 0-761-86182-3. Chris Black is listed as contributor. The author describes how he was affected personally and politically by the 1970s federally mandated policy that required Boston public school students to be reassigned to schools around the city in order to achieve racial integration.
- DiCara (with James D Sutherland) has contributed several columns to Commonwealth Magazine analyzing the Boston mayoral election, 2013 and electoral shifts occurring in the city.
- DiCara (with Charles P. Kindregan) Public education in Greater Boston : does America’s commitment to equality and integration stop at the city line?, Boston : Legal-Medical Studies, inc., 1977

Preceded by Joseph M. Tierney	President of the Boston City Council; 1978	Succeeded by Joseph M. Tierney
