= Juneteenth flag =

Flag that marks the holiday of Juneteenth

- Use: Commemorating the Juneteenth holiday
- Proportion: 2:3
- Adopted: Designed 1997; Revised 2000; Adopted 2000; Date added 2007
- Design: Upper half is blue and lower half is red. Colors are divided by a horizontal arch. In the center is a white star which is outlined.
- Designed by: Original designer Ben Haith; Revised by Lisa Jeanne Graf

The Juneteenth flag is a symbol for the Juneteenth holiday in the United States. The first version was created in 1997 by activist Ben Haith and that early version was displayed in 1997. The present version was first flown in 2000. The colors and symbols on the flag are representative of freedom and the end of slavery. The date on the flag represents that of General Order No. 3 issued in Galveston, Texas on June 19, 1865. Beginning in 2020, many states began recognizing Juneteenth by flying the flag over their state capitol buildings, especially after Juneteenth was declared a federal holiday by President Joe Biden the following year.

== Design ==
The Juneteenth flag was designed in 1997 by activist Ben Haith (also known as "Boston Ben"). Haith displayed the first version of the Juneteenth flag in June 1997 at Boston's John Eliot Square District. It was described by Patricia Smith of the Boston Globe as, "A banner adorned with sunbursts and flaming candles". A revised design was copyrighted by Haith in 2000. Haith also founded the National Juneteenth Celebration Foundation (NJCF). Lisa Jeanne Graf reports that as an illustrator she fine-tuned the design for the NJCF.

The flag uses the colors red, white and blue of the American flag. Featured prominently in the center of the flag is a bursting star. Running through the center of the flag horizontally, is an arc that is meant to symbolize the new horizon of opportunity for black people. According to the president of the National Juneteenth Observance Foundation Steve Williams, the star is a "Bursting star of freedom." Williams also states that the arch representing the horizon shows blue above and the red color below is symbolic of the ground soaked with blood; the blood which was shed of the Black Americans enslaved by the United States. The red, white, and blue colors were meant to convey the message that all enslaved people in the United States -- as well as their descendants -- are American. In 2007, the date "June 19, 1865" was added.

=== Symbolism ===
The five-pointed star refers both to Texas (nicknamed the "Lone Star state") and to the "freedom of African Americans in all 50 states". Surrounding it is a 12-ray nova (or "new star") representing a new beginning for all.

Lincoln's Emancipation Proclamation of January 1, 1863, declared that all slaves in the rebel Confederate States were free. The State of Texas rejoined the Union with the end of the Civil War on April 9, 1865. On June 19, 1865, Union General Gordon Granger arrived at the port of Galveston, Texas and announced that slavery had been ended with General Order No. 3. The Juneteenth Flag has the date of June 19, 1865 displayed on it.

One year later freed slaves in Texas celebrated the first Juneteenth on June 19, and it was called "Jubilee Day".

=== Variation ===
In May 2025 the Salt Lake City, Utah city council approved mayor Erin Mendenhall's designs for three new city flags, one being the Sego Celebration Flag, based on the Juneteenth flag. It is identical to the Juneteenth flag, except for the addition of a sego lily in the canton. The Sego Celebration Flag was adopted in response to a new state law restricting the flying of the Juneteenth flag and some other flags.

== History ==
The flag was first flown in 2000, at Boston's Roxbury Heritage State Park. Ben Haith initiated the Boston flag raising. Beginning in 2020 in the United States, several state governors ordered the Juneteenth flag to be raised over their capitol buildings on June 19. In 2020, Wisconsin Governor Tony Evers ordered the flag to be flown for the month of June. When the flag was raised in Wisconsin, state senator Lena Taylor of Milwaukee and the Wisconsin Legislative Black Caucus celebrated by raising their fists. Also in 2020 the flag was raised over the Cincinnati City Hall. In Illinois, Governor JB Pritzker ordered the flag to be flown above the Illinois State Capitol on June 19, 2021. In 2021 President Joe Biden signed a law marking Juneteenth as a federal holiday.

In 2020 the Boston Red Sox raised the Juneteenth flag over Fenway Park. The University of Nebraska celebrated Juneteenth by flying the flag alongside their Nebraska flag in 2020. The Juneteenth Flag was displayed at Fenway Park on June 19, 2022 along with the Flag of the United States of America.

== See also ==
- Black nationalism
- Ethnic flag
- Pan-African flag
