= Juneteenth =

U.S. holiday, June 19

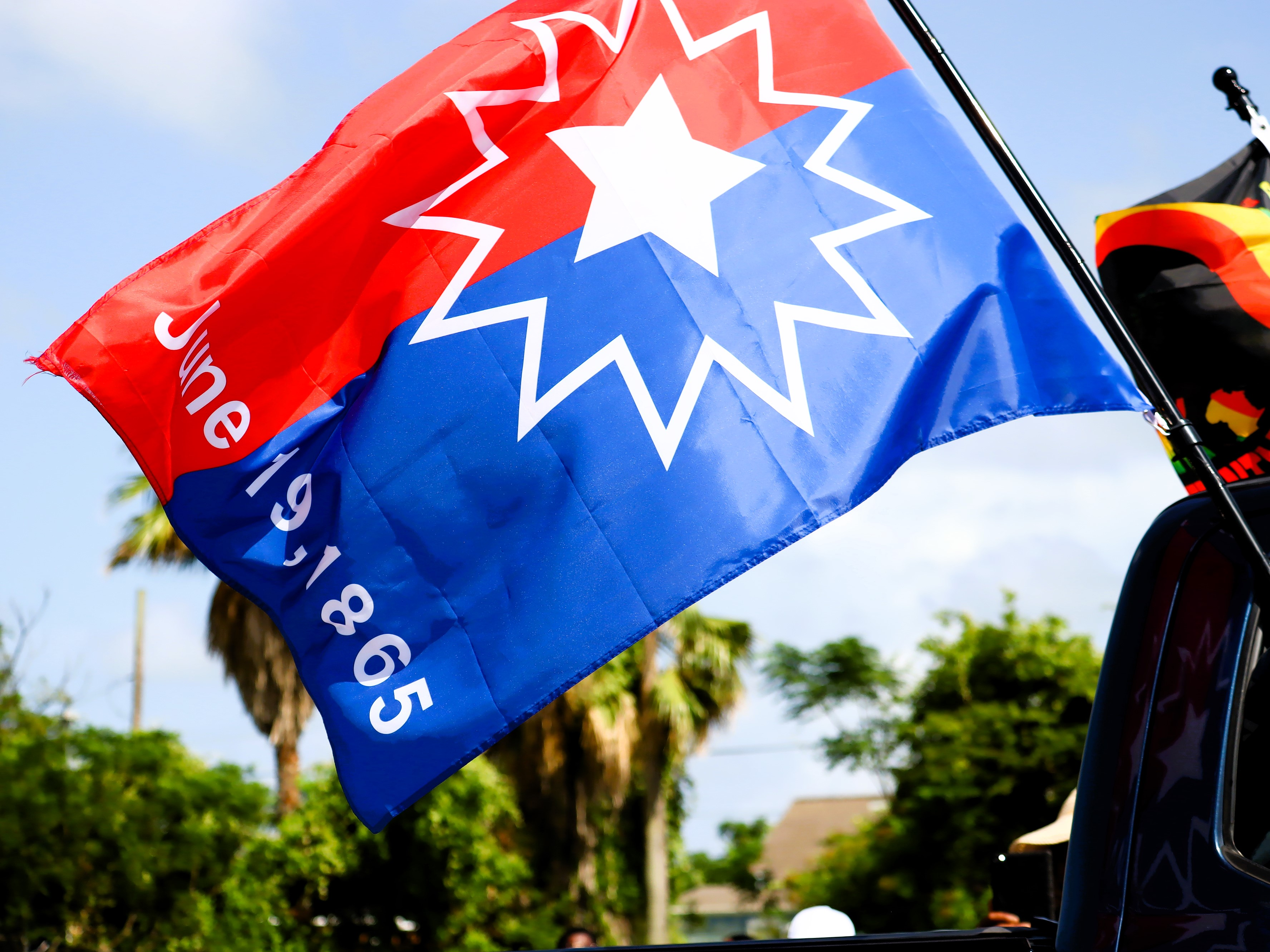
- A Juneteenth flag from a parade in Galveston, Texas
- Official name: Juneteenth National Independence Day
- Also called: Jubilee Day; Emancipation Day (Texas); Freedom Day; Black Independence Day
- Observed by: United States and parts of Northern Mexico
- Type: Federal
- Significance: Emancipation of enslaved people in the United States
- Celebrations: Festivals, parties, parades, church services
- Observances: African-American history, culture, and progress
- Date: June 19 (Note: The holiday name is a portmanteau of June and nineteenth.)
- Frequency: Annually
- First time: June 19, 1866 (celebration); June 19, 2021 (federal holiday) (Note: First observed on Federal calendars on Friday, June 18, 2021, then Monday, June 20, 2022, per Federal law (5 U.S.C. § 6103), establishing that holidays falling on a Saturday or Sunday are observed on the Friday prior (if the holiday falls on Saturday) or the Monday following (if the holiday falls on Sunday).)
- Started by: Early celebrations were held by Christian churches and the Freedmen's Bureau
- Related to: Emancipation Day

Juneteenth, officially Juneteenth National Independence Day, is a federal holiday in the United States. It is celebrated annually on June 19 to commemorate the end of slavery in the United States. The holiday's name, first used in the 1890s, is a portmanteau of June and nineteenth, referring to June 19, 1865, the day when Major General Gordon Granger ordered the final enforcement of the Emancipation Proclamation in Texas at the end of the American Civil War.

During the Civil War period, slavery came to an end in various areas of the United States at different times. Many enslaved Southerners escaped, demanded wages, stopped work, or took up arms against the Confederacy of slave states. In January 1865, Congress proposed the Thirteenth Amendment to the United States Constitution for the national abolition of slavery. By June 1865, almost all of the enslaved population had been freed by the victorious Union Army or by state abolition laws. When the national abolition amendment was ratified in December, the remaining enslaved people in Delaware and Kentucky were freed.

Early Juneteenth celebrations date back to 1866, at first involving church-centered community gatherings in Texas. They spread across the South among newly freed African-Americans and their descendants and became more commercialized in the 1920s and 1930s, often centering on a food festival. Participants in the Great Migration brought these celebrations to the rest of the country. During the Civil Rights Movement of the 1960s, Juneteenth celebrations were eclipsed by the nonviolent determination to achieve civil rights, but they grew in popularity again in the 1970s, with a focus on African-American freedom and African-American arts. Beginning with Texas by proclamation in 1938, and by legislation in 1979, every U.S. state and the District of Columbia has formally recognized the holiday in some way.

Juneteenth was recognized as a federal holiday in 2021, when the 117th U.S. Congress enacted and President Joe Biden signed the Juneteenth National Independence Day Act into law. Juneteenth became the first new federal holiday since Martin Luther King Jr. Day was adopted in 1983. Juneteenth is also celebrated by the Mascogos, descendants of Black Seminoles who escaped from slavery in 1852 and settled in Coahuila, Mexico.

== Celebrations and traditions ==
What Is Juneteenth?, a 2020 video by the House Democratic Caucus

The holiday is considered the "longest-running African-American holiday" and has been called "America's second Independence Day". Juneteenth falls on June 19 and has often been celebrated on the third Saturday in June. Historian Mitch Kachun notes that celebrations of the end of slavery have three goals: "to celebrate, to educate, and to agitate."

Early celebrations consisted of baseball, fishing, and rodeos. African Americans were often prohibited from using public facilities for their celebrations, so instead they were typically held at churches or outdoors near bodies of water. Celebrations were characterized by elaborate large meals and people wearing their best clothing. It was common for formerly enslaved people and their descendants to make a pilgrimage to Galveston, Texas, where the announcement of emancipation had originally taken place. News coverage of early festivals, Janice Hume and Noah Arceneaux state, "served to assimilate African-American memories within the dominant 'American story'".

Modern observance is primarily in local celebrations. In many places, Juneteenth has become a multicultural holiday. Traditions include public readings of the Emancipation Proclamation which promised freedom, singing traditional songs such as "Swing Low, Sweet Chariot" and "Lift Every Voice and Sing", and reading of works by noted African-American writers, such as Ralph Ellison and Maya Angelou. Celebrations include picnics, rodeos, street fairs, cookouts, family reunions, park parties, historical reenactments, blues festivals, and Miss Juneteenth contests. Red food and drinks are traditionally served during the celebrations, including red velvet cake and strawberry soda, with red meant to represent resilience and joy.

Juneteenth celebrations often include lectures and exhibitions on African-American culture. The modern holiday places much emphasis on teaching about African-American heritage. Karen M. Thomas writes in Emerge that "community leaders have latched on to [Juneteenth] to help instill a sense of heritage and pride in black youth." Celebrations are commonly accompanied by voter registration efforts, the performing of plays, and retelling stories. The holiday is also a celebration of soul food and other cuisine with African-American influences. In Tourism Review International, Anne Donovan and Karen DeBres write that "Barbecue is the centerpiece of most Juneteenth celebrations." Major news networks host specials and marathons on national outlets featuring prominent Black voices.

The Black Seminoles of Nacimiento in Mexico hold a festival and reunion known as el Día de los Negros on June 19. Many former British colonies celebrate Emancipation Day on August 1, commemorating the Slavery Abolition Act 1833. Since 2021, the United Nations has designated August 31 as the International Day for People of African Descent.

== History ==
Abolition of slavery in the various states of the US over time: Abolition of slavery during or shortly after the American Revolution (Vermont, 1777; Massachusetts [including Maine], 1783) The Northwest Ordinance, 1787 Gradual emancipation in New York (starting 1799, ended 1827), Pennsylvania (1780–1857), New Hampshire (1783–1857), Connecticut [including the Western Reserve] (1784–1848), Rhode Island (1784–1853) and New Jersey (starting 1804; ended by Thirteenth Amendment, 1865) The Missouri Compromise, 1821 Effective abolition of slavery by Mexican or joint US/British authority Abolition of slavery by Congressional action, 1861 Abolition of slavery by Congressional action, 1862 Emancipation Proclamation as originally issued, 1 Jan 1863 Subsequent operation of the Emancipation Proclamation in 1863 Abolition of slavery by state action during the Civil War Operation of the Emancipation Proclamation in 1864 Operation of the Emancipation Proclamation in 1865 Thirteenth Amendment to the US constitution, 18 Dec 1865 Territory incorporated into the US after the passage of the Thirteenth Amendment

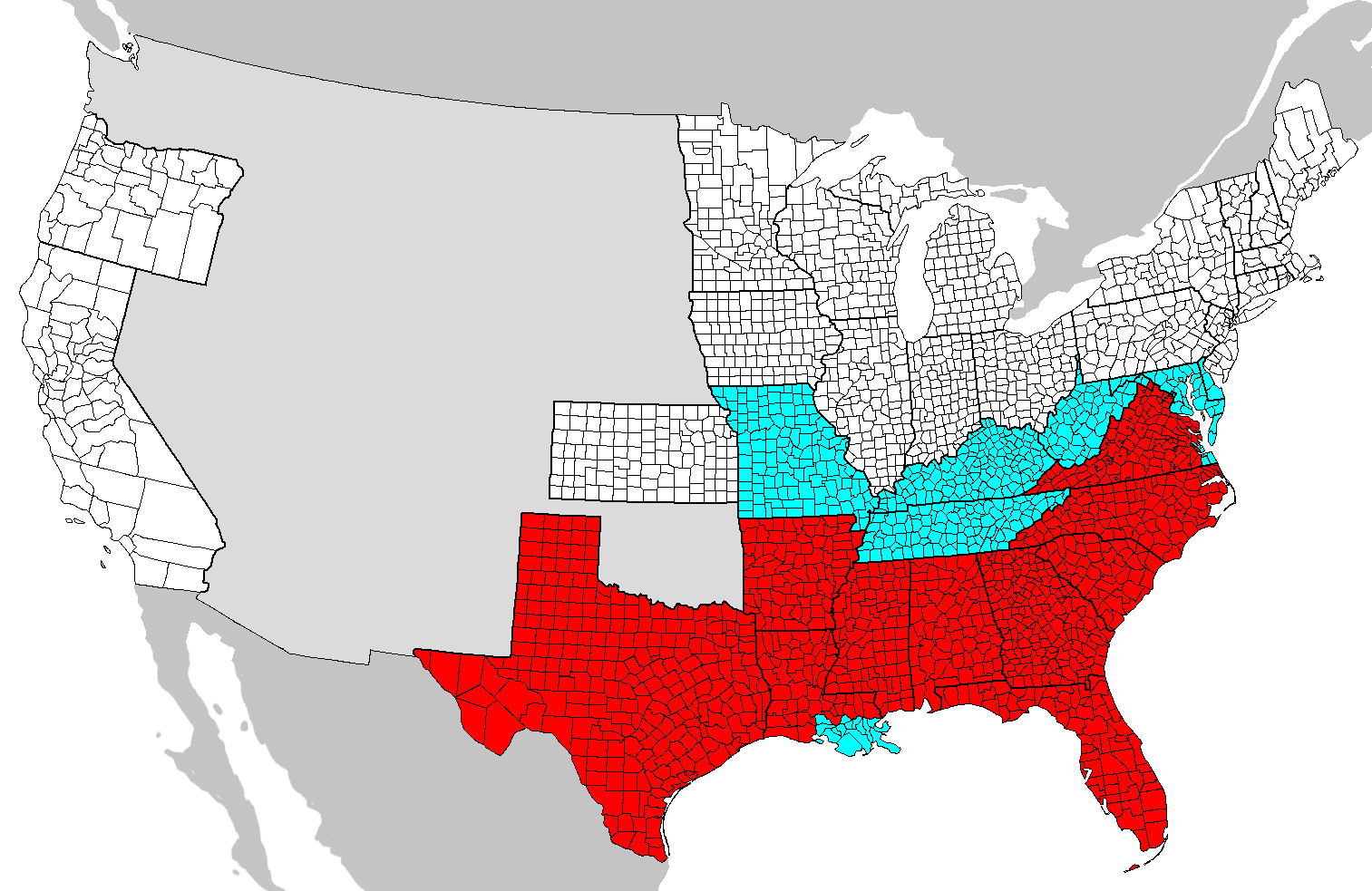
Areas covered by the Emancipation Proclamation are in red. Slave-holding areas not covered are in blue.

On September 22, 1862, President Abraham Lincoln announced that the Emancipation Proclamation would go into effect on January 1, 1863, promising freedom to enslaved people in all of the rebellious parts of Southern states of the Confederacy including Texas. (Note: Enslaved people in Union hands had not been freed by the Emancipation Proclamation due to the limited scope of presidential "war powers". See Emancipation Proclamation#Coverage for more information.) (Note: Although the Emancipation Proclamation declared an end to slavery in the Confederate States, it did not end slavery in the places that were then deemed loyal to the Union (the border states and certain counties or parishes of Virginia and Louisiana). Freedom there generally came through other methods before the end of the war. But as a result, for a short while after the fall of the Confederacy, slavery remained legal in Delaware and Kentucky. Those enslaved people were not freed until the ratification of the Thirteenth Amendment to the Constitution, which abolished chattel slavery nationwide, on December 6, 1865.) Enforcement of the Proclamation generally relied upon the advance of Union troops. Texas, as the most remote state of the former Confederacy, had seen an expansion of slavery because the presence of Union troops was low as the American Civil War ended; thus, the enforcement of the Emancipation Proclamation had been slow and inconsistent there prior to Granger's order. In all June 19, 1865, was 900 days after the Emancipation Proclamation went into effect, 71 days after Robert E. Lee surrendered to the Union on April 9, 1865, and 24 days after the disbanding of the Confederate military department covering Texas on May 26, 1865.

=== Early history ===
==== The Civil War and celebrations of emancipation ====
During the American Civil War (1861–1865), emancipation came at different times in different parts of the Southern United States. Large celebrations of emancipation, often called Jubilees (recalling the biblical Jubilee, in which enslaved people were freed), took place on September 22, January 1, July 4, August 1, April 6, and November 1, among other dates. When emancipation finally came to Texas, on June 19, 1865, as the southern rebellion collapsed, celebration was widespread.

==== End of slavery in Texas ====
Lincoln issued the preliminary Emancipation Proclamation in the midst of the Civil War on September 22, 1862, declaring that if the rebels did not end the fighting and rejoin the Union, all enslaved people in the Confederacy would be freed on the first day of the year. On January 1, 1863, Lincoln issued the final Emancipation Proclamation, declaring that all enslaved people in the Confederate States of America in rebellion and not in Union hands were freed.

Planters and other slaveholders from eastern states had migrated into Texas to escape the fighting, and many brought enslaved people with them, increasing by the thousands the enslaved population in the state at the end of the Civil War. Although most lived in rural areas, more than 1,000 resided in Galveston or Houston by 1860, with several hundred in other large towns. By 1865, there were an estimated 250,000 enslaved people in Texas.

Despite the surrender of Confederate General-in-Chief Robert E. Lee at Appomattox Court House on April 9, 1865, the western Confederate Army of the Trans-Mississippi did not formally surrender until June 2. On the morning of June 19, 1865, Union Major General Gordon Granger arrived on the island of Galveston to take command of the more than 2,000 federal troops recently landed in the department of Texas to enforce the emancipation of its enslaved population and oversee Reconstruction, nullifying all laws passed within Texas during the war by Confederate lawmakers. The order informed all Texans that, in accordance with a Proclamation from the Executive of the United States, all enslaved people were free:

The people of Texas are informed that, in accordance with a proclamation from the Executive of the United States, all slaves are free. This involves an absolute equality of personal rights and rights of property between former masters and slaves, and the connection heretofore existing between them becomes that between employer and hired labor. The freedmen are advised to remain quietly at their present homes and work for wages. They are informed that they will not be allowed to collect at military posts and that they will not be supported in idleness either there or elsewhere.

Longstanding urban legend places a historic reading of General Order No. 3 at Ashton Villa; but no historical evidence supports this claim. There is no evidence that Granger or any of his troops proclaimed the Ordinance by reading it aloud. All indications are that copies of the Ordinance were posted in public places, including the Negro Church on Broadway, since renamed Reedy Chapel A.M.E. Church.

On June 21, 2014, the Galveston Historical Foundation and Texas Historical Commission erected a Juneteenth plaque where the Osterman Building once stood signifying the location of Major General Granger's Union Headquarters believed to be where he issued his general orders.

Although this event commemorates the end of slavery, emancipation for the remaining enslaved population in two Union border states, Delaware and Kentucky, would not come until December 6, 1865, when the Thirteenth Amendment was ratified. (Note: Unlike in Texas, where slavery grew during the war, in Kentucky, due largely to Union military measures and escapes to Union lines, the number of those enslaved fell by over 70%.) The federal amendment also put a definitive end to chattel slavery and indentured servitude in New Jersey, freeing approximately 16 elderly individuals. (Note: The New Jersey state legislature's Act for the Gradual Abolition of Slavery applied to children born to enslaved mothers after July 4, 1804, but it made no provision for freeing those born before that date.) Furthermore, thousands of black slaves were not freed until after the Reconstruction Treaties of late 1866, when the Cherokee, Creek, Chickasaw, Choctaw, and Seminole tribes were forced to sign new treaties that required them to free their slaves.

The freedom of formerly enslaved people in Texas was given state law status in a series of Texas Supreme Court decisions between 1868 and 1874.

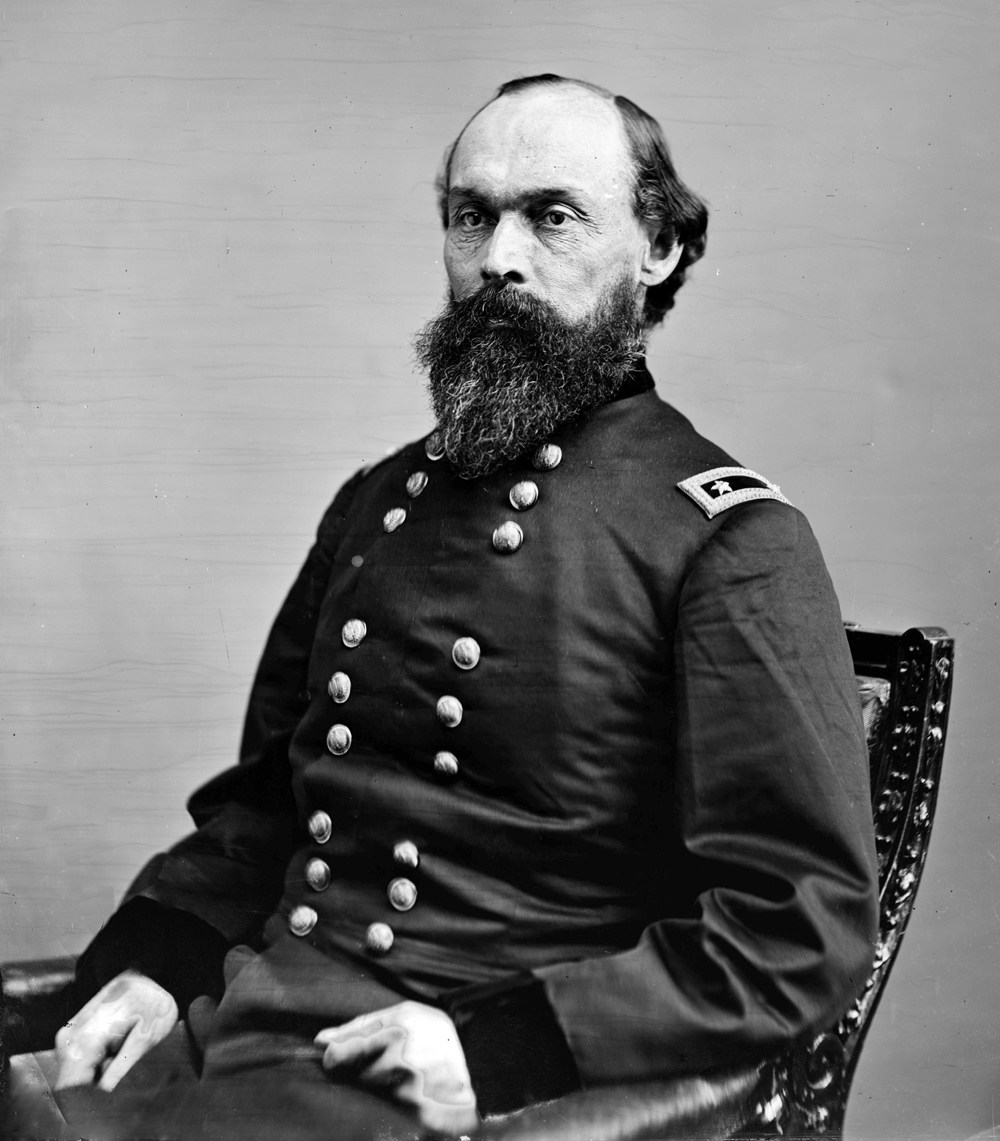
Major General Gordon Granger issued General Order No. 3 formally informing Texas residents that slavery had ended.

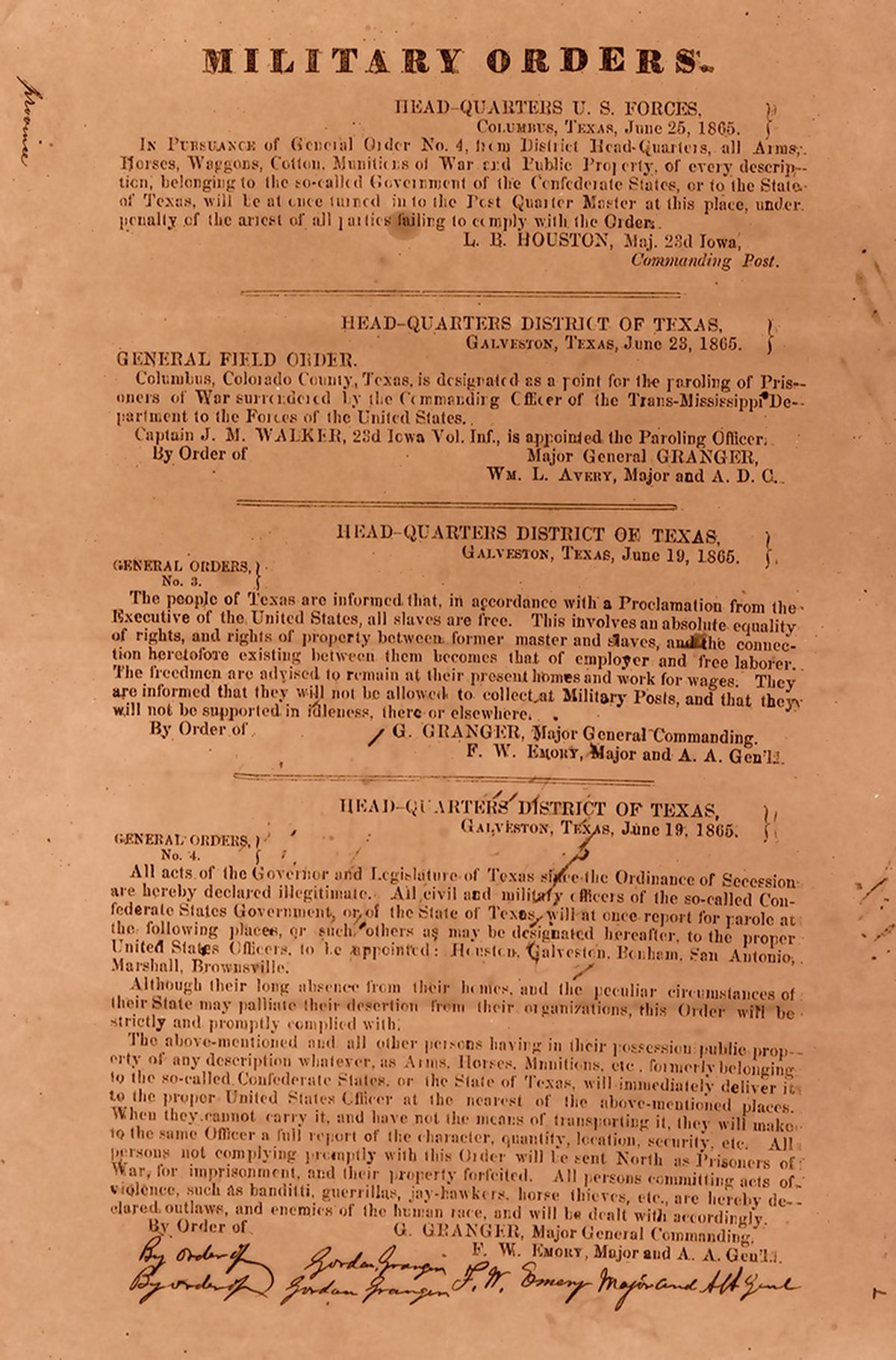
General Order No. 3, June 19, 1865

==== Early Juneteenth celebrations ====
Formerly enslaved people in Galveston rejoiced after General Order No. 3. One year later, on June 19, 1866, freedmen in Texas organized the first of what became annual commemorations of "Jubilee Day". Early celebrations were used as political rallies to give voting instructions to newly freed African Americans. Other independence observances occurred on January 1 or 4.

While that date did not actually mark the unequivocal end of slavery, even in Texas, June 19 came to be a day of shared commemoration across the United States – created, preserved, and spread by ordinary African Americans – of slavery's wartime demise.

In some cities, Black people were barred from using public parks because of state-sponsored segregation of facilities. Across parts of Texas, freed people pooled their funds to purchase land to hold their celebrations. The day was first celebrated in Austin in 1867 under the auspices of the Freedmen's Bureau, and it had been listed on a "calendar of public events" by 1872. That year, Black leaders in Texas raised $1,000 for the purchase of 10 acres (4 ha) of land, today known as Houston's Emancipation Park, to celebrate Juneteenth.

The observation was soon drawing thousands of attendees across Texas. In Limestone County, an estimated 30,000 Black people celebrated at Booker T. Washington Park, established in 1898 for Juneteenth celebrations. The Black community began using the word Juneteenth for Jubilee Day early in the 1890s. Usage of the word Juneteenth was reported on in the Brenham Weekly Banner, a newspaper from Brenham, Texas, as early as 1891. Mentions of Juneteenth celebrations outside of Texas appeared as early as 1909 in Shreveport, Louisiana.

==== Decline of celebrations during the Jim Crow era ====
In the early 20th century, economic and political forces led to a decline in Juneteenth celebrations. From 1890 to 1908, Texas and all former Confederate states passed new constitutions or amendments that effectively disenfranchised Black people, excluding them from the political process. White-dominated state legislatures passed Jim Crow laws imposing second-class status. Gladys L. Knight writes the decline in celebration was in part because "upwardly mobile blacks ... were ashamed of their slave past and aspired to assimilate into mainstream culture. Younger generations of blacks, becoming further removed from slavery were occupied with school ... and other pursuits." Others who migrated to the Northern United States could not take time off or simply dropped the celebration.

The Great Depression forced many Black people off farms and into the cities to find work, where they had difficulty taking the day off to celebrate. From 1936 to 1951, the Texas State Fair served as a destination for celebrating the holiday, contributing to its revival. In 1936, an estimated 150,000 to 200,000 people joined the holiday's celebration in Dallas. In 1938, Governor of Texas James Allred issued a proclamation stating in part:

Whereas, the Negroes in the State of Texas observe June 19 as the official day for the celebration of Emancipation from slavery; and

Whereas, June 19, 1865, was the date when General [Gordon] Granger, who had command of the Military District of Texas, issued a proclamation notifying the Negroes of Texas that they were free; and

Whereas, since that time, Texas Negroes have observed this day with suitable holiday ceremony, except during such years when the day comes on a Sunday; when the Governor of the State is asked to proclaim the following day as the holiday for State observance by Negroes; and

Whereas, June 19, 1938, this year falls on Sunday; NOW, THEREFORE, I, JAMES V. ALLRED, Governor of the State of Texas, do set aside and proclaim the day of June 20, 1938, as the date for observance of EMANCIPATION DAY

in Texas, and do urge all members of the Negro race in Texas to observe the day in a manner appropriate to its importance to them.

Seventy thousand people attended a "Juneteenth Jamboree" in 1951. From 1940 through 1970, in the second wave of the Great Migration, more than five million Black people left Texas, Louisiana and other parts of the South for the North and the West Coast. As historian Isabel Wilkerson writes, "The people from Texas took Juneteenth Day to Los Angeles, Oakland, Seattle, and other places they went." In 1945, Juneteenth was introduced in San Francisco by a migrant from Texas, Wesley Johnson.

During the 1950s and 1960s, the Civil Rights Movement focused the attention of African Americans on expanding freedom and integrating. As a result, observations of the holiday declined again, though it was still celebrated in Texas.

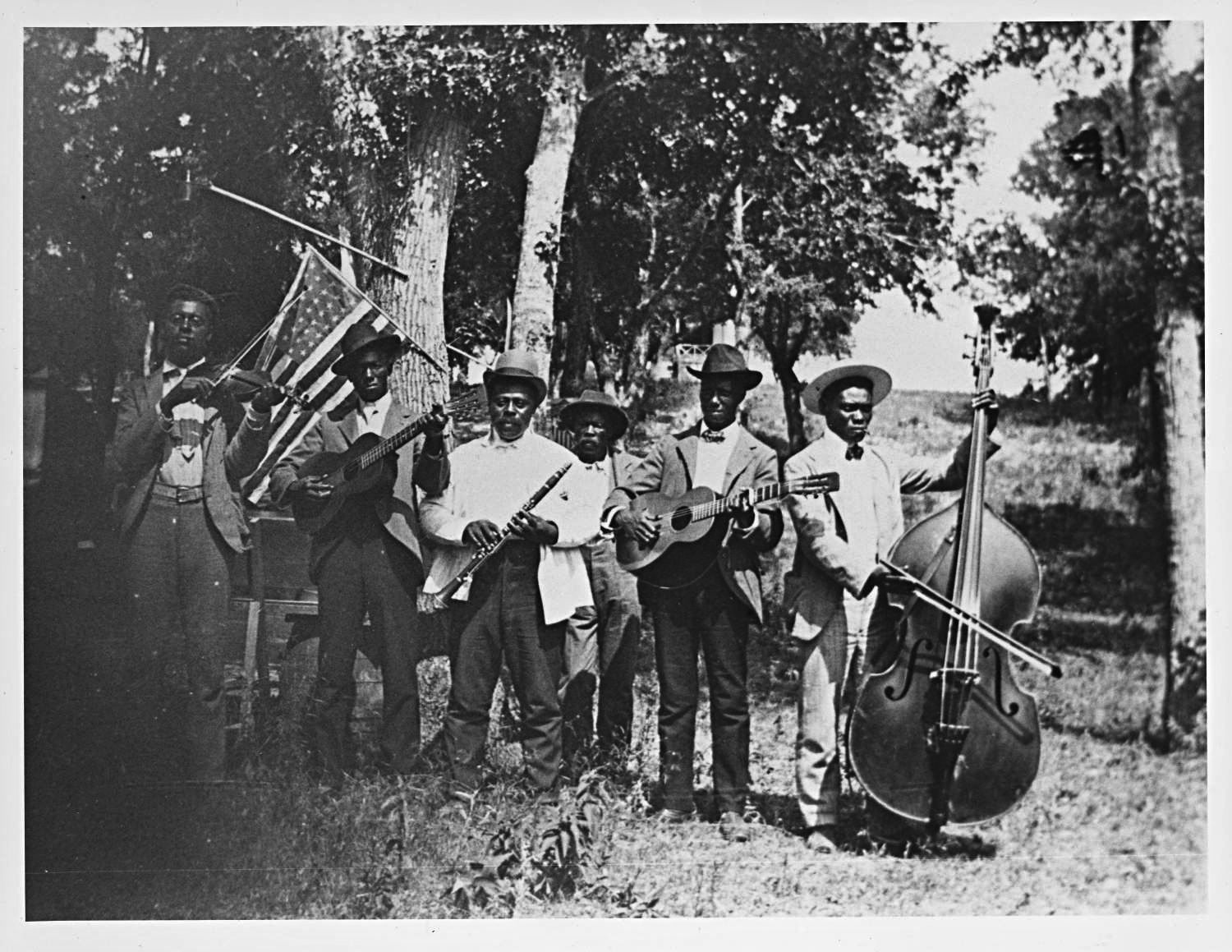
Band performing in Texas for Emancipation Day, 1900

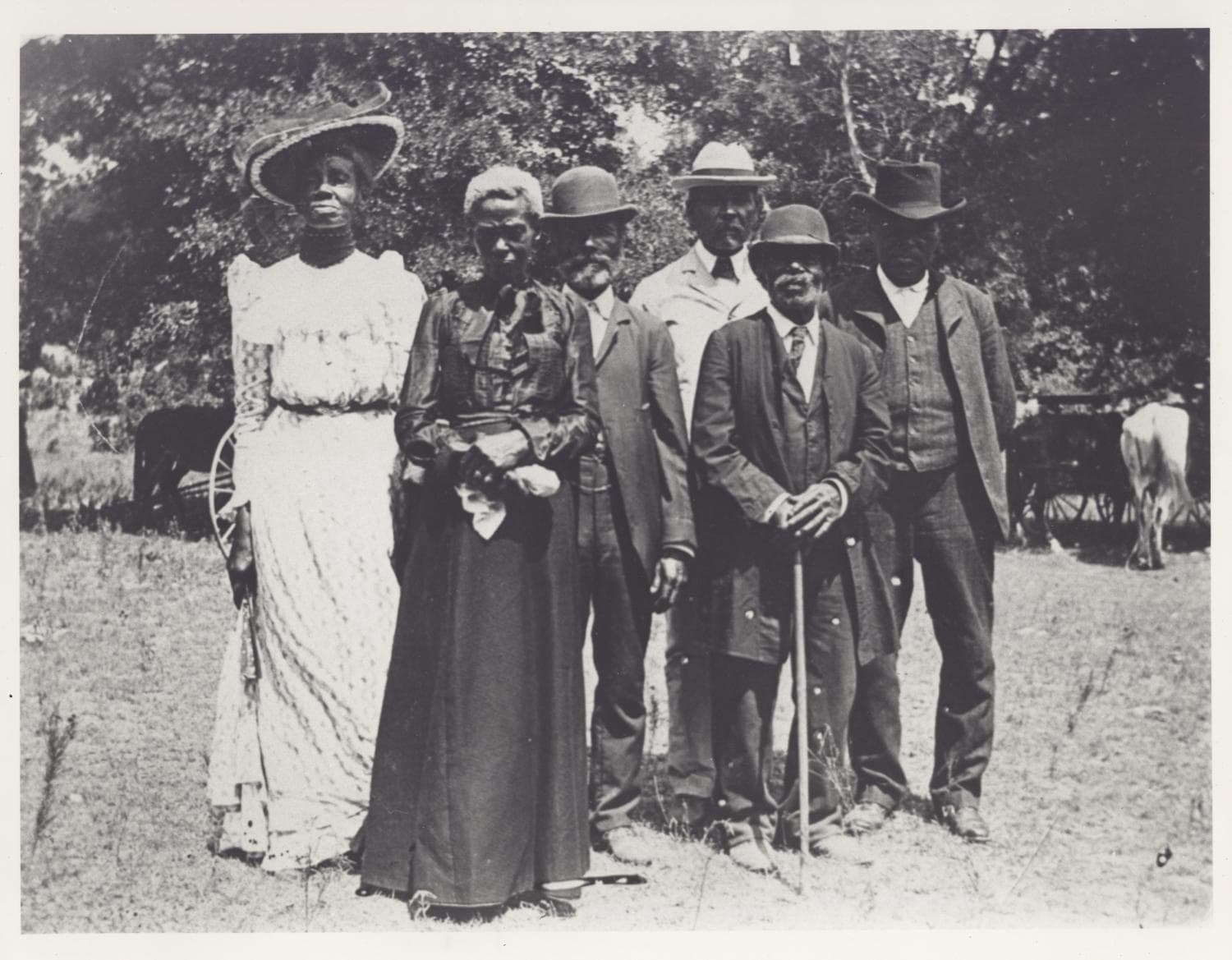
Celebration of Emancipation Day in 1900, Texas

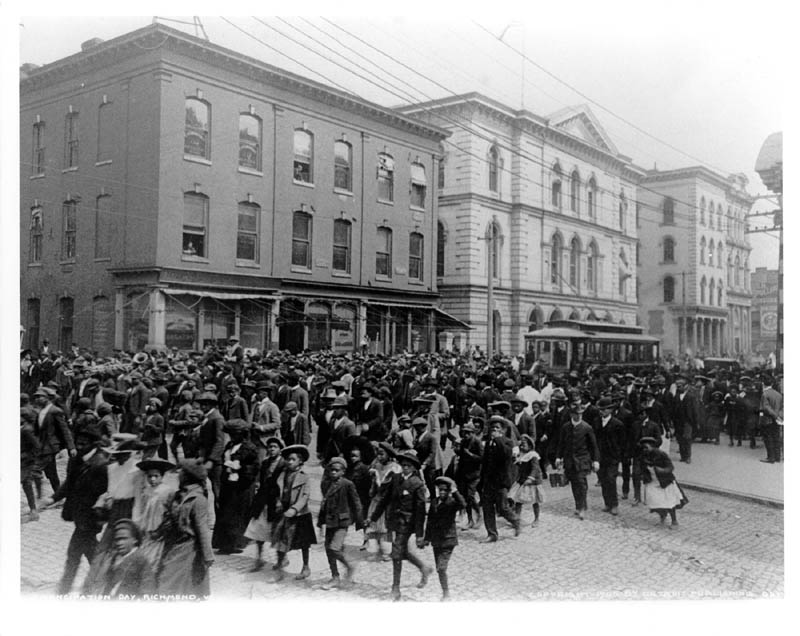
Emancipation Day celebration in Richmond, Virginia, 1905

=== Revival of celebrations ===
==== 1960s–1980s ====
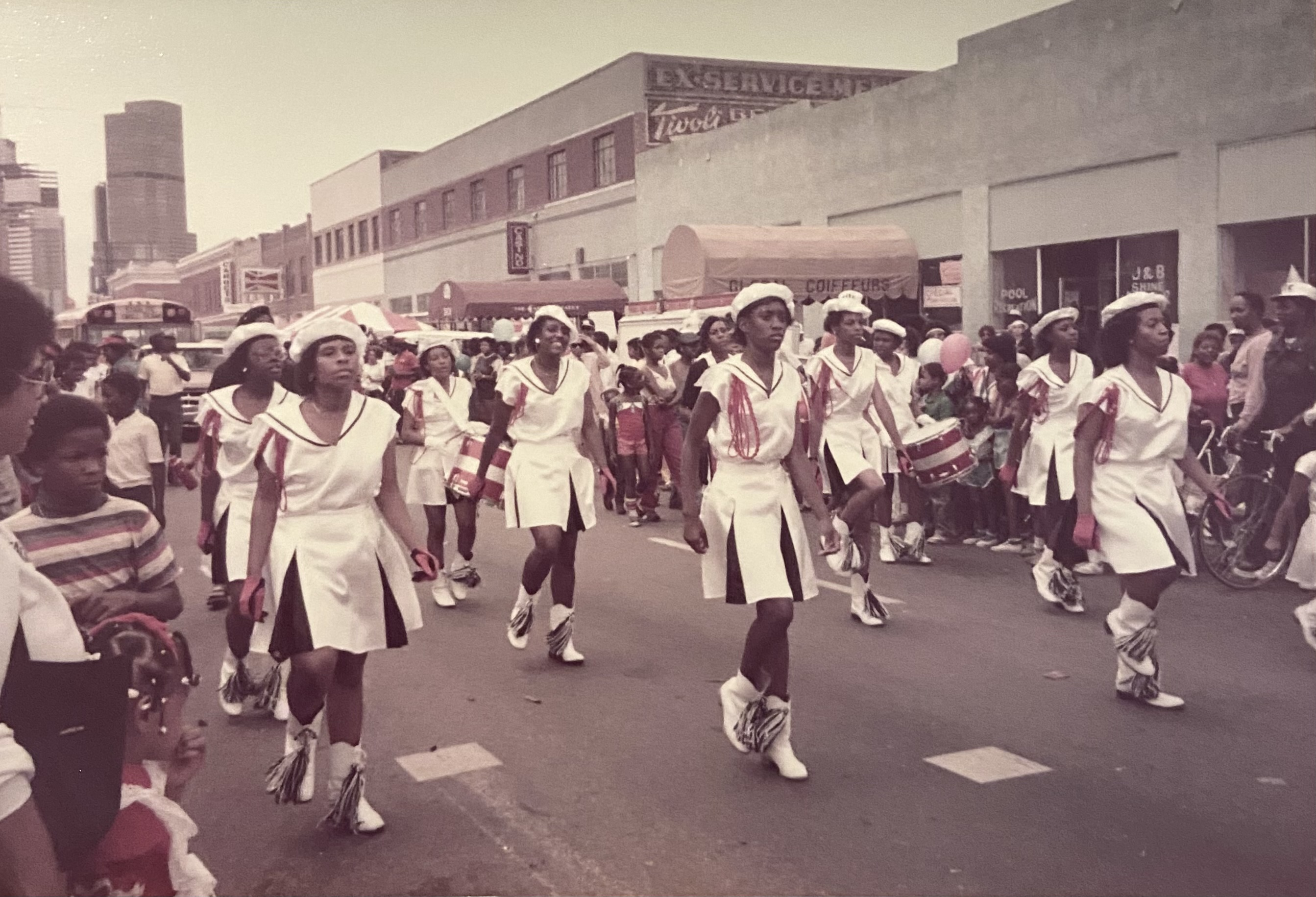
Parade circa 1980 in Denver, Colorado

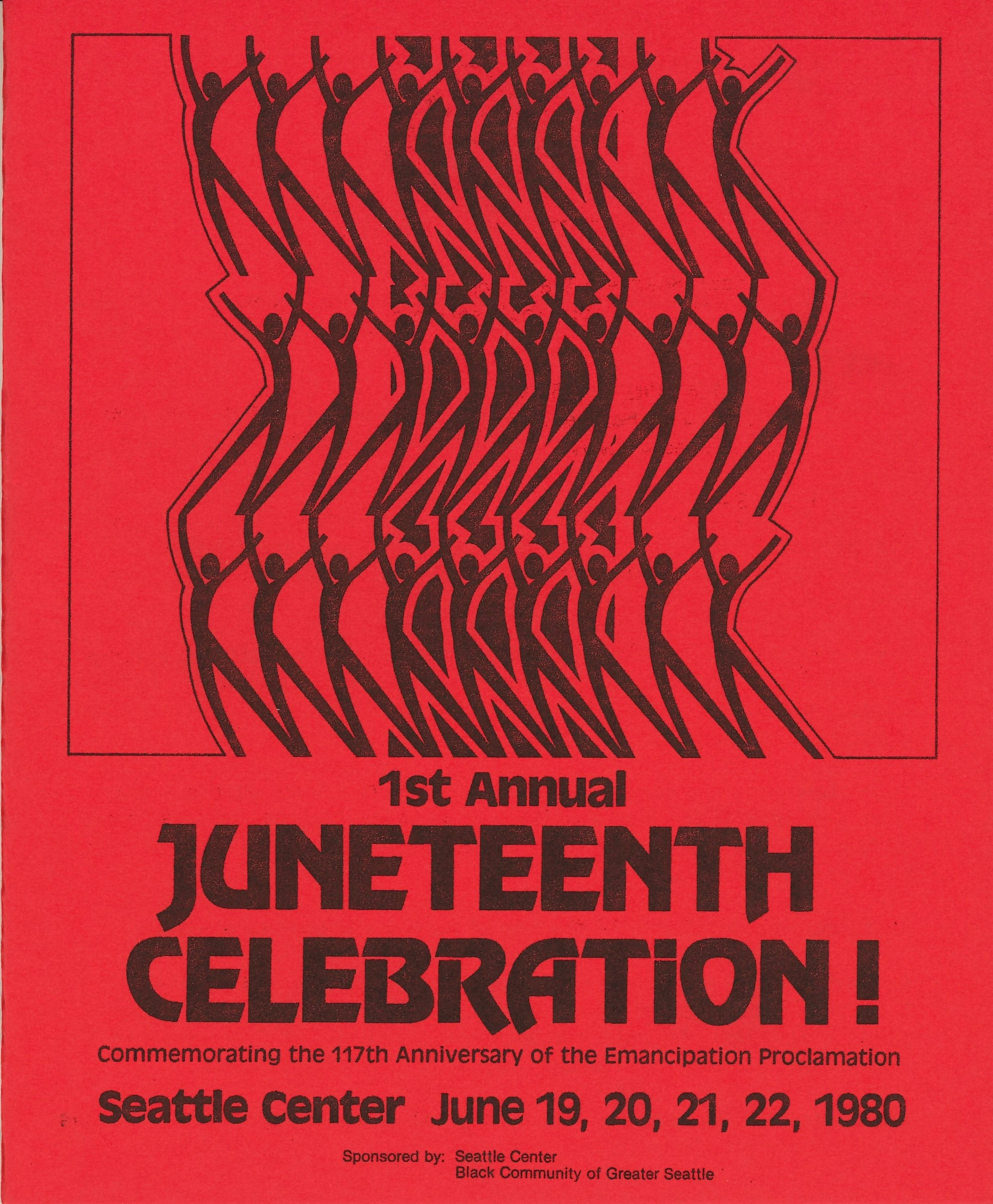
Flyer for a 1980 Juneteenth celebration at the Seattle Center

Juneteenth soon saw a revival as Black people began tying their struggle to that of ending slavery. In Atlanta, some campaigners for equality wore Juneteenth buttons. During the 1968 Poor People's Campaign to Washington, DC, called by Rev. Ralph Abernathy, the Southern Christian Leadership Conference made June 19 the "Solidarity Day of the Poor People's Campaign". In the subsequent revival, large celebrations in Minneapolis and Milwaukee emerged, as well as across the Eastern United States.

In 1974, Houston began holding large-scale celebrations again, and Fort Worth, Texas, followed the next year. Around 30,000 people attended festivities at Sycamore Park in Fort Worth the following year. The 1978 Milwaukee celebration was described as drawing more than 100,000 attendees. In 1979, the Texas Legislature made the occasion a state holiday. In the late 1980s, there were major celebrations of Juneteenth in California, Wisconsin, Illinois, Georgia, and Washington, D.C.

==== Prayer breakfast and commemorative celebrations ====
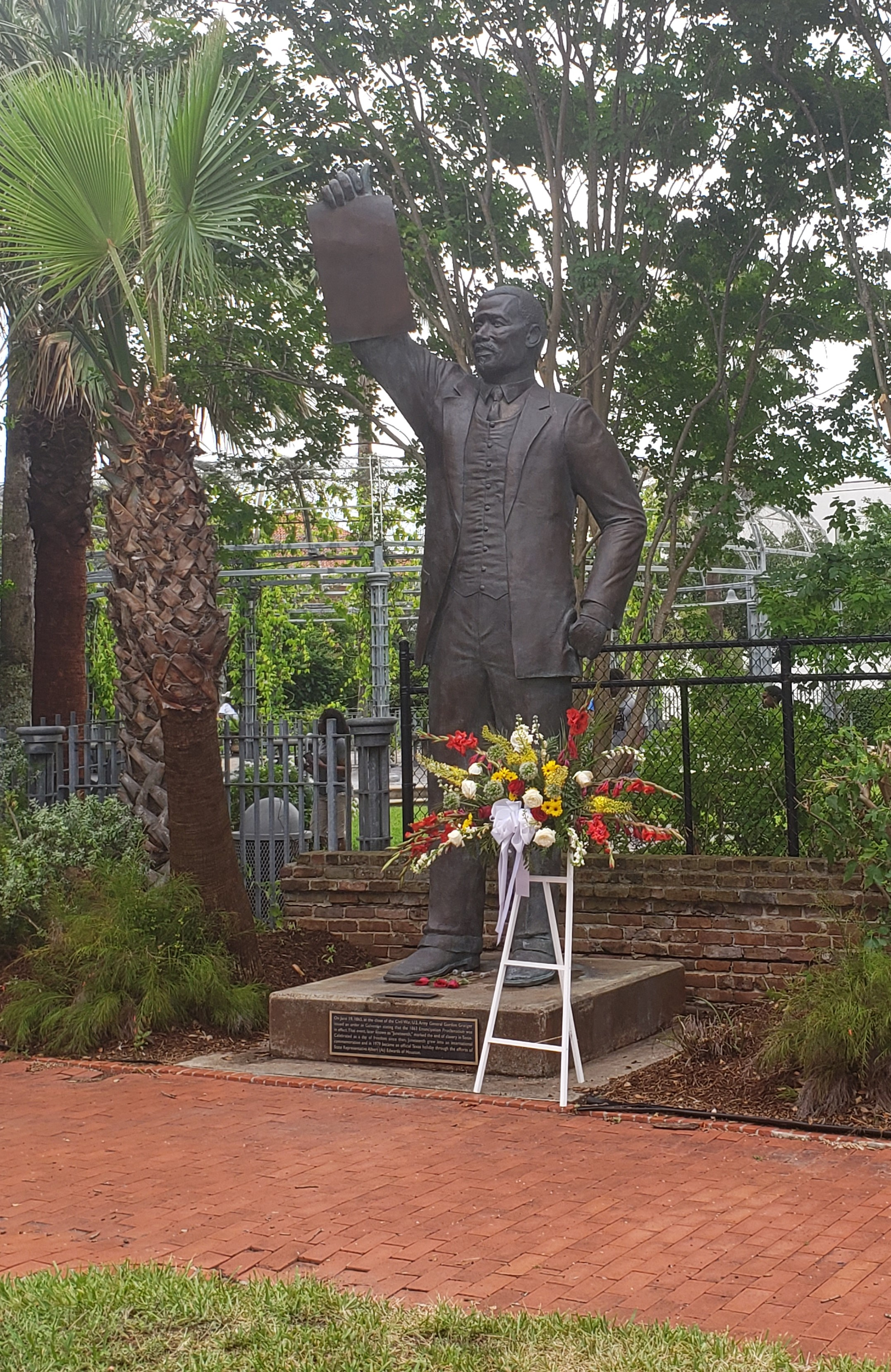
Al Edwards statue

In 1979, Democratic State Representative Al Edwards of Houston successfully sponsored legislation to make Juneteenth a paid Texas state holiday. The same year, he hosted the inaugural Al Edwards prayer breakfast and commemorative celebration on the grounds of the 1859 home, Ashton Villa. As one of the few existing buildings from the Civil War era and popular in local myth and legend as the location of Major General Granger's order, Edwards's annual celebration includes a local historian dressed as the Union general reading General Order No. 3 from the second-story balcony of the home. The Emancipation Proclamation is also read and speeches are made. Representative Al Edwards died of natural causes April 29, 2020, at the age of 83, but the annual prayer breakfast and commemorative celebration continued at Ashton Villa, with the late legislator's son Jason Edwards speaking in his father's place.

==== Official statewide recognitions ====
In the late 1970s, when the Texas Legislature declared Juneteenth a "holiday of significance ... particularly to the blacks of Texas", it became the first state to establish Juneteenth as a state holiday. The bill passed through the Texas Legislature in 1979 and was officially made a state holiday on January 1, 1980. During the 1980s and 1990s, the holiday became more widely celebrated among African-American communities across the country and received increasing mainstream attention. Before 2000, three more U.S. states officially observed the day, and over the next two decades it was recognized as an official observance in all states, except South Dakota, until becoming a federal holiday.

==== Juneteenth in pop culture and the mass media ====
Ralph Ellison's 1965 short story "Juneteenth" in the Quarterly Review of Literature, an excerpt from his novel in progress of the same name, brought the holiday to more widespread attention. In 1991, there was an exhibition by the Anacostia Community Museum (part of the Smithsonian Institution) called "Juneteenth '91, Freedom Revisited". In 1994, a group of community leaders gathered at Christian Unity Baptist Church in New Orleans to work for greater national celebration of Juneteenth. International awareness arose as expatriates and U.S. military bases overseas celebrated Juneteenth in cities abroad, such as Paris. In 1999, Ralph Ellison's novel Juneteenth was posthumously published, increasing recognition of the holiday. By 2006, at least 200 cities across the United States celebrated the day.

The holiday gained mainstream awareness outside African-American communities through depictions in media, such as episodes of TV series Atlanta (2016) and Black-ish (2017), the latter of which featured musical numbers about the holiday by Aloe Blacc, The Roots, and Fonzworth Bentley.

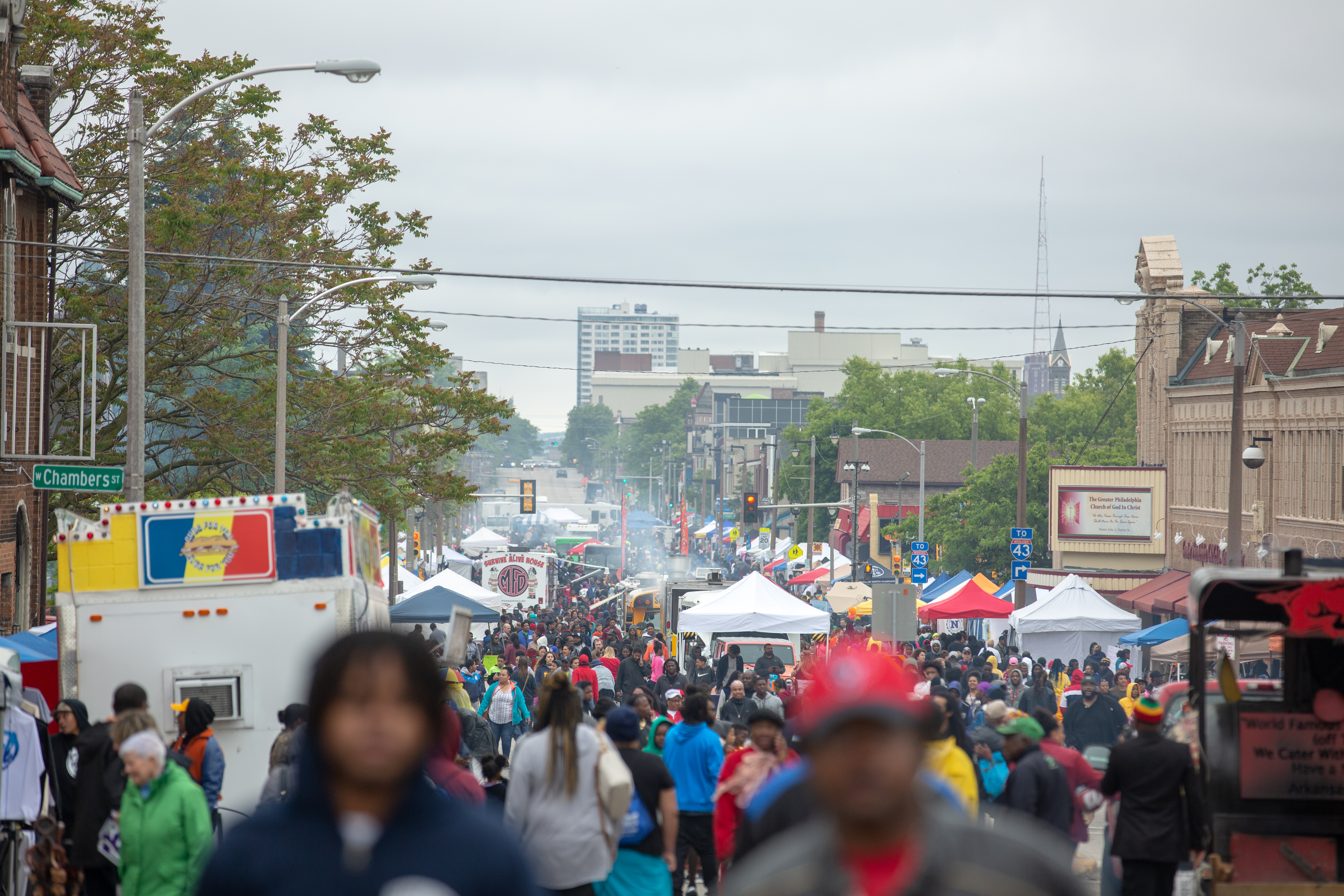
A Juneteenth festival in Milwaukee, 2019

In 2018, Apple added Juneteenth to its calendars in iOS under official U.S. holidays. Private companies began to adopt Juneteenth as a paid day off for employees, while others officially marked the day in ceremonial ways, such as holding a moment of silence. In 2020, additional American corporations and educational institutions, including Twitter, the National Football League, Nike, began treating Juneteenth as a company holiday, providing a paid day off to their workers, and Google Calendar added Juneteenth to its U.S. Holidays calendar. Also in 2020, a number of major universities formally recognized Juneteenth, either as a "day of reflection" or as a university holiday with paid time off for faculty and staff.

The 2020 mother-daughter film on the holiday's pageant culture, Miss Juneteenth, featured African-American women "determined to stand on their own" while confronting sexist tendencies within their community.

==== Becoming a federal holiday ====
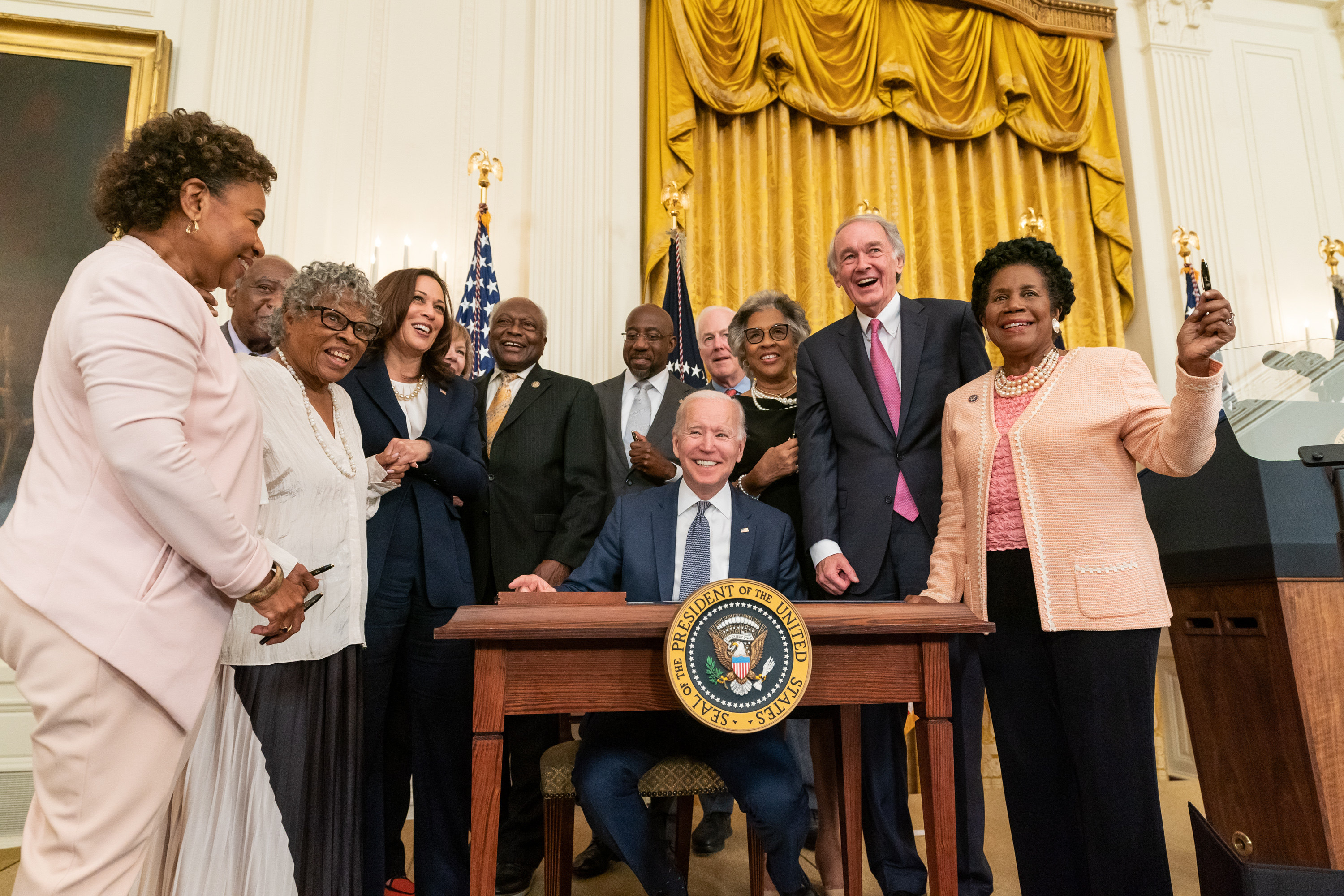
President Joe Biden signed the Juneteenth National Independence Day Act into law, June 17, 2021. Opal Lee is third from left.

In 1996, the first federal legislation to recognize "Juneteenth Independence Day" was introduced in the U.S. House of Representatives, H.J. Res. 195, sponsored by Barbara-Rose Collins (D-MI). In 1997, Congress recognized the day through Senate Joint Resolution 11 and House Joint Resolution 56. In 2013, the U.S. Senate passed Senate Resolution 175, acknowledging Lula Briggs Galloway (late president of the National Association of Juneteenth Lineage), who "successfully worked to bring national recognition to Juneteenth Independence Day", and the continued leadership of the National Juneteenth Observance Foundation.

In the 2000s and 2010s, activists continued a long process to push Congress towards official recognition of Juneteenth. Organizations such as the National Juneteenth Observance Foundation sought a Congressional designation of Juneteenth as a national day of observance. By 2016, 45 states were recognizing the occasion. Activist Opal Lee, often referred to as the "grandmother of Juneteenth", campaigned for decades to make Juneteenth a federal holiday, leading walks in many states to promote the idea. In 2016–17 at the age of 89, she led a symbolic walk from Fort Worth, Texas to Washington D.C. to advocate for the federal holiday. When it was officially made a federal holiday on June 17, 2021, she was standing beside President Joe Biden as he signed the bill.

Juneteenth became one of five date-specific federal holidays along with New Year's Day (January 1), Independence Day (July 4), Veterans Day (November 11), and Christmas Day (December 25). Juneteenth is the first new federal holiday since Martin Luther King Jr. Day was declared a holiday in 1986. Juneteenth also falls within the statutory Honor America Days period, which lasts for 21 days from Flag Day (June 14) to Independence Day (July 4).

== The Juneteenth Flag ==
In 1997, activist Ben Haith created the Juneteenth flag, which was further refined by illustrator Lisa Jeanne Graf. In 2000, the flag was first hoisted at the Roxbury Heritage State Park in Boston by Haith. The star at the center represents Texas and the extension of freedom for all African Americans throughout the whole nation. The burst around the star represents a nova and the red curve represents a horizon, standing for a new era for African Americans. The red, white, and blue colors represent the American flag, which shows that African Americans and their enslaved ancestors are Americans, and the national belief in liberty and justice for all citizens.

== Legal observance ==
=== State and local holiday ===
Adoption of Juneteenth as a commemoration or holiday in the US by states, in the years before the federal holiday in 2021: Recognized before 2000 Recognized between 2000 and 2009 Recognized between 2010 and 2021 As of 2023, 24 of these states and the District of Columbia have also made it a paid holiday for state or district workers. Federal government employees in all states are covered by the federal holiday.

Texas was the first state to recognize the date by enacted law, in 1980. By 2002, eight states officially recognized Juneteenth and four years later 15 states recognized the holiday. By 2008, just over half of the states recognized Juneteenth in some way. By 2019, 47 states and the District of Columbia recognized Juneteenth, although as of 2020 only Texas had adopted the holiday as a paid holiday for state employees.

In June 2019, Governor of Pennsylvania Tom Wolf recognized Juneteenth as a holiday in the state. In the yearlong aftermath of the murder of George Floyd that occurred on May 25, 2020, nine states designated Juneteenth a paid holiday, including New York, Washington, and Virginia. In 2020, Massachusetts Governor Charlie Baker issued a proclamation that the day would be marked as "Juneteenth Independence Day". This followed the filing of bills by both the House and Senate to make Juneteenth a state holiday. Baker did not comment on these bills specifically but promised to grant the observance of Juneteenth greater importance. On June 16, 2021, Illinois adopted a law changing its ceremonial holiday to a paid state holiday.

Some cities and counties have also recognized Juneteenth through proclamation. In 2020, Juneteenth was formally recognized by New York City (as an annual official city holiday and public school holiday, starting in 2021). Cook County, Illinois, adopted an ordinance to make Juneteenth a paid county holiday. The City and County of Honolulu recognizes it as an "annual day of honor and reflection", and Portland, Oregon (as a day of remembrance and action and a paid holiday for city employees).

North Dakota approved recognition of Juneteenth as a state-recognized annual holiday on April 13, 2021, with Hawaii becoming the 49th state to recognize the holiday on June 16, 2021. (Note: In June 2020, Hawaii's first African-American Miss Hawaii USA, Samantha Neyland, founded Hawaii for Juneteenth, a coalition and grassroots movement. Hawaii for Juneteenth lobbied the Hawaii State Legislature into successfully passing SB939, introduced by Senator Glenn Wakai and signed into law by Governor David Ige on June 16, 2021.) On June 16, 2020, South Dakota Governor Kristi Noem proclaimed that the following June 19, 2020, was to be Juneteenth Day for that year only, spurning calls for it to be recognized annually, rather than just for 2020. In February 2022, South Dakota became the last state to recognize Juneteenth as an annual state holiday or observance. Its law provided for following the federal law even before it was official. On May 2, 2022, Colorado Governor Jared Polis signed a bill changing the state's ceremonial observance to a state holiday and it is now the 11th state holiday in Colorado.

As of 2024, 27 states and the District of Columbia have made Juneteenth an annualized paid holiday for state employees, with the remainder maintaining at least a ceremonial observance (New Mexico's personnel board declared it a paid worker holiday, although it is not a statutory holiday in New Mexico). Additional states may observe it as a paid holiday for state workers but rely on a decision, often of the governor, in each year, instead of perpetual by statute, which may or may not occur again the next year. Local governments including counties and municipalities also may close their offices and pay their workers time-off. The table below only includes the states with perpetual, annual, paid holiday laws identified by the Congressional Research Service in 2023 or subsequent sources:

States and Juneteenth paid holiday
| State or insular area | First official observance | Paid state holiday adopted | Notes |
|---|---|---|---|
| Alaska | 2001 | 2024 | |
| California | 2003 | 2022 | |
| Colorado | 2004 | 2022 | |
| Connecticut | 2003 | 2023 | |
| Delaware | 2000 | 2021 | |
| District of Columbia | 2003 | 2021 | |
| Georgia | 2011 | 2022 | |
| Idaho | 2001 | 2021 | |
| Illinois | 2003 | 2021 | |
| Kentucky | 2022 | 2024 | |
| Louisiana | 2003 | 2021 | |
| Maine | 2011 | 2021 | |
| Maryland | 2014 | 2022 | |
| Massachusetts | 2007 | 2022 | |
| Minnesota | 1996 | 2023 | |
| Missouri | 2003 | 2022 | |
| Nebraska | 2009 | 2022 | |
| Nevada | 2011 | 2022 | |
| New Jersey | 2004 | 2020 | Observed on the third Friday in June |
| New Mexico | 2006 | 2022 | |
| New York | 2004 | 2020 | |
| Ohio | 2006 | 2021 | |
| Oregon | 2001 | 2021 | |
| South Dakota | 2021 | 2022 | |
| Tennessee | 2007 | 2023 | |
| Texas | 1938 | 1980 | |
| Utah | 2016 | 2022 | |
| Vermont | 2007 | 2024 | |
| Virginia | 2007 | 2020 | |
| Washington | 2007 | 2021 | |

=== Federal holiday ===
Juneteenth National Independence Day Act
- Long title: An Act to amend title 5, United States Code, to designate Juneteenth National Independence Day as a legal public holiday.
- Enacted by: the 117th United States Congress
- Effective: June 17, 2021

Citations
- Public law: Pub. L. 117–17 (text) (PDF)
- Statutes at Large: 135 Stat. 287

Codification
- Titles amended: Title 5—Government Organization and Employees
- U.S.C. sections amended: 5 U.S.C. § 6103

Legislative history
- Introduced in the Senate as S. 475 by Ed Markey (D–MA) on February 25, 2021; Passed the Senate on June 15, 2021 (unanimous consent); Passed the House on June 16, 2021 (415–14); Signed into law by President Joe Biden on June 17, 2021

Juneteenth is a federal holiday in the United States. For decades, activists and congress members (led by many African Americans) proposed legislation, advocated for, and built support for state and national observances. During his campaign for president in June 2020, Joe Biden publicly celebrated the holiday. President Donald Trump, during his 2020 campaign for reelection, added making the day a national holiday part of his "Platinum Plan for Black America". Spurred on by Opal Lee, the racial justice movement and the Congressional Black Caucus, on June 15, 2021, the Senate unanimously passed the Juneteenth National Independence Day Act, establishing Juneteenth as a federal holiday. It passed through the House of Representatives by a 415–14 vote on June 16.

President Joe Biden signed the bill (Pub. L. 117–17 (text) (PDF)) on June 17, 2021, making Juneteenth the eleventh American federal holiday and the first to obtain legal observance as a federal holiday since Martin Luther King Jr. Day was designated in 1983. According to the bill, federal government employees will now get to take the day off every year on June 19, or should the date fall on a Saturday or Sunday, they will get the Friday or Monday closest to the Saturday or Sunday on which the date falls. Juneteenth is observed with the closure of post offices, banks, the NYSE and Nasdaq stock exchanges and other financial markets, most government offices, and many schools, universities, and private businesses.

In January 2025, President Donald Trump issued an executive order banning diversity, equity, and inclusion programs in federal agencies that has been interpreted by various agencies as eliminating in-agency observance planning for a number of cultural remembrance events, including Juneteenth, Black History Month, and several others. Nonetheless, for February 2025, Trump issued the traditional presidential proclamation calling on officials to commemorate Black History Month. In December 2025 however, free entry to national parks on MLK Day and Juneteenth was ended; and replaced by free entry on Flag Day, an unofficial holiday, which is also Trump's birthday.

== See also ==
- History of African Americans in Texas
- Independence Day (United States)
- List of African-American holidays
- National Freedom Day
- Negro Election Day
- Public holidays in the United States

== General and cited references ==
- Barr, Alwyn (1996). Black Texans: A History of African Americans in Texas, 1528–1995. University of Oklahoma Press. ISBN 978-0806128788.
- Blanck, Emily. "Galveston on San Francisco Bay: Juneteenth in the Fillmore District, 1945–2016." Western Historical Quarterly 50.2 (2019): 85–112. Galveston on San Francisco Bay: Juneteenth in the Fillmore District, 1945–2016
- Cromartie, J. Vern. "Freedom Came at Different Times: A Comparative Analysis of Emancipation Day and Juneteenth Celebrations." NAAAS Conference Proceedings. National Association of African American Studies, (2014) online.
- Donovan, Anne, and Karen De Bres. "Foods of freedom: Juneteenth as a culinary tourist attraction." Tourism Review International 9.4 (2006): 379–389. link
- Gordon-Reed, Annette (2021). On Juneteenth, New York: Liveright Publishing Corporation. ISBN 978-1631498831. OCLC 1196176524
- Guzzio, Tracie Church (1999). "Juneteenth". In Samuels, Wilford D. (ed.). Encyclopedia of African-American Literature. Facts on File.
- Hume, Noah; Arceneaux, Janice (2008). "Public Memory, Cultural Legacy, and Press Coverage of the Juneteenth Revival". Journalism History. 34 (3): 155–162. doi:10.1080/00947679.2008.12062768. S2CID 142605823.
- Jaynes, Gerald David (2005). "Juneteenth". Encyclopedia of African American Society. Vol. 1. Sage Publications. pp. 481–482. ISBN 9781452265414.
- Knight, Gladys L. (2011). "Juneteenth". Encyclopedia of African American Popular Culture. Greenwood. pp. 798–801. OCLC 694734649.
- Mustakeem, Sowandé (2007). "Juneteenth". In Rodriguez, Junius (ed.). Encyclopedia of Emancipation and Abolition in the Transatlantic World. Routledge.
- Taylor, Charles A. (2002). Juneteenth: A Celebration of Freedom. Open Hand Pub Llc. ISBN 978-0940880689.
- Turner, E. H. "Juneteenth: The Evolution of an Emancipation Celebration." European Contributions to American Studies. 65 (2006): 69–81.
- Wiggins, William H. Jr. "They Closed the Town Up, Man! Reflections on the Civic and Political Dimensions of Juneteenth." in Celebration: Studies in Festivity and Ritual, ed. Victor Turner (1982): 284–295.
- Wilson, Charles R. (2006). The New Encyclopedia of Southern Culture: Volume 4: Myth, Manners, and Memory. University of North Carolina Press. ISBN 978-0807830291. JSTOR 10.5149/9781469616704_wilson.
- Wynn, Linda T. (2009). "Juneteenth". In Carney Smith, Jessica (ed.). Freedom Facts and Firsts: 400 Years of the African American Civil Rights Experience. Credo Reference.
