= Ben Haith =

American activist (born 1942)

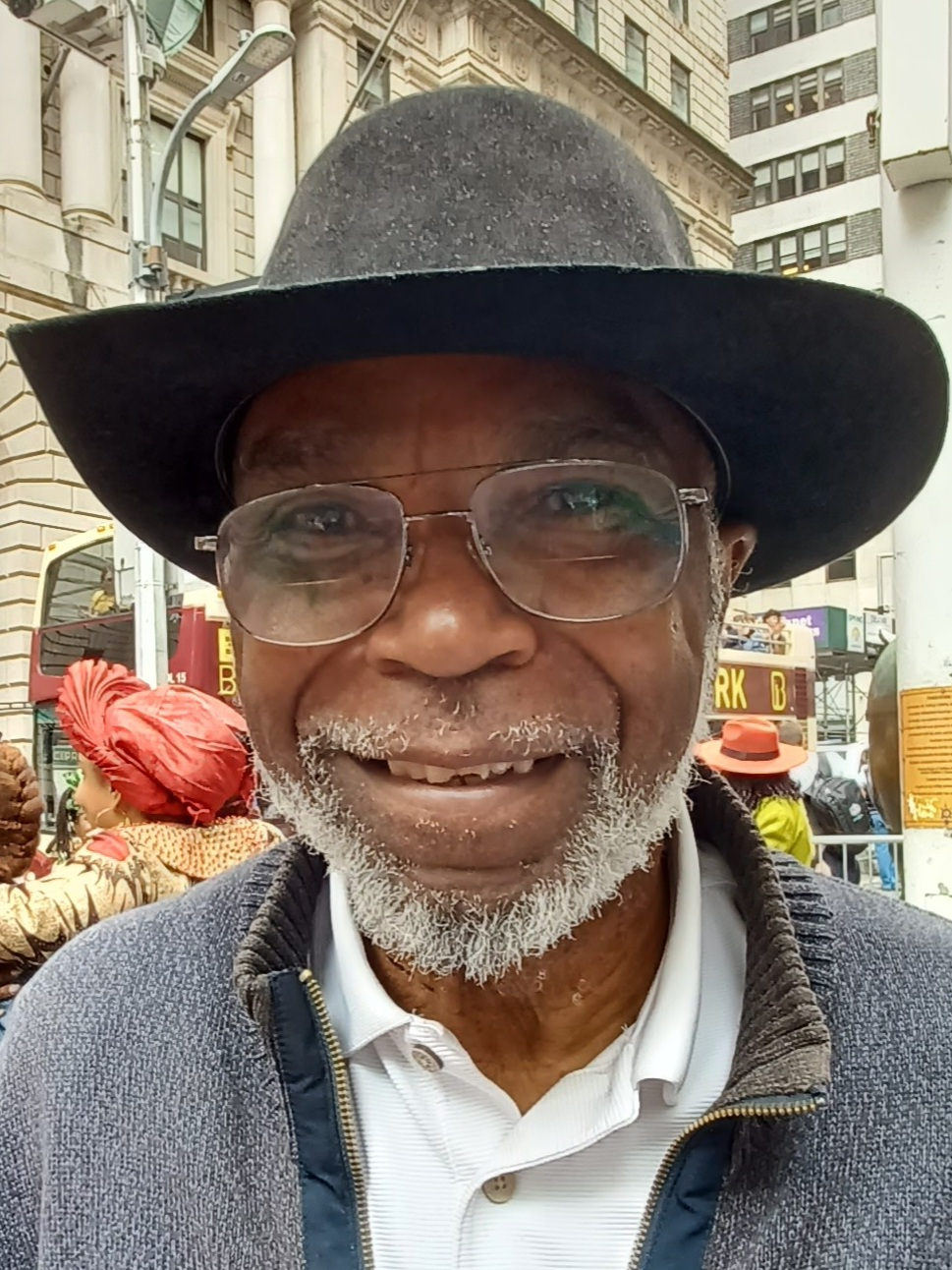
- Haith in 2023
- Born: Hassie Benjamin Haith Jr. 1942 (age 83–84); Connecticut
- Known for: Juneteenth flag

Hassie Benjamin Haith Jr. (born 1942), also known as Boston Ben, is an American activist, social worker, and designer of the Juneteenth flag. Haith has been active in anti-crime groups since the 1980s. He is also the founder of the National Juneteenth Celebration Foundation.

== Career ==
=== Activism ===
Haith is a grass roots community activist who publicly identifies and critiques racial disparity. He is active in anti-crime activities and he has been critical of law enforcement. Throughout his life he has advocated for investigations of the police.

In 1983, when he was 40 years old, he ran for public office for the first time. Haith ran for the District 7 city council seat, which represented a predominantly African American section of Boston. He described himself as a community activist who also owned an advertising agency with his wife. He ran his campaign out of a tent near Dudley Station Historic District. In 1986, he advocated for black areas of Boston to secede from the city.

In 2008 Haith and others camped out in the empty apartments located in the Lenox Street projects and Orchard Park in Roxbury. The goal of the action was to end the "Stop Snitching" culture by getting neighbors to "drop a dime" when they saw illegal activity.

==== Anti-LGBT controversy ====
In April 1985 Haith spoke out against a gay male couple who provided foster care for two young boys in Boston. Haith wanted publicity for his run for City Council, so he contacted the editors at the Boston Globe and complained that two boys were placed with a male couple in his neighborhood. Haith said that he was "completely opposed" to gay foster care because "it was a breakdown of the society and its values and morals." The publicity led Massachusetts governor Michael Dukakis to order the boys removed from the home the next day. The Associated Press picked up the story, and ultimately, the gay couple lost custody of the children.

=== Juneteenth ===
Haith founded the National Juneteenth Celebration Foundation, and he led the holiday's first Juneteenth flag-raising ceremony in Boston's Roxbury Heritage State Park in 2000. Haith designed the Juneteenth flag in 1997, and in 2000 (after the addition of the text June 19, 1865), he copyrighted the design.

== Electoral history ==
1983 Boston City Council 7th district election
Candidates	Preliminary election		General election	
Candidates	Votes	%	Votes	%
Bruce Bolling	7,556	59.1	9,049	63.9
Elizabeth "Betty" Jones	1,907	14.9	5,121	36.1
Ben Haith	1,315	10.3		
Roy A. Owens	1.146	9.0		
Steven A. Wise	567	4.4		
James Joseph	302	2.4		

1991 Boston City Council 7th district election
Candidates	Preliminary election		General election	
Candidates	Votes	%	Votes	%
Anthony Crayton	836	18.7	3,129	57.5
Roy A. Owens	974	21.8	2,314	42.5
Althea Garrison	703	15.7		
Ben Haith	691	15.4		
James A. West	666	14.9		
Hattie Dudley	395	8.8		
Natalie E. Carithers	211	4.7		
