= Negro Election Day =

American festival

Negro Election Day or Negroes Hallowday is a festival that began during 1741 in several towns of New England as part of the local selection of black representatives. The festival incorporated aspects of West African culture and ritualistic celebrations including traditional dancing, feasting, and parades. How the election process was conducted is unclear, and in its methods were often conducted vocally or by debate rather than a ballot system. A contest of strength or speed was involved.

African Americans were not allowed to vote until the Fifteenth Amendment was ratified in 1870. Election Day festivities held by their white counterparts did not appeal to the slave population who were prohibited from voting. In Puritan New England, the slave owners and freemen organized for the black communities to vote for an official that would act as an intermediary in white and black relations. They granted their slaves one day off to enjoy the festivities and to rejoice. This ran alongside the main white elections; in some cases, this official proved worthy and though not recognized federally, acted as a reputable liaison. In other cases the official was named the ‘king’ or ‘governor’ and served more as a parody of the newly elected white leader.

After the Civil War (1861–1865) the festival had lost its zeal amongst the black communities for reasons unknown, possibly spurred by the ratification of the Fifteenth Amendment in 1870.

== The first Black King in the United States ==
Two persons are the possible first Negro king in the United States. Between 1750 and 1850, researchers believe that at least 31 black kings and governors were elected. Most of the elected kings and governors were enslaved people and all were from New England. The first black king was an enslaved child of royalty, who was brought to New England and received the name Nero Brewster.

A freeman named Pompey Mansfield ("King Pompey") from West Africa won his freedom in 1762 and was elected king in his community multiple times.

== See also ==
- Emancipation Day
- Juneteenth
- National Freedom Day
