= Gordon Granger =

American military officer (1821–1876)

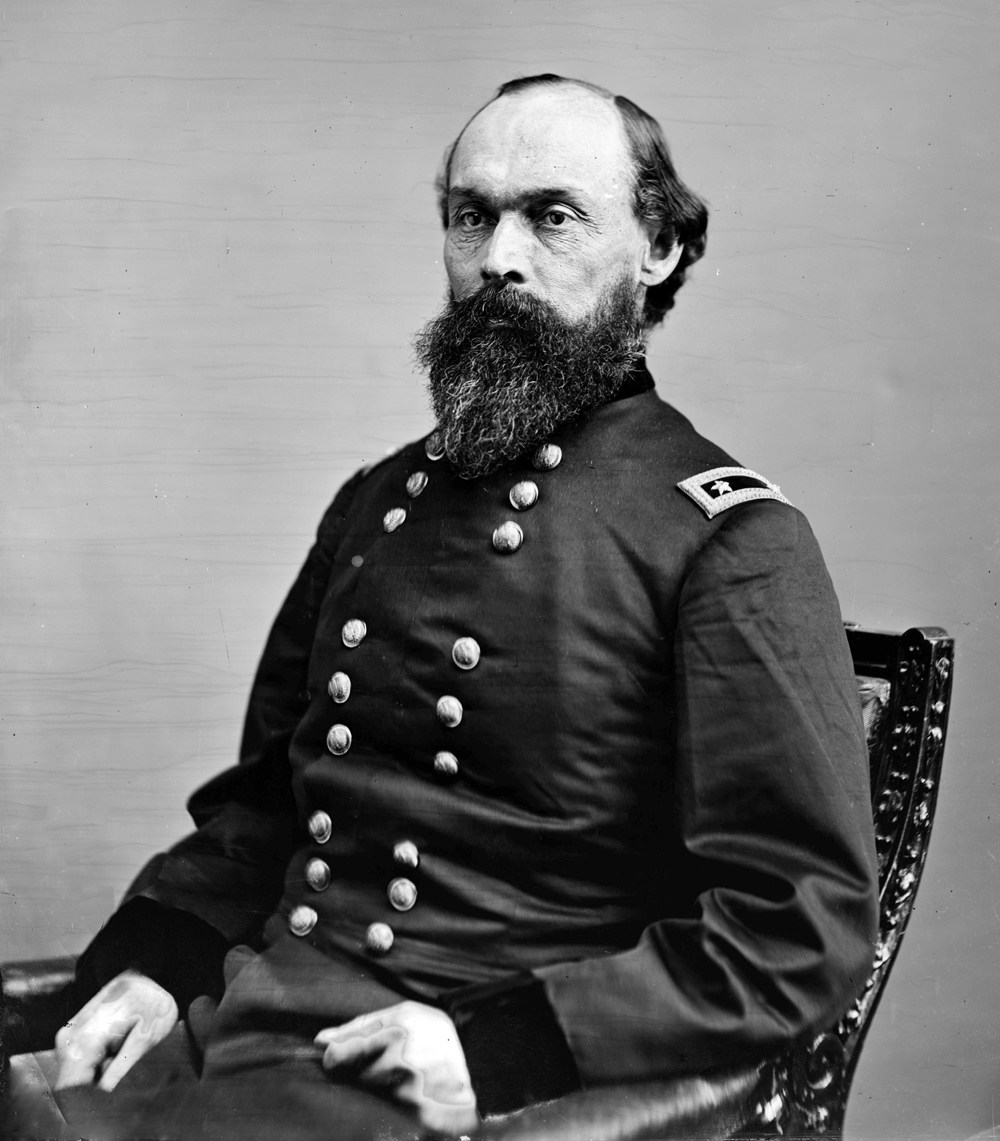
- Gordon Granger, photo taken during American Civil War
- Born: November 6, 1821; Joy, New York, US
- Died: January 10, 1876 (aged 54); Santa Fe, New Mexico, US
- Burial place: Lexington Cemetery, Lexington, Kentucky, US
- Military career
- Allegiance: United States
- Branch: United States Army (Union Army)
- Service years: 1845–1876
- Rank: Major general
- Commands: Army of Kentucky; IV Corps; XIII Corps; Department of Texas; District of New Mexico
- Conflicts: Mexican–American War; Battle of Contreras; Battle of Churubusco; Battle of Chapultepec; American Civil War; Battle of Wilson's Creek; Battle of New Madrid; Siege of Corinth; Battle of Chickamauga; Battle of Missionary Ridge; Battle of Mobile Bay; Battle of Fort Blakeley

Gordon Granger (November 6, 1821 – January 10, 1876) was a career U.S. Army officer, and a Union general during the American Civil War, where he distinguished himself at the Battle of Chickamauga.

Granger is best remembered for his part in the Battle of Chickamauga and the Battle of Chattanooga and for issuing General Order No. 3 on June 19, 1865, in Galveston, Texas, further informing residents of, and enforcing, Abraham Lincoln's Emancipation Proclamation which set all Confederate states' slaves free on January 1, 1863. Since 2021, June 19 has been commemorated by the federal holiday of Juneteenth.

== Early life ==
=== Pre-military life ===
Granger was born in Joy, Wayne County, New York, in 1821 to Gaius Granger and Catherine Taylor being one of three children in his family. His mother died on April 17, 1825, one month after giving birth to a daughter. His father married again in November 1826 to Sara (Salley) Emery and the two would have 10 children. He spent his early years with his paternal grandparents (Elihu and Apema or Apama Granger) in Phelps, New York. While attending high school he developed health issues which carried on throughout his life He was a teacher in North Rose, New York, prior to entering the United States Military Academy.

=== Early military career ===
Granger was appointed to the academy in 1841 when he was 19 years old. While there he met John Pope who later became one of his mentors. It is possible that his grudge with Ulysses S. Grant started when he was there with Grant holding the grudge more than Granger. He graduated from the United States Military Academy in 1845 placed thirty-fifth in a class of forty-one cadets. He was commissioned a brevet second lieutenant and assigned to the Second Infantry Regiment stationed in Detroit, Michigan. In July 1846 he transferred to the newly constituted Regiment of Mounted Riflemen at Jefferson Barracks, Missouri.

== Mexican–American War ==
During the Mexican–American War, Granger fought in Winfield Scott's army. He took part in the Siege of Veracruz, the Battle of Cerro Gordo, the Battle of Contreras, the Battle of Churubusco, and the Battle for Mexico City. Granger received two citations for gallantry and in May 1847 received his regular commission as a second lieutenant. After the war, he served on the western frontier in Oregon and then Texas. In 1853 he became a first lieutenant.

== Civil War ==
When the Civil War started, Granger was on sick leave. He was temporarily assigned to the staff of General George B. McClellan in Ohio. After recovering, he transferred back to the Regiment of Mounted Riflemen where he was promoted to captain in May 1861. As an adjutant of General Samuel D. Sturgis he saw action at the Battle of Dug Springs and observed the Union defeat at Wilson's Creek in August 1861 in Missouri, serving as a staff officer to General Nathaniel Lyon. Granger was cited for gallantry at Wilson's Creek, became a brevet major and was made a commander of the St. Louis Arsenal.

In November 1861, Granger assumed command of the 2nd Michigan Cavalry Regiment at Benton Barracks in St. Louis, becoming a colonel of volunteers. One of the Union veterans wrote in a memoir that Granger's "military genius soon asserted itself by many severe lessons to the volunteer officers and men of this regiment. He brought them up to the full standard of regulars within a period of three months," and "though a gruff appearing man, had succeeded in winning the respect of his regiment by his strict attention to all the details of making a well disciplined body of soldiers out of a mass of awkward men from every walk of life."

In February 1862, on the orders of General John Pope, the 2nd Michigan proceeded from St. Louis to Commerce, Missouri, where Pope assembled nearly 20,000 Union troops for an advance on New Madrid, Missouri. Granger assumed command over the Third Cavalry Brigade consisting of the 2nd and the 3rd Michigan cavalry regiments. After the 7th Illinois joined the brigade, it was reorganized into a cavalry division.

On March 26, 1862, Granger was promoted to brigadier general of volunteers and commanded the Cavalry Division, Army of the Mississippi during the Battle of New Madrid and the Siege of Corinth. He was promoted to major general of volunteers on September 17, 1862, and took command of the Army of Kentucky. He conducted cavalry operations in central Tennessee before his command was merged into the Army of the Cumberland, becoming the Reserve Corps.

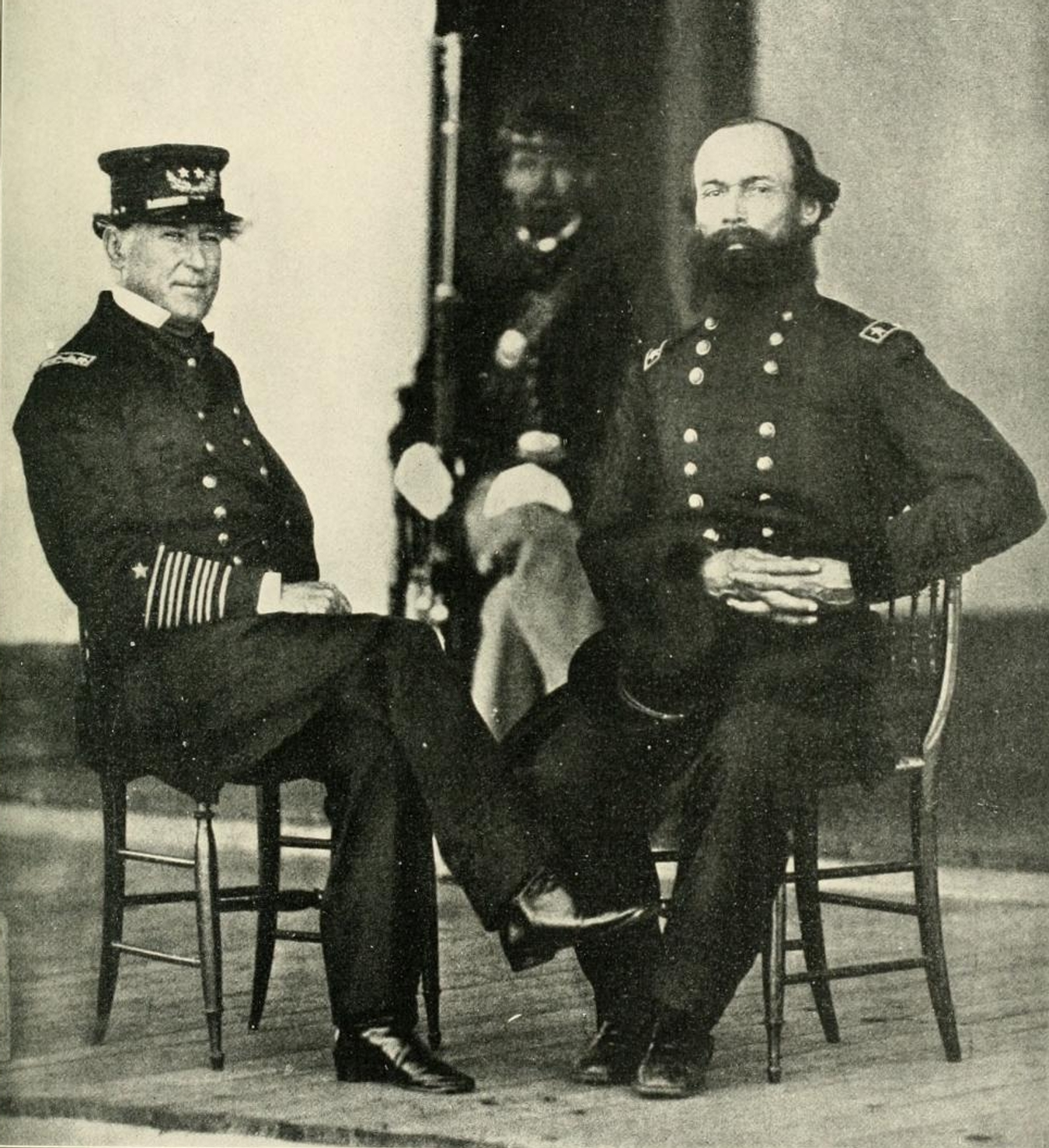
Admiral David Farragut and General Gordon Granger

Granger is most famous for his actions commanding the Reserve Corps at the Battle of Chickamauga. There on September 20, 1863, the second day of the battle, he reinforced, without orders, Major General George H. Thomas' XIV Corps on Snodgrass Hill by ordering James B. Steedman to send two brigades under his command to help Thomas. Asked by Thomas if he could counterattack a Confederate force on the Union flank, Granger replied, "My men are fresh and they are just the fellows for that work. They are raw troops and don't know any better than to charge up there." This action staved off the Confederate attackers until dark, permitting the Federal forces to retreat in good order and thus helping Thomas to earn the sobriquet "Rock of Chickamauga". After the battle, Granger wrote in his report, "being well convinced, judging from the sound of battle, that the enemy were pushing him [Thomas], and fearing that would not be able to resist their combined attack, I determined to go to his assistance at once."

Granger's effective leadership at Chickamauga earned him command of the newly formed IV Corps in the Army of the Cumberland commanded by General Thomas, and he was promoted brevet lieutenant colonel of the U.S. Army. Under his command, the IV Corps force distinguished itself at the third Battle of Chattanooga. Two of the IV Corps' divisions, those commanded by Thomas J. Wood and Philip Sheridan, were in the middle of the four divisions that assaulted the heavily manned center of the Confederate lines on Missionary Ridge. Although they had no further orders after taking the rifle-pits at the base, Granger's men kept going up the steep ridge, with the two other divisions just slightly behind, and routed the Confederates on the crest. This breakthrough, in conjunction with Hooker's successful assault further to the right, forced the Confederates, under General Braxton Bragg, to retreat in disorder. After Chattanooga, Granger took part in lifting the siege at Knoxville, Tennessee. Despite these successes, General Ulysses S. Grant disliked Granger as the latter resisted an appeal by General Phil Sheridan to pursue the retreating Confederate army after the battle and prevented him from gaining more prominent commands in the West or in the Eastern Theater of the American Civil War. General E. R. S. Canby later offered Granger a command in the Department of the Gulf over Grant's objections, and he led a division that provided land support to the naval operations conducted by Admiral David Farragut in the Gulf of Mexico. Granger led the land forces that captured Forts Gaines and Morgan in conjunction with the Union naval operations during the Battle of Mobile Bay. Granger commanded the XIII Corps during the Battle of Fort Blakeley, which led to the fall of the city of Mobile, Alabama.

== Postbellum ==
=== Time in Texas and Juneteenth ===
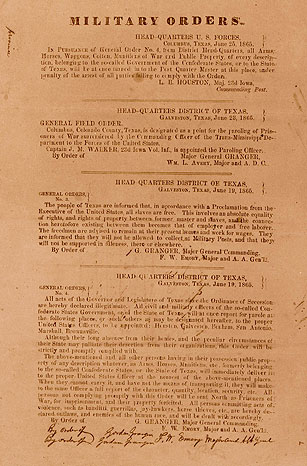
General Order No. 3, June 19, 1865

When the war ended, Granger was given command of the District of Texas on June 10, 1865. On June 19, 1865, in the city of Galveston, one of the first orders of business was to post Granger's General Order No. 3 which began with:

The people of Texas are informed that in accordance with a Proclamation from the Executive of the United States, all slaves are free. This involves an absolute equality of rights and rights of property between former masters and slaves, and the connection therefore existing between them becomes that between employer and hired laborer.

This set off joyous demonstrations by the freed people, originating the annual Juneteenth celebration, which commemorates the abolition of slavery in Texas.

Granger executed several other actions while being in command of Texas. He declared all laws passed by the Confederacy to be null, ensured all Confederate soldiers were paroled, anyone "having public property" which included cotton be given to the US Army and all cotton that was privately owned be given to the Army as compensation. He advised newly freed Blacks that they shouldn't congregate near towns and military posts without any employment and expecting welfare. Instead he suggested they should remain on their plantations to sign labor agreements with their former owners until the Freedmen's Bureau could be established. Granger would serve in his role until August 6, 1865, when he was replaced by General Horatio Wright.

=== Further career ===
When Granger was done serving in Texas he commanded the Department of Kentucky from August 12, 1865, to January 15, 1866. After the Civil War, he continued his relationship with President Andrew Johnson which he had established when Johnson was Tennessee's military governor. Because of Granger's ties to Johnson, a Democrat, Grant thought that Granger was getting "out of tedious routine duties" by getting favors from Johnson. President Johnson did send him on assignments. His ties with Johnson led to his further alienation from Grant who was becoming aligned with the Radical Republicans. Granger and George Armstrong Custer joined once in September 1866 to organize a "soldiers' convention" in Cleveland to help Johnson's administration.

Granger was elected a First Class Companion of the New York Commandery of the Military Order of the Loyal Legion of the United States on May 2, 1866, a prestigious military society for officers of the Union Army and their descendants.

Granger remained in the Army after mustering out of the volunteer service. In July 1866, he was assigned as a colonel to the reconstituted 25th Infantry Regiment. While there, he stayed on a leave of absence and spent a good portion of his time in New York City lobbying President Johnson for potential appointments. He reported back for duty on September 1, 1867.

He was reassigned as colonel of the 15th Infantry Regiment, December 15, 1870 and commanded the District of New Mexico, from April 29, 1871, to June 1, 1873. Cochise who was the leader of the Chiricahuan tribe and his people went to New Mexico where he contacted Granger to discuss peace terms, which the two did in March 1872 at Cañada Alamosa. However, peace did not come out of this as the Chiricahuas ended up going to the Dragoon Mountains when learning that all Apaches were going to be sent to Fort Tularosa. Peace was reached when Brigadier General Oliver O. Howard met him in October that year.

Granger went on sick leave of absence to October 31, 1875; and then was again in command of the District of New Mexico, October 31, 1875, to January 10, 1876.

Granger died in Santa Fe, New Mexico on January 10, 1876, where he was serving in command of the District of New Mexico. He is buried in Lexington Cemetery in Kentucky.

== Dates of rank ==
Insignia	Rank	Date	Component
	Brevet Second Lieutenant	July 1, 1845	2nd Infantry
	Brevet Second Lieutenant	July 17, 1846	Mounted Rifles
	Second Lieutenant	May 29, 1847	Mounted Rifles
	Brevet First Lieutenant	August 20, 1847	Regular Army
	Brevet Captain	September 13, 1847	Regular Army
	First Lieutenant	May 24, 1852	Mounted Rifles
	Captain	May 5, 1861	Mounted Rifles
	Brevet Major	August 10, 1861	Regular Army
	Colonel	September 2, 1861	2nd Michigan Cavalry
	Brigadier General	March 26, 1862	Volunteers
	Major General	September 17, 1862	Volunteers
	Brevet Lieutenant Colonel	September 20, 1863	Regular Army
	Brevet Colonel	November 20, 1863	Regular Army
	Brevet Brigadier General	March 13, 1865	Regular Army
	Brevet Major General	March 13, 1865	Regular Army
	Colonel	July 28, 1866	25th Infantry
	Colonel	December 20, 1870	15th Infantry

== See also ==
- List of American Civil War generals (Union)

Military offices
Preceded by none	Commander of the IV Corps; October 10, 1863 – April 10, 1864	Succeeded by Oliver O. Howard
