= John Eliot Square District =

Historic district in Massachusetts, United States

- U.S. National Register of Historic Places
- U.S. Historic district
- U.S. Historic district – Contributing property
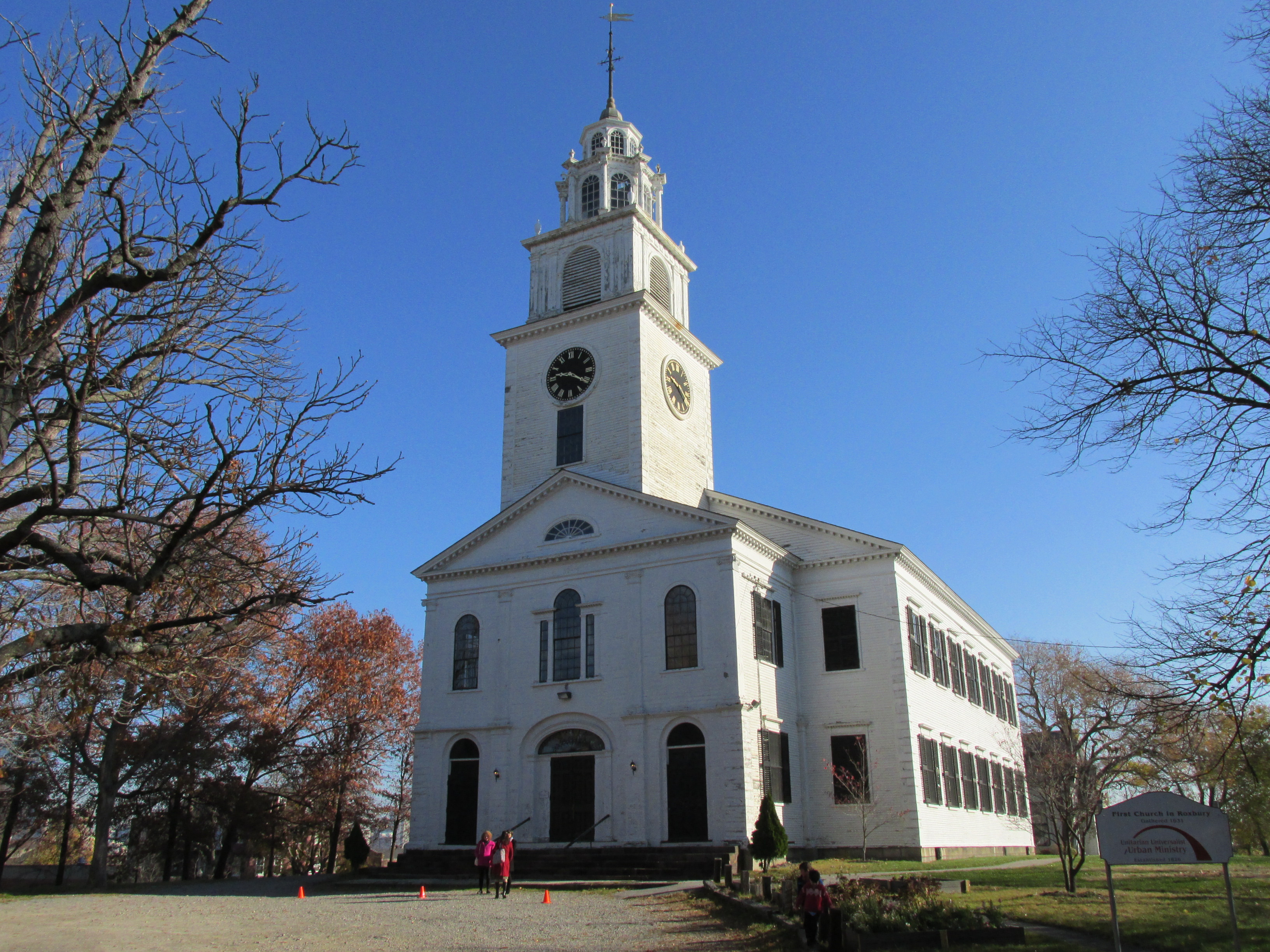
- First Church of Roxbury

- Location within Massachusetts Location within the United States
- Location: Boston, Massachusetts
- Coordinates: 42°19′47″N 71°5′27″W
- Architect: Multiple
- Architectural style: Mid 19th Century Revival, Late Victorian, Federal
- Part of: Roxbury Highlands Historic District (ID89000147)
- NRHP reference No.: 73000854

Significant dates
- Added to NRHP: April 23, 1973
- Designated CP: February 22, 1989

John Eliot Square District is a historic district located in the northern Roxbury neighborhood of Boston, Massachusetts. It is formed by the intersection of Dudley, Bartlett, Centre, Roxbury and Highland Streets. Named after local missionary to the Indians, John Eliot, the square was the site of the Roxbury town center after its founding in 1630. Roxbury was annexed to Boston in 1868, and John Eliot Square was added to the National Register of Historic Places in 1973. The square is the nucleus of Roxbury Heritage State Park, a history-themed heritage park.

== Major landmarks ==
=== First Church of Roxbury ===
John Eliot Square's central landmark is the First Church of Roxbury, Boston's oldest surviving wooden meeting house from the Federal Period of American architecture.

=== Dillaway-Thomas House ===
Roxbury Heritage State Park is anchored by the Dillaway–Thomas House, a large colonial structure built in 1750 and thought to be Roxbury's oldest surviving house. The location includes an adjacent 1-acre (0.40 ha) landscaped park with views of the Boston skyline, and is part of the Metropolitan Park System of Greater Boston.

The Georgian-style home was built as a parsonage for Rev. Oliver Peabody, pastor of the First Church of Roxbury in 1750. The house was later owned by Martha Dillaway and then John Thomas, an American commander in the Continental Army during the American Revolutionary War. While Thomas owned the house in 1776, cannons from Fort Ticonderoga in New York were transported by Henry Knox to Cambridge, Massachusetts and then through Roxbury on the way to forming the Fortification of Dorchester Heights, where they were used to force the evacuation of the British from Boston on March 17. A marker commemorating the neighborhood as a stop on the Knox trail and signifying Thomas' role in ending the Siege of Boston was placed at the park in 2009. The marker was the 57th placed to commemorate the Knox Expedition, and the first added since the string of monuments marking the trail was established in 1927.

The house was first restored in the 1930s by a preservationist who also introduced some inaccurate fixtures in an effort to embellish its history. After two fires in the 1970s, a state representative who was a former Roxbury resident successfully petitioned the legislature in 1984 for funding to restore the house and preserve it as a heritage park. The following restoration was done leaving some spots showing levels of all previous work done to the house left exposed, creating a physical timeline of the architectural history of the house. The completed house was opened to the public in 1992, and contains exhibits tracing periods of the history of Roxbury from the past to the present.

== See also ==
- National Register of Historic Places listings in southern Boston, Massachusetts
