= General Order No. 3 =

News of the Emancipation Proclamation in Texas (1865)

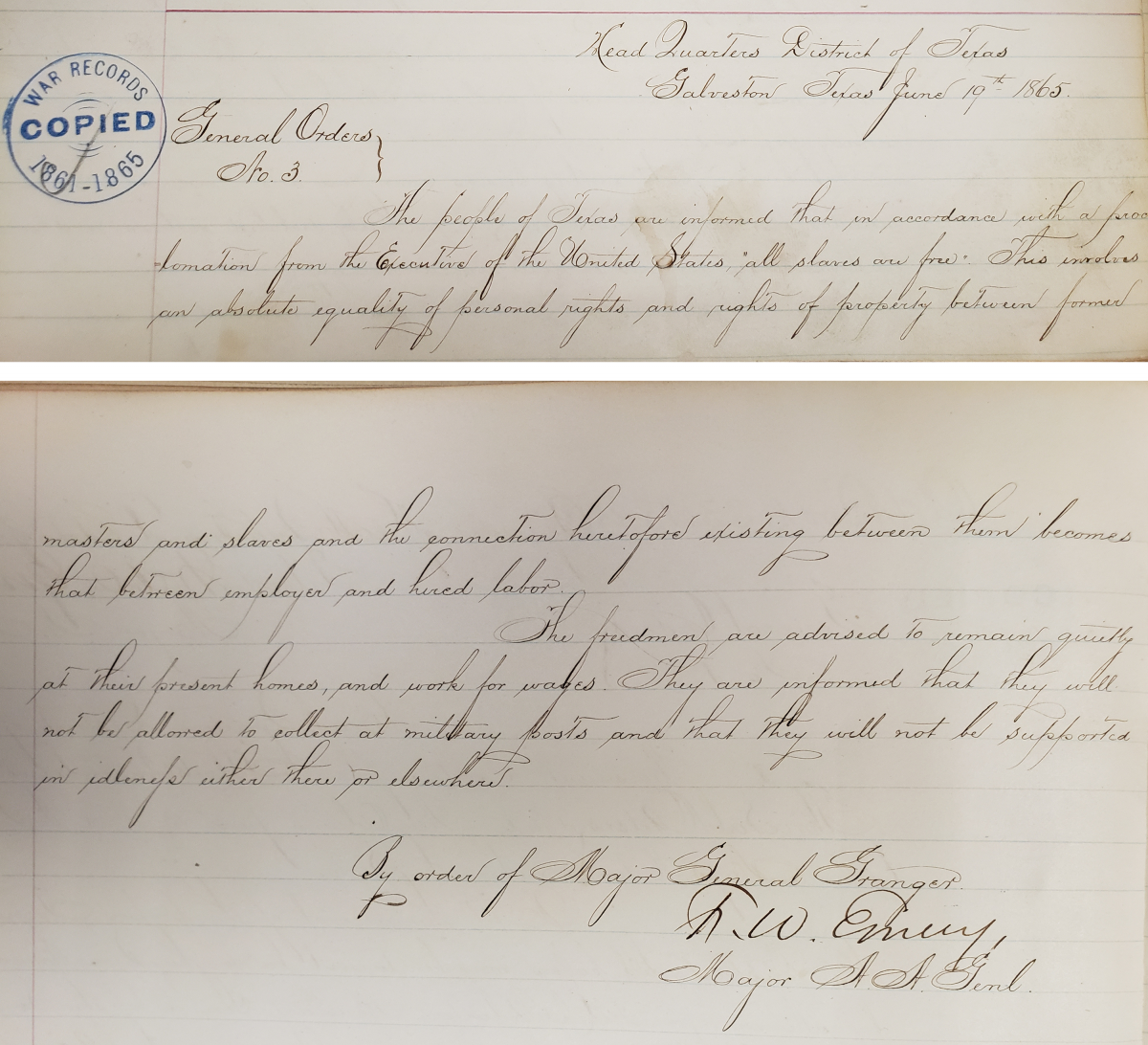
Original handwritten record of General Order No. 3 held in the National Archives

General Order No. 3 was an American legal decree issued in 1865 enforcing the Emancipation Proclamation to the residents of the U.S. state of Texas and freeing all remaining enslaved people in the state. The general order was issued by Union general Gordon Granger on June 19, 1865, upon arriving at Galveston, Texas, at the end of the American Civil War and two and a half years after the original issuance of the Emancipation Proclamation. The order, and Granger's enforcement of it, is the central event commemorated by the holiday of Juneteenth, which originally celebrated the end of slavery in Texas.

The order was not read aloud by the Union Army, but it was posted around town, and communicated to most African Americans by slavemasters. News of the Emancipation Proclamation had reached Texas and been covered in Texas newspapers, but due to the lack of Union military presence, it had not been enforced.

== Physical document ==
=== Official record ===
While several contemporary printed versions of the order have long been known, the original handwritten official record was digitized and publicized by the National Archives and Records Administration on June 18, 2020. The document is physically located in the National Archives Building in Washington, D.C., and is maintained by the Textual Records Division. The text was recorded by the Assistant Adjutant General, Major Frederick W. Emery in a bound record book of general orders issued by the Army. It is cataloged as part of the National Archives' collection "Record Group 393: Records of U.S. Army Continental Commands".

=== Text ===
The following is the text of the official recorded version of the order:

Head Quarters District of Texas

Galveston Texas June 19th 1865.

General Orders

No. 3.

The people of Texas are informed that, in accordance with a proclamation from the Executive of the United States, all slaves are free. This involves an absolute equality of personal rights and rights of property between former masters and slaves, and the connection heretofore existing between them becomes that between employer and hired labor.

The freedmen are advised to remain quietly at their present homes and work for wages. They are informed that they will not be allowed to collect at military posts and that they will not be supported in idleness either there or elsewhere.

By order of Major General Granger

F.W. Emery

Major A.A. Genl.

=== Printed versions ===
The text of the order was circulated and reprinted in many contemporary newspapers and other sources which have been preserved. One of the earliest was the Galveston Tri-Weekly News, which printed General Order No. 3 on June 20, 1865, the day after it was issued. On July 7, 1865, The New York Times printed a copy of General Order No. 3 among a series of other recent general orders issued by Granger, which it described as "interesting news from Texas" under the headline "The Slaves All Free."

== Misconceptions ==
A common misconception holds that the Emancipation Proclamation freed all slaves in the United States, or that the General Order No. 3 on June 19, 1865, marked the end of slavery in the United States. In fact, the Thirteenth Amendment, ratified and proclaimed in December 1865, was the article that made slavery illegal in the United States nationwide ("except as a punishment for crime whereof the party shall have been duly convicted"), not the Emancipation Proclamation.

Another common misconception is that it took over two years for news of the Emancipation Proclamation to reach Texas, and that slaves did not know they had already been freed by it. In fact, news of the Proclamation had reached Texas long before 1865, and many slaves knew about Lincoln's order emancipating them, but they had not been freed since the Union army had yet to reach Texas to enforce the Proclamation. Only after the arrival of the Union army and General Order No. 3 was the Proclamation widely enforced in Texas.
