= Roxbury Heritage State Park =

Massachusetts state park

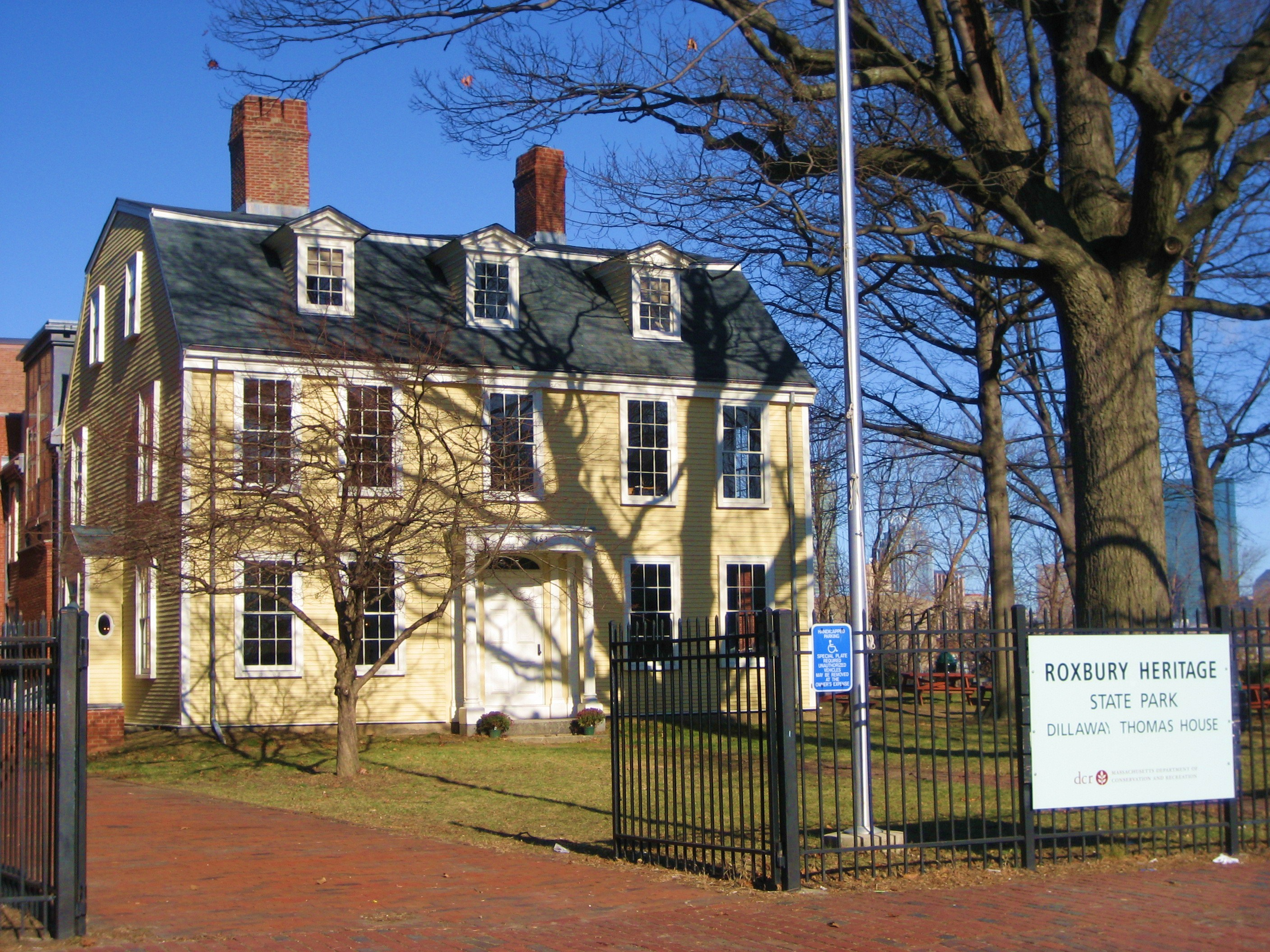
- Dillaway-Thomas House
- Interactive map of Roxbury Heritage State Park
- Location: 183 Roxbury Street, Boston, Suffolk County, Massachusetts, United States
- Coordinates: 42°19′49″N 71°5′26″W
- Area: 3 acres (1.2 ha)
- Established: 1992
- Operator: Massachusetts Department of Conservation and Recreation
- Website: Roxbury Heritage State Park

Roxbury Heritage State Park is a history-themed heritage park in the oldest part of Roxbury, a former town annexed in 1868 by Boston, Massachusetts. It is anchored by the Dillaway–Thomas House, a large colonial structure built in 1750 and thought to be the oldest surviving house in Roxbury. The location includes an adjacent 1-acre (0.40 ha) landscaped park with views of the Boston skyline, and is part of the Metropolitan Park System of Greater Boston.

== History ==
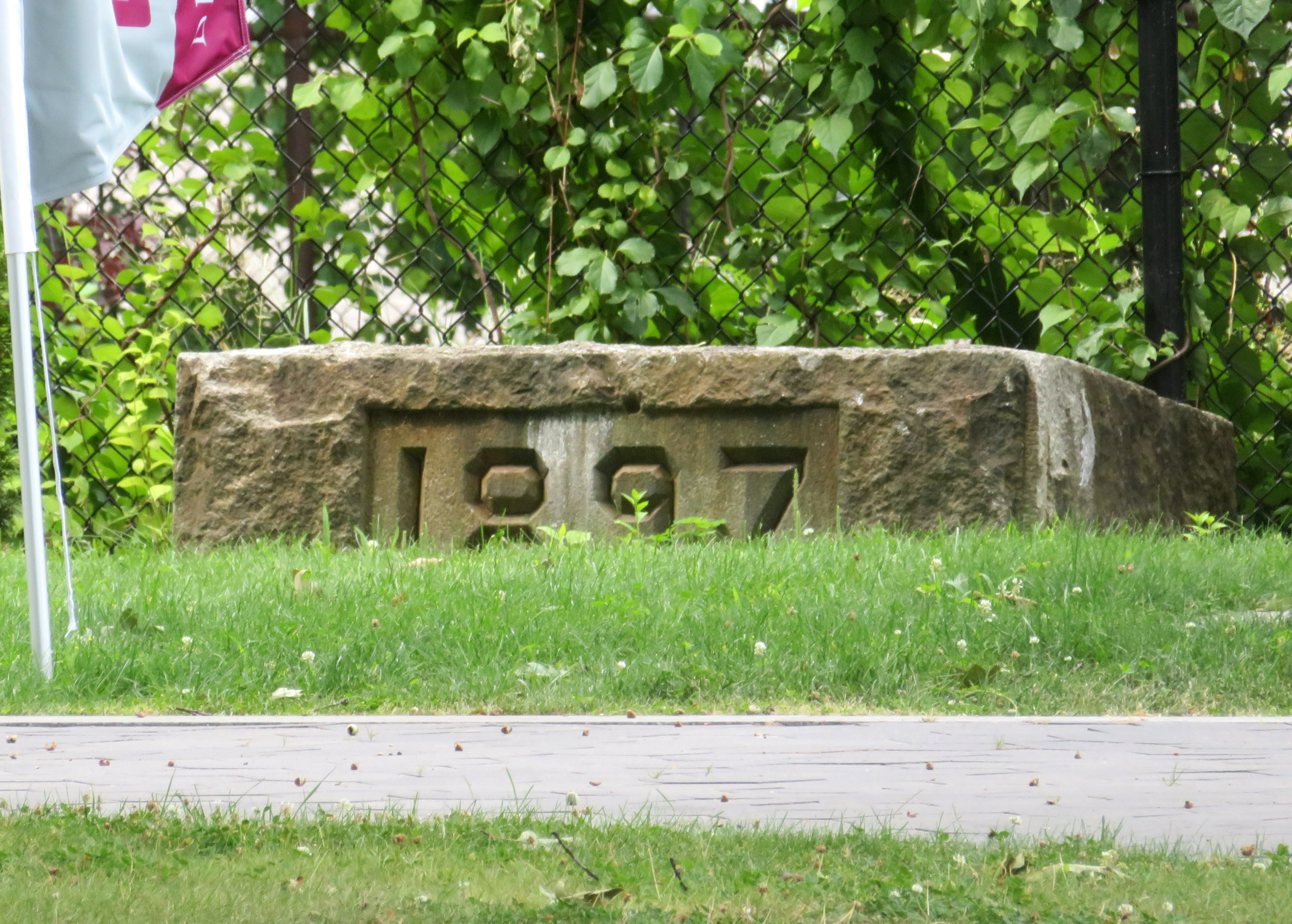
1897 foundation stone of the Southwest Corridor viaduct, on display in the park

The heritage park is located in the John Eliot Square area of northern Roxbury, which was the site of the town center after its founding in 1630.

Rev. Oliver Peabody, pastor of the First Church in Roxbury, began construction of a Georgian-style parsonage in 1750. However, he died before it was completed and Rev. Amos Adams, his successor, finished it for his own use in 1752. In 1775, the house, which afforded excellent views of Dorchester Heights and Boston Neck, was requisitioned by John Thomas, then a brigadier general in the Continental Army, for use as military headquarters.

In 1776, while Thomas was in residence, cannons from Fort Ticonderoga in northern New York were transported by Henry Knox to Cambridge, Massachusetts and then through Roxbury to fortify Dorchester Heights, where they were used to force the evacuation of the British from Boston on March 17. A marker commemorating the neighborhood as a stop on the Henry Knox Trail and signifying Thomas's role in ending the Siege of Boston was placed at the park in 2009. The marker was the fifty-seventh placed to commemorate the Knox Expedition, and the first added since the string of monuments marking the trail was established in 1927.

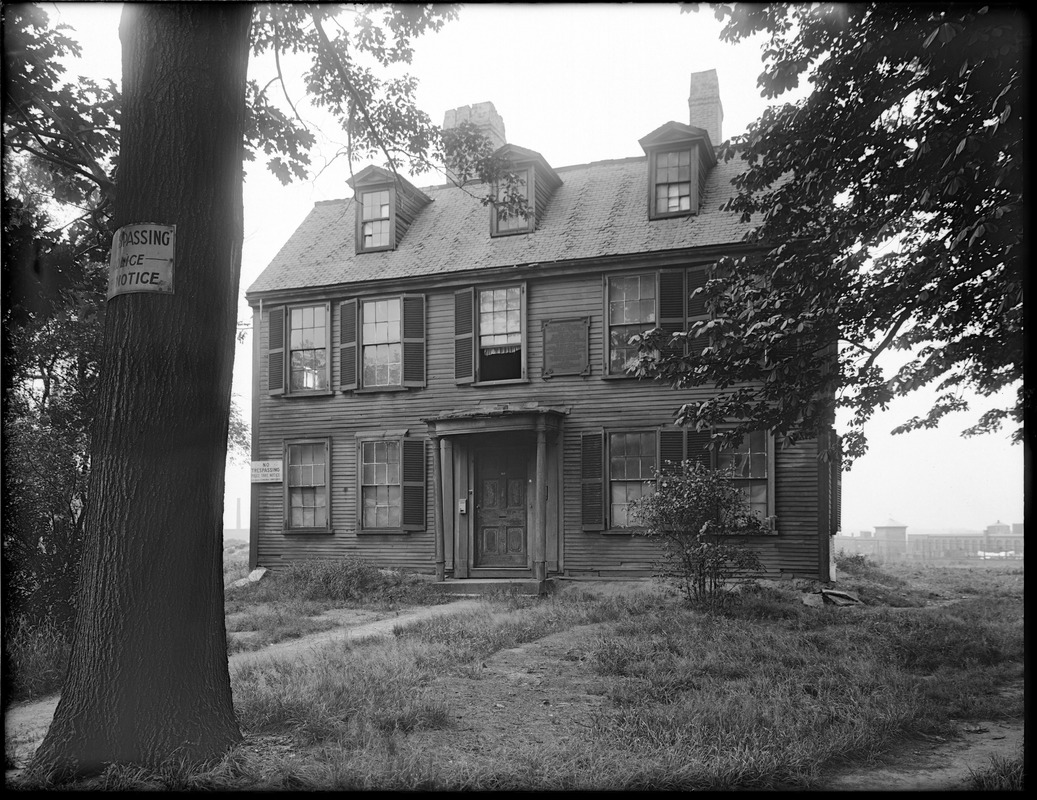
Dillaway Thomas House, July 1930

In 1786 the house was returned to its original function as a parsonage when Rev. Eliphalet Porter acquired it. Porter left the house to his nieces Martha and Caroline Porter and in 1835 Martha and her husband Charles Knapp Dillaway moved in. Dillaway was headmaster of the Boston Latin School from 1831 to 1836, when he retired because of ill health. He continued to teach privately. Dillaway died in 1889; Martha continued to live in the house until her death in 1903.

The property was purchased by the City of Boston in 1927. Initial plans to demolish it and replace it with a school were fought successfully by the community. The house was restored under the guidance of the Roxbury Historical Society and was dedicated on December 24, 1933.

After two fires in the 1970s, then–state Representative Byron Rushing, a former Roxbury resident, successfully petitioned the legislature in 1984 for funding to restore the house and preserve it as a heritage park. According to Robert Olson, who conducted the project, architect Frank Chouteau Brown added Colonial details in the 1932 restoration that were never present in the house; for example, rough plank doors with wrought-iron hinges of a design he simply invented and a chair rail where none had existed. This restoration left some spots showing levels of all previous work done to the house exposed, creating a physical timeline of the architectural history of the house. The completed house was opened to the public in 1992, and contains exhibits tracing periods of the history of Roxbury from the past to the present.

A third round of restoration earned a 2020 Preservation Award from the Boston Preservation Alliance.

== Resources ==
- Drake, Francis S. (October 1878). The town of Roxbury: its memorable persons and places, its history and antiquities, with numerous illustrations of its old landmarks and noted personages. Roxbury: Published by the Author.
