= Mayoralty of Raymond Flynn =

1984–1993 mayoralty in Boston, US

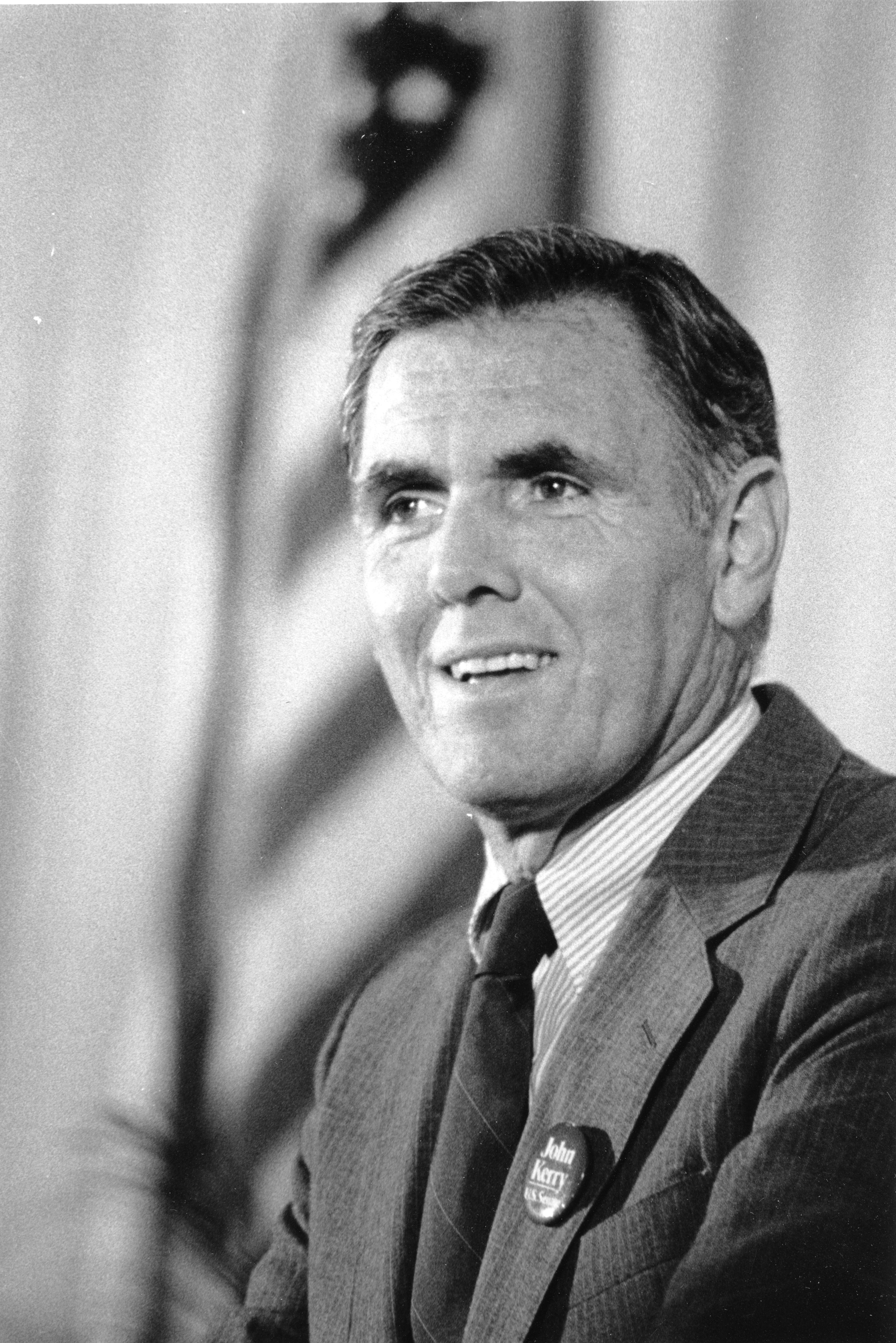
- Mayoralty of Raymond Flynn; January 2, 1984 – July 12, 1993
- Mayor: Raymond Flynn
- Party: Democratic
- Election: 1983, 1987, 1991

Raymond Flynn served as the Mayor of Boston from January 1984 to July 1993. He was elected mayor in 1983 and took office in January 1984. He was re-elected in 1987 and 1991. Polls showed Flynn to enjoy strong approval from Bostonians during his mayoralty. As mayor, Flynn balanced the city's budget, eliminating a large budget deficit. To address the deficit, Flynn lobbied heavily for the passage of a revenue package for the city in the Massachusetts Legislature to provide additional state aid to the city and the authorization for the city to raise new local taxes. In 1985, a revenue package was passed and signed into law by Governor Dukakis. In response to discriminatory practices studies found banks to be practicing in Boston, Flynn took actions which persuaded banks to reach a $400 million community reinvestment agreement with the city. Flynn succeeded in getting legislation passed to replace the city's publicly elected school board with the new Boston School Committee, members of which are appointed by the city's mayor. Flynn would quickly come to express his regret about this change. In 1990, Flynn saw strong criticism from Black leaders over the Boston Police Department's handling of the investigation into the murder of Carol Stuart. As mayor, Flynn advanced plans to desegregate the city's public housing, and made efforts to heal the city's racial divides. Flynn's mayoral administration granted neighborhood groups more of a voice in the use of the city's development and planning authorities in their neighborhoods. This included innovative move of granting the Dudley Street Neighborhood Initiative powers of eminent domain. Flynn successfully fought to enact rent control laws and strong tenants' rights laws. Flynn also served as president of the United States Conference of Mayors from 1991 to 1992.

Flynn resigned as mayor in 1993 in order to accept an appointment by President Bill Clinton as United States Ambassador to the Holy See.

== Elections ==
=== 1983 ===
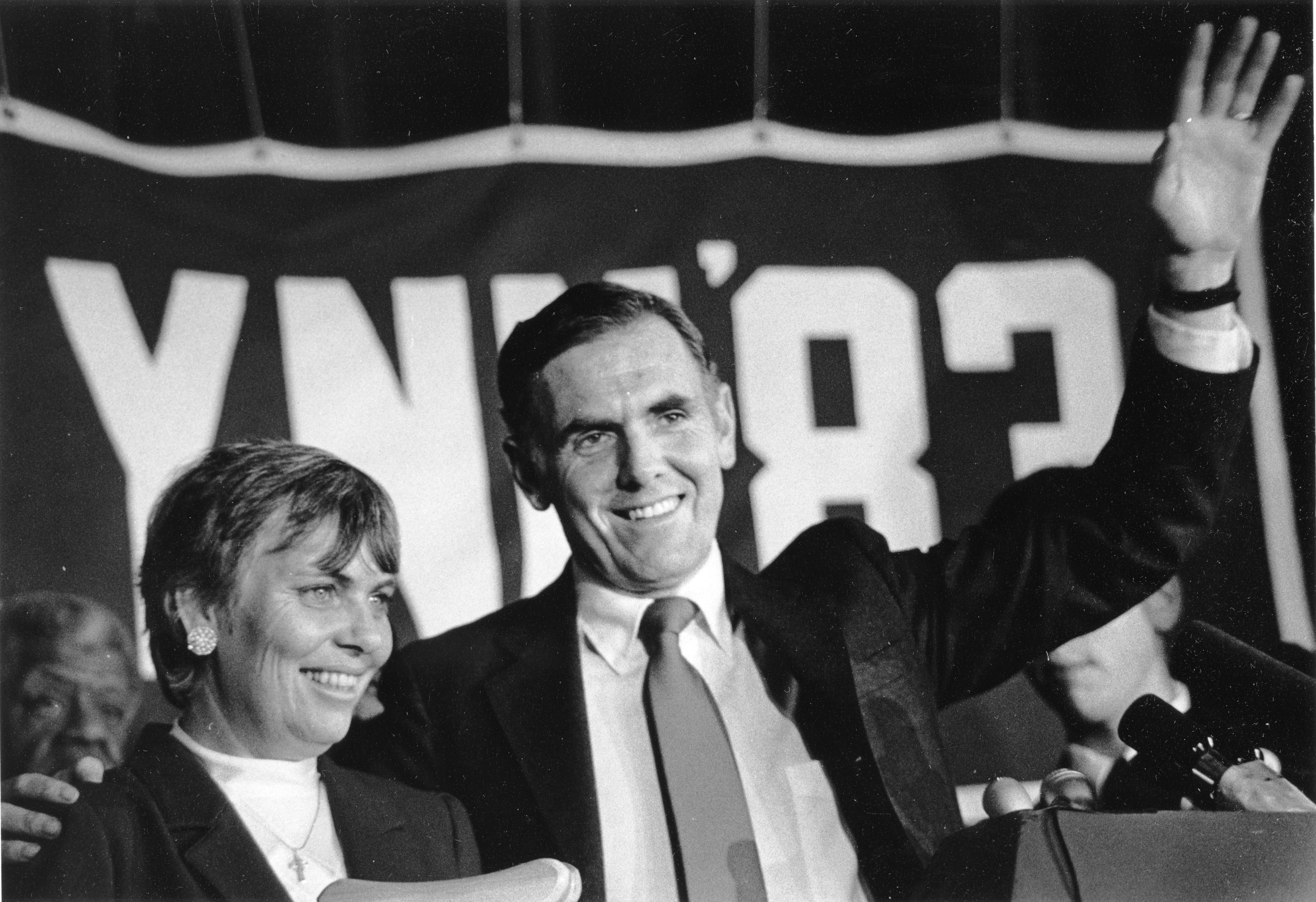
Flynn, with his wife Kathy, at his 1983 election night celebration

In April 1983, Flynn announced his candidacy for mayor of Boston. In the October nonpartisan primary election, Flynn and State Representative Mel King placed atop the results, advancing to the general election. King was the first African American to be a candidate in a Boston mayoral general election. Both Flynn and King had originally been viewed as underdogs in the primary election. Flynn defeated King in the general election. Flynn and King had known each other since childhood, meeting through both playing basketball, and had both served as state representatives at the same time and worked together there on legislation. They would ultimately have a lifelong friendship, despite having run against each other for mayor.

Flynn's campaign received no significant financial support from major sectors of the city's business community. Flynn outright refused to accept campaign donations from developers with projects pending before city agencies, or lawyers of such developers. Both the Flynn and King campaigns had low expenditures compared to the nearly $2 million campaign that outgoing mayor Kevin White and the political machine supporting him had spent on his candidacies in the 1975 and 1979 mayoral elections. Flynn's campaign spent roughly $400,000, while King's spent less than $350,000.

Dudley Clendinen wrote that Flynn had worked to establish himself as a champion of the poor and elderly and to appeal across ethnic lines to ethnic minority voters. While Flynn had earlier in his political career opposed gay rights issues, by the time of his mayoral campaign he was making an active effort to court the gay vote. At the time, gay communities across the United States were becoming more politically organized.

==== Primary election ====
Flynn first announced his candidacy in front of a public housing project, pledging that he would be a "people's mayor". He was viewed as an underdog at the start of his campaign, due to a lack of funding, a political organization, or connections to the business or media establishments.

Flynn and King had both shaped the narrative of the debate during the hotly-contested primary, successfully creating a "downtown versus the neighborhoods" narrative, with Flynn and King taking the side of being in support of the city's neighborhoods. A major item of debate was linkage, a fee that would be placed on downtown developers to raise funds for affordable housing. Flynn and King placed in the primary above candidates who were perceived as more representative of "downtown" interests. Coinciding with the primary, voters also strongly approved non-binding referendums in favor of a linkage policy and the creation of neighborhood councils. Both referendums had been supported by the group Massachusetts Fair Share. Flynn and King were the only two candidates who supported imposing linkage fees.

During the primary, the city's progressive activists were largely sharply divided between Flynn and King's candidacies. Flynn benefited from grassroots support.

==== General election ====
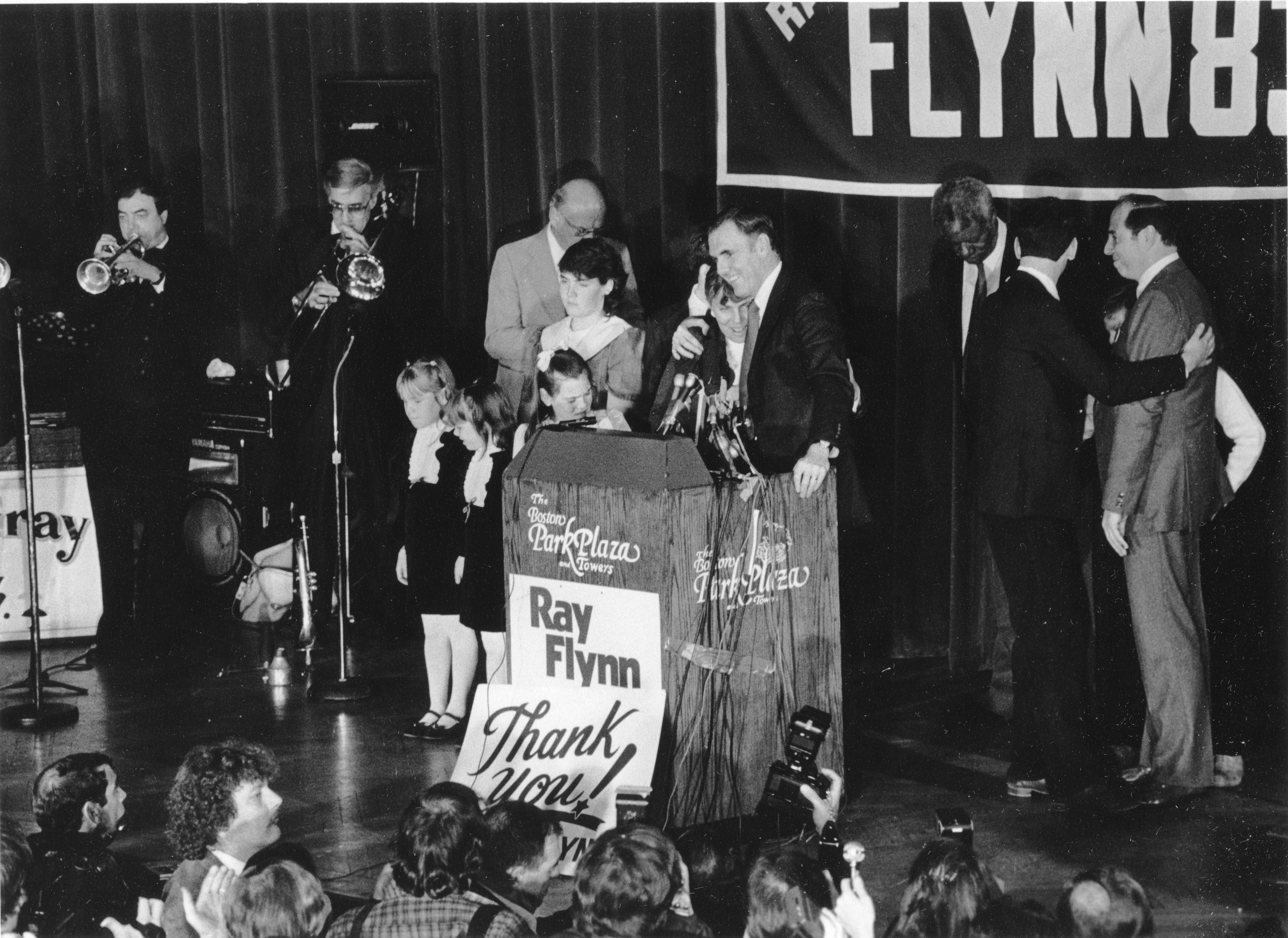
Flynn delivering his victory speech, joined on stage by his family and others

In the general election, Flynn received the political endorsement of The Boston Globe's editorial board. Among the groups endorsing Flynn were low-income tenant organizations, elderly organizations, and a number of labor unions.

In the election, both Flynn and King worked to build progressive coalitions, and both pledged to dedicate themselves to working across ethnic divides in the city. In the five weeks leading up to the general election, the two candidates held more than fifty local neighborhood debates.

The campaign was peaceful, and only a handful of isolated racial violence incidents occurred during it.

After his election, his mayoral transition effort was headed by John F. Bok.

=== Re-elections in 1987 and 1991 ===
Flynn was reelected mayor in 1987 and 1991, winning more than two-thirds of the vote each time. In his reelections, he won a higher vote share in Black and Hispanic areas of the city than he did in White areas. In 1987, Flynn carried every ward of the city except for in his native South Boston. His failure to carry South Boston was perhaps due to his promise weeks before the election to desegregate all-white Boston Housing Authority developments in South Boston. Flynn's 1991 campaign for a third term came despite a 1981 campaign promise to only serve two terms. In his 1991 campaign, he ran a low-profile campaign that he touted as being "grassroots", and ran no television or radio advertisements. He centered his candidacy on ties to the city's neighborhoods and his successes in balancing the city's budget.

== Reputation and political ideology ==
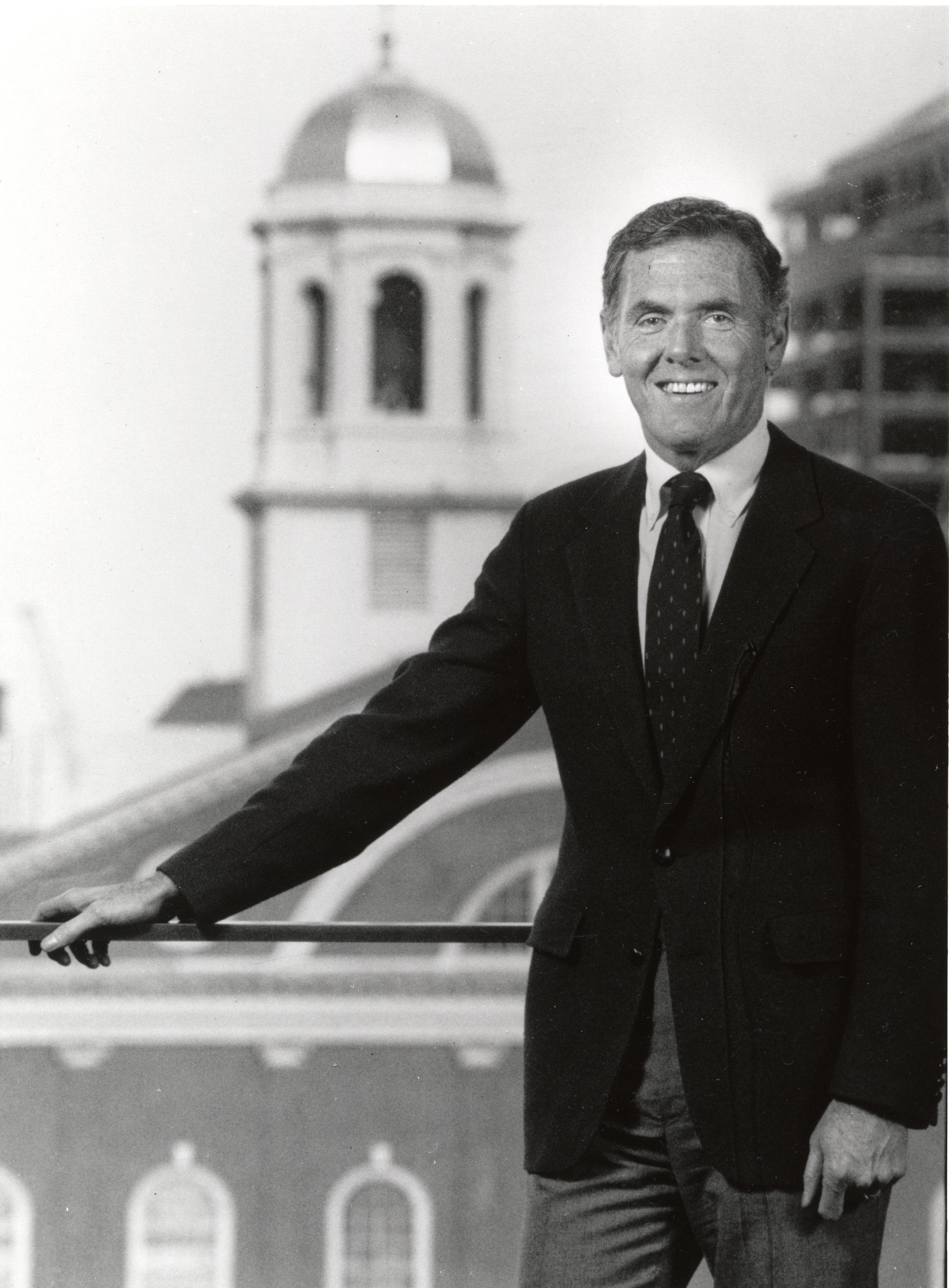
Flynn as mayor, in his office at Boston City Hall with Faneuil Hall visible behind him (circa 1984–1987)

Flynn served as mayor from his inauguration on January 2, 1984 until his resignation on July 12, 1993. During his tenure, Flynn was regarded to be a popular mayor, which was reflected in high approval ratings. In 1992, Fox Butterfield of The New York Times called Flynn "one of the most popular mayors in [Boston]'s history". As mayor, Flynn maintained a prominent public profile. In 1984, journalist Colman McCarthy described Flynn as having a "blazonry of political zeal that makes him one of the nation's most attractive Democrats."

At the time of his first re-election in 1987, Flynn had attained an image of being un-corrupt, with political consultant Michael Goldman remarking at the time, "The most important thing Flynn has done is to have been someone who could govern without corruption. Even those who are not satisfied with Flynn feel he has been honest." Goldman also noted that Flynn had also maintained an image of being a populist well-connected to the city's blue-collar workers. In 1998, Jack W. Germond and Jules Witcover of The Baltimore Sun wrote that, as mayor, Flynn had, "built a national reputation as an advocate for the homeless and a local reputation as a hands-on politician who showed up at every fire or police emergency."

At the time that Flynn was preparing to leave office, in an article published in The Christian Science Monitor, George B. Merry described Flynn as a mayor whose "hands-on" approach had made him, "one of the most visible mayors in Boston history." He considered Flynn's leadership to have delivered mixed results. Merry described Flynn's leadership-style as being heavily focused on neighborhood-level quality of life issues, writing,

NO Boston mayor in the past half-century has been more neighborhood-oriented than Raymond Flynn. In his 9-1/2 years at City Hall he has directed his attention and the city's resources toward improving life for its citizens. Unlike predecessors John Hynes, John Collins, and Kevin White, who concentrated on changing the physical face of Boston with new buildings, Mayor Flynn has focused on improving municipal services and on people things like street lighting and playgrounds.

Flynn was regarded to be an "economic liberal" and "cultural conservative". Elected mayor on a populist platform, Flynn supported wealth redistribution. Flynn opposed abortion. Despite having opposed gun control policies in his early political career as mayor Flynn supported them. While he opposed gay rights issues in his early political career, by the time of his first mayoral campaign made an active effort to ingratiate himself to the gay community. He, however, opposed same-sex marriage, Flynn opposed decreases initiated during the Reagan presidency to federal revenue sharing with cities.

== Economic matters ==
The state of the city's economy is regarded to have greatly rebounded over the course of Flynn's mayoralty. Additionally, Flynn is regarded to have significantly improved the fiscal health of the city government.

=== Community reinvestment agreement with banks ===
In 1989, two studies, including one by the Boston Redevelopment Authority, found the city's major banks to be discriminating in practices regarding mortgage lending, personnel hiring, and where they located their branches. In collaboration with community activists, Flynn raised a more than year-long campaign to pressure banks to change their practices. He also announced a plan to issue a regular city-sponsored "report card" on bank practices. He also adopted a "linked deposit" policy to have the city then withdraw funds from banks that received poor track records on these "report cards" to expand its deposits in banks which worked to meet the needs of the city's neighborhoods. As a consequence, the banks reached a $400 million community reinvestment agreement with the city, in which the banks promised to open new branches, change lending and hiring practices, and to collaborate more closely with community development corporations and community groups.

=== Fiscal matters ===
When Flynn took office, the city had a $40 million deficit. Flynn was able to balance the city's budget each year he was in office and improved the fiscal controls of the city. Flynn was able to improve the city's bond rating each year he was in office. When he left office, the city had its highest bond rating in its history.

In his first term as mayor, Flynn dealt with a drastic cut in federal funds allocated to Boston. During the presidencies of Republicans Ronald Reagan and George H. W. Bush, Flynn often blamed shortcomings of the city government on their administrations for what he claimed were insufficient federal funds coming into the city's coffers. Additionally, during the Massachusetts governorship of Republican Bill Weld, Flynn often faulted shortcomings of the city government on what he claimed was insufficient state funding, blaming Governor Weld but avoiding blaming the Democratic majorities in both chambers of the Massachusetts State Legislature.

During his mayoralty, Boston divested from corporations that invested in Northern Ireland and Apartheid South Africa.

==== Revenue package ====
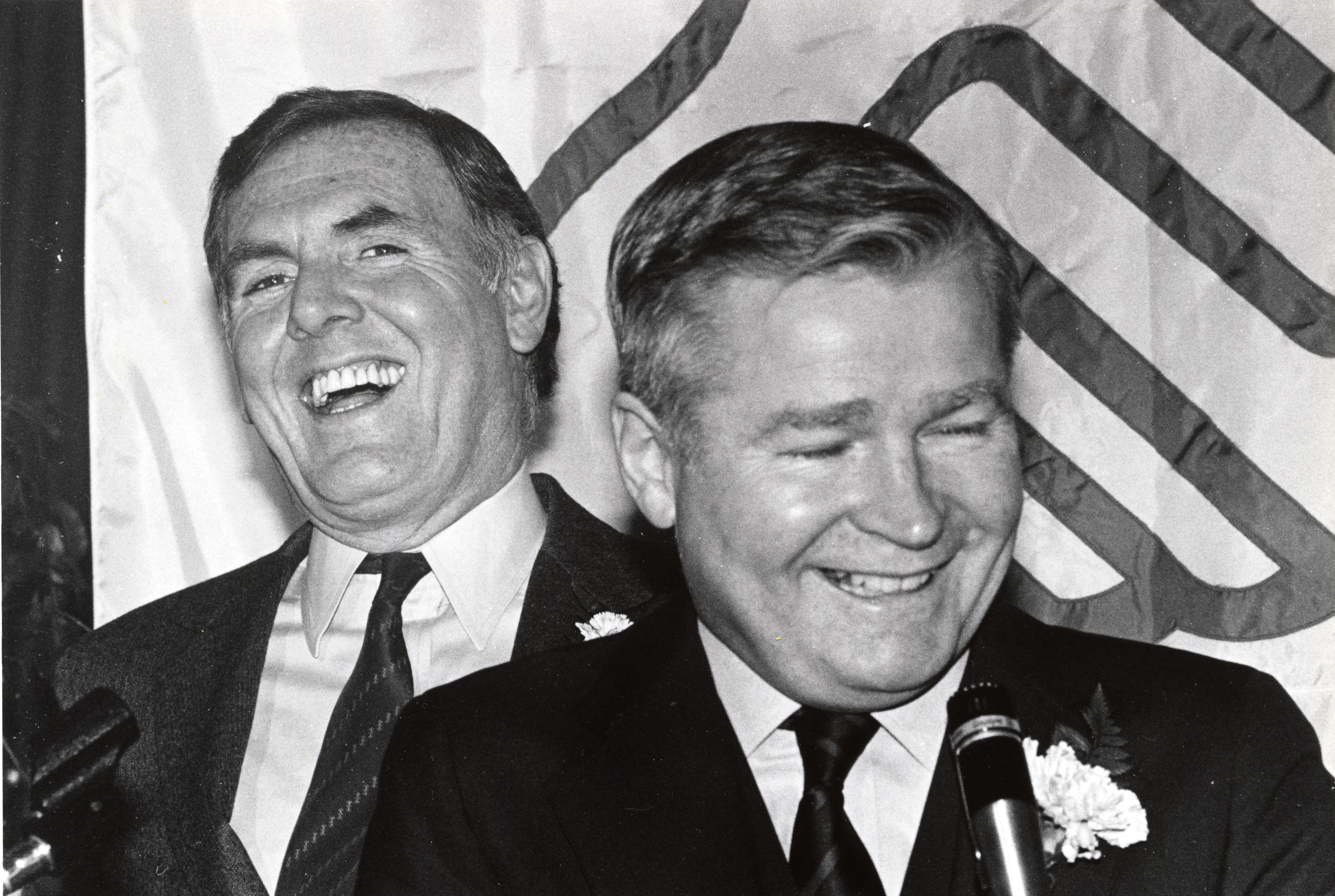
Flynn, with William Bulger, the Massachusetts Senate president (circa 1984–1987)

To address the city's deficit, upon taking office, Flynn worked to receive additional state aid and state legislature authorization to raise new local taxes. The state, at the time, viewed the city government as wasteful and inefficient. Flynn needed the help of the city's business community to convince the state. Particularly the business community's watchdog group, the Boston Municipal Research Bureau. In order to convince the business community that the Flynn administration was going to spend new revenues in a cost-effective manner, he recruited business community members to top positions in the municipal budget and treasury departments, and also created an advisory committee on management and budget operations that featured representatives from the business community. Flynn heeded the advice of this advisory committee, and "opened the books" on the city's fiscal situation, something that his immediate predecessor, Kevin White, had refused to do himself. Ultimately, the Municipal Research Bureau gave its approval to Flynn's revenue package and lobbied for it.

Flynn also met across the state with individuals and groups such as local officials, business groups, and trade unions in order to persuade them to lobby their own legislators to support the state legislation he was seeking. Flynn made the argument that Boston's economic and fiscal health was critical to that of all of Massachusetts. He characterized Boston as being a generator of jobs and state sales tax revenue, as well as the home to institutions which benefited the entire state.

In 1984, the initial revenue package that Flynn championed was defeated in the state legislature. In 1985, Flynn proposed and lobbied for a revised revenue package. This revenue package passed, and was signed into law by Governor Dukakis.

=== Labor matters ===
Flynn created the "Boston jobs" program, requiring that developers that obtained city permits to hire Boston residents for half of all their construction jobs, minorities for one quarter of all their construction jobs, and women for one-tenth of all their construction jobs.

When Boston hotel owners and Hotel Employees and Restaurant Employees Union Local 26 were in conflict, and looked headed towards a long and tense strike in 1985, Flynn had his police chief privately inform hotel owners that they could not expect to rely the Boston Police Department to protect strikebreakers or preserve order outside and within hotel establishments. This action of Flynn helped weaken the resolve of the hotel owners, who settled with Local 26, netting the union a significant victory.

When Flynn traveled to southwestern Virginia to support coal mining households during the Pittston Coal strike against the Pittston Coal Group, he learned from United Mine Workers President Richard Trumka that William Craig, a member of Pittston's board, was also vice chairman of Shawmut Bank, the city of Boston's second largest lender. Upon returning to the city, Flynn threatened that Boston would withdraw its deposits from the bank unless Craig resigned from the board of Pittston.

== Education and childcare ==
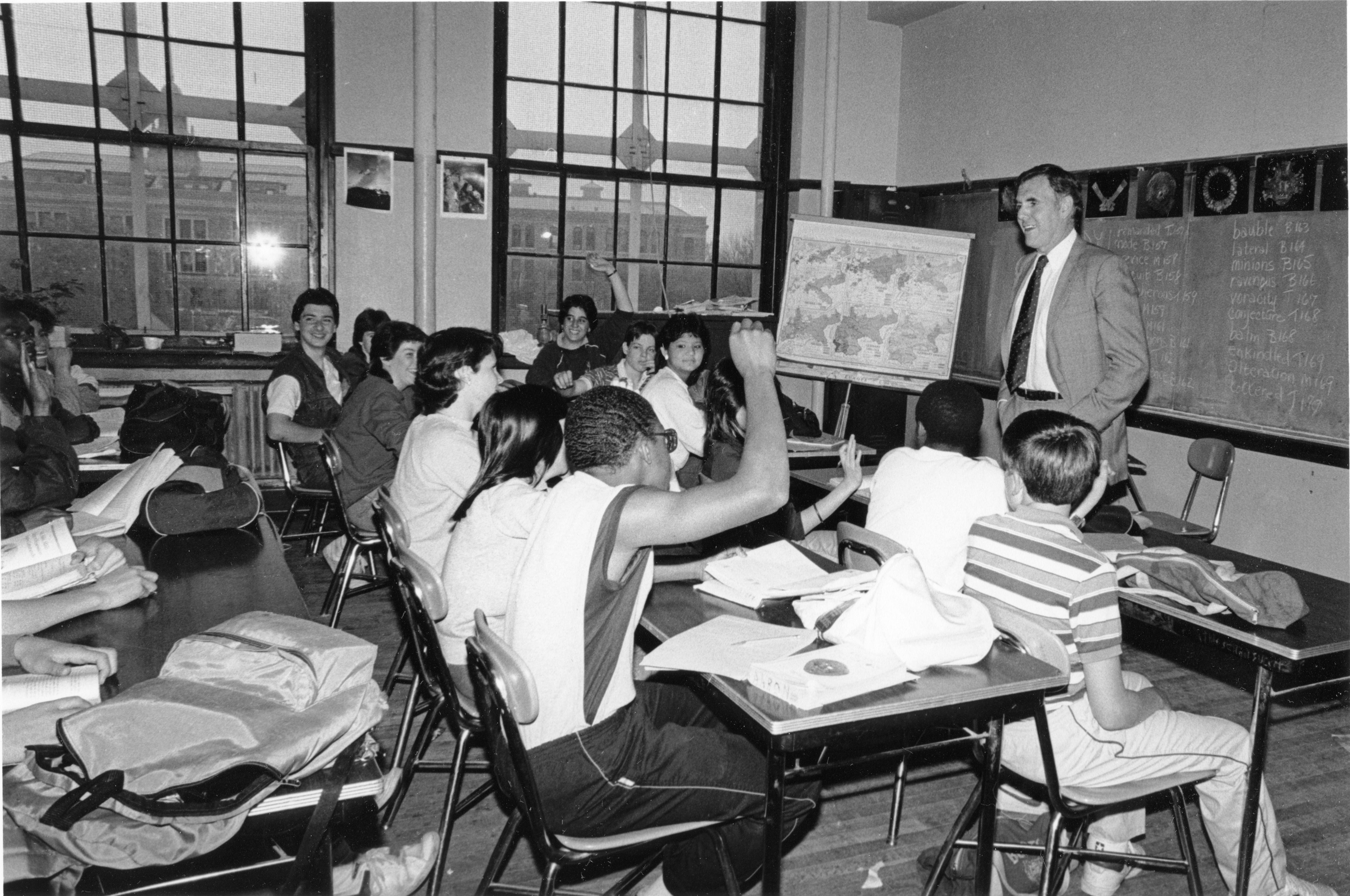
Flynn speaks to children in a classroom (circa 1984–1987)

In 1989, Flynn spearheaded the creation of a policy which requires that new commercial developments in the city's downtown provide childcare services on-site or otherwise fund resources for off-site childcare spaces. However, the policy would, for decades, prove difficult to enforce due to the fact that the policy did not provide a clear definition of the amounts that developers needed to pay for off-site childcare spaces. This was addressed in 2022, when Mayor Michelle Wu signed an executive order outlining a formula to determine the amount of these payments.

In 1993, George B. Merry wrote that while Flynn had "vastly upgraded" the city's public school system as mayor, at the time of Flynn's departure from the mayoralty, the school district, "appear[ed] to be facing an uncertain future."

In July 1991, Flynn won a fight to turn Boston School Committee from an elected school board to one whose members are appointed by the mayor. This change took effect in January 1992. Before this change, the elected school board had come to be regarded as fractious. As he approached his departure as mayor in 1993, Flynn questioned whether the change had been a good decision. He conceded that it had disenfranchised the input of voters in shaping the school board, and had upset many communities of color in the city. In 1993, little over a year since the appointed board had taken office, disorder had already arisen on the board, and Black organizers in the city were pushing to revert to an elected school board. In July 1993, Flynn remarked,

Let me acknowledge that taking the right to vote away from people is not a pleasant thing for me. It's a big issue in the minority community. I know it. I still hear it...and it's a very valid concern.

Flynn also conceded that the appointed school board had failed in terms of accountability, remarking in 1993,

When I argued for an appointed school board, I spoke about the power of accountability...Accountability was the critical element of change. That's how it should work. But it hasn't worked that way. It's time to change that.

In 1993, Flynn wrote an open letter to those seeking to run in the 1993 Boston mayoral election to succeed him which pronounced his regret for having changed the city's school board to an appointed board, and which expressed his preference for reverting it back to an elected one. This was to no avail, and Boston remains the only municipality in Massachusetts without an elected school board.

== Public safety and law enforcement ==
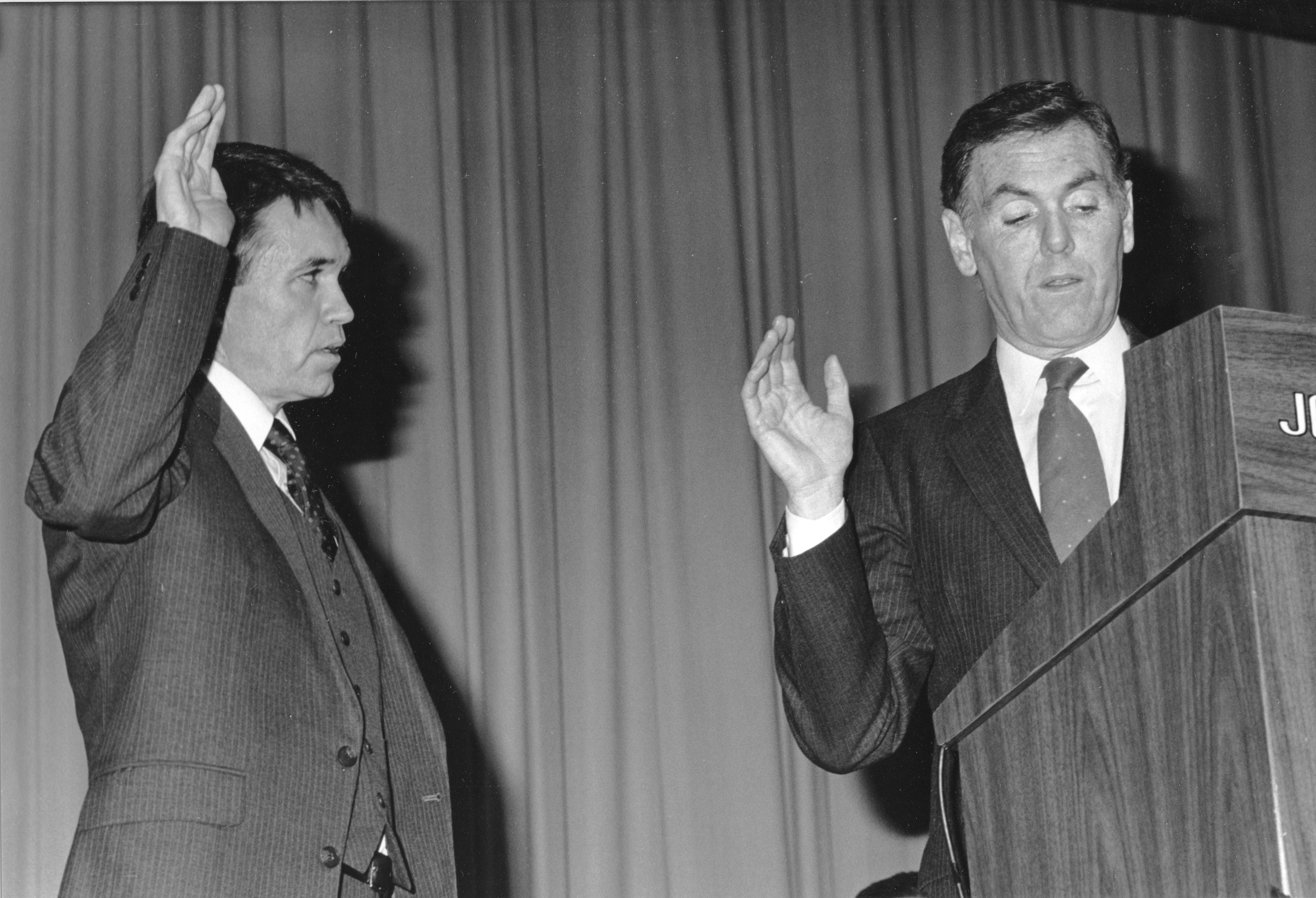
Flynn swearing-in Francis Roache as police commissioner in 1985

In 1985, Flynn appointed Francis Roache as the city's police commissioner. Roache was a childhood friend of Flynn, and would be one of his closet associates during his mayoralty.

Flynn's administration funded neighborhood watch groups.

In 1990, Flynn received strong criticism from Black leaders over the city police's handling of the investigation into the murder of Carol Stuart, including the arrest and intensive search of William Bennett. Flynn had instructed for a citywide manhunt for murderer after the killing. Decades later, in 2023, then-mayor Michelle Wu apologized on behalf of the city for the impact that police conduct in the investigation Stuart's murder had upon the African-American community in the city, especially in Mission Hill. Her apology was directly addressed to Bennett as well as Alan Swanson, both of whom she acknowledged had been wrongly treated as suspects.

In response to concerns over the police department (including those stemming from the investigation into Carol Stuart's murder), in May 1991, Flynn empaneled the St. Clair Commission, headed by James D. St. Clair. In January 1992, the St. Clair Commission released its report, which was critical of the Boston Police Department for mismanagement, and urged against reappointing Commissioner Roache when his term expired that April. Flynn appointed William Bratton to serve as the city's new police commissioner.

At the end of Flynn's tenure, in 1993, George B. Merry observed that crime in the city remained "a continuing problem".

== Racial relations ==
Before Flynn took office, Boston had seen a very high level of racial tensions in the 1970s. Retrospectively, in 2023 Michael Jonas of Commonwealth magazine wrote that, as mayor, Flynn went "to great lengths to promote racial harmony and heal divisions, not inflame them." In 1993, George B. Merry observed,

While it would be a mistake to suggest Boston has been free of racial tensions during Flynn's years as mayor, his leadership has addressed the needs of minorities, including not only blacks but the fast-growing Hispanic and Asian populations. But the problem lingers.

Early into his mayoralty, Flynn signaled his support for racially integrating the city's neighborhoods when he directly assisted a number of black households with moving into a public housing development located in a neighborhood with a majority white working-class population. During Flynn's mayoralty, the City of Boston regained control over the Boston Housing Authority, which had previously been in court receivership. Weeks before the 1987 mayoral election, Flynn publicized a plan to desegregate all-white housing developments of the Boston Housing Authority located in South Boston. In 1988, the city of Boston reached a formal agreement with the federal government to integrate public housing in South Boston.

A 1987 poll published by The Boston Globe found that the Boston residents were expressing increasingly optimistic outlooks on the state of race relations in the city. Many of the city's politicians, while questioning whether the public was correct in such an assessment, expressed the belief that this sentiment was reflective of the public's perception of Flynn's leadership in regards to race relations.

== Urban development ==
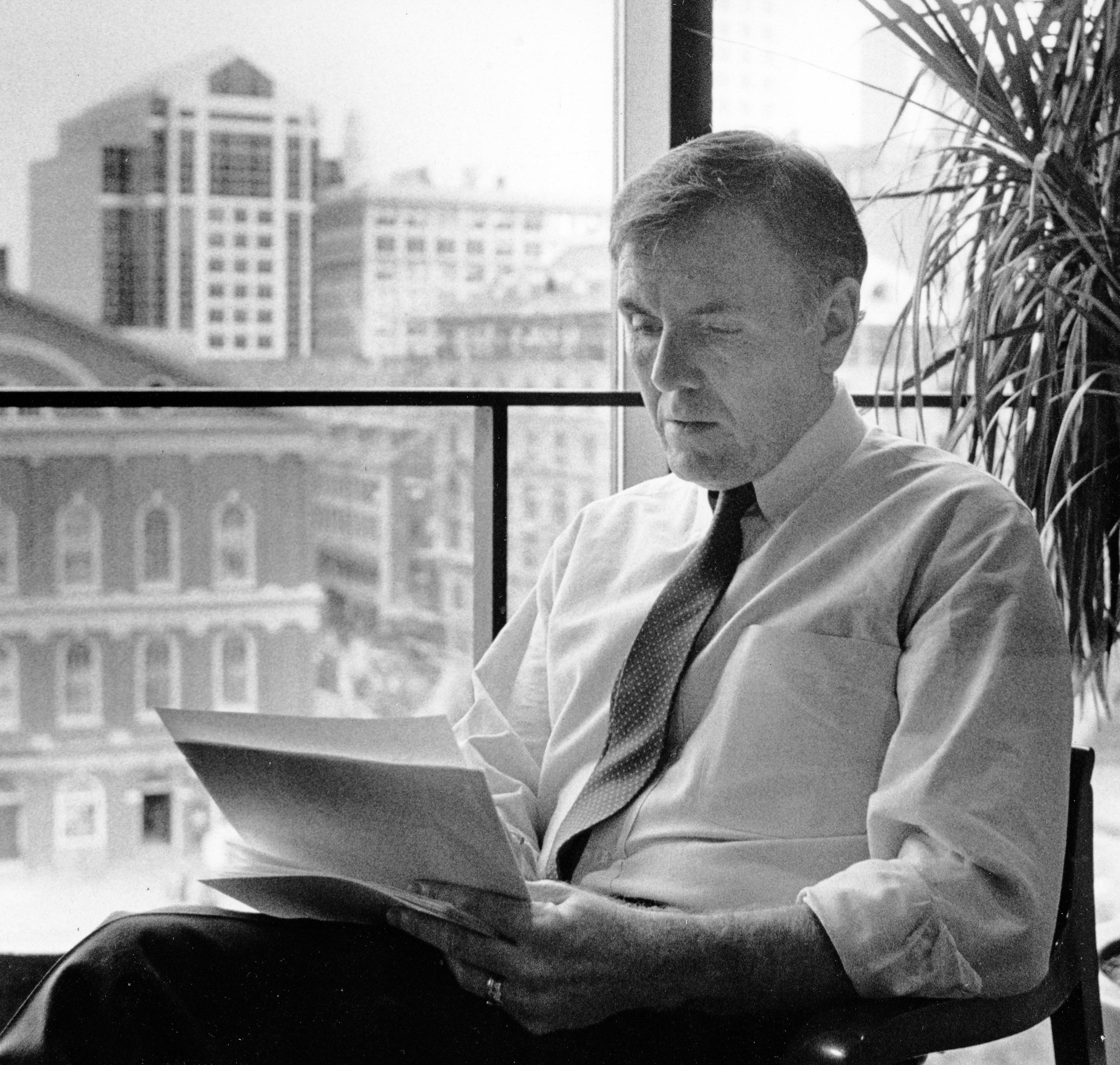
Flynn working at the mayor's office in Boston City Hall (circa 1984–1987)

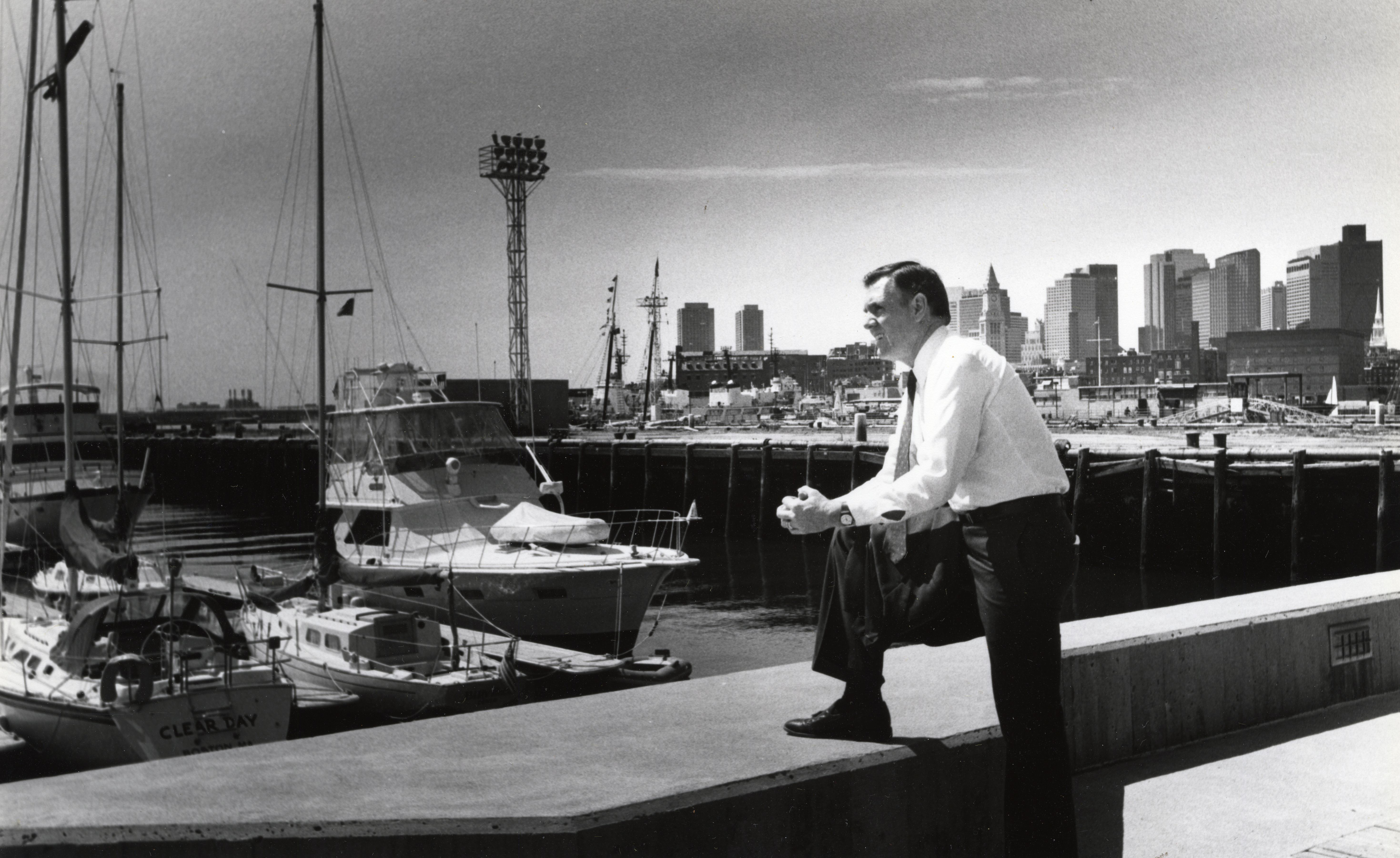
Flynn at the Boston waterfront (circa 1984–1987)

Flynn took office amid a period of urban flight by the city's middle class. Peter Dreier would describe Flynn as having been elected "with a populist mandate to 'share the prosperity' of Boston's downtown economic boom—particularly in terms of jobs and housing—with the city's poor and working-class residents." Flynn had campaigned for office in his initial election on a housing-focused platform. When Flynn took office, downtown real estate developers were highly worried by his populist agenda. Flynn opted not to socialize with real estate developers, and refused to take political contributions from developers that had projects being considered by the city government.

When Flynn assumed office, the federal government was greatly decreasing federal funding for urban housing, job training, and economic development programs. Boston had been reliant on federal funding for these uses for the preceding quarter-century. Flynn looked to the private sector. He worked to use public-private partnerships as well as government regulatory tools of the private sector such as zoning and rent control. Flynn was successful in his fight to implement rent control laws in the city.

During Flynn's mayoralty, the city had a strong development market, and he was regarded to be a "pro-development" mayor. Flynn also focused on addressing the quality of life in neighborhoods, as well as on addressing gentrification.

Major government projects constructed during his mayoralty included the new Boston City Hospital complex. The city also created what was its first long-term capital plan for fixing its streets, infrastructure, school structures, and for creating new precinct stations and recreation centers. The city also significantly improved its parks and recreation centers.

During Flynn's mayoralty, the city's development director, Stephen Coyle, oversaw the institution of controversial "downzoning" growth management safeguards aimed at combatting the "Manhattanization" of the city's historic downtown and neighborhoods.

=== Neighborhood renewal ===
After a five-year campaign by Flynn and community activists, United States Secretary of Housing and Urban Development Samuel Pierce agreed to hand over to community-based non profits and tenant organizations a total of 2,000 HUD-subsidized apartments located in roughly 70 buildings that had been abandoned by property owners. Additionally, Boston had success in addressing problems in troubled HUD public housing projects. Clinton's HUD Secretary, Henry Cisneros, later decided to change HUD policy to replicate this.

Flynn's administration collaborated on development with nonprofit organizations. The Flynn administration provided neighborhood groups significant influence in planning and development decisions, as well as other matters. To do this he worked with neighborhood councils, zoning committees, and project-specific advisory groups. They worked with community development corporations to undertake the rehabilitation of thousands of housing units in the city. A very notable example of collaboration saw the city government delegate its own urban renewal powers (including eminent domain authority) to the Dudley Street Neighborhood Initiative, a community group in the Roxbury neighborhood who are allowed to use that authority in parts of the neighborhood. Flynn agreed to give the group eminent domain powers in 1989.

=== Housing ===
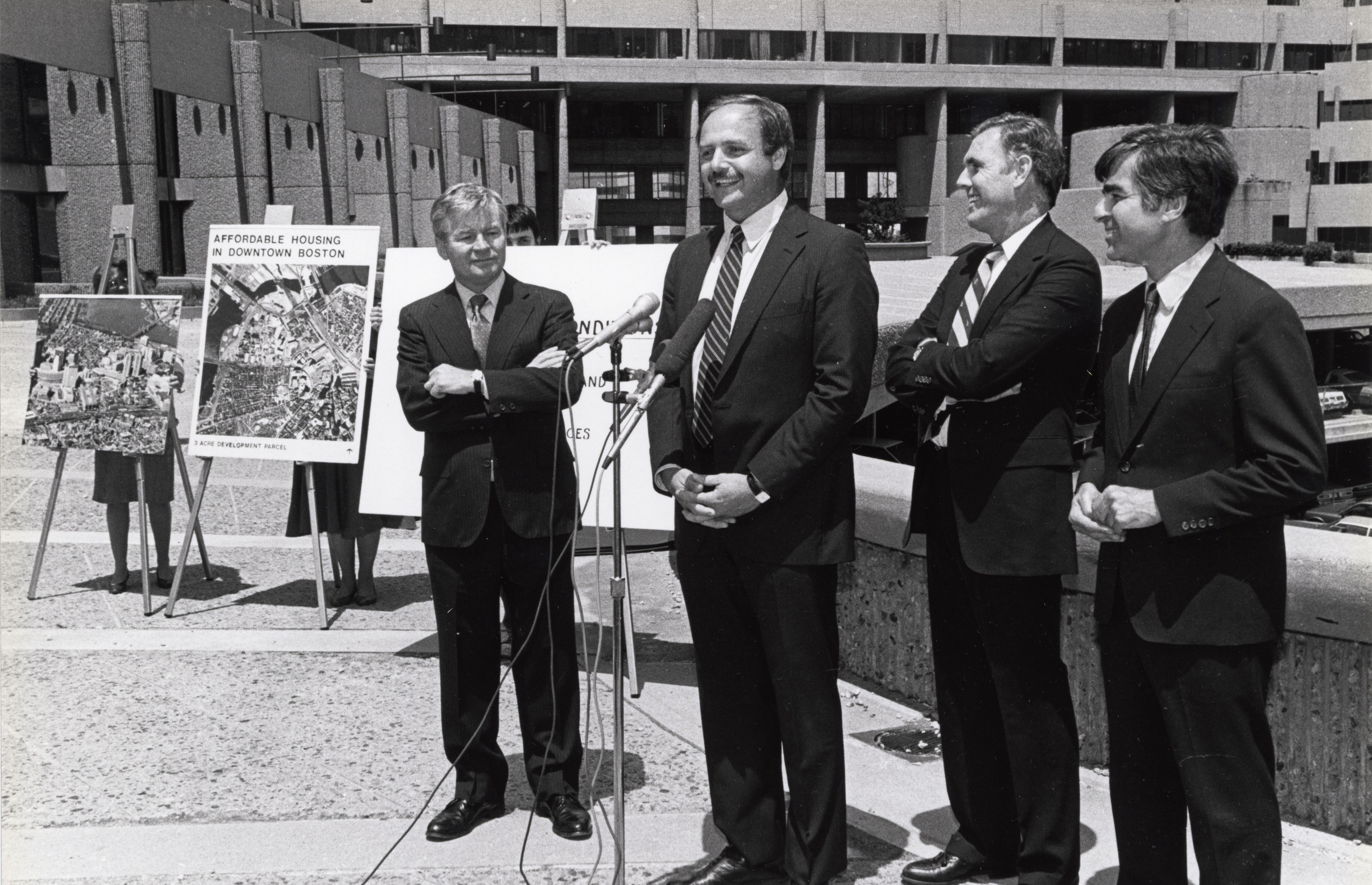
Flynn (second from right) is joined by Massachusetts Sen. Pes. William Bulger (left), State Rep. Salvatore DiMasi (second from left), and Governor Michael Dukakis (far right) at a press conference on affordable housing (circa 1984–87)

The city built what was an unprecedented number of new units of affordable housing during Flynn's mayoralty. Flynn's administration successfully overcame the political forces of the city's real estate industry to put in place a policy that doubled the linkage fee funds that downtown developers were required to provide to neighborhood housing funds. Over the course of his mayoralty, this fund received over $70 million, and helped in the city's creation of over 8,000 units of affordable housing.

Flynn's prevailed over heated political fights to enact legislation imposing rent control measures and strengthening the city's tenants' rights laws statutes. Both of these attracted disdain from landlords. Flynn's administration funded the efforts of tenant groups to organized against landlords who treated tenants poorly. In 1986, Flynn worked successfully with tenant activists to get the Boston City Council to pass a ban on developers evicting tenants in order to clear apartment buildings for condominium conversions. In 1988, he worked to successfully get the City Council to empower the city's rent board with regulatory powers over condo conversions and lodging houses. Flynn also got the City Council to put in place rent control on projects in the city subsidized by United States Department of Housing and Urban Development if the owners exercised the option to prepay their federally subsidized mortgages. These moves potentially protected thousands of subsidized units in the city from conversion to market-rate housing.

Flynn also championed inclusionary housing policies that would require developers of market-rate housing to provide units for moderate and low-income residents. In July 1986, Flynn presented the Boston Redevelopment Authority with a potential policy to require private developers to designate 10% of their housing units in projects with at least ten units for moderate and low-income residents. This push faced strong opposition.

Despite the addition of new affordable housing units, efforts to empower tenants, and the imposing of rent control measures; prices of housing in Boston significantly increased over the course of Flynn's mayoralty.

== State, national, and international politics ==
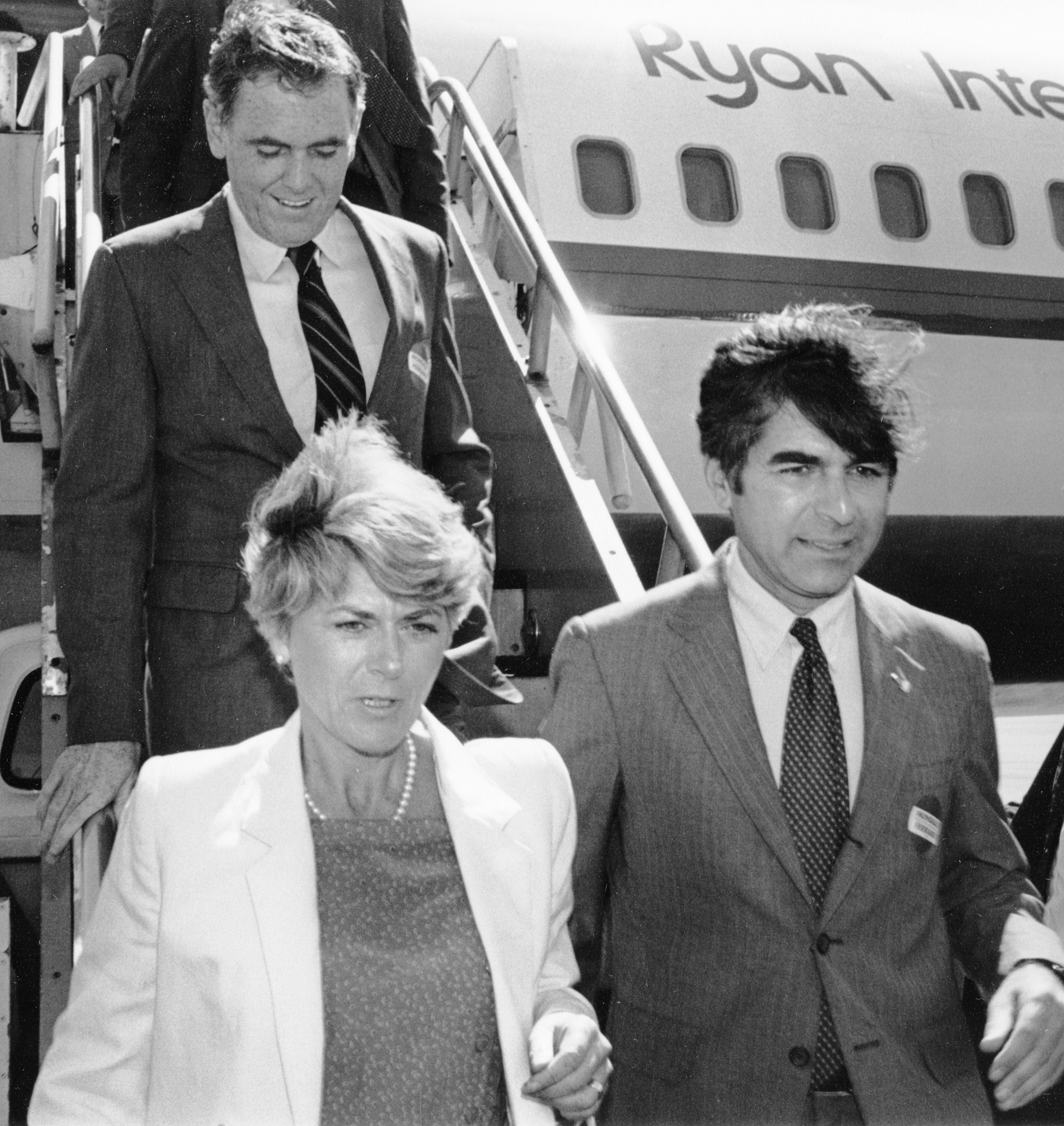
Flynn and Governor Dukakis campaigning with Democratic vice presidential nominee Geraldine Ferraro before the 1984 presidential election

Flynn was an outspoken critic of the cuts that President Ronald Reagan championed making to federal revenue sharing, urban development grants, and housing and job assistance programs. In February 1984, during the 1984 Democratic presidential primaries, Flynn endorsed the candidacy of former vice president Walter Mondale, who ultimately won the nomination but lost the general election to the incumbent Reagan. Flynn argued that Mondale was a superior to his chief opponent in the primaries, Senator Gary Hart, in representing, "the traditional Democratic values - helping the poor, the elderly, the homeless and the hungry." He also hailed Mondale as a, "fighter for social justice."

Flynn considered running in the 1990 Massachusetts gubernatorial election, but, due to police controversies, his struggling relationship with the minority community, and his anti-abortion stance, he ruled out a run.

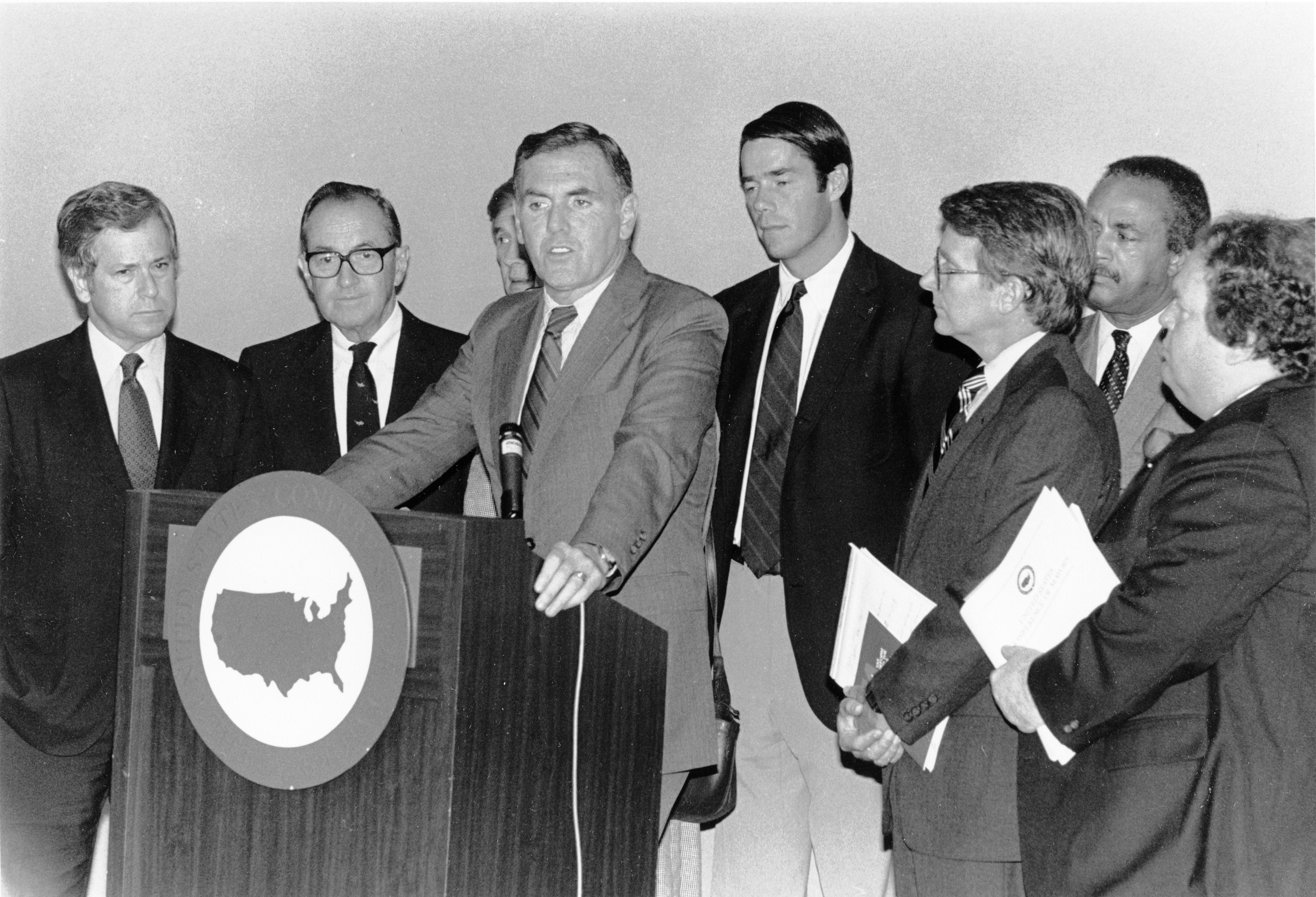
Mayor Flynn (at the podium), speaking as chair of the United States Conference of Mayors' Task Force on Hunger and Homelessness with Trenton Mayor Arthur John Holland and Charleston (SC) Mayor Joseph P. Riley,Jr. 1987

Flynn became a national leader on urban matters. In 1987, as chair of the United States Conference of Mayors' Task Force on Hunger and Homelessness, Flynn advocated for the passage of the McKinney–Vento Homeless Assistance Act. He was appointed on July 1, 1993, and presented his credentials on September 2, 1993. Flynn served as president of the United States Conference of Mayors during 1991–92. In this role, he challenged the theories of some pundits that cities were becoming economically obsolete due to the rise of "edge city" suburbanization, by arguing that "as cities go, so goes America."

Flynn visited South Africa several times to see anti-apartheid figure Nelson Mandela when he was in prison. In June 1990, four months after Mandela's release from prison, Flynn welcomed him to Boston on a trip Mandela took visiting many cities in the United States.

Ahead of the 1992 United States presidential election, there was some talk about whether Flynn could be a prospective vice presidential running mate on a Democratic ticket. In February 1992, Flynn unsuccessfully urged New York Governor Mario Cuomo to run in the presidential election. It took Flynn a while to grow warm to the Democratic Party's ultimate presidential nominee, Bill Clinton. He endorsed Clinton in late June 1992. Flynn, a lifelong anti-abortion activist, played a role in drawing the anti-abortion ("pro-life") Catholic vote to pro-abortion rights Bill Clinton in the general election. Flynn physically campaigned on Clinton's behalf in roughly half of the nation's states.

Despite opposition to gun control measures earlier in his political career, as mayor Flynn supported such policy, heavily campaigning in support of the passage of the Brady Bill.

In the late-1980s, Flynn partnered with community housing organizations to draft the federal Community Housing Partnership Act. This was then sponsored by Senator Frank Lautenberg and Congressman Joseph Kennedy, and received the endorsements of organizations such as the U.S. Conference of Mayors, National League of Cities, National Low-Income Housing Coalition. The bill was ultimately incorporated into the broader Cranston-Gonzales National Affordable Housing Act, which was passed by the U.S. Congress and signed into law by President George H. W. Bush in October 1990. The act provided federal funding to community-based organizations to assist them in the construction and renovation of affordable housing.

== Resignation and succession ==
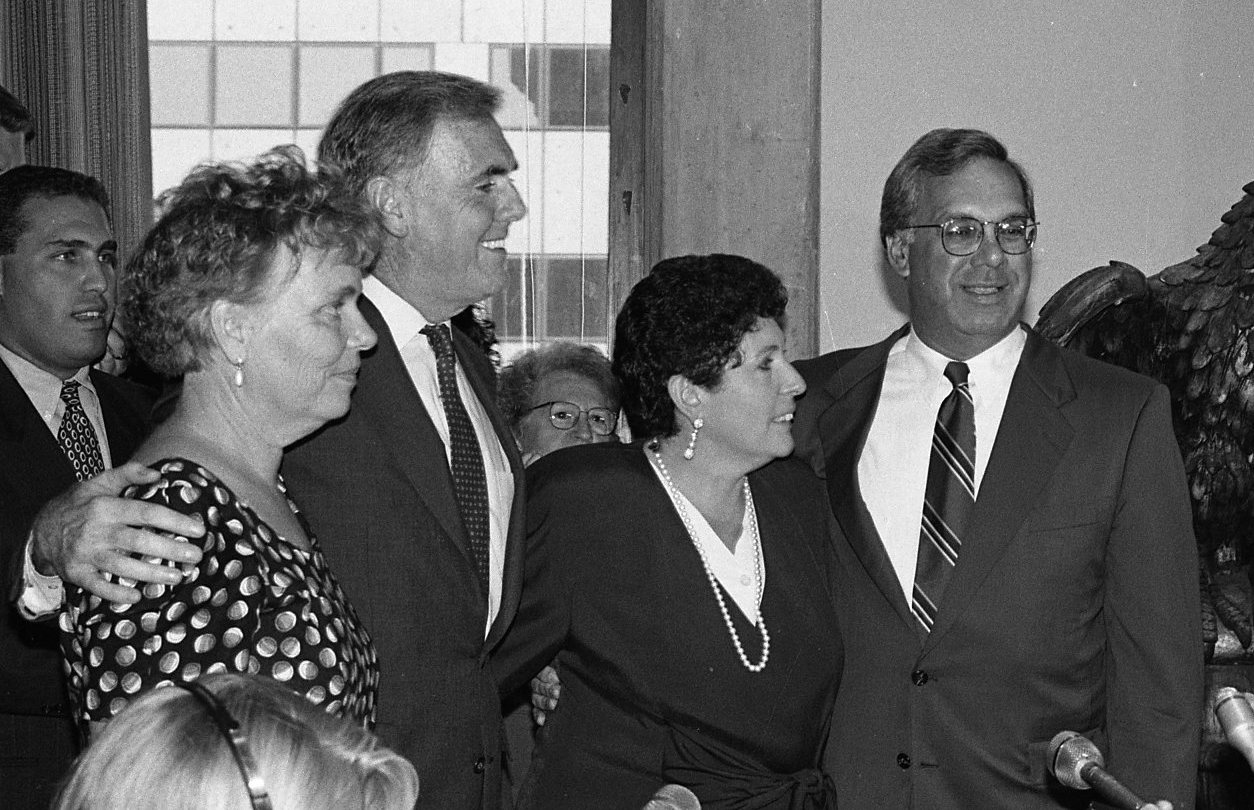
Flynn and his wife, Kathy, attending the ceremonial swearing-in of Thomas Menino as acting mayor

In 1993, Flynn resigned during his third term as mayor when he was appointed by Clinton to serve as United States Ambassador to the Holy See (the Vatican). Flynn was nominated in March 1993, and announced he would be resigning as mayor. However, in June, he reconsidered whether he would accept the role. He met with President Clinton and United States State Department officials to better define what his role would be as ambassador. The Senate unanimously confirmed his appointment that month, and he resigned as mayor on July 12, 1993.

Upon the announcement of Flynn's nomination, it became anticipated that then-Boston City Council President Thomas Menino was, per the city charter, going to assume the office of "acting mayor" upon Flynn's expected resignation. Flynn had had a longtime friendship with Menino. However, their relationship was noted to have become somewhat terser during the period in which Flynn was preparing to hand over the office to Menino. One cause for their rift was that, after Menino had promised he would appoint 100 new police officers when he took office, Flynn beat him to the chase and did so himself, which angered Menino.

When Flynn resigned on July 12, 1993, Menino became acting mayor. Menino would go on to win the 1993 Boston mayoral election, becoming mayor.

== See also ==
- Mayoralty of Thomas Menino
- Mayoralty of Marty Walsh
- Mayoralty of Michelle Wu

Political offices
Preceded by Kevin White	Mayor of Boston, Massachusetts; January 2, 1984–July 12, 1993	Succeeded by Thomas Menino (tenure)
