= David Finnegan =

American lawyer

Chairman of the Boston School Committee
- In office 1978–1979
- Preceded by: Kathleen Sullivan
- Succeeded by: John J. McDonough

Personal details
- Born: January 28, 1941
- Died: October 12, 2015 (aged 74) Bluffton, South Carolina
- Education: Stonehill College; Boston University School of Law; Harvard University
- Occupation: Attorney; Talk Show Host; Politician

David Ignatius Finnegan (January 28, 1941 – October 12, 2015) was an American attorney, talk show host, and politician. He was a partner at Finnegan, Underwood, Ryan & Tierney.

== Political career ==
Finnegan was a member of the Boston School Committee from 1975 to 1979 and served as its president from 1978 to 1979. He was a candidate for Mayor of Boston in 1979, finishing fourth out of six candidates with 14.59% of the vote. He ran again in 1983, finishing in third place with 24.99%.

== Talk show host ==
Finnegan began his media career in 1979 as host of The Dave Finnegan Show on WBZ Radio. He subsequently hosted Weekend with Dave Finnegan on WNAC-TV. He gave up both of his shows to run for Mayor in 1983.

== Personal life ==
Finnegan was born on January 28, 1941. He was the brother-in-law of astronaut Michael Collins and the uncle of actress Kate Collins.

He was a graduate of Stonehill College (B.A.), Boston University School of Law (J.D.), and Harvard University (A.L.M.).

Finnegan died on October 12, 2015, from lung cancer.
