= 1983 Boston mayoral election =

Election in Massachusetts, United States

- November 15, 1983
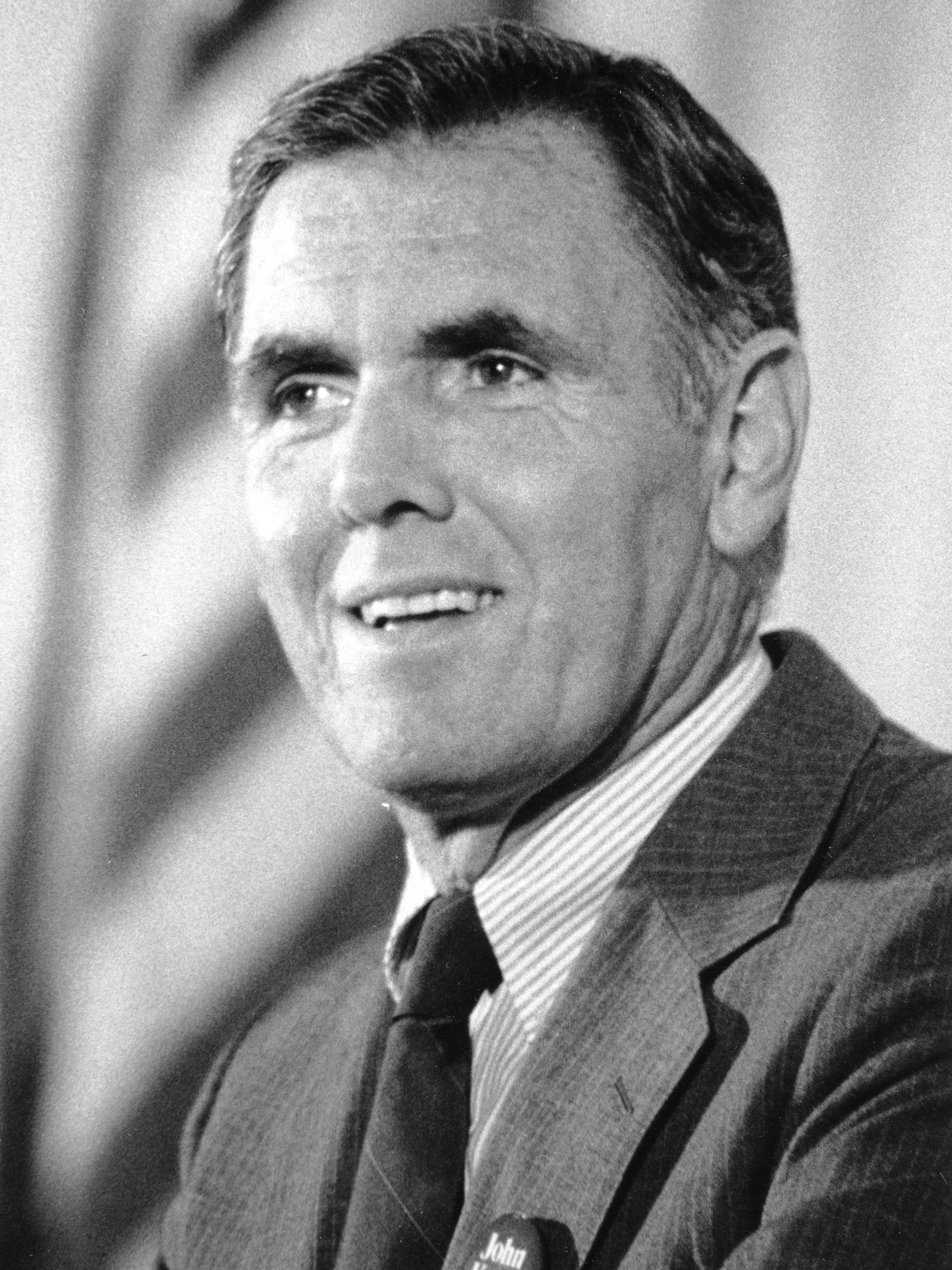

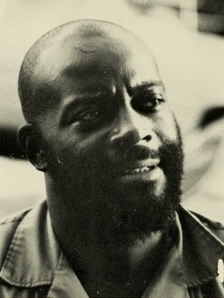
Candidate	Raymond Flynn	Mel King
Party	Nonpartisan	Nonpartisan
Popular vote	128,578	69,015
Percentage	65.07%	34.93%
- Flynn: 50–60% 60–70% 70–80% 80–90% >90% King: 50–60% 60–70% 70–80% 80–90% >90%
Mayor before election
Kevin White
Elected mayor
Raymond Flynn

The Boston mayoral election of 1983 was held on Tuesday, November 15, 1983, between City Councillor Raymond Flynn and former State Representative Mel King. Flynn was elected to his first term, and inaugurated on Monday, January 2, 1984.

The nonpartisan municipal preliminary election was held on Tuesday, October 11, 1983. King's second-place finish in the preliminary election made him the first African-American candidate to be a finalist in a Boston mayoral election.

== Candidates ==
- Raymond Flynn, Member of the Boston City Council since 1978 and state representative from 1971 to 1979.
- Mel King, Member of the Massachusetts House of Representatives from 1973 to 1983.

Candidates eliminated in preliminary election

- Lawrence DiCara, member of the Boston City Council from 1972 to 1981, Council President in 1978.
- David Finnegan, president of the Boston School Committee from 1975 to 1979 and a radio/television talk show host.
- Michael Gelber, member of the LaRouche movement.
- Dennis J. Kearney, Sheriff of Suffolk County since 1981.
- Bob Kiley (dropped out), Deputy Mayor from 1972 to 1975 and general manager of the Massachusetts Bay Transportation Authority from 1975 to 1979.
- Frederick C. Langone, member Boston City Council in 1961, and from 1964 to 1983.
- Eloise Linger, member of the Socialist Workers Party.

== Primary election ==
=== Kevin White's decision to forgo reelection ===
On March 20, incumbent mayor Kevin White told WCVB-TV's Frank Avruch that he planned on running for an unprecedented fifth term. However, soon after the announcement, aides to the mayor retracted his statement, saying that it was "facetious" and "jocular". White did not officially confirm that he would not seek a fifth term until May 26, 1983, by which point several candidates had already announced their candidacies for mayor. This was the first open seat race for mayor since White was first elected in 1967. White did not endorse any candidate to succeed him.

=== Raymond Flynn and Mel King's campaigns ===
On March 5, 1983, former State Representative Mel King became the first candidate to officially enter the race. The focus of his campaign was decentralizing the city's government and bringing together its racially polarized population. His announcement came on the 213th anniversary of the death of Crispus Attucks during the Boston Massacre. King framed his vision for the future as being, "to help create a city that has open access, a city that is open and caring." King was the only African American candidate in the election. Having finished third in the mayoral primary four years prior, King sought to expand his base of support by building what he dubbed a "Rainbow Coalition", which included African Americans (especially those of middle class or low-income means), hispanic Americans, Asian Americans, students, gay people, progressive-leaning whites, and working class whites.

On April 27, City Councillor Raymond Flynn announced his candidacy. As part of his announcement he released "The Flynn Program for Boston", a 30-page booklet outlining his proposals for jobs, housing, crime, services, and other issues.

Both Flynn and King were considered to be on the liberal wing of the Democratic Party. Flynn and King had both shaped the narrative of debate among candidates during the hotly contested primary, successfully creating a "downtown versus the neighborhoods" narrative, with Flynn and King taking the side of being in support of the city's neighborhoods. A major item of debate was linkage, a fee that would be placed on downtown developers to raise funds for affordable housing. Flynn and King placed in the primary above candidates who were perceived as more representative of "downtown" interests. Coinciding with the primary, voters also strongly approved non-binding referendums in favor of a linkage policy and the creation of neighborhood councils. Both referendums had been supported by the group Massachusetts Fair Share. Flynn and King were the only two candidates in favor of imposing linkage fees. Both touted their support for greater neighborhood control and a greater focus on aiding the city's outer areas that had felt overlooked during the previous two decades' downtown building boom. Notably, in a city where racial strife had been so prominent throughout the 1970s, racial matters did not play a prominent role in the debate among candidates.

During the primary, the city's progressive activists were largely sharply divided between Flynn and King's candidacies. The candidates both benefited from grassroots support.

Two weeks before the preliminary election, a poll by The Boston Globe showed that King was in a dead heat with Finnegan and Flynn. King's campaign gained momentum through a voter registration drive and visits from Chicago Mayor Harold Washington and Atlanta Mayor Andrew Young, both being recently-elected African American mayors of major American cities. The Washington Post wrote that as many as half of the 52,000 residents that were newly registered to vote ahead of the election had been minorities presumably registered by King's efforts.

The Washington Post wrote that the campaign had, in the final month before the primary, become a three-person contest between Flynn, King, and David Finnegan. The Washington Post described the campaign as having remained "cordial and issue-oriented," with each of the three leading candidates, "Appealing to different constituencies in the variegated Boston political mix and articulat[ing] different visions of the city."

=== David Finnegan's campaign ===
Former School Board president and popular radio talk show host David Finnegan announced his candidacy on April 21 at the Strand Theatre in Uphams Corner. Finnegan chose to make his announcement in Uphams Corner because White had not fulfilled his promise to rebuild the neighborhood and the man he appointed to run the project was jailed. He attempted to portray himself as the best candidate to defeat Mayor White and used the campaign slogan "Finnegan or him again." Later, after White announced that he was not running, Finnegan would change his campaign slogan to "Begin Again with Finnegan".

Finnegan was an early front-runner in the election, but saw his lead dissipate as the primary grew nearer and the election became a three-person contest between him, Flynn and King. Finnegan raised $800,000 in campaign contributions, four times as much as any other of the leading candidates did in the primary. He spent much of his campaign funds on television advertising and radio advertising. Although he had the most campaign funds and was considered to be a favorite to make the runoff election, Finnegan was criticized for running a "safe" campaign and for "lack[ing] substance".

Finnegan's campaign was described by The Washington Post as being "restrained...by Boston standards," with the noted exception of accusing Flynn of racism for having distributed different brochures for his campaign in different neighborhoods (with the ones given to heavily black neighborhoods featuring photographs of Flynn with black people, and the ones distributed to white neighborhoods instead featuring photographs of him with white people.

=== Lawrence DiCara's campaign ===
Lawrence DiCara's campaign message was centered upon fostering harmony in the city, with DiCara pledging to be "everybody's mayor". DiCara gave campaign launch speeches in each of the city's neighborhoods. Launching his campaign prior to White's announcement that he was not seeking reelection, DiCara initially hoped to strike a contrast to the downtown-focused mayor by being a candidate focused on all of the city's neighborhoods. DiCara would later write in his book Turmoil and Transition in Boston that his campaign message had been out-of-step with the sentiments of Boston voters:

My slogan of wanting to be "everybody's mayor" was not in sync with those residents who wanted their own personal mayor who reflected their views...and my relentless efforts to show voters I was the most qualified were not responsive to their personal concerns.

Shortly before the primary election, Bob Kiley withdrew from the race and endorsed DiCara.

=== Other campaigns ===
On March 15, former Deputy Mayor and Massachusetts Bay Transportation Authority general manager Bob Kiley became the second candidate to enter the race.

On April 19, City Councillor Frederick C. Langone declared his candidacy. Langone was accused of running as a publicity stunt, a charge which the Councillor denied. In an effort to prove that his campaign was serious, he announced that he would not seek another city council term.

On April 24, Suffolk County Sheriff Dennis J. Kearney declared his candidacy at Faneuil Hall. He promised that if elected he would create an office of internal affairs to investigate "fraud, waste and abuse". He also promised to hire 99 new police officers each year for the next three years, a plan which would cost the city $3 million.

LaRouche movement member Michael Gelber announced that he was entering the race on May 6.

=== Debates ===
On April 26, DiCara, Finnegan, Flynn, Kearney, Kiley, King, Langone and Linger participated in the first mayoral debate.

Television played a far more significant role in elections by 1983 than it had in 1967 during the previous open seat mayoral election in Boston. Prominent was televised forums and debates. The first televised debate of the campaign was held on June 29. All nine candidates participated. The League of Women Voters of Boston and the Boston Chamber of Commerce hosted another debate between Kiley, Flynn, Langone, Kearney, Finnegan and DiCara at Faneuil Hall. Gelber and Linger were excluded from the debate and King chose not to participate in protest of the decision to exclude two of the candidates.

=== Outcome ===
Flynn and King received the most votes in the preliminary election held on October 11 and moved on to the general election. Clear weather on the day of the primary election was seen as encouraging the relatively high turnout.

== General election ==
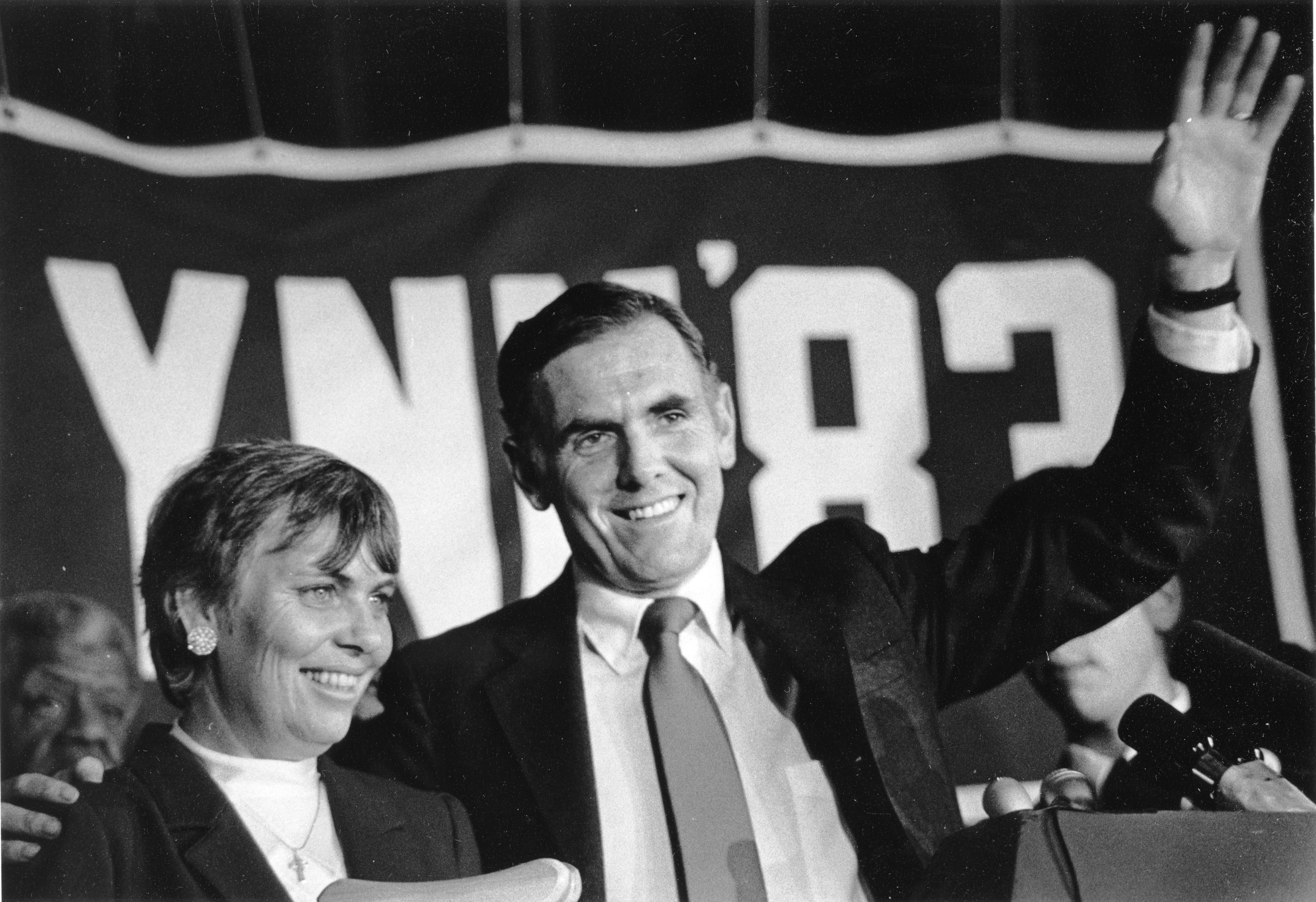
Raymond Flynn with his wife Kathy at his election night party

Both Flynn and King worked to build progressive coalitions, and both pledged to dedicate themselves to working across ethnic divides in the city. In the five weeks leading up to the general election, the two candidates held more than fifty local neighborhood debates. King was the first African American to be a candidate in a Boston mayoral general election. The campaign was largely peaceful. Only a handful of isolated incidents of racial violence occurred during the campaign. King secured the African American vote by wide margins and significant support among many other ethnic groups, even winning 20% of the white vote. However, Flynn benefited from being an Irish-Catholic with roots in South Boston. Flynn won the general election, 65%–35%.

The respectful, and even cordial, tone of the campaign between Flynn and King is regarded to have had a healing effect on the city of Boston in regards to race relations. The tone of the election was seen as dampening the racial tensions that had been heightened over the decade prior during the Boston desegregation busing crisis.

== Campaign finance ==
In the primary, Finnigan had the best-funded campaign. He raised $800,000 in campaign contributions, four times as much as any other of the leading candidates did in the primary.

Flynn's campaign received no real financial support from major sectors of the city's business community. Flynn had outright refused to accept campaign donations from developers with projects pending before city agencies, or lawyers of such developers. Both the Flynn and King had low-expenditure campaigns compared to the nearly $2 million campaign that outgoing mayor Kevin White and the political machine supporting him had spent on his candidacies in the 1975 and 1979 mayoral elections. Flynn's campaign spend roughly $400,000, while King's spent less than $350,000. Dudly Clendinen wrote that Flynn had worked to establish himself as a champion of the poor and elderly and to appeal across ethnic lines to ethnic minority voters.

== Results ==
Candidates	Preliminary Election		General Election	
Candidates	Votes	%	Votes	%
Raymond Flynn	48,118	28.86	128,578	65.07
Mel King	47,848	28.70	69,015	34.93
David Finnegan	41,657	24.99		
Lawrence DiCara	15,148	9.09		
Dennis J. Kearney	10,992	6.59		
Frederick C. Langone	2,262	1.36		
Bob Kiley	316	0.19		
Michael Gelber	207	0.12		
Eloise Linger	168	0.10		

== See also ==
- List of mayors of Boston, Massachusetts
