= Dennis J. Kearney =

American politician

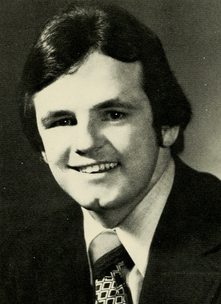

Member of the Massachusetts House of Representatives from the 2nd Suffolk District
- In office 1975–1977
- Preceded by: Anthony Scalli
- Succeeded by: Richard Voke

Suffolk County Sheriff
- In office 1977–1986
- Preceded by: Thomas Eisenstadt
- Succeeded by: Robert Rufo

Personal details
- Born: September 25, 1949 (age 77) Chelsea, Massachusetts
- Party: Democratic
- Education: Boston Latin School; Harvard College; Harvard Kennedy School; Suffolk University Law School
- Occupation: Attorney; Politician

Dennis J. Kearney (born September 25, 1949, in Chelsea, Massachusetts) is an American attorney and politician who served as a Massachusetts state representative and Sheriff of Suffolk County. He finished sixth in the 1983 Boston mayoral election with 7% of the vote. He is currently the President of the law firm Kearney, Donovan & McGee, P.C.
