= 1979 Boston mayoral election =

Election in Massachusetts, United States

- November 6, 1979
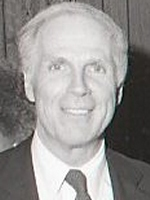

Candidate	Kevin White	Joseph F. Timilty
Party	Nonpartisan	Nonpartisan
Popular vote	78,048	64,269
Percentage	54.82%	45.14%
- Results by ward White: 50–60% 60–70% 70–80% Timilty: 50–60% 70–80%
Mayor before election
Kevin White
Elected mayor
Kevin White

The Boston mayoral election of 1979 occurred on Tuesday, November 6, 1979, between Mayor Kevin White and state senator Joseph F. Timilty. This was the second election in a row between White and Timilty. White once again defeated Timilty and was elected to a fourth term.

The nonpartisan municipal preliminary election was held on September 25, 1979.

== Candidates ==
- Joseph F. Timilty, member of the Massachusetts Senate since 1972. Member of the Boston City Council from 1967 to 1971.
- Kevin White, Mayor of Boston since 1968, Massachusetts Secretary of the Commonwealth from 1961 to 1967.

=== Candidates eliminated in preliminary ===
- Luis F. Castro, member of the Socialist Workers Party.
- David Finnegan, member of the Boston School Committee since 1975.
- Mel King, Member of the Massachusetts House of Representatives since 1973.
- Laurence R. Sherman, member of the U.S. Labor Party.

== Results ==
Candidates	Preliminary election		General election	
Candidates	Votes	%	Votes	%
Kevin White (incumbent)	50,272	42.39	78,048	54.82
Joseph F. Timilty	33,026	27.85	64,269	45.14
Mel King	17,490	14.75		
David Finnegan	17,306	14.59		
Laurence R. Sherman	297	0.25		
Luis F. Castro	199	0.17		
write-ins	0	0.00	50	0.04
Total	118,590	100	142,367	100

== See also ==
- List of mayors of Boston, Massachusetts
