= Mayoral control of schools =

Governance model for American schools

Mayoral control of schools is governance over American schools based on the business model, in which the mayor of a city replaces an elected board of education (school board) with an appointed board. The mayor may also directly appoint the head of the school system, called the CEO, superintendent or chancellor. Also known as integrated governance, mayoral control of schools is in contrast to the structure it replaces: an elected board that governs schools independently from the formal influence of the mayor.

Mayors govern the school districts in two of the United States' three largest cities: Chicago (since 1995) and New York City (since 2002). Mayors also control various other medium-to-large districts as well, including District of Columbia Public Schools. According to a survey of school board members compiled for the National School Board Association, 96 percent of respondents report that membership on their board is determined by election. As of October 2011, evidence of existing or attempted mayoral control was found in about 20 major districts around the United States. Perhaps the most high-profile case of mayoral control is New York City where Michael Bloomberg won the right to appoint the head of schools in June 2002.

Despite limited reach, there are a plethora of mayoral controlled governance structures. In Chicago, the mayor appoints the CEO (superintendent) as well as the entire school board. In Washington, DC, the mayor has power to directly select the chancellor, who must be confirmed by the city council. All D.C. state board of education members are elected but the state board of education acts in a largely advisory capacity to the district education agency. New York's mayor also has the power to select the head of schools, in addition to appointing eight of thirteen school board members. In Boston, the mayor's powers extend only to appointing a committee from a list of nominees. It is this appointed board that is entrusted with the job of selecting a superintendent of schools.

== History of mayoral control of schools ==
According to scholar Deborah Land of Johns Hopkins University, the origins of a system in which lay individuals were given the authority to govern their local schools dates back more than 200 years. From the inception of school boards, there was skepticism about the ability of distant politicians to see and meet the needs of local neighborhoods when it came to education. As a result, boards of education were morphed over time to ensure maximum local control of schools. It was believed that separating governance of schools from state and local elected officials was the best way to realize the Progressive Era vision of schools protected from politics. The trend toward mayoral control represents a reversal of this trend, with arguments for and against discussed in a later section.

While mayoral control in some cities such as Jackson, Mississippi, has existed since the mid-20th century, most shifts from elected to appointed school boards took place after 1990. Starting in the 1990s, mayoral control was viewed by its supporters as a way to address the chronic underperformance and jumpstart reforms in medium to large urban districts. The first major urban district to move toward mayoral control of schools was Boston, where, in 1991, the Massachusetts governor and legislature approved a petition allowing the mayor to appoint a seven-member board, which then appointed a superintendent of schools. The latest high-profile urban district to move under mayoral control was Washington, DC, where Mayor Adrian Fenty won the right to select the chancellor of schools in 2007. The table below shows the school districts that are now under the governance of mayor-appointed boards and, in some cases, mayor-appointed heads of schools.

Location	School system	Mayoral control since	Notes
Jackson, Mississippi	Jackson Public School District	1950s	Pre-dates later trend.
Boston, Massachusetts	Boston Public Schools	1991	Mayor appoints seven-member school committee, which appoints superintendent.
Chicago, Illinois	Chicago Public Schools	1995	Mayor appoints seven-member Chicago Board of Education; appointees do not require approval of Chicago City Council.
Baltimore, Maryland	Baltimore City Public Schools	1997	Under a deal made between the city and the state in 1997, the mayor formerly jointly appointed school board members with the governor of Maryland. During this period, the mayor was required to gain the approval of the governor to fill vacancies and remove board members. The state legislature ultimately ended this arrangement, and in 2017 the mayor gained full control over city schools. A law passed in 2016, however, will add two elected commissioners to the Board, beginning in 2022.
Cleveland, Ohio	Cleveland Metropolitan School District	1998	Mayor appoints seven-member school board.
Philadelphia, Pennsylvania	School District of Philadelphia	2001	In 2001 takeover of the school district by the state, two members of the School Reform Commission are appointed by the mayor and three are appointed by the governor of Pennsylvania. Since July 2018, the School Reform Commission was disbanded and replaced with the Board of Education whose members are appointed by the Mayor of Philadelphia and approved by the Philadelphia City Council
New York City	New York City Department of Education	2002	The New York State Legislature conferred the mayor of New York City with full control over public schools in 2002. In 2009, legislation to reauthorize mayoral control of schools stalled in the New York State Senate and briefly caused control of schools to technically revert to the old Board of Education; however, legislation was soon passed to extend mayoral control. In 2017, mayoral control again briefly lapsed due to legislative negotiations; a bill ultimately extended mayoral control for another two years.
Providence, Rhode Island	Providence Public School District	2003	Mayor appoints nine-member school beard, but requires consent of city council.
District of Columbia	District of Columbia Public Schools	2007	In 2007, the Council of the District of Columbia removed power over city schools from an elected Board of Authority and gave it to a chancellor who is appointed by the mayor and confirmed by the Council.

Other locations have varying degrees of mayoral control over schools: in Oakland, California, three of the 10 members of the Oakland Unified School District board members are appointed by the mayor, and the other seven are elected. Mayoral control proposals have also been made in Albuquerque, New Mexico and Seattle.

Notably, not all attempts at achieving mayoral control have been successful. Mayor of Los Angeles Antonio Villaraigosa sought to bring the Los Angeles Unified School District under his management, but before the plan could be brought into effect in 2007, a court ruled that it violated the California Constitution. In Detroit in the late 1990s, a reform board appointed by the mayor and governor replaced the elected board of education in response to allegations of mismanagement. This reform was reversed in city referendum in 2005 which reinstated an elected school board.

== Arguments for mayoral control ==
Proponents of mayoral control point to two major reasons for shifting from an elected to appointed governance structure: the benefits of a single point of accountability and the power of sustained, aligned leadership. On the point of accountability, supporters of mayoral control point to the extremely low turnout for often off-cycle school board elections as evidence of the lack of school board accountability and relevance. Expounding on this point, Finn and Keegan point out that in districts under mayoral control, "there is now a single, publicly accountable official in charge, rather than nine wannabe mayors immobilizing the school system with their petty squabbles, power grabs, and turf protecting. If citizens are unhappy with the schools, they can now vote the mayor out of office. This does not eliminate democratic control over the schools; it rechannels—and strengthens—it". Former appointed CEO of the mayoral controlled Chicago Public Schools and U.S. Education Secretary Arne Duncan has made his support for mayoral control of schools clear, offering his help to mayors who push to gain sole leadership of the schools within their cities. His support is also rooted in a belief that one point of accountability—the mayor—is far more effective than accountability spread across an elected board of education model.

The second major rationale used to support mayoral control is the power of sustained, aligned leadership. The average tenure of urban superintendents is less than four years—an unfortunate consequence of the frequent turnover in board membership and the shifting winds of local interests. In cities where the mayors provide job stability for superintendents and focus the energy of the public and private sectors of a city on designated education priorities, the theory goes that more will be accomplished in areas ranging from improving student achievement to ensuring sound fiscal management. In Boston, for instance, it is reported that mayoral control "engendered continuity in leadership and a new focus on learning".

== Arguments against mayoral control ==
Opponents of mayoral control typically cite two major issues with the shift. Most importantly, mayoral control represents an affront to democratic, public participation in school governance. Many worry that taking popular elections of school board members out of the school governance formula prevents local neighborhoods from having any say in how their interests are represented. As Hess admits, "some voices are likely to be silenced or marginalized under an appointed board". A related complaint focuses on the lack of transparency that accompanies appointed school boards. Comparing appointed school boards to the board malfeasance in private sector companies such as Enron points to the danger of having a single-minded board take control of any entity.

Overall, the question of whether to elect or appoint boards of education requires a thoughtful consideration of the "appropriate balance" between responsiveness and responsibility.

== Impact of mayoral control on student outcomes ==
Perhaps the most important piece of evidence in the debate between the proponents and opponents of mayoral control is whether mayoral control has measurable impacts on student achievement. After collecting and analyzing the research on school board effectiveness produced over the past twenty-five years, scholar Deborah Land concluded that there is "not yet convincing evidence that appointment of school board members produces…greater academic achievement." Similarly, while unwilling to dismiss the connection between strong mayoral involvement and student achievement outright, researchers at the Institute on Education Law and Policy at Rutgers University— Newark "were unable to establish conclusively that the change in governance had any causal relationship to improved performance, or that, using nationally normed test data, our [mayoral controlled] cities had greater improvements than anywhere else". Additionally, an analysis of top-down market-based reform efforts in three mayoral controlled cities, Chicago, New York City and Washington DC, indicate the efforts "deliver few benefits, often harm the students they purport to help, and divert attention from a set of other, less visible policies with more promise to weaken the link between poverty and low educational attainment."

Alternatively, a 2013 study by researchers at the Center for American Progress found that, of the eleven districts governed by some degree of mayoral leadership, five made substantial improvement in narrowing the student achievement gap, and four others showed progress on some measures. That same study found that mayoral control in New York City had improved the performance of African American and Latino students in fourth and eighth grade by between 1 and 3 percent annually.
