= Boston School Committee =

The Boston School Committee serves as the school board for Boston Public Schools.

== Precursors ==
In 1647, the Massachusetts General Court passed a law requiring the establishment of schools, it dictated that responsibility for the schools would be granted to "no existing body of officials but charged the Town as a whole with this important duty." Until 1789, various methods were used to oversee the city's schools without a formal school board. Records from between 1644 and 1689 indicate that, lacking an official school board, Boston had the Boston Board of Selectmen oversee school matters. In 1709, on its own initiative, the city of Boston opted to, "nominate and appoint a certain number of gentlemen, of liberal education, together with some of the Reverend Ministers of the Town to be Inspectors of the School." The school inspectors would pay annual visits to the town's schools. In 1712, the town voted to establish a committee to inspect, "the free writing schools which are supported at the Town's charge." In 1721, the town voted that its selectmen others appointed by the selectmen would serve as, "Inspectors of the Gramer and Wrighting Schools" for the next year.

== History ==
=== 1789–1822 ===
In 1789, the Massachusetts General Court granted the authority to "trust to appoint School Committees for the control of the Schools". Under this, Boston's public schools would be administered by a committee with twenty-one members. Membership consisted of nine selectmen plus member that would represent each of the city's twelve wards. In this incarnation, the board opted to divide itself into a number of committees, including a visiting committee, committee to fill vacancies in teaching staff, and an examining committee. October 20, 1789 the members of the first School Committee for Boston were selected and authorized "to exercise all the Powers relating to the Schools and School Masters, which the Selectmen or such Committees are authorized by the Laws of this Commonwealth on the Votes of this Town to exercise."

=== 1822–1992 ===
In 1822, when Boston incorporated as a city and adopted the first Boston City Charter, it reorganized the composition of the committee so that its 21 members would consist of the mayor of Boston, eight members of the Boston Board of Aldermen, and a member each to represent the city's twelve wards. In 1835, the charter was amended to expand the committee to twenty-six members, consisting of the mayor, the president of the Boston Common Council, and two members from each of the city's twelve wards.

In 1851, the committee appointed the city's first school superintendent, a position that lacked significant executive power.

An 1854 revision to the City Charter expanded the committee to 74 members, consisting of the mayor, president of the common council, and six members from each of the city's twelve wards. By 1875, with the annexation of Roxbury, Charlestown, Dorchester, West Roxbury, and Brighton leading to an increase in the number of wards in the city, the committee subsequently grew to have 116 members. Later that year, a change to the City Charter shrunk the committee down to 25 members, consisting of 24 member elected at-large to staggered terms, as well as the mayor as an ex-officio member.

Also in 1875, the committee established a Board of Supervisors to administer the schools on its behalf. The committee consisted of the superintendent and six school supervisors.

In 1885, the City Charter was amended to shrink the committee to 24 members by removing the mayor from serving as an ex-officio member.

In 1905, the School Committee was decreased to five members, each elected in staggered years to four-year terms. Committee members were not given compensation for their work. In 1924, the City Charter was amended to enshrine that the school board would only have five members.After a referendum was passed by Boston voters 1949, the committee's members' terms were decreased beginning in 1952 to two years in length, with the members being elected at-large.

In 1981, the city's voters passed a referendum expanding the Committee to thirteen members, with nine representing electoral districts and four being at-large. Terms remained two-years in length

=== 1992–present: mayoral-appointed committee ===
In 1989, Boston voters were presented with a non-binding ballot question on whether the city should adopt a mayoral appointed Committee form which would see the committee be shrunk to seven-members, all of whom would be named by the mayor from a list of Boston residents put form by a nominating panel, with their appointments subject to City Council confirmation. A plurality of 37.3% of voters voted in favor of the question, with 36.2% of voters voting against it. After this, in 1991, a home rule petition to establish an appointed School Committee was approved by the mayor and City council, and then passed into law upon approval of the Boston General Court and the governor of Massachusetts. The first appointed Committee took office in January 1992.

Mayor Raymond Flynn had spearheaded the effort to bring mayoral control of schools. Before this change, the elected school board had come to be regarded as fractious. However, by 1993, little over a year since the appointed board had taken office, disorder had already arisen on the appointed board, and Black civic organizers in the city were pushing to revert to an elected school board. Despite having advocated for this change, as Mayor Flynn was preparing to leave office in 1993, he questioned whether the change had been a good decision, conceding that it had disenfranchised the input of voters in shaping the school board, and had upset many communities of color in the city. In July 1993, Flynn remarked,

Let me acknowledge that taking the right to vote away from people is not a pleasant thing for me. It's a big issue in the minority community. I know it. I still hear it...and it's a very valid concern.
