= 2021 Boston City Council election =

- November 2, 2021

13 seats on the Boston City Council 7 seats needed for a majority
Party	Democratic
Last election	13
- Composition of the Boston City Council by political party (Note: Officially nonpartisan)
Incumbent President of the City Council
Matt O'Malley
Nonpartisan

The 2021 Boston City Council election was held on November 2, 2021. All thirteen councillors from the nine districts and four councillors at-large were up for election. Elections in Boston are officially nonpartisan.

Councillors Andrea Campbell, Annissa Essaibi George, Kim Janey, and Michelle Wu ran in the mayoral election, while Matt O'Malley did not seek re-election. Councillors Ricardo Arroyo, Frank Baker, Kenzie Bok, Liz Breadon, Lydia Edwards, Michael F. Flaherty, Ed Flynn, and Julia Mejia ran for re-election; all eight were successful. Five new members were elected to the council; two at-large and three from districts (4, 6, and 7).

== Background ==
Marty Walsh was elected to the mayoralty of Boston, Massachusetts, in the 2013 and 2017 elections. On January 7, 2021, President-elect Joe Biden announced that he would select Walsh to serve as the United States Secretary of Labor. Walsh resigned as mayor on March 22, after being confirmed as Secretary of Labor, and was replaced as acting-mayor by Kim Janey, who also served as president of the Boston City Council.

The city council voted to move the primary election date from September 21 to September 14, in order to allow mail-in voting ballots for the general election an additional week of distribution time, which was approved by Mayor Janey.

== Incumbent status ==
The council members at the time of both the preliminary election and general election are listed below. The table further indicates if each incumbent ran for re-election, and if so, whether they were re-elected or not.

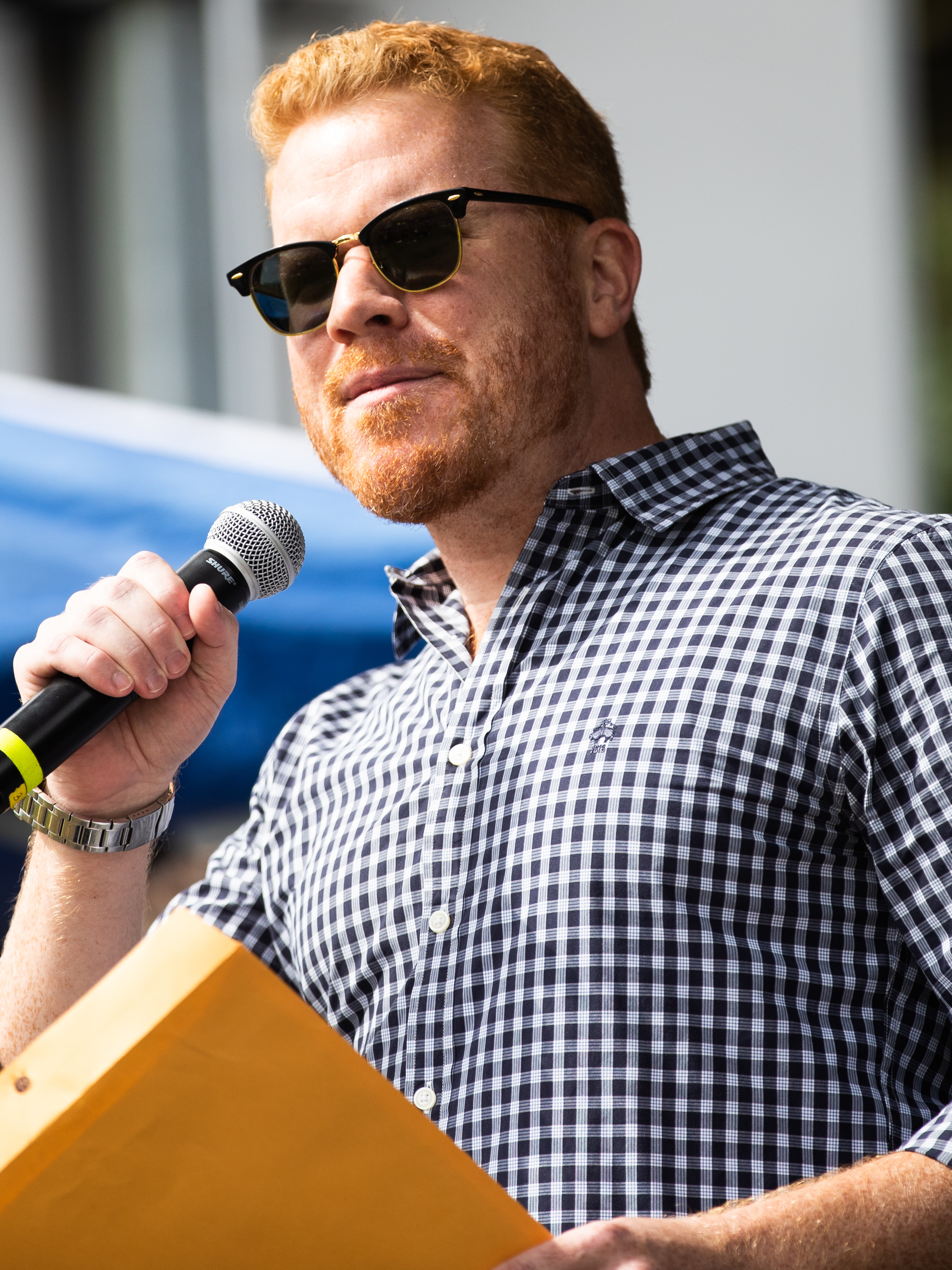
Matt O'Malley, acting council president at the time of the election

District	Name	Entered office	Ran	Result
At-large	Annissa Essaibi George	January 2016	No	Defeated in mayoral election
At-large	Michael F. Flaherty	January 2014	Yes	Re-elected
At-large	Julia Mejia	January 2020	Yes	Re-elected
At-large	Michelle Wu	January 2014	No	Elected mayor of Boston
1	Lydia Edwards	January 2018	Yes	Re-elected
2	Ed Flynn	January 2018	Yes	Re-elected
3	Frank Baker	January 2012	Yes	Re-elected
4	Andrea Campbell	January 2016	No	Defeated in mayoral election
5	Ricardo Arroyo	January 2020	Yes	Re-elected
6	Matt O'Malley ‡	November 2010	No	—
7	Kim Janey †	January 2018	No	Defeated in mayoral election
8	Kenzie Bok	January 2020	Yes	Re-elected
9	Liz Breadon	January 2020	Yes	Re-elected

† City council president and acting mayor of Boston
‡ Acting city council president

== Campaign ==
=== At-large ===
Two of the four incumbents did not seek re-election. Michelle Wu, who joined the city council in 2014, announced on September 15, 2020, that she would run in the mayoral election. Annissa Essaibi George, who joined the city council in 2016, announced on January 27, 2021, that she would run in the mayoral election. Incumbent councillors Michael F. Flaherty, who joined the city council in 2014, and Julia Mejia, who won election to the city council by one vote in the 2019 election, ran for reelection.

Other candidates in the election included: Althea Garrison, the first openly transgender person to serve in a state legislature and former member of the city council; Ruthzee Louijeune, a lawyer who worked as senior counsel for Senator Elizabeth Warren's presidential and senatorial campaigns; Erin Murphy, a former teacher in the Boston Public Schools; Alex Gray, a policy analyst; and Nick Vance, a political action co-chair of the NAACP in Boston.

The top eight vote-getters in the primary election advanced to the general election.

2021 Boston City Council at-large election
Candidate	Primary election		General election	
Candidate	Votes	%	Votes	%
Michael F. Flaherty (incumbent)	41,509	15.0	62,603	17.4
Julia Mejia (incumbent)	38,919	14.1	62,058	17.3
Ruthzee Louijeune	33,546	12.1	54,898	15.3
Erin Murphy	22,938	8.3	43,076	12.0
David Halbert	17,012	6.1	42,765	11.9
Carla Monteiro	18,911	6.8	39,876	11.1
Bridget Nee-Walsh	15,191	5.5	27,591	7.7
Althea Garrison	16,906	6.1	25,078	7.0
Kelly Bates	12,787	4.6		
Alexander Gray	11,320	4.1		
Jon Spillane	11,217	4.1		
Said Abdikarim	7,767	2.8		
Domingos DaRosa	7,011	2.5		
Donnie Palmer Jr.	6,861	2.5		
Roy Owens Sr.	5,265	1.9		
James Colimon	4,693	1.7		
Nick Vance	3,968	1.4		
Write-ins	873	0.3	1,350	0.4
Total	276,694	100	359,294	100

=== 1st district ===
Councillor Lydia Edwards, who was first elected to the city council in 2017, announced that she would run for reelection and launched her campaign on February 26, 2021, at a virtual event. Edwards was unopposed.

Candidates	General election	
Candidates	Votes	%
Lydia Edwards	10,558	97.3
Write-in	296	2.7
Total	10,854	100

=== 2nd district ===
Councillor Ed Flynn filed to run for reelection. He ran unopposed.

Candidates	General election	
Candidates	Votes	%
Ed Flynn	15,029	98.3
Write-in	257	1.7
Total	15,286	100

=== 3rd district ===
Councillor Frank Baker, who was first elected in 2011, announced that he would run for reelection after initially wanting to leave politics, but the COVID-19 pandemic changed his plans. Stephen McBride also ran in the election.

Candidates	General election	
Candidates	Votes	%
Frank Baker	8,518	62.9
Stephen McBride	4,972	36.7
Write-in	62	0.5
Total	13,552	100

=== 4th district ===
Councillor Andrea Campbell, who joined the city council in 2016, announced on September 24, 2020, that she would run for mayor. Evandro Carvalho, who served in the Massachusetts House of Representatives, announced on October 19 that he would run in the election. Leonard M. Lee Sr., a community organizer and member of the Boston Parks Commission, announced on February 3, 2021, that he would run in the election, stating that he was inspired to run after a nineteen-year-old was killed by the police outside his home. Other candidates included: William Dickerson III, a former city council aide; Nikkia Jean-Charles, who was inspired by Ayanna Pressley's campaign for a seat in the United States House of Representatives; and Joel Richards, a Boston Public School teacher and Boston Teachers Union activist. The top two vote-getters in the primary election advanced to the general election.

2021 Boston City Council District 4 election
Candidate	Primary election		General election	
Candidate	Votes	%	Votes	%
Brian Worrell	2,502	25.4	7,464	61.6
Evandro Carvalho	1,838	18.7	4,611	38.1
Joel Richards	1,320	13.4		
Josette Williams	1,173	11.9		
Leonard Lee Sr.	974	9.9		
William Dickerson III	948	9.6		
Deeqo Jibril	458	4.7		
Troy Smith	427	4.3		
Jacob Urena	185	1.9		
Write-ins	24	0.2	41	0.3
Total	9,849	100	12,116	100

=== 5th district ===
Councillor Ricardo Arroyo ran for reelection; John White also ran in the election.

Candidates	General election	
Candidates	Votes	%
Ricardo Arroyo	13,175	75.7
John White	4,127	23.7
Write-in	95	0.5
Total	17,397	100

=== 6th district ===
Kendra Hicks, an activist, announced in September 2020 that she would run against councilor Matt O'Malley. O'Malley, who joined the council in 2010, announced on December 2, 2020, that he would not seek reelection, so he could focus on his family. Two other candidates also ran for the seat; the top two vote-getters in the preliminary election advanced to the general election.

2021 Boston City Council District 6 election
Candidate	Primary election		General election	
Candidate	Votes	%	Votes	%
Kendra Hicks	9,265	49.9	13,987	55.8
Mary Tamer	8,024	43.2	11,017	43.9
Winnie Eke	1,196	6.4		
Write-ins	76	0.4	81	0.3
Total	18,561	100%	25,085	100

=== 7th district ===
Councillor Kim Janey, who was serving as acting-mayor and joined the council in 2018, announced on April 6, 2021, that she would run in the mayoral election. Candidates for the seat included Tania Fernandes Anderson, director of a non-profit organization, and Roy Owens Sr., a perennial candidate in council elections. The top two vote-getters in the preliminary election advanced to the general election.

2021 Boston City Council District 7 election
Candidate	Primary election		General election	
Candidate	Votes	%	Votes	%
Tania Fernandes Anderson	2,038	26.72	7,062	73.0
Roy Owens Sr.	1,300	17.05	2,562	26.5
Angelina Comacho	1,263	16.56		
Brandy Brooks	747	9.80		
Lorraine Wheeler	703	9.22		
Santiago Rivera	570	7.47		
Marisa Luse	552	7.24		
Joao DePina	410	5.38		
Write-ins	43	1.46	45	0.5
Total	7,626	100%	9,669	100

=== 8th district ===
Councillor Kenzie Bok, who joined the council in 2020, filed to run for re-election. She was unopposed.

Candidates	General election	
Candidates	Votes	%
Kenzie Bok	7,038	97.9
Write-in	151	2.1
Total	7,189	100

=== 9th district ===
Councillor Liz Breadon, who joined the council in 2020, ran for reelection against Michael Bianchi and entrepreneur Eric Porter. The top two vote-getters in the preliminary election advanced to the general election.

2021 Boston City Council District 9 election
Candidate	Primary election		General election	
Candidate	Votes	%	Votes	%
Liz Breadon	5,075	71.7	7,304	71.4
Michael Bianchi	977	13.8	2,844	27.8
Eric Porter	774	10.9		
Write-ins	253	4.5	88	0.9
Total	7,079	100%	10,236	100

== Campaign finance ==
Candidate	Campaign committee	
Candidate	COH	District
Frank Baker	$62,576.29	3rd
Kelly Bates	$61,737.76	At-large
Kenzie Bok	$44,227.40	8th
Lydia Edwards	$106,067.81	1st
Michael F. Flaherty	$252,075.21	At-large
Alexander Gray	$40,185.62	At-large
David Halbert	$63,828.57	At-large
Kendra Hicks	$76,456.51	6th
Julia Mejia	$101,899.46	At-large
Erin Murphy	$48,238.95	At-large
Ruthzee Louijeune	$129,825.33	At-large
Mary Tamer	$74,801.94	6th

== Endorsements ==
=== At-large district ===
Flaherty endorsements

Organizations

- Boston Teachers Union
- National Association of Government Employees
Gray endorsements

State officials

- Jay Gonzalez, Secretary of Administration and Finance of Massachusetts
- Tim Murray, 71st lieutenant governor of Massachusetts
Halbert endorsements

Federal officials

- Ayanna Pressley, United States congresswoman

Local officials

- Andrea Campbell, Boston city councilor from the 4th district and 2021 Boston mayoral candidate

Organizations

- SEIU 32BJ
Louijeune endorsements

Federal officials

- Ayanna Pressley, United States congresswoman
- Elizabeth Warren, member of the United States Senate from the Massachusetts

State officials

- Sonia Chang-Díaz, member of the Massachusetts Senate from the 2nd Suffolk district

Local officials

- Kenzie Bok, Boston city councilor from the 8th district
- Andrea Campbell, Boston city councilor from the 4th district and 2021 Boston mayoral candidate

Organizations

- Boston Teachers Union
- SEIU 32BJ
- Sierra Club
Mejia endorsements

Federal officials

- Ayanna Pressley, United States congresswoman

Local officials

- Andrea Campbell, Boston city councilor from the 4th district and 2021 Boston mayoral candidate

Organizations

- Boston Teachers Union
- SEIU 32BJ
Monteiro endorsements

Federal officials

- Ayanna Pressley, United States congresswoman

Local officials

- Andrea Campbell, Boston City Councilor from the 4th district and 2021 Boston mayoral candidate

Organizations

- SEIU 32BJ
Murphy endorsements

State officials

- Daniel J. Hunt, member of the Massachusetts House of Representatives from the 13th Suffolk district
Spillane endorsements

Local officials

- Kenzie Bok, Boston city councilor from the 8th district

=== 1st district ===
Edwards endorsements

Organizations

- SEIU 32BJ
- Sierra Club

=== 2nd district ===
Flynn endorsements

Organizations

- SEIU 32BJ

=== 4th district ===
Carvalho endorsements

Local officials

- Ricardo Arroyo, member of the Boston City Council from the 5th district
- Liz Miranda, state representative

Organizations

- The Bricklayers and Allied Craftsmen Local 3
- IBEW Local 103
- Laborers Local 151
- Laborers Local 223
- The Mass Retirees
- North Atlantic States Regional Council of Carpenters
- Pipefitters Local 537
- Plasterers' & Cement Masons Local 534
- The Roofers and Waterproofers Local 33
- UNITE HERE Local 26
- United Auto Workers Region 9A
Jibril endorsements

Organizations

- Massachusetts Voters for Animals
- Massachusetts Women's Political Caucus
Richards endorsements

Organizations

- Boston Teachers Union
- Democratic Socialists of America
- Grassroots Law Project
- Greater Boston Labor Council
- Mijente Boston Asamblea
- Right to the City Alliance
- Run for Something
- Sunrise Movement
Williams endorsements

Organizations

- Mass NOW PAC
Worrell endorsements

Local officials

- Andrea Campbell, Boston city councilor from the 4th district and 2021 Boston mayoral candidate

=== 5th district ===
Arroyo endorsements

Organizations

- SEIU 32BJ
- Sierra Club

=== 6th district ===
Kendra Hicks

Federal officials

- Ayanna Pressley, United States congresswoman

Local officials

- Ricardo Arroyo, member of the Boston City Council from the 5th district
- Julia Mejia, member of the Boston City Council from the at-large district

Organizations

- Boston Democratic Socialists of America
- SEIU 32BJ
- Sierra Club
Mary Tamer

Local officials

- Matt O'Malley, member of the Boston City Council from the 6th district

=== 7th district ===
Anderson Fernandes endorsements

Organizations

- SEIU 32BJ
Camacho endorsements

Local officials

- Suffolk County Sheriff Steven W. Tompkins
- State Representative Chynah Tyler

Organizations

- Boston Teachers Union
- Greater Boston Labor Council
- International Brotherhood of Electrical Workers, Local 2222
- Mass NOW
- Mass Voters for Animals
- Massachusetts Women’s Political Caucus
- North Atlantic States Regional Council of Carpenters
- Teamsters Union Local 25
- The United Food and Commercial Workers International Union 1445

=== 8th district ===
Bok endorsements

Organizations

- SEIU 32BJ
- Sierra Club

=== 9th district ===
Breadon endorsements

Organizations

- SEIU 32BJ

== Polling ==
=== At-large ===
==== General election ====
Poll source	Date(s) administered	Sample size (Note: Key: A – all adults RV – registered voters LV – likely voters V – unclear)	Margin of error	Michael Flaherty	Althea Garrison	David Halbert	Ruthzee Louijeune	Julia Mejia	Carla Monteiro	Erin Murphy	Bridget Nee-Walsh	Undecided
Emerson College	October 26–27, 2021	500 (LV)	± 4.3%	45%	20%	37%	47%	48%	34%	39%	24%	–
Suffolk University	October 15–17, 2021	500 (LV)	± 4.4%	30%	9%	16%	21%	29%	15%	18%	10%	35%
MassINC Polling Group	October 6–12, 2021	501 (LV)	± 4.9%	20%	8%	12%	16%	21%	13%	16%	11%	47%
