= Althea Garrison =

American politician (born 1940)

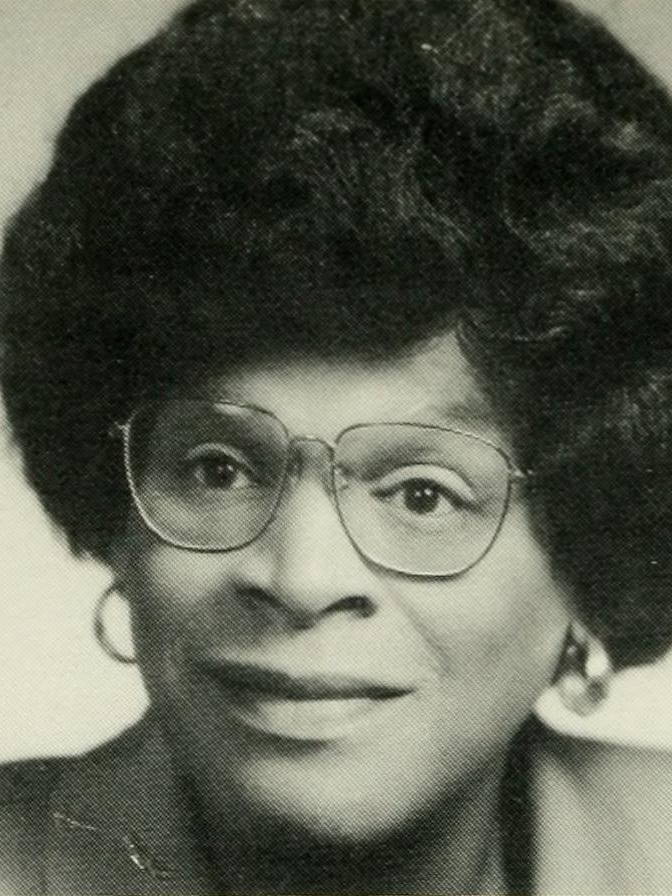
- official portrait, 1993

Member of the Boston City Council At-Large
- In office January 9, 2019 – January 6, 2020
- Preceded by: Ayanna Pressley
- Succeeded by: Julia Mejia

Member of the Massachusetts House of Representatives from the 5th Suffolk District
- In office 1993–1995
- Preceded by: Nelson Merced
- Succeeded by: Charlotte Golar Richie

Personal details
- Born: October 7, 1940 (age 86) Hahira, Georgia, U.S.
- Party: Independent (1988, 2000, 2008, 2012–2015; 2017–present); Democratic (1982–1986, 1998–1999, 2010–2012); Republican (1990–1996, 2002–2006, 2016–2017)
- Education: Newbury Junior College; Suffolk University; Lesley College
- Occupation: Human Resources; Politician

Althea Garrison (born October 7, 1940) is an American politician from Boston, Massachusetts who served a single term in the Massachusetts House of Representatives (1993–1995) and a partial term as an at-large councilor on the Boston City Council (2019–2020). She is considered the earliest transgender person known to have been elected to a state legislature in the United States. She was outed against her will by the Boston Herald while a member of the state legislature. While from then on it was public knowledge that Garrison is transgender, she did not publicly confirm this herself until 2023, long opting instead to refer to herself as a woman without any further elaboration.

Garrison is a perennial candidate, having been an unsuccessful candidate for political office at least 45 times. In her only successful campaign, she won election as a Republican to the Massachusetts House of Representatives from the 5th Suffolk district in 1992. She served one term from 1993 to 1995, losing her bid for reelection in 1994. Both before and after this, she has run for office many other times. Her campaigns have seen her run under different party affiliations, varyingly running as Republican, a Democrat, and an independent. Garrison, in the 2010s, described her political ideology as "independent conservative".

Garrison served as an at-large member of the Boston City Council from January 2019 to January 2020 due to a vacancy left by Ayanna Pressley's election to the United States House of Representatives. Because Garrison was the next-place finisher in the 2017 Boston City Council election, the rules of the Boston City Charter gave Garrison the right of first refusal to assume the seat vacated by Pressley. Garrison lost her bid for re-election in November 2019.

== Background ==
Born in Hahira, Georgia on October 7, 1940, Garrison was the youngest of seven children. She attended Hahira High School. She moved to Boston to attend beauty school, but went on to enroll in Newbury Junior College and received an associate degree. She later received a B.S. degree in administration from Suffolk University, an M.S. degree in management from Lesley College, and a certificate in special studies in administration and management from Harvard University.

Per her later recounting, Garrison began medically transitioning to affirm her gender identity as a woman during the 1960s. According to records in the Suffolk County Probate Court, Garrison petitioned for a name change to Althea Garrison in 1976. The petition stated that the name Althea Garrison "is consistent with petitioner's appearance and medical condition and is the name by which he [sic] will be known in the future."

Besides her one term in the Massachusetts House, Garrison has worked as a clerk in human resources for the Massachusetts state comptroller's office, where she used her vacation time to run for office. She served for four years on the Metropolitan Area Planning Council.

== Political career ==
=== Early years ===
In 1982 and 1986, Garrison ran unsuccessfully for the Massachusetts House of Representatives as a Democrat. She ran unsuccessfully for Boston City Council in 1983, 1985, 1987, 1989, and 1991. During the 1991 campaign, the Boston Herald noted that she had run for office nine times, although Garrison herself later described the race as her 10th or 11th bid for office. In the 1991 race, Garrison finished in third place in the District 7 preliminary election.

=== Massachusetts House (1993–1995) ===
In 1992, Garrison ran successfully for the 5th Suffolk district in the Massachusetts House, representing the Dorchester and Roxbury areas of Boston. Garrison's 1992 election to the legislature was made possible in part by the fact that she challenged some of the signatures that the then-incumbent representative, Nelson Merced, had submitted to qualify for the Democratic primary ballot. Her challenge was successful and meant that Garrison did not have to run against an incumbent in the general election. In the general election, Garrison defeated Democratic candidate Irene Roman, 2,451 votes to 2,014.

The fact that Garrison had been born male was not widely publicized until shortly after she was elected to the legislature. When the Boston Herald asked whether she was a man, Garrison denied it and ended the conversation when asked about her past, including her name change. The newspaper publicly outed her against her will.

In the Massachusetts House, Garrison consistently voted in favor of labor unions, resulting in her being endorsed for re-election by the Massachusetts AFL-CIO and eight unions. On many votes, she voted with the Democrats in the legislature rather than with the Republicans. However, she opposed same-sex marriage and abortion.

Garrison was defeated in her 1994 bid for re-election by Democratic nominee Charlotte Golar Richie by a margin of 2,108 votes to 1,718.

=== Unsuccessful bids for office ===
Garrison has run for office at least 46 times, only once winning election.

In 2019, former Boston City Councilor Lawrence DiCara noted that Garrison's many runs for office had afforded her a notable degree of name recognition among Bostonians, commenting "Althea has run for office many times and knows a lot of people."

List of offices sought (by year)
  - 1981: at-large seat in the 1981 Boston City Council election
  - 1982: 5th Suffolk district in the Massachusetts House as a Democratic candidate, finished third in the primary.
  - 1983: at-large seat in the 1983 Boston City Council election
  - 1985: at-large seat in the 1985 Boston City Council election
  - 1986: 5th Suffolk district in the Massachusetts House as a Democratic candidate, finished third in the primary.
  - 1987: at-large seat in the 1987 Boston City Council election
  - 1988: 5th Suffolk district in the Massachusetts House as an independent candidate, losing 63.6% to 35.7% to Nelson Merced.
  - 1989: at-large seat in the 1989 Boston City Council election
  - 1990: 5th Suffolk district in the Massachusetts House as a Republican candidate, losing 55.3% to 31.2% to Nelson Merced.
  - 1991: District 7 seat in the 1991 Boston City Council election
  - 1995: District 7 seat in the 1995 Boston City Council election
  - 1996: special election in the 1st Suffolk district in the Massachusetts Senate as a Republican candidate, losing 50.1% to 48.7% to Dick Czubinski in the primary.
  - 1996: 5th Suffolk district in the Massachusetts House as a Republican candidate, losing 54.9% to 45.1% to Charlotte Golar Richie.
  - 1997: District 7 seat in the 1997 Boston City Council election
  - 1998: 5th Suffolk district in the Massachusetts House as a Democratic candidate, losing 58.5% to 41.5% to Charlotte Golar Richie in the primary.
  - 1999: District 7 seat in the 1999 Boston City Council election
  - 1999: special election in the 5th Suffolk district in the Massachusetts House as a Democratic candidate, finishing third in the primary.
  - 2000: 5th Suffolk district in the Massachusetts House as an "Independent Progressive" candidate
  - 2001: 2001 Boston mayoral election
  - 2002: special election for the 1st Suffolk district in the Massachusetts Senate as a Republican
  - 2002: 1st Suffolk district in the Massachusetts Senate as a Republican candidate, losing in the primary 68.9% to 31.0% to Walter R. Campbell.
  - 2003: at-large seat in the 2003 Boston City Council election
  - 2005: at-large seat in the 2005 Boston City Council election
  - 2006: 5th Suffolk district in Massachusetts House as a Republican candidate
  - 2008: 1st Suffolk district in the Massachusetts Senate as an independent candidate, losing 79.0% to 25.0% to Jack Hart.
  - 2009: District 7 seat in the 2009 Boston City Council election
  - 2010: 5th Suffolk district in the Massachusetts House, finishing third in the Democratic primary
  - 2011: special election to fill a vacancy on the Boston City Council, District 7, eliminated in February preliminary election
  - 2011: District 7 seat in the 2011 Boston City Council election
  - 2012: 5th Suffolk district in the Massachusetts House as an independent candidate, losing 77.6% to 21.7% to Carlos Henriquez.
  - 2013: at-large seat in the 2013 Boston City Council election
  - 2014: 5th Suffolk district in the Massachusetts House as a Democratic candidate, losing in the primary 65.3% to 34.3% to Evandro Carvalho.
  - 2015: District 7 seat in the 2015 Boston City Council election
  - 2016: 5th Suffolk district in the Massachusetts House as an independent candidate, losing 83.9% to 15.6% to Evandro Carvalho.
  - 2017: at-large seat in the 2017 Boston City Council election (fifth place, top four elected)
  - 2018: 5th Suffolk district in the Massachusetts House as an independent candidate, losing 88.7% to 11% to Liz Miranda.
  - 2019: at-large seat in the 2019 Boston City Council election (seventh place, top four elected)
  - 2020: Register of Probate for Suffolk County, Massachusetts (third place)
  - 2021: at-large seat in the 2021 Boston City Council election
  - 2022: 5th Suffolk district in the Massachusetts House as a Democratic candidate (third place)
  - 2023: District 7 seat in the 2023 Boston City Council election

Offices sought (summary table)
Office	Elections run	Primary election campaigns	General election campaigns
Massachusetts House	19	15 campaigns overall, 5 successes 9 Democratic primaries 6 Republican primaries (5 successes)	11 campaigns, 1 victory (Republican nominee 6x, independent candidate 5x)
Massachusetts Senate	4	3 campaigns overall, 2 successes 2 Republican primaries	2 campaigns (Republican nominee 2x)
Boston mayor (nonpartisan)	1	1 campaign	—N/a
Boston City Council at-large council seat (nonpartisan)	11	10 campaigns, 6 successes (note: 2017 lacked a primary)	6 campaigns
Boston City Council district-constituency seat (nonpartisan)	9	8 campaigns, 2 successes (note: 2023 lacked a primary)	4 campaigns (3x on ballot, 1x as a write-in)
Suffolk County Register of Probate	1	—N/a	1 campaign (independent candidate 1x)
Republican State Committeewoman	1	—N/a	1 campaign

=== Boston City Council tenure (2019) ===
Garrison took the at-large seat of former councillor Ayanna Pressley on the Boston City Council, as Pressley left the City Council following her November 2018 election to Congress from Massachusetts's 7th congressional district. City rules require that vacancies for the at-large council seats are filled by the next-placed candidate in the previous election, which was Garrison in November 2017. Garrison was sworn in on January 9, 2019. Thus, Pressley's election gave Garrison the right of first refusal to assume Pressley's seat. Garrison claimed that she had, despite ideological differences, supported Pressley's campaign for the House of Representatives with the knowledge that, if Pressley were elected, Garrison would have the opportunity to be Pressley's City Council successor by virtue of her own finish in the previous city council election.

Garrison differed ideologically from the rest of the city councilors. She was noted to be the only strong conservative on the Boston City Council, and was a steadfast supporter of then-president Donald Trump and an ardent backer of the Boston Police Department. Around the time she joined the Boston City Council, Garrison described herself as an "independent conservative". She once explained, "I'm basically a conservative, but I also have some liberal ideas," and also explained, "I am a conservative, I am independent also," calling herself "a Black conservative." In a separate instance, she described herself and her voter base as being "moderate to conservative". She described her views as more closely aligned with the Republican Party than the Democratic Party. In September 2019, Sean Philip Cotter of the Boston Herald described "the Trump-supporting Althea Garrison" as being a source of annoyance for other members of the council, characterizing her a thorn in the side and a "conservative irritant" to a council that was left-leaning and progressive.

As a city councilor, Garrison supported reviving rent control in the city. In April 2019, she introduced a home rule petition for the city to seek state permission to reinstate rent control in the city. The petition was heavily criticized by many fellow city council members. She also voiced support for eviction control and price controls related to development. Garrison was supportive of the controversial "Operation Clean Sweep" effort by the police in August 2019 which saw 34 arrests in a two-day period in the so-called "Methadone Mile".

Garrison proposed a pro-police resolution (in support of the city's police and police union) in the aftermath of Super Happy Fun America's 2019 "Straight Pride Parade" and unrest that occurred related to it. The ordinance would have resolved to "unwavering support for the Boston Police Department and the Boston Police Patrolmen’s Association in their work of keeping Boston safe, and to unequivocally condemn any and all violence and disrespect towards Boston Police Officers. The ordinance was not voted on, with two councilors objecting to holding an immediate vote on it. Council President Michelle Wu, who offered her personal praise of the city's police, objected on the grounds that the resolution should first go through the council's committee hearing process. Councilor Lydia Edwards objected to the resolution on the grounds that she believed Garrison's intent in introducing it had not been to offer support the city's police (who Edwards praised as "amazing superheroes"), but rather to "support a political agenda".

Garrison opposed a proposal by Council President Wu that would have generated revenue by imposing fees for residential parking permits. While believing that planning and development needed to be "community based", Garrison also dismissed a proposal by Councilor Wu to abolish the current Boston Planning and Development Agency as merely being a ploy for reelection by Wu. In late-February 2019, Garrison proposed a measure to hold a hearing on the possibility of withholding city payments to the MBTA over the state of its service. At the time, the MBTA was proposing divisive fare increases. The measure was signed-onto by a majority of councilors. Council President Wu had introduced a similar measure the year prior.

Boston City Councilors can invite local religious leaders to deliver the City Council's convocation. In her first turn to select the convocation, Garrison invited pastor and right-wing perennial candidate Roy Owens. Owens is vocally anti-LGBT.

Garrison was a candidate for re-election in the November 2019 election, but finished seventh in the general election field of eight candidates. In that election, she had urged voters to unseat the three other sitting at-large city councilors (Michael F. Flaherty, Annissa Essaibi George, and Michelle Wu), and urged voters to "bullet vote" by casting a vote only for her in the at-large councilor column instead of voting for multiple (up to four) candidates.

In December 2019, the lame duck Garrison was one of only three city councilors to vote against a home rule petition requesting that the state allow the city to impose a real estate transfer tax.

== Personal life ==
Garrison is a transgender woman. After being outed by the Boston Herald in 1992, Garrison did not publicly discuss details of her gender identity until 2023, when she shared that she identifies as trans and had begun the process of socially and medically transitioning in the 1960s. Before 2023, despite it being public knowledge that she was transgender, Garrison avoided publicly discussing the topic of being a transgender individual, and had not publicly identified herself as being transgender; merely identifying herself as a woman, without any further elaboration.

Garrison is known not to embrace the use of technology, remarking in 2018, "I don't do computers, I don't do technology." She has also been perceived as adverse to granting the news media access to herself, with Quincy Walters of WBUR writing in a 2018 profile,

Garrison is suspicious of the media and rarely gives interviews. It's warranted. Back in 1992, a Boston Herald reporter confronted her with public records that indicated Garrison once went by a man's name. But Garrison has never identified as transgender. And some believe the public outing by the media contributed to her loss the next term.

== Electoral history ==
=== Massachusetts House ===
1982 Massachusetts House of Representatives 5th Suffolk district Democratic primary
Party	Candidate	Votes	%
Democratic	Richard J. Rouse	2,084	41.55
Democratic	Daniel M. Hart	2,041	40.69
Democratic	Althea Garrison	492	9.81
Democratic	Richard M. Rolak	294	5.86
Democratic	Thomas R. Roffey	35	0.70
Write-in	Other	70	1.40
Total votes		5,016	100

1986 Massachusetts House of Representatives 5th Suffolk district Democratic primary
Party	Candidate	Votes	%
Democratic	Richard J. Rouse (incumbent)	2,396	64.22
Democratic	Michael G. Sylva	853	22.86
Democratic	Althea Garrison	482	12.92
Total votes		3,731	100

1988 Massachusetts House of Representatives 5th Suffolk district election
Party	Candidate	Votes	%
Democratic	Nelson Merced	3,268	63.61
Independent	Althea Garrison	1,836	35.73
Write-in	Other	34	0.66
Total votes		5,138	100

1990 Massachusetts House of Representatives 5th Suffolk district Republican primary
Party	Candidate	Votes	%
Republican	Althea Garrison	28	100
Total votes		28	100

1990 Massachusetts House of Representatives 5th Suffolk district election
Party	Candidate	Votes	%
Democratic	Nelson Merced (incumbent)	2,215	55.28
Republican	Althea Garrison	1,249	31.17
Independent	Philip K. Robertson Jr.	543	13.55
Total votes		4,007	100

1992 Massachusetts House of Representatives 5th Suffolk district Republican primary
Party	Candidate	Votes	%
Republican	Althea Garrison	105	69.54
Republican	Gunnar Hexum	46	30.46
Total votes		151	100

1992 Massachusetts House of Representatives 5th Suffolk district election
Party	Candidate	Votes	%
Republican	Althea Garrison	2,479	54.91
Democratic	Irene L. Roman	2,031	44.98
Write-in	Other	5	0.11
Total votes		4,515	100

1994 Massachusetts House of Representatives 5th Suffolk district Republican primary
Party	Candidate	Votes	%
Republican	Althea Garrison	135	100
Total votes		135	100

1994 Massachusetts House of Representatives 5th Suffolk election
Party	Candidate	Votes	%
Democratic	Charlotte Golar Richie	2,101	54.94
Republican	Althea Garrison (incumbent)	1,723	45.06
Total votes		3,824	100

1996 Massachusetts House of Representatives 5th Suffolk district Republican primary
Party	Candidate	Votes	%
Republican	Althea Garrison	68	100
Total votes		68	100

1996 Massachusetts House of Representatives 5th Suffolk election
Party	Candidate	Votes	%
Democratic	Charlotte Golar Richie (incumbent)	3,684	68.69
Republican	Althea Garrison	1,666	31.07
Write-in	Others	13	0.24
Total votes		5,363	100

1998 Massachusetts State House of Representatives 5th Suffolk district Democratic primary
Party	Candidate	Votes	%
Democratic	Charlotte Golar Richie (incumbent)	1,218	58.47
Democratic	Althea Garrison	865	41.53
Total votes		2,083	100

1999 Massachusetts State House of Representatives 5th Suffolk district special election Democratic primary
Party	Candidate	Votes	%
Democratic	Marie St. Fleur	1,009	57.99
Democratic	Barry Lawton	361	20.75
Democratic	Althea Garrison	303	17.41
Democratic	Bernard Wheeler	67	3.85
Total votes		1,740	100

2000 Massachusetts State House of Representatives 5th Suffolk district election
Party	Candidate	Votes	%
Democratic	Marie St. Fleur (incumbent)	4,466	73.51
Independent	Althea Garrison	1,609	26.49
Total votes		6,075	100

2006 Massachusetts House of Representatives 5th Suffolk district Republican primary
Party	Candidate	Votes	%
Republican	Althea Garrison	65	91.55
Write-in	Others	6	8.45
Total votes		68	100

2006 Massachusetts House of Representatives 5th Suffolk election
Party	Candidate	Votes	%
Democratic	Marie St. Fleur (incumbent)	5,110	83.35
Republican	Althea Garrison	999	16.29
Write-in	Others	22	0.36
Total votes		6,131	100

2010 Massachusetts House of Representatives 5th Suffolk district Democratic primary
Party	Candidate	Votes	%
Democratic	Carlos Henriquez	719	35.42
Democratic	Barry Lawton	678	33.40
Democratic	Althea Garrison	400	19.70
Democratic	Roy A. Owens	226	11.13
Write-in	Others	7	0.35
Total votes		2,030	100

2012 Massachusetts House of Representatives 5th Suffolk district Democratic primary
Party	Candidate	Votes	%
Democratic	Carlos Henriquez (incumbent)	1,346	90.76
Democratic	Althea Garrison	63	4.25
Write-in	Others	74	4.99
Total votes		1,483	100

2012 Massachusetts House of Representatives 5th Suffolk election
Party	Candidate	Votes	%
Democratic	Carlos Henriquez (incumbent)	9,179	77.55
Independent	Althea Garrison	2,564	21.66
Write-in	Others	93	7.86
Total votes		11,836	100

2014 Massachusetts House of Representatives 5th Suffolk district special election Democratic primary
Party	Candidate	Votes	%
Democratic	Evandro Carvalho	961	49.08
Democratic	Karen A. Charles-Peterson	521	26.61
Democratic	Barry Lawton	190	9.70
Democratic	Jennifer Anne Johnson	151	7.71
Democratic	Roy A. Owens	89	4.55
Democratic	Althea Garrison	39	1.99
Write-in	Others	7	0.36
Total votes		1,958	100

2014 Massachusetts House of Representatives 5th Suffolk district special election
Party	Candidate	Votes	%
Democratic	Evandro Carvalho	739	91.24
Write-in	Althea Garrison	51	6.30
Write-in	Others	20	2.47
Total votes		810	100

2014 Massachusetts House of Representatives 5th Suffolk district Democratic primary
Party	Candidate	Votes	%
Democratic	Evandro Carvalho (incumbent)	1,637	65.30
Democratic	Althea Garrison	859	34.26
Write-in	Others	11	0.44
Total votes		2,507	100

2016 Massachusetts House of Representatives 5th Suffolk district Republican primary
Party	Candidate	Votes	%
Republican	Althea Garrison	54	96.43
Write-in	Others	2	3.57
Total votes		56	100

2016 Massachusetts House of Representatives 5th Suffolk election
Party	Candidate	Votes	%
Democratic	Evandro Carvalho (incumbent)	10,855	83.89
Republican	Althea Garrison	2,014	15.57
Write-in	Others	70	0.54
Total votes		12,939	100

2018 Massachusetts House of Representatives 5th Suffolk election
Party	Candidate	Votes	%
Democratic	Liz Miranda	8,527	88.70
Independent	Althea Garrison	1,053	10.95
Write-in	Others	33	0.34
Total votes		9,613	100

2022 Massachusetts House of Representatives 5th Suffolk Democratic primary
Party	Candidate	Votes	%
Democratic	Christopher J. Worrell	1,667	41.50
Democratic	Danielson Tavares	1,274	31.72
Democratic	Althea Garrison	874	21.76
Write-in	Others	13	0.32
Total votes		4,017	100

=== Massachusetts Senate ===
2002 Massachusetts Senate 1st Suffolk district special election Republican primary
Party	Candidate	Votes	%
Republican	Althea Garrison	128	98.46
Write-in	Other	2	0.15
Total votes		130	100

2002 Massachusetts Senate 1st Suffolk district special election
Party	Candidate	Votes	%
Democratic	Jack Hart	4,632	95.47
Republican	Althea Garrison	217	4.47
Write-in	Other	3	0.06
Total votes		4,852	100

2002 Massachusetts Senate 1st Suffolk district Republican primary
Party	Candidate	Votes	%
Republican	Walter R. Campbell	820	68.91
Republican	Althea Garrison	369	31.01
Write-in	Other	1	0.08
Total votes		1,190	100

2008 Massachusetts Senate 1st Suffolk district Republican primary
Party	Candidate	Votes	%
Write-in	Althea Garrison	1	0.89
Write-in	Other	111	99.11
Total votes		112	100

2008 Massachusetts Senate 1st Suffolk district election
Party	Candidate	Votes	%
Democratic	Jack Hart (incumbent)	9,355	98.21
Republican	Althea Garrison	23	0.24
Write-in	Other	148	1.55
Total votes		9,526	100

=== Boston mayor ===
2001 Boston mayoral election
Candidates	Preliminary Election		General Election	
Candidates	Votes	%	Votes	%
Thomas Menino (incumbent)	31,715	73.37	68,011	76.06
Peggy Davis-Mullen	9,958	23.04	21,393	23.93
Althea Garrison	1,552	3.59		

=== Boston City Council ===
1981 Boston City Council election
Candidates	Preliminary election		General election	
Candidates	Votes	%	Votes	%
Raymond Flynn (incumbent)	31,898	7.77	53,136	9.54
Christopher A. Iannella (incumbent)	25,462	6.20	44,621	8.01
Dapper O'Neil (incumbent)	24,240	5.91	40,474	7.27
Frederick C. Langone (incumbent)	23,000	5.60	39,780	7.14
Joseph M. Tierney (incumbent)	17,649	4.30	35,185	6.32
Michael J. McCormack	14,178	3.45	33,861	6.08
Terence P. McDermott	11,981	2.92	31,707	5.69
Maura Hennigan	14,325	3.49	31,637	5.68
Bruce Bolling	15,273	3.72	30,672	5.51
James M. Kelly	14,941	3.64	30,079	5.40
Patrick F. McDonough (incumbent)	17,165	4.18	29,591	5.31
Edmund McNamara	12,007	2.93	29,301	5.26
David Scondras	11,616	2.83	28,571	5.13
Charles Yancey	12,378	3.02	27,007	4.85
Francis X. Coppinger	11,034	2.69	21,675	3.89
Craig Lankhorst	10,301	2.51	20,769	3.73
Pamela J. Gilman	10,070	2.45	14,776	2.65
Gerard P. McHale	10,407	2.54	14,173	2.54
Joseph W. Casper	9,906	2.41		
Frederick T. Scopa	9,444	2.30		
John F. Melia	8,788	2.14		
Stephen G. Michaels	8,325	2.03		
Brian Hickey	8,222	2.00		
John P. Grady	7,855	1.91		
Richard B. Hogan	7,794	1.90		
Edward M. McCormack	7,610	1.85		
William G. Broderick	7,134	1.74		
Joseph E. Maher	6,269	1.53		
Maureen Craven Slade	5,759	1.40		
Althea Garrison	5,442	1.33		
Joseph T. Fitzpatrick	3,947	0.96		
David F. Burnes	3,784	0.92		
David Alan Mittell Jr.	3,660	0.89		
Francis X. Goode	3,227	0.79		
Thomas P. Casserly	3,005	0.73		
Warren I. Brown	3,001	0.73		
John S. MacDonald	2,881	0.70		
Edward J. DeSantis	2,688	0.65		
John B’Smith III	1,936	0.47		
John K. Rees	1,791	0.44		

1983 Boston City Council at-large election
Candidates	Preliminary Election		General Election	
Candidates	Votes	%	Votes	%
Michael J. McCormack (incumbent)	52,315	12.3%	87,143	16.0%
Christopher A. Iannella (incumbent)	66,647	15.6%	85,204	15.7%
Joseph M. Tierney (incumbent)	62,850	14.7%	82,600	15.2%
Dapper O'Neil (incumbent)	64,410	15.1%	79,086	14.6%
Terence P. McDermott (incumbent)	61,436	14.4%	77,096	14.2%
Jean Sullivan McKeigue	48,265	11.3%	73,064	13.4%
Willie Mae Allen	21,369	5.0%	32,556	6.0%
Althea Garrison	19,908	4.7%	26,564	4.9%
Joseph Mirisola	14,914	3.5%		
Leslie F. Payne	14,199	3.3%		

1985 Boston City Council at-large election
Candidates	Preliminary Election		General Election	
Candidates	Votes	%	Votes	%
Dapper O'Neil (incumbent)	22,792	19.1%	36,686	18.8%
Joseph M. Tierney (incumbent)	17,014	14.3%	34,427	17.6%
Christopher A. Iannella (incumbent)	19,183	16.1%	33,883	17.3%
Michael J. McCormack (incumbent)	17,329	14.5%	27,976	14.3%
Frederick C. Langone	16,900	14.2%	26,365	13.5%
Michael W. Kane	10,018	8.4%	17,175	8.8%
Willie Mae Allen	6268	5.3%	12,533	6.4%
Althea Garrison	3565	3.0%	6402	3.3%
Kenneth C. Davis	2130	1.8%		
John P. Scialdone	1588	1.3%		
Richard A. Black	972	0.8%		
Little L. Pittman	808	0.7%		
Edward P. Malik	723	0.6%		

1987 Boston City Council at-large election
Candidates	Preliminary Election		General Election	
Candidates	Votes	%	Votes	%
Dapper O'Neil (incumbent)	29,052	16.3%	47,817	17.0%
Christopher A. Iannella (incumbent)	23,906	13.4%	45,472	16.1%
Rosaria Salerno	19,346	10.8%	39,089	13.9%
Michael J. McCormack (incumbent)	16,793	9.4%	36,326	12.9%
Joseph W. Casper	15,694	8.8%	32,548	11.5%
Frederick C. Langone	19,521	10.9%	30,447	10.8%
Michael W. Kane	13,678	7.7%	27,573	9.8%
Stephen J. Murphy	13,309	7.4%	22,744	8.1%
Kevin A. McCluskey	11,431	6.4%		
Althea Garrison	6669	3.7%		
Edward T. Kelley	5123	2.9%		
David J. McKay	4198	2.3%		

1989 Boston City Council at-large election
Candidates	Preliminary Election		General Election	
Candidates	Votes	%	Votes	%
Dapper O'Neil (incumbent)	21,764	17.2%	40,106	17.6%
Christopher A. Iannella (incumbent)	20,142	15.9%	38,357	16.9%
Rosaria Salerno (incumbent)	19,478	15.4%	35,654	15.7%
Michael J. McCormack (incumbent)	19,073	15.1%	31,170	13.7%
John A. Nucci	14,646	11.6%	30,466	13.4%
John N. Flanagan	13,676	10.8%	22,359	9.8%
Joseph W. Casper	10,103	8.0%	18,069	7.9%
Althea Garrison	5042	4.0%	11,281	5.0%
Glenn Fiscus	2365	1.9%		

1991 Boston City Council district 7 election
Candidates	Preliminary Election		General Election	
Candidates	Votes	%	Votes	%
Anthony Crayton	836	18.7%	3129	57.5%
Roy A. Owens	974	21.8%	2314	42.5%
Althea Garrison	703	15.7%		
Ben Haith	691	15.4%		
James A. West	666	14.9%		
Hattie Dudley	395	8.8%		
Natalie E. Carithers	211	4.7%		

1995 Boston City Council district 7 election
Candidates	Preliminary Election		General Election	
Candidates	Votes	%	Votes	%
Gareth R. Saunders (incumbent)	1262	55.4%	2361	62.1%
Althea Garrison	553	24.3%	1441	37.9%
Roy A. Owens	254	11.2%		
Moses E. Wilson Jr.	209	9.2%		

1997 Boston City Council district 7 election
Candidates	Preliminary Election		General Election	
Candidates	Votes	%	Votes	%
Gareth R. Saunders (incumbent)	851	40.5%	2278	61.4%
Althea Garrison	360	17.1%	1430	38.6%
Roy A. Owens	349	16.6%		
Anthony Crayton	341	16.2%		
Robert L. Terrell	200	9.5%		

1999 Boston City Council district 7 election
Candidates	Preliminary Election		General Election	
Candidates	Votes	%	Votes	%
Chuck Turner	1153	33.9%	2419	58.4%
Tracy Litthcut	590	17.3%	1726	41.6%
Julio Henriquez	339	10.0%		
Roy A. Owens	314	9.2%		
Althea Garrison	282	8.3%		
Anthony Crayton	255	7.5%		
Hassan Ali Williams	122	3.6%		
Richard Masterson	115	3.4%		
Scotland Willis	70	2.1%		
Kenneth Yarbrough	65	1.9%		
Roger Garvin	51	1.5%		
Thelma Barros	47	1.4%		

2003 Boston City Council at-large election
Candidates	Preliminary Election		General Election	
Candidates	Votes	%	Votes	%
Michael F. Flaherty (incumbent)	20,307	18.21	36,387	18.33
Felix D. Arroyo (incumbent)	14,379	12.89	34,685	17.48
Maura Hennigan (incumbent)	15,916	14.27	33,596	16.93
Stephen J. Murphy (incumbent)	17,597	15.78	30,510	15.37
Patricia H. White	16,439	14.74	29,649	14.94
Matt O'Malley	7,025	6.30	12,929	6.51
Althea Garrison	5,050	4.53	10,524	5.30
Roy Owens	4,356	3.91	10,204	5.14
Jacquelyne Payne-Thompson	2,723	2.44		
Phyllis Yetman Igoe	1,940	1.74		
Edward Puglielli	1,705	1.53		
Laura Garza	1,604	1.44		
Arthur "Lucky" Craffey	1,594	1.43		
Joseph Anthony Ureneck	907	0.81		

2005 Boston City Council at-large election
Candidates	Preliminary Election		General Election	
Candidates	Votes	%	Votes	%
Michael F. Flaherty (incumbent)	17,828	13.90	49,220	17.58
Felix D. Arroyo (incumbent)	15,690	12.23	43,533	15.55
Sam Yoon	13,165	10.27	41,891	14.96
Stephen J. Murphy (incumbent)	14,094	10.99	35,553	12.70
John R. Connolly	14,287	11.14	31,629	11.30
Matt O'Malley	12,070	9.41	28,318	10.12
Patricia H. White	12,895	10.05	26,999	9.64
Edward M. Flynn	11,092	8.65	21,778	7.78
Althea Garrison	4824	3.76		
Kevin R. McCrea	3661	2.85		
Roy Owens	3622	2.82		
Laura Garza	1807	1.41		
Gregory Joseph O'Connell	1174	0.92		
Martin J. Hogan	1031	0.80		
Joseph Ready	675	0.53		
Joseph Ureneck	17†	0.01	133†	0.05
Gibran Rivera	17†	0.01		
all others	297	0.23	874	0.31

† write-in votes

2009 Boston City Council district 7 election
Candidates	Preliminary Election		General Election	
Candidates	Votes	%	Votes	%
Chuck Turner (incumbent)	3,648	52.57	5,521	59.83
Carlos Henriquez	1,659	23.91	3,644	39.49
Althea Garrison	995	14.34		
Roy Owens	610	8.79		

2011 Boston City Council district 7 special election
Candidate	Votes	%
Tito Jackson	2,829	81.98
Cornell Mills	557	16.14
Althea Garrison (write-in)	46	1.33
all others	19	0.55
Total votes	3,451	100

2011 Boston City Council district 7 election
Candidates	Preliminary Election		General Election	
Candidates	Votes	%	Votes	%
Tito Jackson (incumbent)	1,876	76.07	4,818	84.35
Sheneal Parker	273	11.07	799	13.99
Althea Garrison	216	8.76	47†	0.82
Roy Owens	85	3.45		
all others	16†	0.65	48†	0.84
Total	2,466	100	5,712	100

† write-in votes

2013 Boston City Council at-large election
Candidates	Preliminary Election		General Election	
Candidates	Votes	%	Votes	%
Ayanna Pressley (incumbent)	42,915	16.71	60,799	18.30
Michelle Wu	29,384	11.44	59,741	17.98
Michael F. Flaherty	39,904	15.54	55,104	16.59
Stephen J. Murphy (incumbent)	31,728	12.35	44,993	13.54
Annissa Essaibi George	12,244	4.77	30,538	9.19
Jeffrey Michael Ross	13,939	5.43	28,879	8.69
Martin J. Keogh	15,743	6.13	26,500	7.98
Jack F. Kelly III	11,909	4.64	23,967	7.22
Catherine M. O'Neill	10,952	4.26		
Althea Garrison	10,268	4.00		
Ramon Soto	9928	3.87		
Philip Arthur Frattaroli	5832	2.27		
Gareth R. Saunders	5363	2.09		
Christopher J. Conroy	3433	1.34		
Seamus M. Whelan	3118	1.21		
Francisco L. White	2745	1.07		
Douglas D. Wohn	2382	0.93		
Frank John Addivinola Jr.	2240	0.87		
Keith B. Kenyon	1950	0.76		
Jamarhl Crawford	21†	0.01		
all others	832	0.32	1658	0.50

† write-in votes

2015 Boston City Council district 7 election
Candidates	Preliminary Election		General Election	
Candidates	Votes	%	Votes	%
Tito Jackson (incumbent)	1409	66.40	2983	66.64
Charles L. Clemons Jr.	381	17.95	1444	32.26
Haywood Fennell Sr.	104	4.90		
Althea Garrison	98	4.62	16†	0.36
Roy Owens	74	3.49		
Kevin A. Dwire	34	1.60		
all others	22	1.04	33	0.74

† write-in votes

2017 Boston City Council at-large election
Candidate	Votes	%
Michelle Wu (incumbent)	65,040	24.47
Ayanna Pressley (incumbent)	57,520	21.64
Michael F. Flaherty (incumbent)	51,673	19.44
Annissa Essaibi George (incumbent)	45,564	17.14
Althea Garrison	18,253	6.87
Domingos DaRosa	11,647	4.38
William A. King	8,773	3.30
Pat Payaso	6,124	2.30
all others	1,230	0.46

2019 Boston at-large City Council election
Candidate	Primary election		General election	
Candidate	Votes	%	Votes	%
Michelle Wu (incumbent)	26,622	19.41	41,664	20.73
Annissa Essaibi George (incumbent)	18,993	13.85	34,109	16.97
Michael F. Flaherty (incumbent)	18,766	13.68	33,284	16.56
Julia Mejia	10,799	7.87	22,492	11.19
Alejandra Nicole St. Guillen	11,910	8.68	22,491	11.19
Erin J. Murphy	9,385	6.84	16,867	8.39
Althea Garrison (incumbent)	9,720	7.09	16,189	8.05
David Halbert	6,354	4.76	13,214	6.57
Martin Keogh	6,246	4.55		
Jeffrey Michael Ross	5,078	3.70		
Priscilla E. Flint-Banks	4,094	2.98		
Domingos DaRosa	2,840	2.07		
Michel Denis	2,108	1.54		
William A. King	1,809	1.32		
Herb Alexander Lozano	1,510	1.10		
all others	766	0.56	704	0.35

2021 Boston City Council at-large election
Candidate	Primary election		General election	
Candidate	Votes	%	Votes	%
Michael F. Flaherty (incumbent)	41,509	15.00	62,602	17.42
Julia Mejia (incumbent)	38,919	14.07	62,058	17.27
Ruthzee Louijeune	33,546	12.12	54,898	15.28
Erin J. Murphy	22,938	8.29	43,076	11.99
David Halbert	17,012	6.15	42,765	11.90
Carla B. Monteiro	18,911	6.83	39,876	11.10
Bridget M. Nee-Walsh	15,191	5.49	27,591	7.68
Althea Garrison	16,906	6.11	25,078	6.98
Kelly F. Bates	12787	4.62		
Alexander J. Gray	11,320	4.09		
Jon M. Spillane	11,217	4.05		
Said A. Abdikarim	7,767	2.81		
Domingos DaRosa	7,011	2.53		
Donnie Dionico Palmer Jr.	6,861	2.48		
Roy A. Owens Sr.	5,265	1.90		
James Rignald Colimon	4,693	1.70		
Nick Vance	3,968	1.43		
Write-ins	873	0.32	1,350	0.38

2023 Boston City Council district 7 election
Candidate	Votes	%
Tania Fernandes Anderson (incumbent)	3,710	70.36
Althea Garrison	1,500	28.45
Write-ins	63	1.19
Total votes	5,273	100

=== Suffolk County Register of Probate ===
2020 Suffolk County Register of Probate election
Party	Candidate	Votes	%
Democratic	Felix D. Arroyo (incumbent)	207,828	76.76
Independent	Melissa Tyler	31,043	11.47
Independent	Althea Garrison	30,303	11.19
Write-in	Other	1,565	0.58
Total votes		270,739	100

=== Republican State Committee Woman ===
1996 Massachusetts Republican State Committee Woman 1st Suffolk district election
Party	Candidate	Votes	%
Republican	Suzanne Ianella	1,140	63.58
Republican	Georgia B. Gibbons	324	18.07
Republican	Althea Garrison	323	18.02
Write-in	Others	6	0.34
Total votes		1,793	100

== See also ==
- Stacie Laughton, first out transgender person to be elected to state legislature (but resigned before being sworn in)
- Danica Roem, first out transgender person to be elected and serve in a state legislature
- List of transgender public officeholders in the United States

Political offices
Preceded by Nelson Merced	Member of the Massachusetts House of Representatives from the 5th Suffolk district 1993–1995	Succeeded by Charlotte Golar Richie
Preceded by Ayanna Pressley	Member At-Large of the Boston City Council; 2019–2020	Succeeded by Julia Mejia
