= Senator Miranda =

Senator Miranda may refer to:

- Catherine Miranda (born 1964), Arizona State Senate
- Liz Miranda (born 1981), Massachusetts State Senate
- Richard Miranda (politician) (born 1956), Arizona State Senate
