= 2017 Boston City Council election =

- November 7, 2017

Boston City Council elections were held on November 7, 2017. Nine seats in the Boston City Council (five district representatives and four at-large members) were contested in the general election, as the incumbents in districts 3, 4, 5, and 6 were unopposed. Four seats (districts 1, 2, 7, and 9) had also been contested in the preliminary election held on September 26, 2017.

== At-large ==
Councillors Michelle Wu, Ayanna Pressley, Michael F. Flaherty, and Annissa Essaibi George were re-elected.

Candidates	General election	
Candidates	Votes	%
Michelle Wu	65,040	24.47%
Ayanna Pressley	57,520	21.64%
Michael F. Flaherty	51,673	19.44%
Annissa Essaibi George	45,564	17.14%
Althea Garrison	18,253	6.87%
Domingos DaRosa	11,647	4.38%
William A. King	8,773	3.30%
Pat Payaso	6,124	2.30%
all others	1,230	0.46%

== District 1 ==
The seat formerly held by Salvatore LaMattina was won by Lydia Edwards. LaMattina had announced in April 2017 that he would not seek re-election.

Candidates	Preliminary election		General election	
Candidates	Votes	%	Votes	%
Lydia Edwards	3,547	45.95%	6,906	52.70%
Stephen Passacantilli	3,628	47.00%	6,812	47.17%
Margaret M. Farmer	522	6.76%		
all others	22	0.29%	17	0.13%

== District 2 ==
The seat formerly held by Bill Linehan was won by Edward M. Flynn, son of former mayor of Boston Raymond Flynn. Linehan had announced in February 2017 that he would not seek re-election.

Candidates	Preliminary election		General election	
Candidates	Votes	%	Votes	%
Edward M. Flynn	5,085	56.42%	7,474	51.61%
Michael S. Kelley	2,860	31.73%	6,958	48.05%
Corey G. Dinopoulos	504	5.59%		
Erica J. Tritta	183	2.03%		
Joseph F. Kebartas	161	1.79%		
Peter A. Lin-Marcus	124	1.38%		
Kora R. Vakil	72	0.80%		
all others	24	0.29%	27	0.35%

== District 3 ==
Councillor Frank Baker ran unopposed and was re-elected.

Candidates	General election	
Candidates	Votes	%
Frank Baker	8,385	97.12%
all others	249	2.88%

== District 4 ==
Councillor Andrea Campbell ran unopposed and was re-elected.

Candidates	General election	
Candidates	Votes	%
Andrea Campbell	8,027	98.64%
all others	111	1.36%

== District 5 ==
Councillor Timothy McCarthy ran unopposed and was re-elected.

Candidates	General election	
Candidates	Votes	%
Timothy McCarthy	9,870	97.60%
all others	243	2.40%

== District 6 ==
Councillor Matt O'Malley ran unopposed and was re-elected.

Candidates	General election	
Candidates	Votes	%
Matt O'Malley	6,658	97.75%
all others	153	2.25%

== District 7 ==
The seat formerly held by Tito Jackson (who lost in the Boston mayoral election) was won by Kim Janey.

Candidates	Preliminary election		General election	
Candidates	Votes	%	Votes	%
Kim Janey	1,534	25.00%	4,942	55.47%
Rufus J. Faulk	719	11.72%	3,856	43.28%
Deeqo M. Jibril	605	9.86%		
Domonique A. Williams	593	9.66%		
Charles Clemmons Muhammad	423	6.89%		
Roy Owens	370	6.03%	29†	0.33%
Jose Lopez	363	5.92%		
Brian S. Keith	348	5.67%		
Joao Gomes Depina	299	4.87%		
Hassan A. Williams	285	4.64%		
Carlos Henriquez	263	4.29%		
Angelina Magdalena Camacho	247	4.03%		
Steven A. Wise	64	1.04%		
all others	23	0.37%	83	0.93%

† write-in votes

== District 8 ==
Councillor Josh Zakim was re-elected.

Candidates	General election	
Candidates	Votes	%
Josh Zakim	4,000	67.06%
Kristen Mobilia	1,936	32.46%
all others	29	0.49%

== District 9 ==
Councillor Mark Ciommo was re-elected.

Candidates	Preliminary election		General election	
Candidates	Votes	%	Votes	%
Mark Ciommo	2,076	58.61%	4,680	61.30%
Brandon David Bowser	823	23.24%	2,913	38.15%
Alexander Bernhard Golonka	619	17.48%		
all others	24	0.68%	42	0.55%

== See also ==
- List of members of the Boston City Council
- 2017 Boston mayoral election
