= Annissa Essaibi George =

American politician

- Essaibi George in 2023

Member of the Boston City Council at-large
- In office January 4, 2016 – January 3, 2022
- Preceded by: Stephen J. Murphy
- Succeeded by: Ruthzee Louijeune

Personal details
- Born: Anissa Essaibi; December 12, 1973 (age 52) Boston, Massachusetts, U.S.
- Party: Democratic
- Education: Bentley College; Boston University (BA); University of Massachusetts, Boston (MEd)
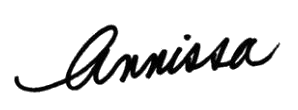
- Signature
- Website: Campaign website
- Essaibi George's voice Recorded February 2, 2018; first published February 7

Annissa Essaibi George (Note: Some sources use a hyphen in her name; Annissa Essaibi-George. However, neither her own website nor her profile page at Boston.gov use a hyphen; Annissa Essaibi George.) (born December 12, 1973) is an American politician who served as an at-large member of the Boston City Council. First elected in 2015, she served on the council from 2016 to 2022. She was a candidate in the 2021 Boston mayoral election. She placed second in the nonpartisan primary, but was defeated in the general election by fellow city councilor Michelle Wu. Since November 2022, Essaibi George has served as the president of the Board of Directors of the nonprofit organization Big Sister Boston.

Born and raised in Boston, Essaibi George began her career as a student services liaison at the Boston Private Industry Council. After receiving a master's in education, she later entered the field of education and worked as a social studies teacher at East Boston High School. A Democrat, Essaibi George entered electoral politics by running unsuccessfully for an at-large seat on the Boston City Council in 2013. Two years later, she won election to an at-large seat in the 2015 Boston City Council election. She was reelected to the Boston City Council in both 2017 and 2019.

In January 2021, Essaibi George announced her candidacy in that year's election for mayor of Boston. Her candidacy was considered centrist in comparison to that of the other leading candidates. She placed second in the election's nonpartisan primary, outperforming then-acting mayor Kim Janey and other candidates including Andrea Campbell and John Barros. She faced Michelle Wu in the general election, and was defeated by Wu by a landslide.

== Early life ==
Annissa Essaibi George was born on December 12, 1973, in Boston, Massachusetts. Her parents met while studying in Paris. Her mother was born to Polish parents in a displaced persons camp in Germany but grew up in Boston. Her father, Ezzeddine, was from Tunisia. They relocated to the United States in 1972, settling in the Dorchester neighborhood of Boston. Essaibi George and her three siblings were raised Catholic while her father was a practicing Muslim.

After graduating from Boston Technical High School (now the John D. O'Bryant School of Mathematics & Science), Essaibi George attended Bentley College, a business school in Waltham, Mass., for two years, before transferring to Boston University, where she was a political science major. While in college, she interned in the Washington, D.C., office of Max Baucus. After graduating from B.U., she worked as the student services liaison at the Boston Private Industry Council. She continued her education by earning a master's degree in education from the University of Massachusetts-Boston, later teaching social studies electives at East Boston High School from 2001 to 2014.

== Unsuccessful 2013 city council campaign ==
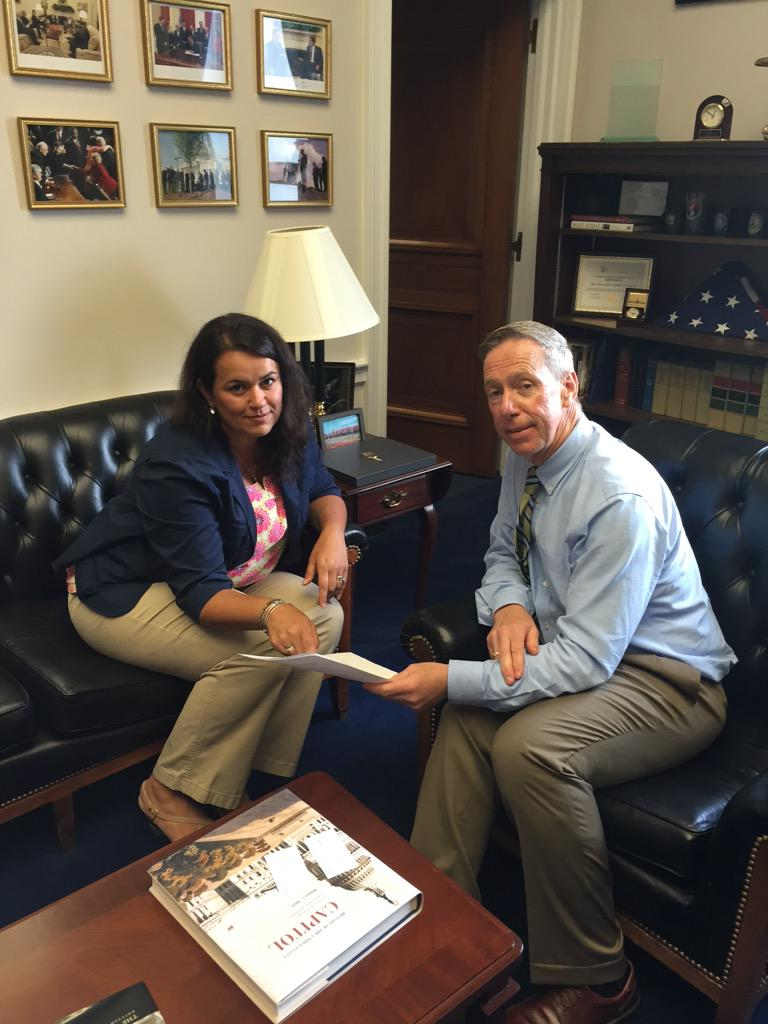
Essaibi George meeting with Congressman Stephen Lynch in 2015

Essaibi George is affiliated with the Democratic Party. She first ran unsuccessfully for Boston City Council in the 2013 election for at-large seats.

The editorial board of The Boston Globe opted not to endorse her 2013 candidacy, instead endorsing incumbent councilor Ayanna Pressley, former councilor Michael F. Flaherty, and first-time candidates Michelle Wu and Jack Kelly. The editorial board opined on her,

Essaibi-George has been an effective Dorchester neighborhood activist. She enjoys ample support from organized labor. But her all-or-nothing approach to issues suggest she would be a reflexive and potentially even divisive councilor.

== City council tenure ==
Essaibi George became an at-large member of the Boston City Council in January 2016 after she was elected in the 2015 election. She was re-elected in both November 2017 and November 2019.

While on the City Council, Essaibi George was considered an ally of then-Mayor Marty Walsh, whom she has known since childhood.

Essaibi George chaired committees, including both the Committee on Education and the Committee on Homelessness, Mental Health, and Recovery.

Essaibi George's successful 2015 campaign, which first elected her to the Boston City Council, focused on social services, including mental health counseling and services for the homeless. In 2016, she established the council's Homelessness, Mental Health, and Recovery committee. She was critical of Kim Janey's move in 2020, as city council president, to disestablish this committee. For several years, Essaibi George proposed ordinances requiring pharmacies to provide safe sharps waste disposal. An ordinance sponsored by Essaibi George that requires pharmacy chains with more than three locations in the city to do so was passed unanimously by the City Council in October 2020. Essaibi George also organized needle clean-up drives. In 2019, Essaibi George expressed her disapproval for the prospect of creating supervised consumption sites (in the mold of supervised injection sites) in response to drug use in the city. In 2019, Essaibi George advocated for the city to place a full-time social worker and a full-time nurse in every public school. The city, ultimately, implemented this, with Martin J. Valencia of The Boston Globe later attributing this, in part, to her advocacy on the matter.

In 2016, Essaibi George pressed the city to lessen the amount of geese in city parks, expressing concern over the amount of feces geese were leaving.

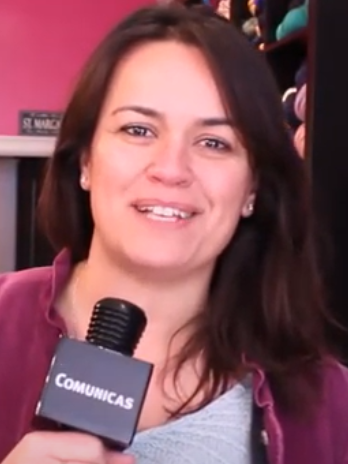
Essaibi George in 2018

Essaibi George was an early supporter of Ayanna Pressley's successful 2018 Democratic primary election challenge to incumbent U.S. Congressman Mike Capuano. During the Democratic primary election of Massachusetts' 2020 United States Senate election, Essaibi George endorsed incumbent Ed Markey's ultimately successful reelection campaign over the candidacy of challenger Joe Kennedy III.

Essaibi George was involved in efforts to have the city hire additional licensed social workers to work alongside first responders in addressing 911 calls related to mental health problems and similar matters. In 2021, she voted against legislation that was passed by the City Council to restrict the use of rubber bullets, tear gas, and pepper spray by the Boston Police Department.

In early 2021, amid the COVID-19 pandemic, she partnered with fellow city councilor Michelle Wu to propose a measure that would provide paid leave to municipal employees that feel ill after receiving the vaccine.

In July 2021, amid her mayoral campaign, Essaibi George denied allegations made in an investigative article published in The Boston Globe that she had used her office to try to prevent the construction of a building that would block the views of a building owned by her husband, a real estate developer. If the allegations are true, they pose a potential violation of a state conflict of interest law.

In September 2021, a resolution authored by Councilor Lydia Edwards and co-sponsored by Essaibi George and Michelle Wu was passed by the City Council. The ordinance extends paid child leave for municipal employees to all forms of pregnancy loss, including abortion. The ordinance was signed into law by Acting Mayor Kim Janey soon after.

== Mayoral campaign ==
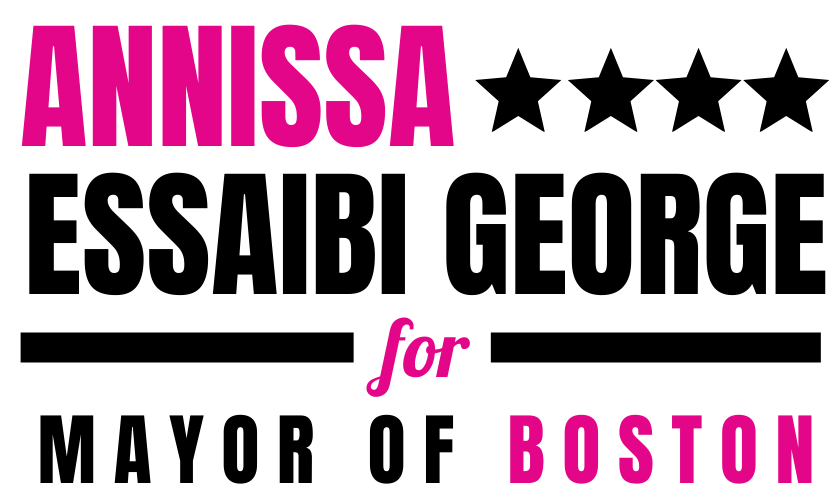
Logo for Essaibi George's mayoral campaign

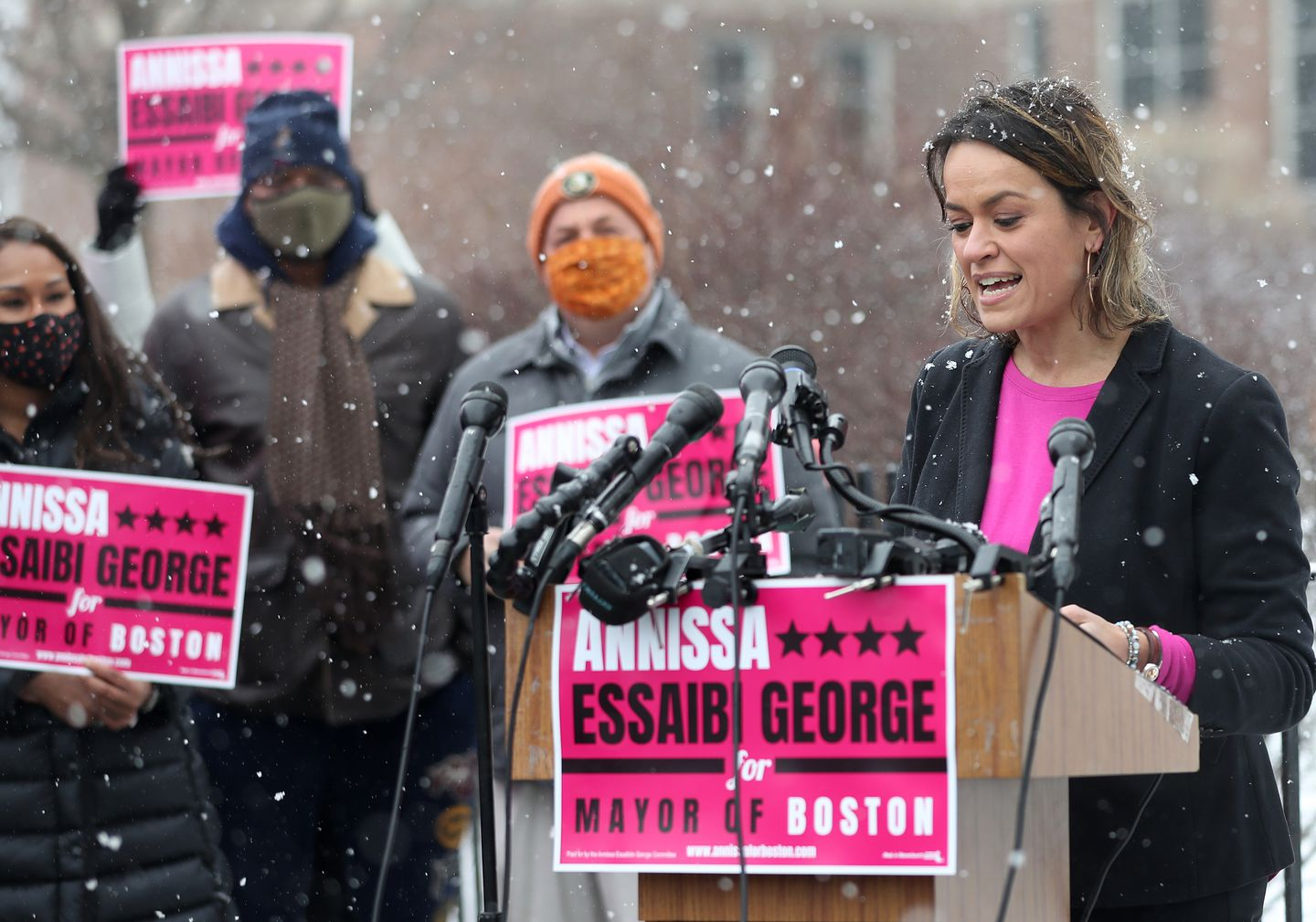
Essaibi George campaigning in January 2021

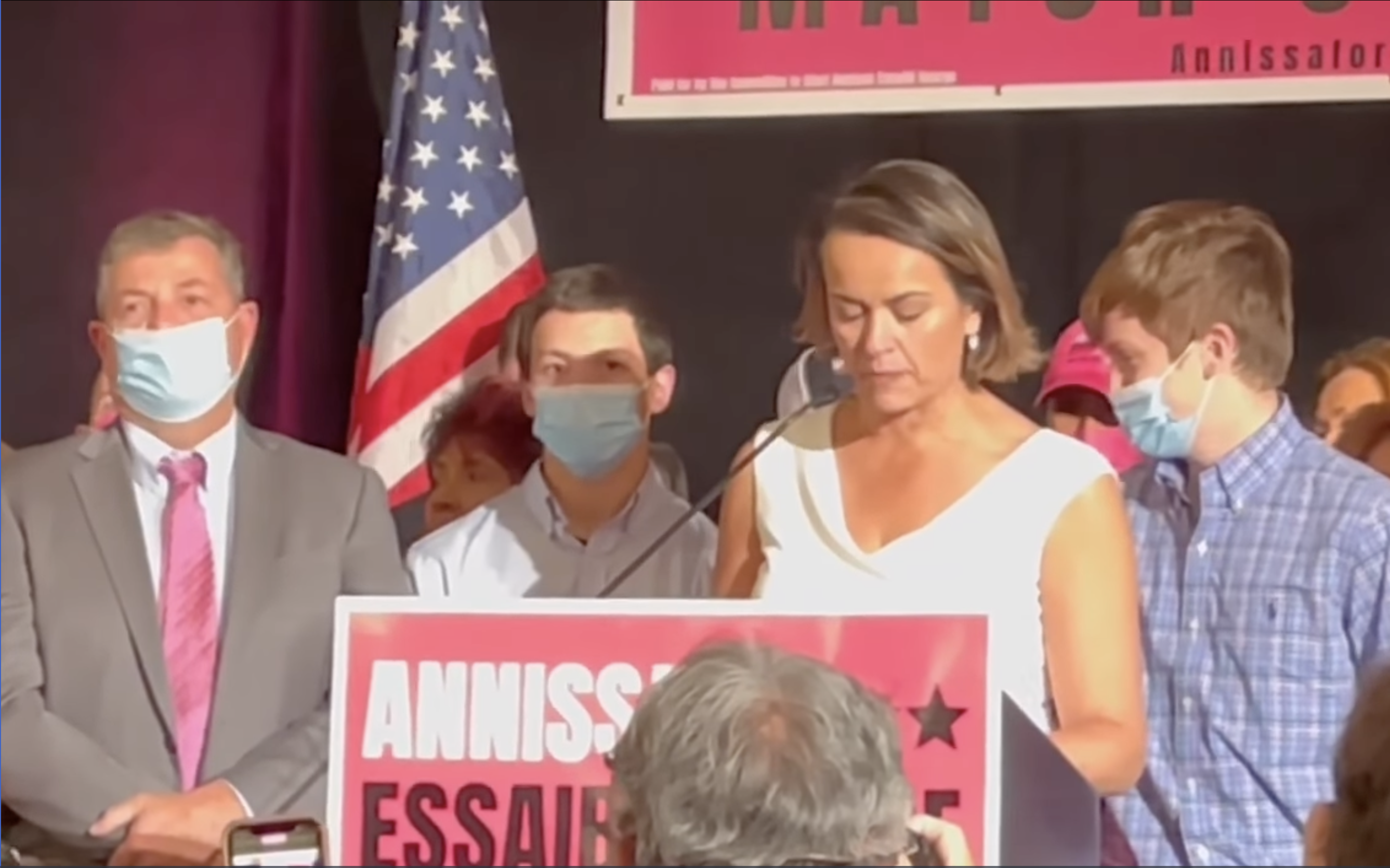
Essaibi George delivering her general election concession speech

On January 27, 2021, Essaibi George confirmed that she would run in the 2021 Boston mayoral election, considered a "wide open" race due to the then-expected confirmation of Mayor Walsh as United States Secretary of Labor; Walsh was confirmed to his Cabinet post in March.

Essaibi George was often described as a "centrist" or "moderate" candidate in comparison to the other candidates. Among her endorsers is former Boston police chief William G. Gross, who is also heading one of the two super PACs that backed her candidacy in the nonpartisan primary. That super PAC received $495,000 from New Balance owner and longtime Republican donor Jim Davis, who in 2016 had contributed nearly $400,000 to the Trump Victory PAC. Prior to making his contribution to the PAC, Davis had privately met with Essaibi George. Her ties to pro-Trump individuals and groups resulted in some of her critics characterizing her as aligned with Trump or Republicans, characterizations which Essaibi George repudiated.

In the preliminary election on September 14, her campaign placed second with 22.4% of the vote, outperforming acting mayor Kim Janey and several other challengers to advance to the general election with first-place winner Michelle Wu, who earned 33.4% of the vote.

While Walsh did not endorse a candidate, Essaibi George was regarded to be closely aligned with the popular former mayor's brand of political ideology. Her platform was more in line with those Walsh had twice won election on, being more moderate than Wu's. Promoting herself as being a pragmatic centrist, Essaibi George criticized Wu's policy approach as "abstract" and "academic". Essaibi George also sought to appeal towards trade union-aligned voters, who had played a major role in Walsh's electoral victories. During her campaign, she often touted her experience as an educator.

Essaibi George was often described as a police-friendly candidate compared to her opponents. On public safety and law enforcement, Essaibi George supported police reform. However, she was the only one of the election's five major candidates to oppose cutting the Boston Police Department's budget. She expressed her belief that the city needed to increase the size of its police force. Her public safety platform also touted community policing as being a means to address shortcomings in the city. Essaibi George's campaign platform described gun violence as a "racial justice issue, a public health issue and a public safety issue".

Ellen Barry of The New York Times described Essaibi George as promising "more harmonious dealings" with real estate developers than her opponents. Barry described Essaibi George's stances on development as one of the two greatest contrasts between her and her general election opponent Wu, who took stances on development and housing (such as Wu's support of rent control and dissolving the Boston Planning & Development Agency) that Essaibi George had criticized as strongly detrimental to development in the city. The other greatest contrast between Essaibi George and Wu, per Barry's opinion, was their aforementioned differences on whether to make cuts to police funding.

On September 21, Essaibi George publicly urged super PACs to refrain from involvement in the general election. Her opponent Wu, the following day, made public remarks that only urged super PACs to refrain from negative campaigning. Essaibi George's public demand for super PACs to avoid involvement in the election came in the aftermath of the Dorchester Reporter revealing Jim Davis' contributions to one of the super PACs supporting her candidacy.

In the general election, Essaibi George placed emphasis on the fact that she is a native Bostonian. Her opponent, Wu, was originally from Chicago. During a radio interview, Essaibi George declared her belief that it was "relevant" that she was a native Bostonian. After these remarks, some analysts pointed out that, per the United States Census Bureau, 57% of Bostonians were born outside of the state of Massachusetts. In addition, Essaibi George touted herself as having a different leadership style than her opponent, claiming that she makes herself more available to residents and community leaders. However, an early September 2021 poll had shown that more of the primary election's likely voters recalled having personally met Wu than had recalled having personally met Essaibi George.

Essaibi George embarked on a "listen and learn" tour of various Boston neighborhoods, which she claimed would inform her "equity, inclusion and justice agenda". She released the resulting agenda on October 8.

Essaibi George faced a landslide defeat by Wu in the general election. In her victory speech, Wu praised Essaibi George as having been "incredibly gracious" when conceding defeat, and expressed her hope that Essaibi George would, "continue to be a strong partner" in her efforts for Bostonians.

== Post-City Council career ==
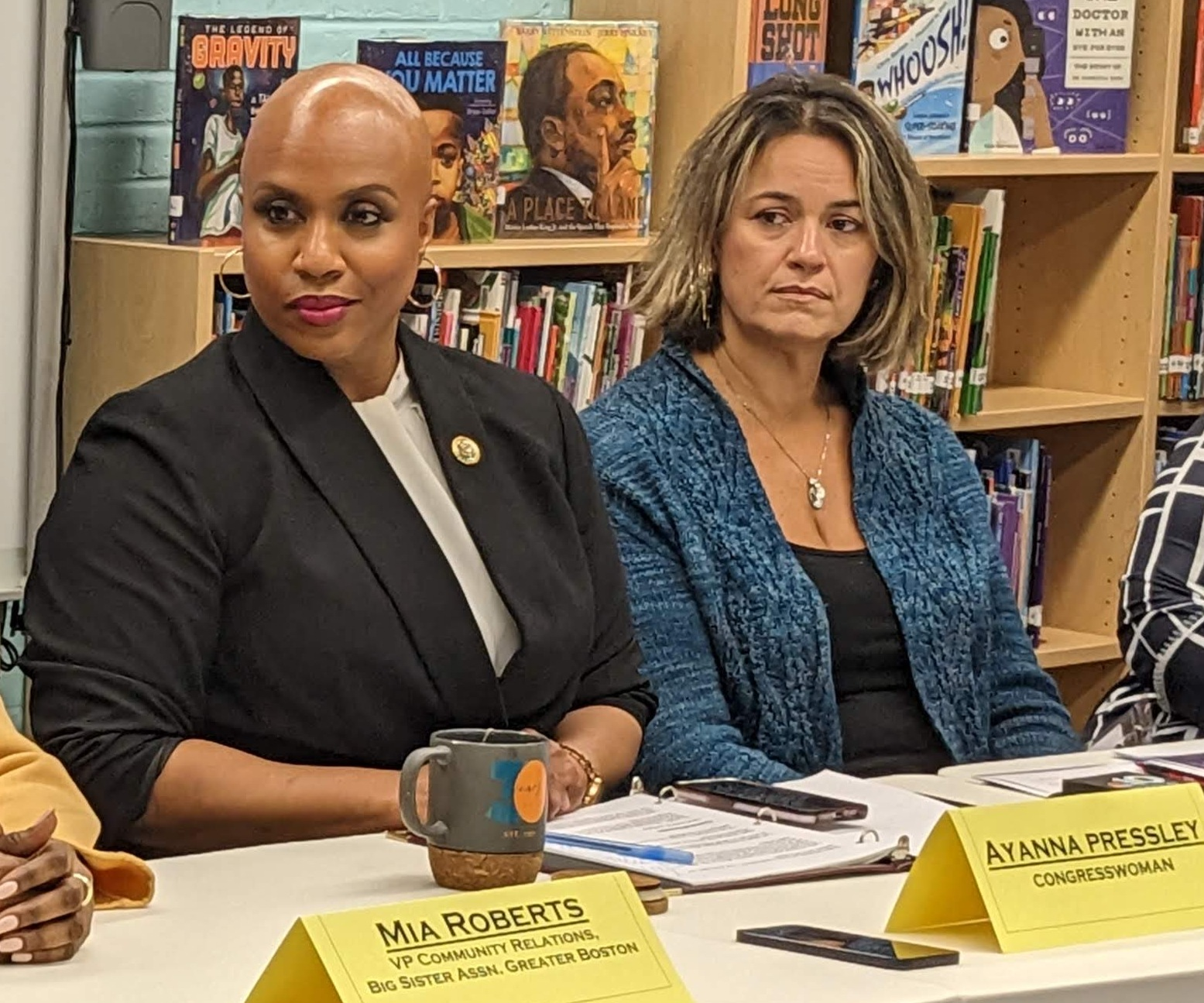
Essaibi George (right) as president and CEO of Big Sister Boston; sitting beside Congresswoman Ayanna Pressley

In 2022, Essaibi George returned to her roots of teaching, working as a substitute teacher in Boston's public schools. She did so amid a shortage of substitute teachers in the city's schools. In April 2022, amid the 2022 Russian invasion of Ukraine, Essaibi George made a humanitarian trip to Poland to provide supplies to refugees near the Polish-Ukrainian border. In October 2022, Essaibi George was appointed president and chief operating officer of Big Sister Boston by the nonprofit's board of directors. She began her tenure on November 28, 2022.

Essaibi George endorsed Josh Kraft's unsuccessful campaign against Wu in the 2025 Boston mayoral election.

== Personal life ==
Essaibi George is the founder and owner of a retail store in Dorchester called Stitch House, which sells yarn and fabrics and offers classes in knitting, sewing, quilting and crochet. She is married to Doug George, a real estate developer. She and her husband have four sons, including a set of triplets.

== Electoral history ==
=== City council ===
2013 Boston at-large City Council election
Candidate	Primary election		General election	
Candidate	Votes	%	Votes	%
Ayanna Pressley (incumbent)	42,915	16.71	60,799	18.30
Michelle Wu	29,384	11.44	59,741	17.98
Michael F. Flaherty	39,904	15.54	55,104	16.59
Stephen J. Murphy (incumbent)	31,728	12.35	44,993	13.54
Annissa Essaibi George	12,244	4.77	30,538	9.19
Jeffrey Michael Ross	13,939	5.43	28,879	8.69
Martin J. Keogh	15,743	6.13	26,500	7.98
Jack F. Kelly III	11,909	4.64	23,967	7.22
Catherine M. O'Neill	10,952	4.26		
Althea Garrison	10,268	4.00		
Ramon Soto	9,928	3.87		
Philip Arthur Frattaroli	5,832	2.27		
Gareth R. Saunders	5,363	2.09		
Christopher J. Conroy	3,433	1.34		
Seamus M. Whelan	3,118	1.21		
Francisco L. White	2745	1.07		
Douglas D. Wohn	2,382	0.93		
Frank John Addivinola Jr.	2,240	0.87		
Keith B. Kenyon	1,950	0.76		
Jamarhl Crawford	21†	0.01		
all others	832	0.32	1,658	0.50

† write-in votes

2015 Boston at-large City Council election
Candidate	Votes	%
Ayanna Pressley (incumbent)	31,783	24.21
Michelle Wu (incumbent)	28,908	22.02
Michael F. Flaherty (incumbent)	26,473	20.16
Annissa Essaibi George	23,447	17.86
Stephen J. Murphy (incumbent)	19,546	14.89
Jovan J. Lacet write-in	95	0.07
Charles Yancey write-in	39	0.03
Jean-Claud Sanon write-in	25	0.02
Andrea Campbell write-in	13	0.01
all others	959	0.73

2017 Boston at-large City Council election
Candidate	Votes	%
Michelle Wu (incumbent)	65,040	24.47
Ayanna Pressley (incumbent)	57,520	21.64
Michael F. Flaherty (incumbent)	51,673	19.44
Annissa Essaibi George (incumbent)	45,564	17.14
Althea Garrison	1,825	6.87
Domingos DaRosa	11,647	4.38
William A. King	8,773	3.30
Pat Payaso	6,124	2.30
all others	1,230	0.46

2019 Boston at-large City Council election
Candidate	Primary election		General election	
Candidate	Votes	%	Votes	%
Michelle Wu (incumbent)	26,622	19.41	41,664	20.73
Annissa Essaibi George (incumbent)	18,993	13.85	34,109	16.97
Michael F. Flaherty (incumbent)	18,766	13.68	33,284	16.56
Julia Mejia	10,799	7.87	22,492	11.19
Alejandra Nicole St. Guillen	11,910	8.68	22,491	11.19
Erin J. Murphy	9,385	6.84	16,867	8.39
Althea Garrison (incumbent)	9,720	7.09	16,189	8.05
David Halbert	6,354	4.76	13,214	6.57
Martin Marty Keogh	6,246	4.55		
Jeffrey Michael Ross	5,078	3.70		
Priscilla E. Flint-Banks	4,094	2.98		
Domingos DaRosa	2,840	2.07		
Michel Denis	2,108	1.54		
William A. King	1,809	1.32		
Herb Alexander Lozano	1,510	1.10		
all others	766	0.56	704	0.35

=== Mayor ===
2021 Boston mayoral election
Candidate	Primary election		General election	
Candidate	Votes	%	Votes	%
Michelle Wu	36,060	33.40	91,794	63.96
Annissa Essaibi George	24,268	22.48	51,125	35.62
Andrea Campbell	21,299	19.73		
Kim Janey (acting incumbent)	21,047	19.49		
John Barros	3,459	3.20		
Robert Cappucci	1,185	1.10		
Jon Santiago (withdrawn)	368	0.34		
Richard Spagnuolo	286	0.26		
Scattering	0	0.00	595	0.41
Total	107,972	100	144,380	100
