= Massachusetts House of Representatives' 5th Suffolk district =

American legislative district

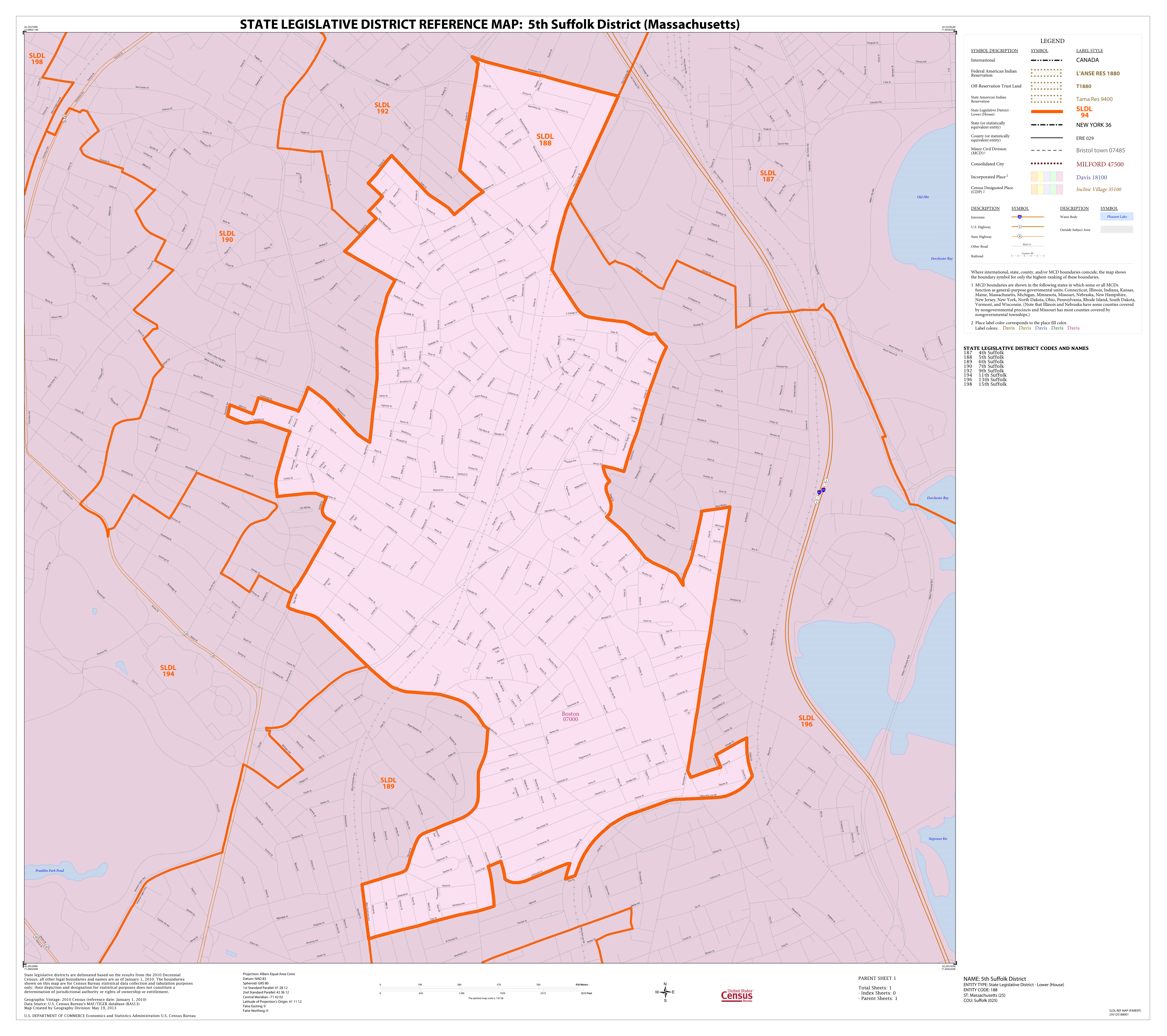
Map of Massachusetts House of Representatives' 5th Suffolk district, based on the 2010 United States census.

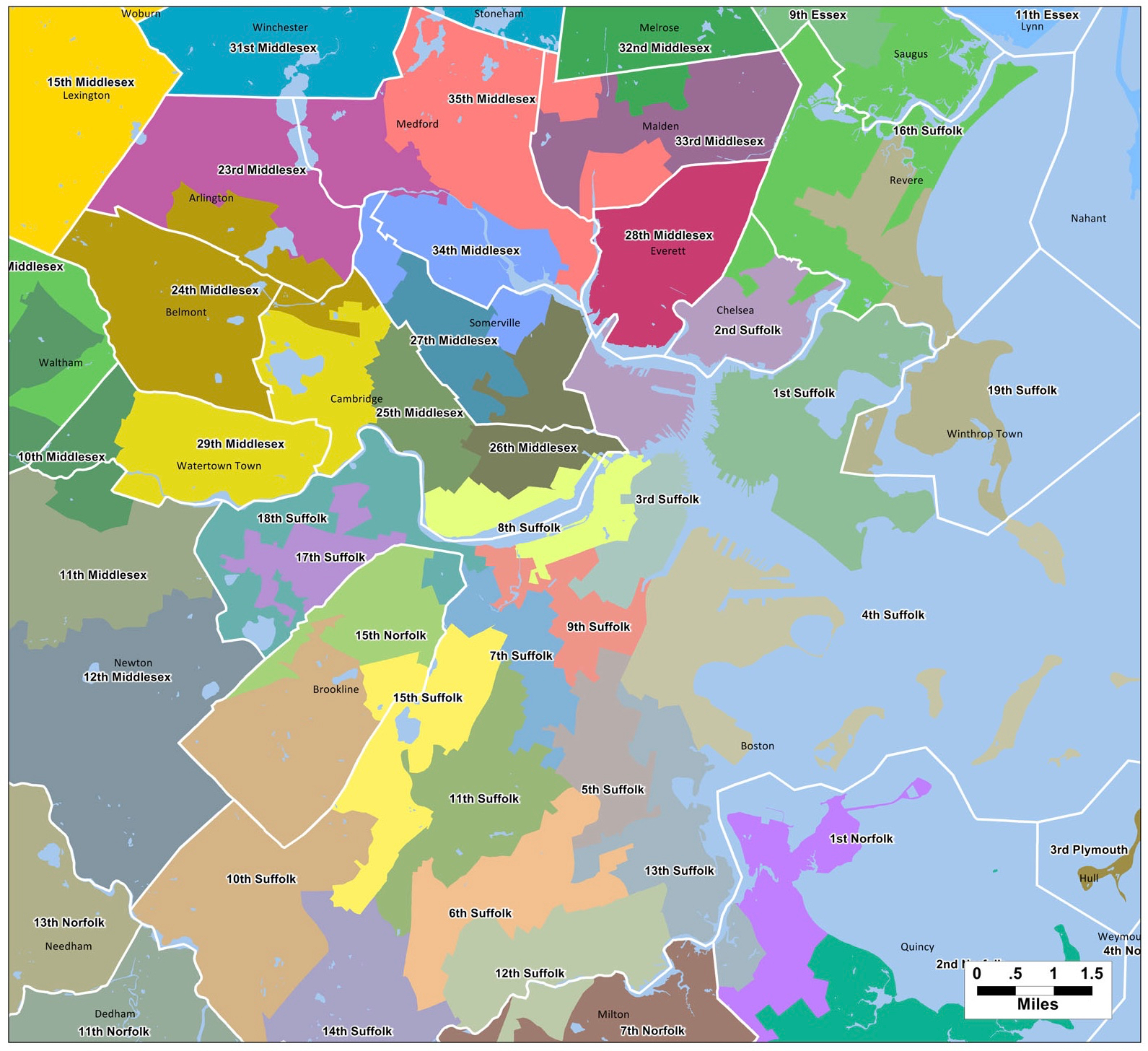
Map of Massachusetts House of Representatives districts for Suffolk County, apportioned in 2011

Massachusetts House of Representatives' 5th Suffolk district in the United States is one of 160 legislative districts included in the lower house of the Massachusetts General Court. It covers part of the city of Boston in Suffolk County. Democrat Christopher Worrell of Dorchester has represented the district since 2023.

The current district geographic boundary overlaps with those of the Massachusetts Senate's 1st Suffolk and 2nd Suffolk districts.

== Representatives ==
- Edward Sands, circa 1858-1859
- Abraham G. Wyman, circa 1858
- Frederick Whiton, circa 1859
- Patrick J. Calnan, circa 1888
- Edward Gagan, circa 1888
- John I. Fitzgerald, circa 1920
- Louis Orenberg, circa 1920
- Edward A. Scigliano, circa 1920
- Christian Herter, circa 1939
- Henry Lee Shattuck, circa 1945
- James C. Bayley, circa 1951
- Sherman Miles, 1947–1953
- John Yerxa, 1953–1957
- William Bulger, circa 1967
- Barney Frank, circa 1975
- Richard J. Rouse
- Nelson Merced, 1989-1993
- Althea Garrison, 1993-1995
- Charlotte Golar Richie, 1995-1999
- Marie St. Fleur, 1999-2011
- Carlos Henriquez, 2011-2014
- Evandro Carvalho, 2014-2019
- Liz Miranda, 2019-2023
- Christopher Worrell, 2023-current

== See also ==
- List of Massachusetts House of Representatives elections
- Other Suffolk County districts of the Massachusetts House of Representatives: 1st, 2nd, 3rd, 4th, 6th, 7th, 8th, 9th, 10th, 11th, 12th, 13th, 14th, 15th, 16th, 17th, 18th, 19th
- List of Massachusetts General Courts
- List of former districts of the Massachusetts House of Representatives

== Images ==
Portraits of legislators

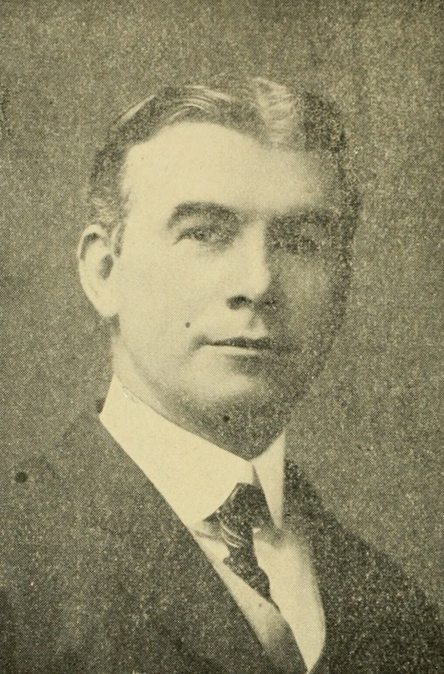
Ignatius Carleton

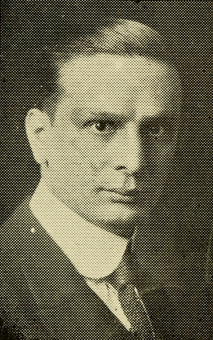
Edward Scigliano

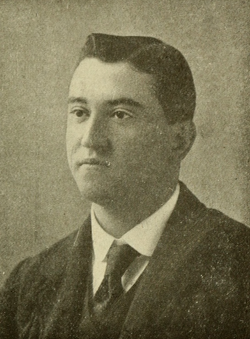
John Donovan

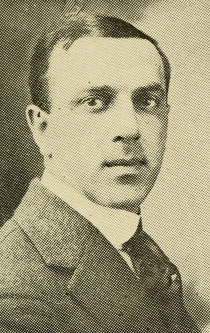
Philip Feinberg

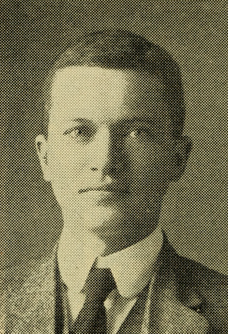
Henry Shattuck

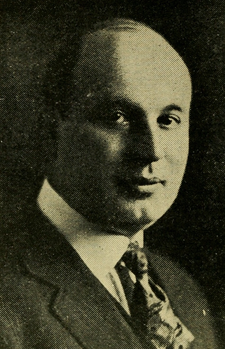
Bernard Finkelstein

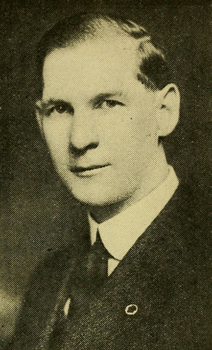
John I. Fitzgerald

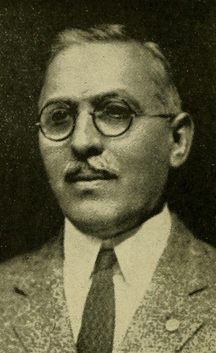
Joseph Langone

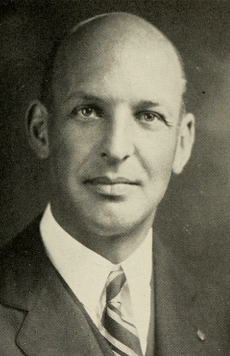
Laurence Curtis

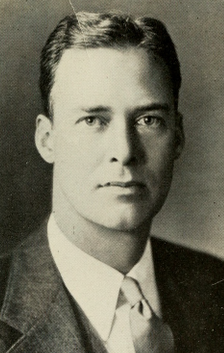
Christian Herter

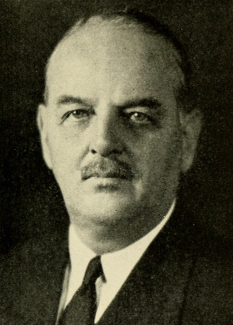
Stuart Rand

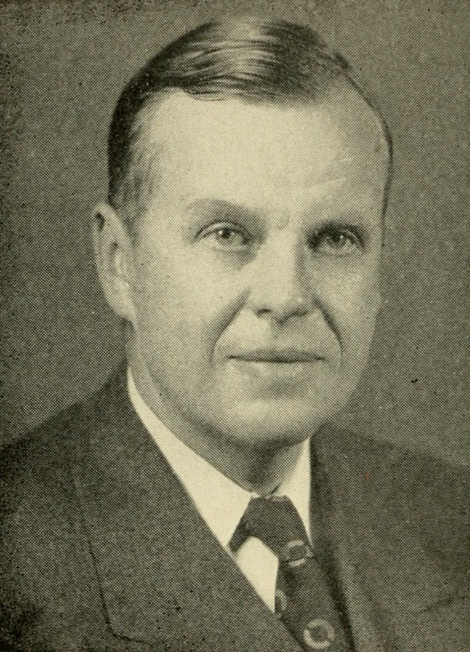
James Bayley

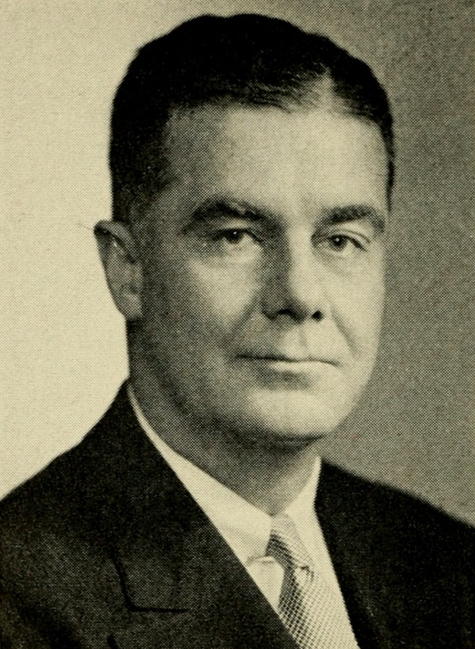
John Eliot Yerxa

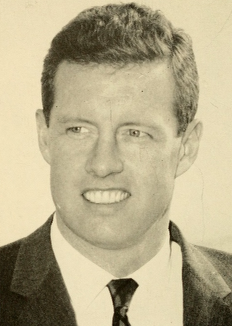
Gerald O'Leary

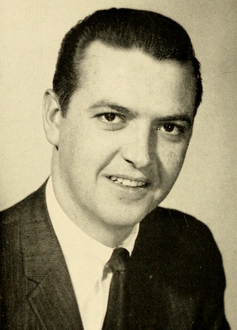
Michael Flaherty

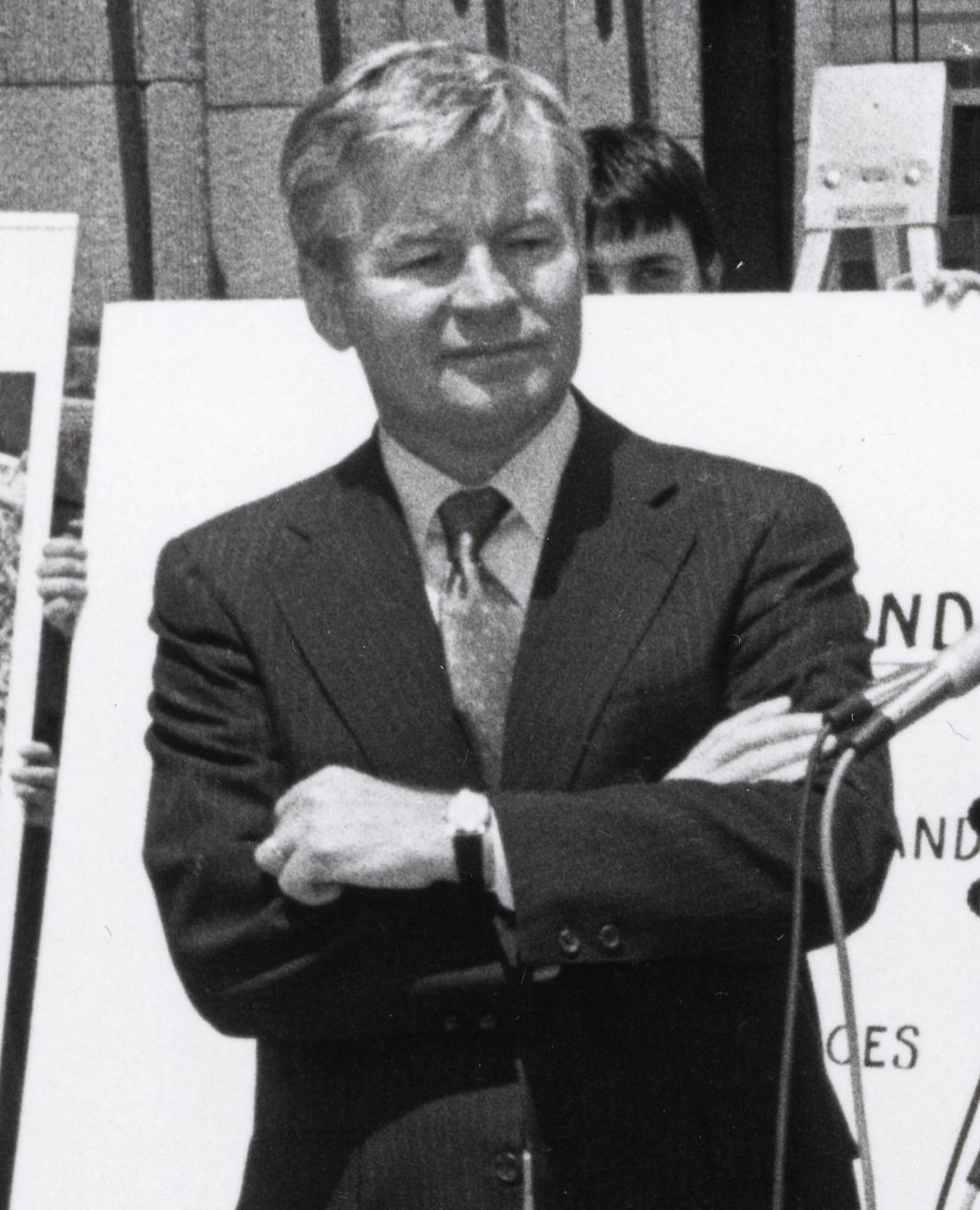
William Bulger

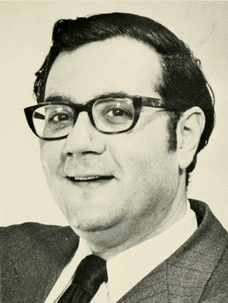
Barney Frank

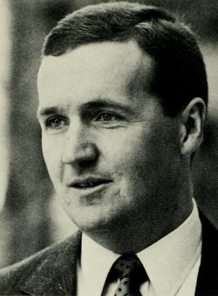
Richard Rouse

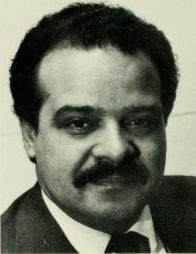
Nelson Merced

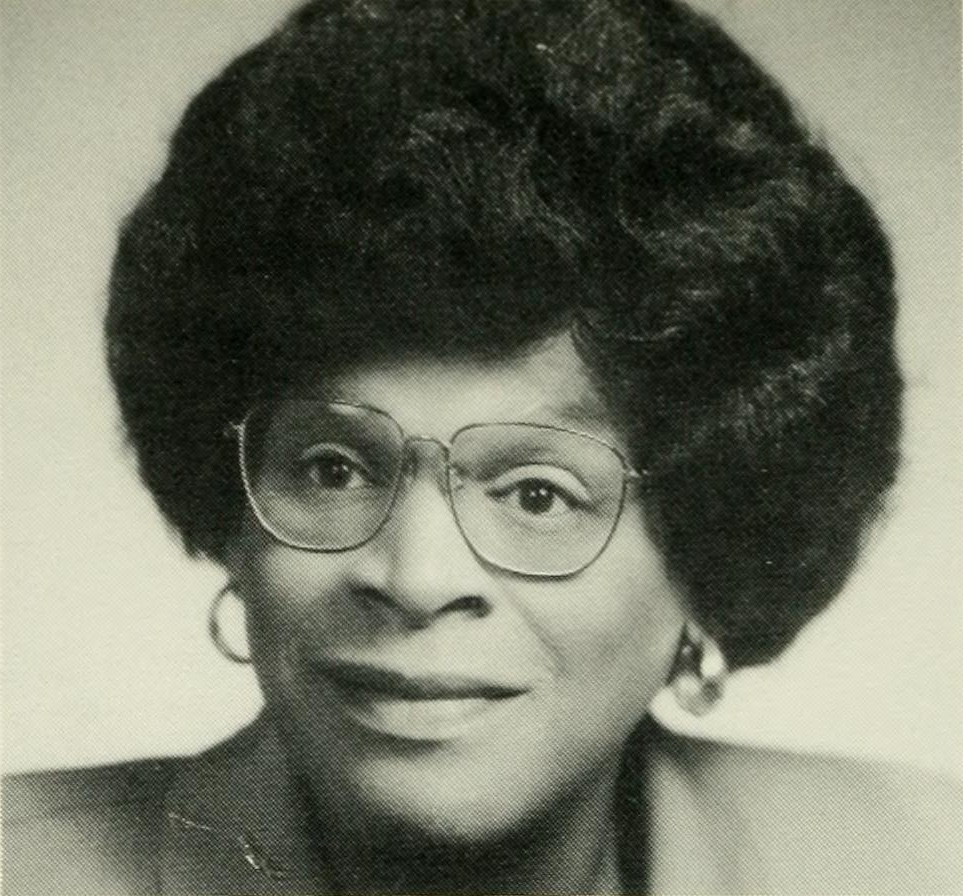
Althea Garrison

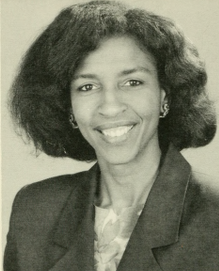
Charlotte Golar Richie

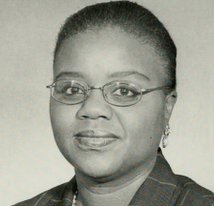
Marie St Fleur

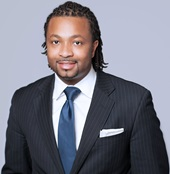
Evandro Carvalho

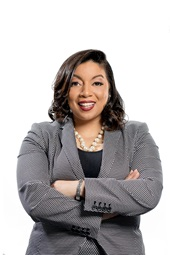
Liz Miranda

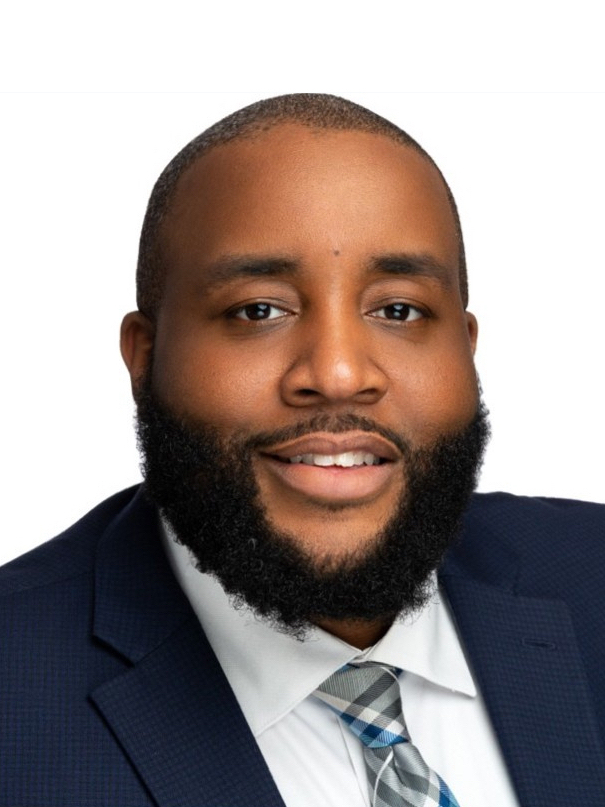
Christopher Worrell
