= Evandro Carvalho =

American politician

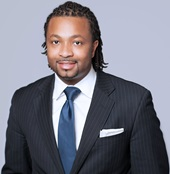

Member of the Massachusetts House of Representatives from the 5th Suffolk District
- In office May 14, 2014 – January 2, 2019
- Preceded by: Carlos Henriquez
- Succeeded by: Liz Miranda

Personal details
- Born: September 9, 1981 (age 44) Cape Verde
- Party: Democratic
- Education: University of Massachusetts Amherst (BA); Howard University (JD)

Evandro C. Carvalho (born September 9, 1981) is an American attorney and politician who served in the Massachusetts House of Representatives from 2014 to 2019. He is a member of the Democratic Party and represented the Fifth Suffolk District, comprising the Dorchester neighborhood of Boston.

== Early life and education ==
Carvalho was born in Cape Verde. He emigrated to Boston when he was 15 years old. After graduating from Madison Park Technical Vocational High School, he earned a Bachelor of Arts degree in legal studies from the University of Massachusetts Amherst and a Juris Doctor from the Howard University School of Law.

== Career ==
He worked in the office of the Suffolk County District Attorney as an assistant district attorney from 2011 to 2013.

He won the Democratic Party primary election for the Fifth Suffolk seat on April 1, 2014, and was unopposed in the general election on April 29, winning with around 739 votes. He was sworn in May 14.

In 2018, Carvalho did not run for re-election in his seat, instead launching a campaign for the Democratic nomination for Suffolk County District Attorney. He lost the primary to Rachael Rollins, finishing third in a field of five candidates. Carvalho ran in the 2021 open-race for the fourth district seat on the Boston City Council. While he progressed from a crowded nonpartisan primary election, he was defeated by political newcomer Brian Worrell by a large margin in the general election.

=== Other activities ===
In 2006 he was a legal intern with the Immigration Law Project at South Coastal Counties Legal Services, Inc. in Brockton, Massachusetts. From 2007 to 2010 he was a summer associate and later associate with WilmerHale. From 2013 to 2014, he was a field legal counsel with Liberty Mutual Insurance. From 2011 to 2014 he served on the board of directors of Teen Empowerment.

Since August 2019 he has served as executive director of the Boston Human Rights Commission.
