= Carlos Henriquez =

American politician

Member of the Massachusetts House of Representatives from the 5th Suffolk District
- In office January 5, 2011 – February 6, 2014
- Preceded by: Marie St. Fleur
- Succeeded by: Evandro Carvalho

Personal details
- Born: Roxbury, Boston, Massachusetts
- Party: Democratic
- Education: University of Massachusetts Boston
- Occupation: Community Organizer; Politician

Carlos Tony Henriquez is an American Democratic politician who represented the 5th Suffolk district in the Massachusetts House of Representatives prior to his expulsion from office in 2014. He was the first house member to be expelled from office since 1916.

== Community engagement ==
In his neighborhood, he is actively involved with Dudley Street Neighborhood Initiative (DSNI), where he works with youth from the neighborhood on community planning and organizing projects, ranging from clean-ups to planning community centers. Henriquez is also involved with the Ward 13 Democratic Committee, the NAACP, the Young Professional Network of the Urban League, the Roxbury Master Plan Oversight Committee, and the Roxbury Neighborhood Council.

== Kidnapping and assault charge ==
Henriquez was charged with assault and kidnapping of a woman in July 2012 and released after posting $1000 bond. In September, the kidnapping charge was dropped, though the others remained. On January 14, 2014, Henriquez was convicted of two counts assault and battery charges and sentenced to 2.5 years in jail, with six months to be served in the Middlesex House of Correction and the remaining two years to be spent on probation.

On February 6, 2014, the House of Representatives voted 146 to 5 to expel Henriquez. It was the first time since Harry C. Foster's expulsion in 1916 that the House had expelled one of its members.

== Return to politics ==
In March 2017, Henriquez announced his candidacy for the Boston City Council. In the preliminary election held in September 2017, Henriquez finished 11th in a field of 13 candidates for the District 7 seat, with 4.29% of the votes cast; he did not advance to the November general election.
