= Liz Miranda =

American politician (born 1981)

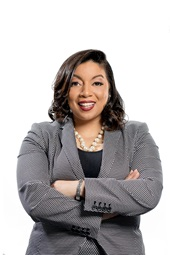

Member of the Massachusetts Senate from the 2nd Suffolk district
- Incumbent
- Assumed office January 5, 2023
- Preceded by: Sonia Chang-Díaz

Member of the Massachusetts House of Representatives from the 5th Suffolk district
- In office January 2, 2019 – January 4, 2023
- Preceded by: Evandro Carvalho
- Succeeded by: Christopher Worrell

Personal details
- Born: June 29, 1981 (age 45) Boston, Massachusetts, U.S.
- Party: Democratic
- Education: Wellesley College

Elizabeth Miranda (born June 29, 1981) is an American community organizer and politician. She is a state senator representing the Massachusetts Senate's 2nd Suffolk district after winning a five-way Democratic Primary Election, and advancing to an uncontested race in the 2022 Massachusetts general election. Prior to that, since January 2019, Miranda had served as the Democratic Massachusetts State Representative for the Fifth Suffolk district. Her district comprises parts of the Dorchester and Roxbury neighborhoods of Boston. She is a member of the Massachusetts Black and Latino Legislative Caucus.

Miranda has passed legislation that aims to close racial disparities in maternal health outcomes of Black women, as well as legislation to advance environmental justice and was a lead author in the police reform omnibus legislation passed in 2021. In 2021, Miranda was named Best Politician by Boston Magazine and Progressive Legislator of the Year by Progressive Massachusetts.

== Early life and education ==
Miranda was born on June 29, 1981, in Roxbury, Boston. Her mother was a high school junior at the time of Miranda's birth, motivating her to drop out of education and begin to work to support her family.

Miranda is a graduate of the John D. O'Bryant High School of Math & Science in Roxbury. From 1998 to 2002, Miranda attended Wellesley College, from which she graduated after four years with a Bachelor of Arts in Africana studies and urban studies.

Miranda started her community organizing work as a teen organizer with Nubian Roots Youth Committee of the Dudley Street Neighborhood Association, working on vacant land issues and environmental justice.

== Massachusetts House of Representatives (2019-2023) ==
Citing President Trump's 2016 election as an important motivating factor, Miranda launched a campaign to seek the fifth Suffolk seat in the Massachusetts House of Representatives after the incumbent, Evandro Carvalho, opted not to run for reelection, launching instead an unsuccessful bid for the Democratic party's nomination in the position of Suffolk County district attorney.

She faced a contested Democratic primary, but received a total of 59.4 percent of the votes in a field of four candidates. In the general election, she faced Republican nominee Althea Garrison, a perennial candidate for the seat who had previously served as the district's representative from 1993 to 1995. Miranda won overwhelmingly in the general election, with 88.7 percent to Garrison's 11 percent. Subsequently, Miranda was sworn into the State House on January 2, 2019.

Miranda was a principal author of portions of the 2020 police reform law, which established the Peace Officer Standards and Training (POST) Commission, strengthened officer certification and accountability, restricted the use of no-knock warrants, and enacted statewide policing reforms.

== Massachusetts Senate (2024-present) ==
On December 9, 2021, Rep. Liz Miranda announced her campaign for State Senate of the 2nd Suffolk District, which was redistricted in 2021. She announced after previous Senator Sonia Chang Diaz declared that she would be a candidate for governor in 2022.

Liz Miranda defeated Nika Elugardo, Dianne Wilkerson, Miniard Culpepper, and James Grant with 33% of the vote in the primary. In the general election, Miranda ran unopposed and was elected senator for the 2nd Suffolk District.

Miranda was the lead Senate author of the 2024 Massachusetts maternal health omnibus law, which established a licensure pathway for certified professional midwives, expanded insurance coverage for doula and midwifery services, created a statewide postpartum home visiting program, required coverage of perinatal depression screenings, and expanded access to community-based maternal health services.

Through the annual state budget process, she also secured funding for the Birth Center Grants Program and implementation of the Moms Matter Act.

Miranda sponsored legislation establishing 225 additional liquor licenses for historically underserved Boston neighborhoods, including Roxbury, Dorchester, Mattapan, Hyde Park, Jamaica Plain, Mission Hill, the South End, Fenway, and parts of Roslindale. The legislation was intended to promote economic development and expand opportunities for locally owned businesses. In 2024, Miranda and other leaders behind the legislation were recognized by The Boston Globe as "Bostonians of the Year">

Miranda has advocated for reforms to conditions within Massachusetts correctional facilities, including efforts to reduce the use of prolonged solitary confinement and increase transparency within the Department of Correction.

Following the homicide of her brother, Miranda has advocated for increased investment in community-based violence prevention and intervention programs. Through the annual state budget process, she has supported increased funding for gun violence prevention, trauma recovery, neighborhood-based intervention programs, and community violence prevention initiatives.

Miranda voted for legislation expanding ballot access for eligible incarcerated individuals held in county correctional facilities. The law requires correctional facilities to facilitate voter registration and absentee voting for individuals who remain eligible to vote under Massachusetts law.

Miranda led Senate passage of legislation reopening enrollment in the RetirementPlus pension program for certain Massachusetts public school teachers hired before July 1, 2001. The legislation created a one-time enrollment period through 2027, allowing eligible educators to purchase enhanced retirement benefits after previously missing enrollment deadlines.

Miranda has been a legislative advocate for tuition equity, sponsoring legislation to allow eligible undocumented students who attended Massachusetts high schools to qualify for in-state tuition and state financial aid at Massachusetts public colleges and universities. She supported enactment of tuition equity through the Fiscal Year 2024 state budget and implementation of the Massachusetts Application for State Financial Aid (MASFA).

Miranda was the lead Senate sponsor, alongside Senator Pavel Payano, of An Act to Advance Health Equity (S.901), omnibus legislation intended to reduce racial and socioeconomic disparities in health care through workforce development, expanded access to care, improved data collection, and increased accountability.

== Personal life ==
On June 4, 2021, Miranda returned to her alma mater, Wellesley College, to give the commencement address for the Class of 2021. Miranda spoke about her experience growing up in Roxbury and Dorchester, and she spoke about her grandfather, Manuel Goncalves Miranda, who came to Boston in pursuit of the American Dream in 1976 from the newly freed colony of Cape Verde on the west coast of Africa after a war led by Amílcar Cabral against Portuguese colonial rule.

On August 20, 2017, Miranda's 28-year-old brother, Michael A. Miranda, was shot and killed outside a nightclub in Boston's theater district. He was pronounced dead at 7:17 p.m. EST. This has inspired some of her campaign issues on stronger gun control, criminal justice reform, youth education (by introducing alternatives to violence) and the treatment of the distribution and oversight of firearms as a federal issue.

== See also ==
- 2019–2020 Massachusetts legislature
- 2021–2022 Massachusetts legislature
