= Lydia Edwards =

American politician (born 1981)

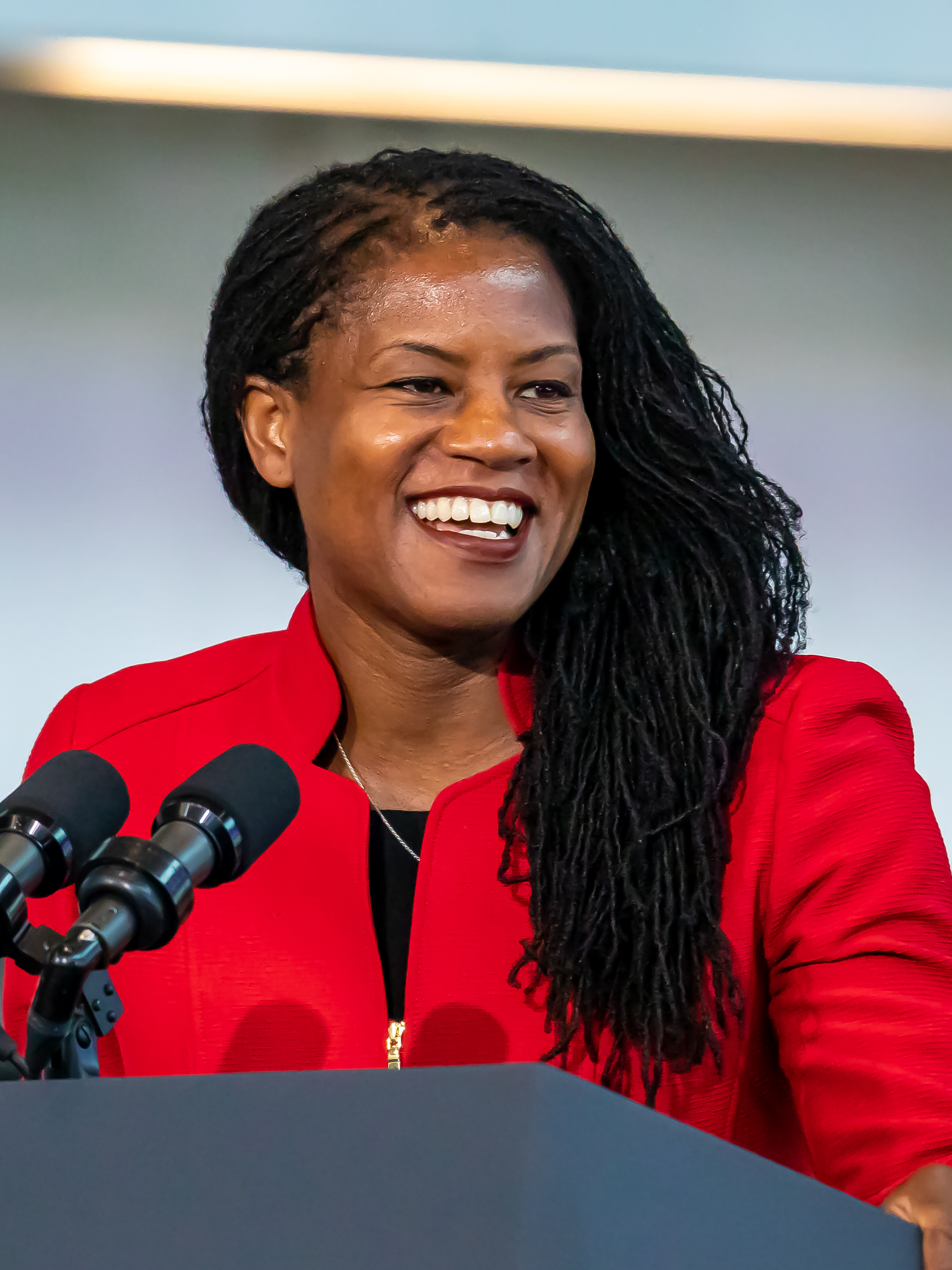
- Edwards in 2022

Member of the Massachusetts Senate
- Incumbent
- Assumed office January 20, 2022
- Preceded by: Joseph Boncore
- Constituency: 1st Suffolk and Middlesex district (2021–2023); 3rd Suffolk district (2023–present)

Member of the Boston City Council from the 1st district
- In office January 2018 – April 2022
- Preceded by: Salvatore LaMattina
- Succeeded by: Gabriela Coletta Zapata

Personal details
- Born: December 13, 1981 (age 44)
- Party: Democratic
- Education: Fordham University (BA); American University (JD); Boston University (LLM)

Lydia Marie Edwards (born December 13, 1981) is an American attorney and politician. She served as a member of the Boston City Council from the 1st district from 2018 to 2022 and has served as a member of the Massachusetts Senate from the 1st Suffolk and Middlesex district since 2022. She resigned from the Boston City Council at the end of April 2022.

== Early life and education ==
She and her twin sister were raised by their mother who served in the United States Air Force. Edwards earned a Bachelor of Arts degree from Fordham University, a Juris Doctor from the Washington College of Law, and a Master of Laws in taxation from Boston University School of Law.

== Career ==
Edwards has worked as a public interest attorney with Greater Boston Legal Services and served as the deputy director within the Mayor's Office of Housing Stability.

=== Boston City Council (2017–2022) ===
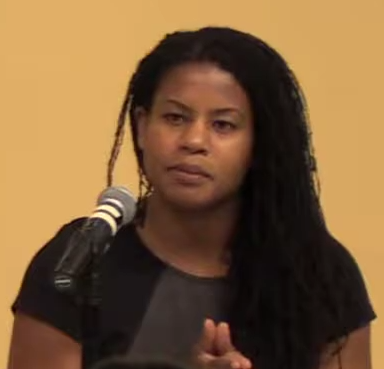
Edwards in 2018

Edwards was elected to the Boston City Council in November 2017 and assumed office in January 2018. She represents the North End, East Boston, and Charlestown. Edwards was a member of the council's liberal wing. Other members of this informal grouping included Ayanna Pressley and Michelle Wu.

In July 2018, Edwards and fellow city councilors Kim Janey and Michelle Wu introduced legislation to remove as-of-right designations for chain stores, requiring a conditional use permit for chain stores to open and operate in any area designated as a "neighborhood business district."

Edwards and fellow councilor Kim Janey proposed a real estate transfer tax. Negotiations with other city councilors reduced this to a 2% tax on properties valued at $2 million or more, a decrease from their original proposal of a 6% tax. In December 2019, the Boston City Council voted to adopt Janey and Edwards' home rule petition requesting that the state permit the city to impose such as tax. Mayor Marty Walsh advanced the home rule petition to the legislature. If the petition had been authorized by the state, revenue raised from the tax (predicted to be in excess of $160 million annually) was to be placed in the city's Neighborhood Housing Trust to build affordable housing.

In 2019, Edwards partnered with attorney general Maura Healey, congresswoman Ayanna Pressley, and fellow city councilor Michelle Wu in a digital campaign urging the state government to adopt the Roe Act. This was a proposed state statue intended to codify the protections of abortion care provided in the Roe v. Wade U.S. Supreme Court decision (a decision which was still good law at the time).

In 2019, in the aftermath of Super Happy Fun America's 2019 "Straight Pride Parade" and unrest that occurred related to it, Edwards offered her own praise of the city's police force, calling its officers "amazing superheroes". However, she objected to holding a vote on a resolution introduced by Councilor Althea Garrison (a Donald Trump-aligned conservative) that would offer "unwavering support for the Boston Police Department and the Boston Police Patrolmen's Association in their work" and would "unequivocally condemn any and all violence and disrespect" towards officers. Edwards argued that Garrison's proposed resolution appeared intended not to support officers, but rather to "intended to support a political agenda".

In 2021, Edwards led the effort to amend the Boston City Charter provision relating to city budgets. An ordinance for the city to hold a binding referendum on amending the city charter during its November 2021 municipal elections was passed by the city council. The amendment's changes included giving the City Council the power to line-item veto some of the items in a budget put forth by the mayor, amend a mayor's proposed budget both in whole and in part, and the ability to override a mayoral veto of a budget by a two-thirds vote. These changes provide the City Council with more powering the creation of a budget. Another change in the amendment was creating an Office of Participatory Budgeting, giving the city's residents more power in the creation of city budgets. In June 2021, Acting Mayor Kim Janey signed the ordinance. Weeks later, State Attorney General Maura Healey cleared the referendum for inclusion on the ballot. The referendum saw the amendment approved by voters, thereby amending the city charter.

Edwards joined council members Michelle Wu and Matt O'Malley in a years-long push to have the city divest its financial resources from fossil fuels. In November 2021, as mayor, Michelle Wu signed such an ordinance into law.

=== Massachusetts State Senate (2022–present) ===
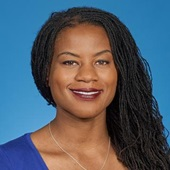
Official portrait

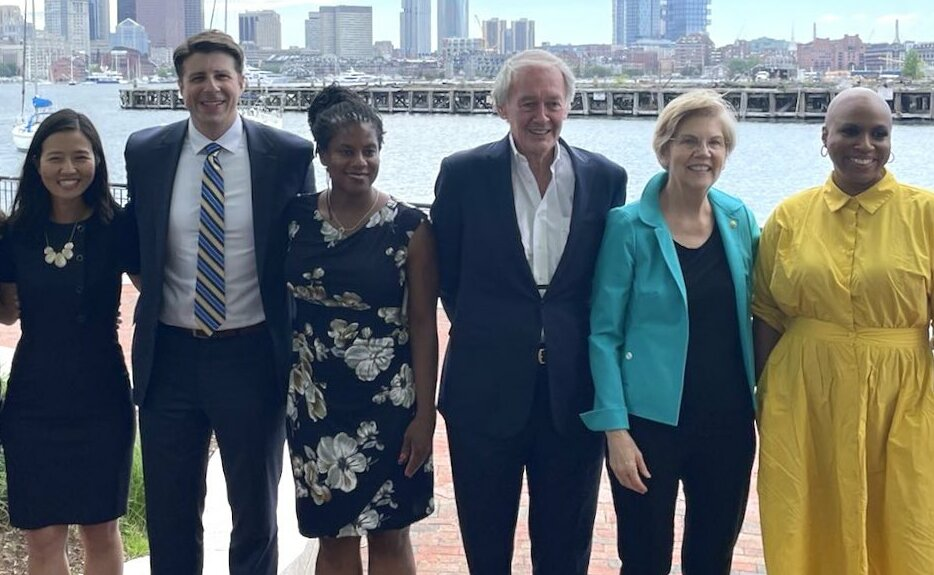
Edwards (third from left) in 2022 with Boston Mayor Michelle Wu (far left), U.S. Senator Ed Markey (third from right), U.S. Senator Elizabeth Warren (second from right), and Congresswoman Ayanna Pressley (far right)

In 2016, Edwards was an unsuccessful Democratic candidate in the special election for the First Suffolk & Middlesex District of the Massachusetts State Senate. However, she ran for the State Senate again in 2022, and this time she was successful. She won the Democratic primary on December 15, 2021, defeating Revere School Committee member Anthony D'Ambrosio by a 60%–40% margin. Edwards is the first woman and person of color to represent the senate district.

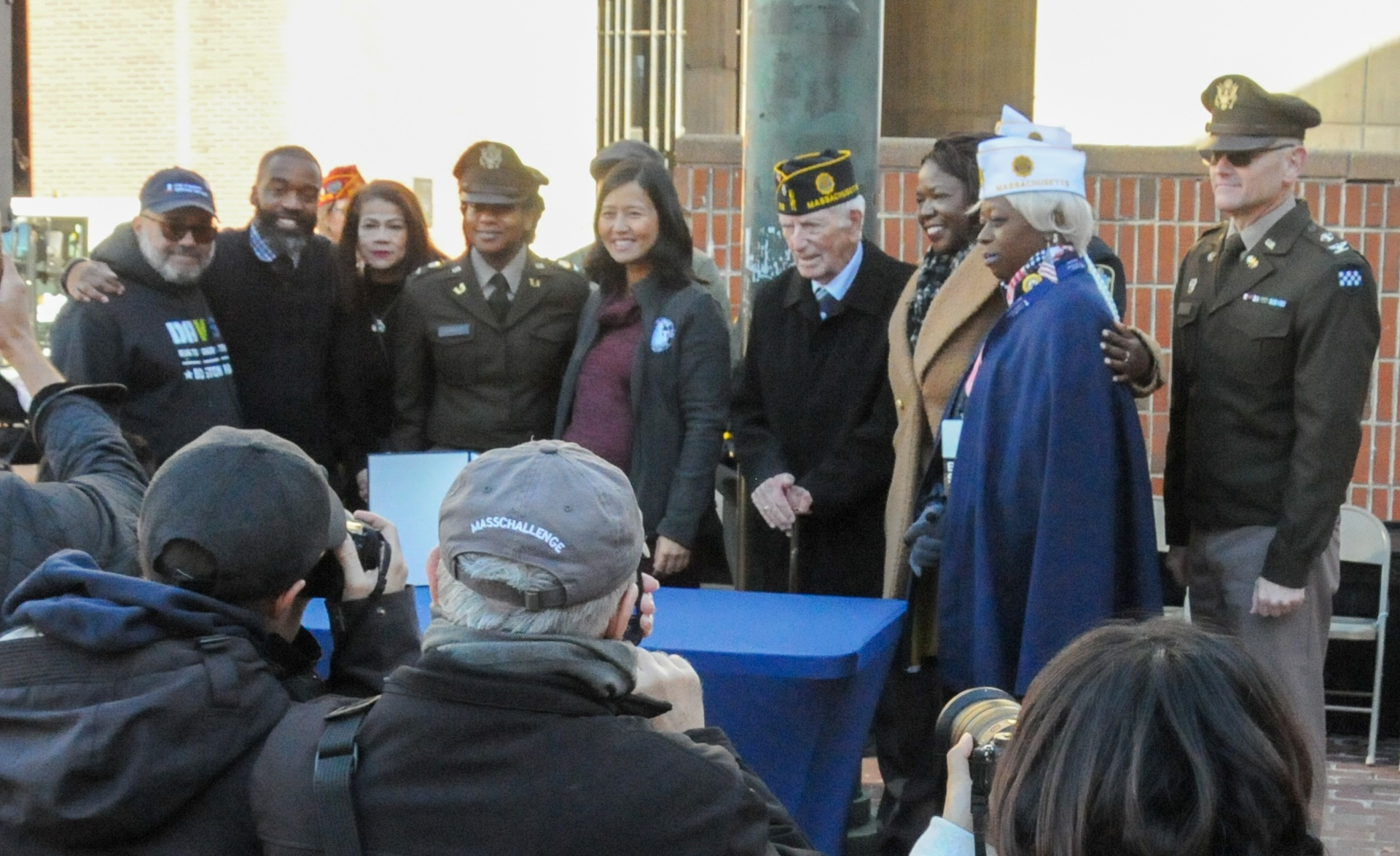
Edwards (fourth from left) wearing her Army National Guard JAG officer uniform while attending the 2024 Boston Veterans Day parade alongside other local officials (including several Boston city councilors and Mayor Wu)

In 2023, Edwards was sworn-in as a Judge Advocate General's Corps officer in the Massachusetts Army National Guard.

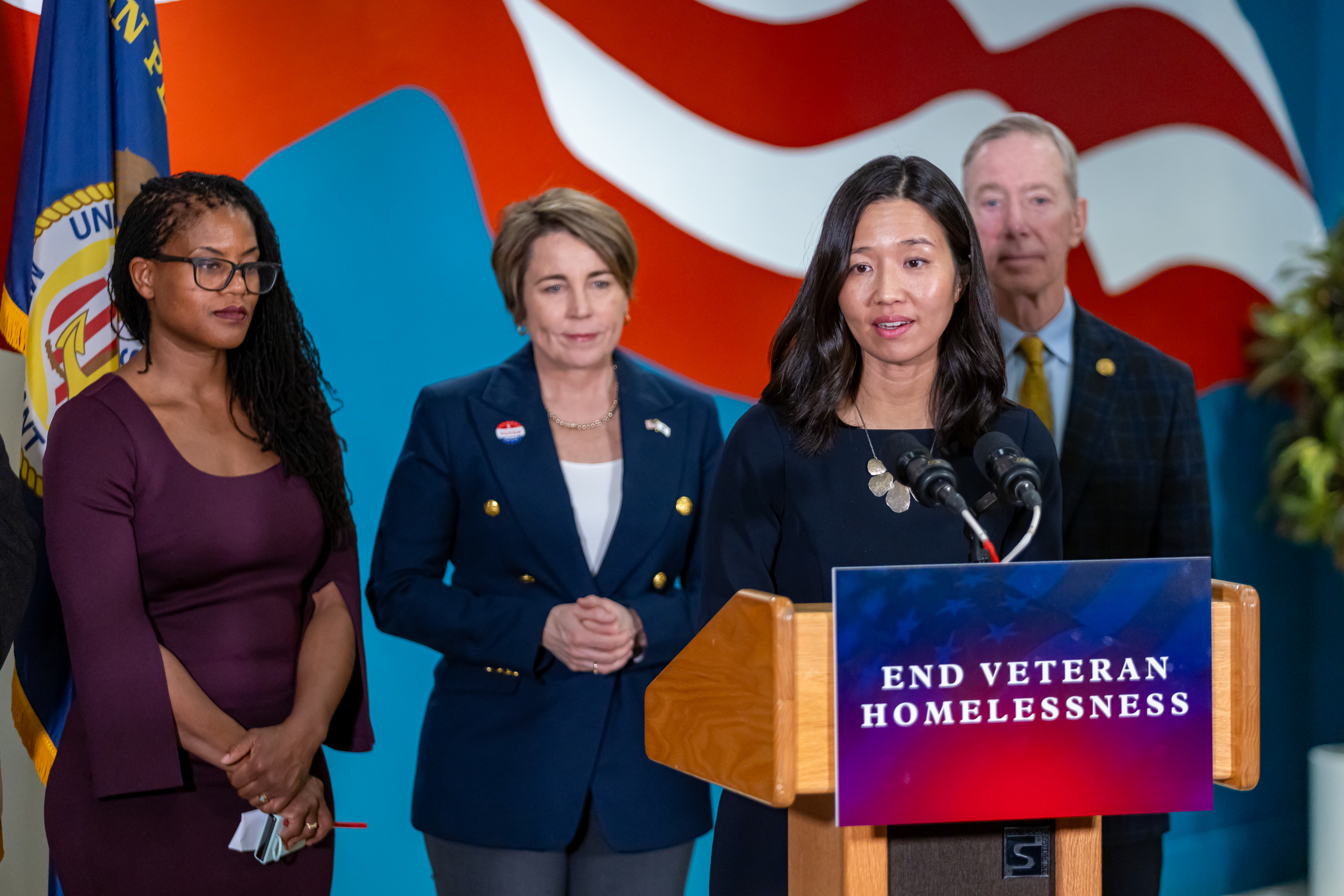
Edwards in 2024 with Governor Maura Healey, Boston Mayor Wu, and Congressman Stephen Lynch

Edwards speaks in 2025, accompanied by Sen. Warren, Gov. Healey, Sen. Markey

== Committee Assignments ==
In the 2025-26 session, Edwards sits on the following committees in the Senate:

- Judiciary - Chairperson
- Housing - Vice Chair
- Way and Means (Senate)
- Children, Families and Persons with Disabilities
- Consumer Protection and Professional Licensure
- Transportation
- Way and Means (Joint)

== Caucuses ==
Edwards is a member of the following caucus:

- Housing for All

== Commissions ==
Edwards is involved with the following commission:

- Affordable Housing Insurance

== Election results ==
=== 2022 ===
3rd Suffolk District Primary Election Results
Party	Candidate	Votes	%
Democratic Party Primary Results
Democratic	Lydia Marie Edwards (incumbent)	11,497	98.9%
write-in		131	1.1%
Total votes		11,628	100%

3rd Suffolk District General Election Results
Party	Candidate	Votes	%
Democratic	Lydia Marie Edwards (incumbent)	32,396	97.0%
write-in		1,006	3.0%
Total votes		33,402	100%
Democratic hold			

=== 2021 ===
Primary Special Election for 1st Suffolk and Middlesex District
Party	Candidate	Votes	%	±%
Democratic	Lydia Edwards	8,147	60.1%	
Democratic	Anthony D'Ambrosio	5,386	39.7%	
write-in		34	0.3%	

Special Election for 1st Suffolk and Middlesex District
Party	Candidate	Votes	%	±%
Democratic	Lydia Edwards	1,764	94.9%	
write-in		95	5.1%	

=== 2019 ===
General election for Boston City Council District 1, 2019
Party	Candidate	Votes	%	±%
Nonpartisan	Lydia Edwards	4,400	96.6%	
—	write in	155	3.4%	

=== 2017 ===
Candidates	Preliminary Election		General Election	
Candidates	Votes	%	Votes	%
Lydia Edwards	3,547	45.95%	6,906	52.70%
Stephen Passacantilli	3,628	47.00%	6,182	47.17%
Margaret Farmer	522	6.76%		
Write-in	22	0.29%	17	0.13%
Total	7,719	100	13,105	100
