= Liz Breadon =

American politician

Elizabeth A. "Liz" Breadon
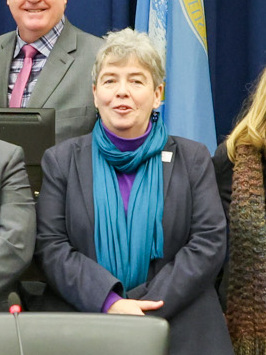
- Breadon in 2023

President of the Boston City Council
- Incumbent
- Assumed office January 5, 2026
- Preceded by: Ruthzee Louijeune

Member of the Boston City Council from the 9th district
- Incumbent
- Assumed office January 2020
- Preceded by: Mark Ciommo

Personal details
- Party: Democratic
- Education: Ulster University, Simmons University
- Profession: Physical therapist
- Website: liz4ab.com

Elizabeth A. "Liz" Breadon is a Democratic member of the Boston City Council who serves the Allston and Brighton neighborhoods (District 9) of Boston, Massachusetts. She was the first openly LGBTQ woman elected to the Boston City Council.

== Early life and education ==
Breadon grew up in County Fermanagh, Northern Ireland, during The Troubles. She attended Ulster University to study physical therapy. She later worked at the National Health Service. Breadon later attended the defunct Teleosis Homeopathic School in Newton, Massachusetts to study homeopathy.

== Early career ==
Breadon immigrated to Boston in 1995 and worked for Boston Medical Center, The Home for Little Wanderers, and Perkins School for the Blind.

She has a Doctorate of Physical Therapy from Simmons University. Prior to her election to the Boston City Council, she ran a homeopathy business from 2011 to 2020, where she claimed to be board certified in Classical Homeopathy, a pseudoscientific system of alternative medicine.

== City Council ==
After coming in second in a seven-way primary to fill the District 9 seat of retiring incumbent Mark Ciommo, Breadon won the 2019 general municipal election with 58.5% of the vote.

As head of the City Council's Redistricting Committee, Breadon was involved in the controversial redistricting of the City Council districts that occurred after the 2020 United States Census. She sponsored the original "Unity Map" that arose from the redistricting process and passed the city council despite opposition from four white politically moderate Irish American members of the City Council, including Council President Ed Flynn, whose district was one of two that were at the center of the controversy surrounding the map.The map's controversy surrounded changes district 6 and district 7's boundaries. The map was passed into law in November 2022 after being signed by Mayor Michelle Wu. However, the map was ultimately prohibited by preliminary injunction from being used in the 2023 Boston City Council election after a ruling by Federal Judge Patti Saris. After the judicial ruling, City Council President Flynn tasked Councilor Ruthzee Louijeune, head of the Boston City Council's Civil Rights Committee, to oversee the process of drawing a map to be used in the 2023 Boston City Council election instead of Breadon. The resulting map was adopted by the council in a 10–2 vote and signed into law by Mayor Wu.

In June 2023, Breadon was the only white member of the City Council to vote in support of a budget that the City Council approved 7–5. The six other votes in support came from councilors who are persons of color, and all of the votes against the budget came from the remaining white city councilors. Mayor Wu thereafter vetoed a number of amendments included in the budget.

=== Fourth term and council presidency (2026–present) ===
Breadon was re-elected to a fourth term in 2025.

On January 5, 2026, Breadon was voted by the council to serve as its president for the next two years, beating-out Brian Worrell in a 7–6 vote. (Note: Voting for Breadon were: Breadon, Gabriela Coletta Zapata, Sharon Durkan, Ruthzee Louijeune, Enrique Pepen, Henry Santana, Benjamin Weber Voting for Worrell were: Worrell, Miniard Culpepper, John Fitzgerald, Ed Flynn, Julia Mejia, Erin Murphy) Local media characterized Breadon's nomination and victory as a surprise and an upset. After Gabriela Coletta Zapata withdrew her bid for the position on the eve of the vote, Worrell initially appeared to have received pledged support from enough councilors to win him the council presidency. In a surprise, Breadon was nominated by Benjamin Weber and beat Worrell by a single vote. It was claimed that did not have advance knowledge that she would be nominated by Councilor Weber. After the vote, various councilors accused one another of lacking transparency in how they went about the council president election process.

== Personal life ==
Breadon lives in the Oak Square area of Brighton with her spouse, Mary McCarthy.

== Election results ==
=== 2021 ===
Candidates	Preliminary Election		General Election	
Candidates	Votes	%	Votes	%
Liz Breadon	5,050	71.7	7,223	71.9
Michael Bianchi	970	13.8	2,819	28.1
Eric Porter	768	10.9		
Write-ins	252	3.6	TBD	TBD
Total	7,040	100%	TBD	TBD

=== 2019 ===
Candidates	Preliminary Election		General Election	
Candidates	Votes	%	Votes	%
Liz Breadon	1,129	23.55	3,885	58.50
Craig R. Cashman	1,218	25.41	2,728	41.08
Brandon David Bowser	763	15.92		
Daniel J. Daly	656	13.68		
Lee Nave Jr.	466	9.72		
Jonathan Lamar Allen	456	9.51		
Amanda Gail Smart	103	2.15		
Write-in	3	0.06	28	0.42
Total	4,794	100	6,613	100
