= 2025 Boston City Council election =

- November 4, 2025

13 seats on the Boston City Council
	Majority party
Party	Democratic
Last election	13
- Composition of the Boston City Council by political party (Note: Officially nonpartisan)
City Council President before election
Ruthzee Louijeune
Elected City Council President
Liz Breadon

The 2025 Boston City Council election was held on November 4, 2025. A non-partisan preliminary election was held on September 9, 2025, to narrow the field of qualified candidates for each seat to two candidates. All 13 councillors from the nine districts and four councillors at-large were up for election. The election was held concurrently with the 2025 Boston mayoral election. Elections in Boston are officially nonpartisan.

== Election schedule ==
Key dates relating to the election were as follows:

2025 Boston election schedule
August 30	Last day for registration for primary election
September 2	Last day to request mail ballot for primary election
September 9	Preliminary election
October 25	Last day for registration for general election
November 7	General election

== Background ==
This election coincided with the 2025 Boston mayoral election with Incumbent Michelle Wu seeking re-election to a second term. All Members of the Boston City Council have been Democrats since the defeat of Independent At-Large Councilor Althea Garrison, who had automatically ascended to office after the resignation of former At-Large City Councilor Ayanna Pressley to take office as US Representative for Massachusetts's 7th congressional district, by present incumbent Julia Mejia. As such the council is frequently defined as being divided into more Progressive members aligned with the Mayor and Moderate Members of the Council. The progressive members hold a majority and are generally considered to include Ruthzee Louijeune, Julia Mejia, Henry Santana, Gabriela Coletta Zapata, Brian Worrell, Enrique Pepen, and Ben Weber. The more moderate members of the Council are Erin Murphy, Ed Flynn, and John FitzGerald.

Ruthzee Louijeune, council president at the time of the election

== At-large ==
There are four at-large city council seats. Voters in the election could choose up to four candidates, and the top four vote-getters will become the councilors.

=== Declared ===
- Frank Baker, former District 3 councilor (2012–2024)
- Ruthzee Louijeune, incumbent at-large city councilor
- Marvin Mathelier, restauranteur
- Julia Mejia, incumbent at-large city councilor
- Erin Murphy, incumbent at-large city councilor
- Will Onuoha, director of the Mayor's Office of Fair Housing and Equity
- Henry Santana, incumbent at-large city councilor
- Alexandra Valdez, director of the Mayor's Office of Cultural Affairs

=== Eliminated in preliminary election ===
- Yves Mary Jean
- Rachel Miselman

=== Failed to qualify ===
- Reggie Stewart, District 7 director of community relations
- Clifton Braithwaite, 2023 at-large city council candidate

=== Results ===
Candidates	Preliminary election		General election	
Candidates	Votes	%	Votes	%
Ruthzee Louijeune (i)	45,500	18.7	54,885	19.2
Julia M. Mejia (i)	42,245	17.4	47,770	16.7
Erin J. Murphy (i)	38,981	16.0	46,709	16.4
Henry A. Santana (i)	30,670	12.6	44,206	15.5
Frank K. Baker	26,240	10.8	28,526	10.0
Alexandra E. Valdez	18,930	7.8	23,468	8.2
Marvin Mathelier	13,826	5.7	21,101	7.4
Will Onuoha	11,216	4.6	17,540	6.2
Yves Mary Jean	7,419	3.0		
Rachel Miselman	7,134	2.9		
Write-in	988	0.4	1170	0.4
Total	243,149	100	285,375	100
Turnout	93,168		96,405	

== District 1 ==
=== Declared ===
- Andretti R. McDuffie-Stanziani
- Gabriela Coletta Zapata, incumbent city councilor

=== Eliminated in preliminary ===
- Ricardo Rodriguez, realtor

=== Results ===
Candidates	Preliminary election		General election	
Candidates	Votes	%	Votes	%
Gabriela Coletta Zapata (i)	7,021	76.8	7,661	82.5
Andretti McDuffie-Stanziani	1,352	14.8	1,518	16.4
Ricardo Rodriguez	704	7.7		
Write-in	69	0.7	104	1.1
Total	9,146	100	9,283	100
Turnout	10,459		10,267	

== District 2 ==
=== Declared ===
- Charles Delaney, Independent candidate from South Boston
- Ed Flynn, incumbent city councilor

=== Eliminated in preliminary ===
- Brian Foley, South Boston resident and Trump 2024 campaign volunteer

=== Results ===
Candidates	Preliminary election		General election	
Candidates	Votes	%	Votes	%
Ed Flynn (i)	8,250	86.4	8,660	86.6
Charles Delaney	629	6.6	1,214	12.1
Brian Foley	588	6.2		
Write-in	81	0.8	131	1.3
Total	9,548	100	10,005	100
Turnout	11,028		11,225	

== District 3 ==
=== Declared ===
- John FitzGerald, incumbent city councilor
- Lori Kaufmann, candidate for Republican State Committee in 2024
- Barry Lawton, candidate for this district in 2023

=== Results ===
Candidates	General election	
Candidates	Votes	%
John FitzGerald (i)	7,904	98.0
Write-in	165	2.0
Total	8,069	100
Turnout	10,639	

== District 4 ==
=== Declared ===
- Helen Cameron
- Brian Worrell, incumbent city councilor

=== Eliminated in preliminary ===
- Juwan Skeens, candidate for Suffolk's 1st District in 2024

=== Results ===
Candidates	Preliminary election		General election	
Candidates	Votes	%	Votes	%
Brian Worrell (i)	5,773	81.4	6,331	84.4
Helen Cameron	817	11.5	1,119	14.9
Juwan Skeens	457	6.5		
Write-in	43	0.6	50	0.7
Total	7,090	100	7,500	100
Turnout	7,831		8,277	

== District 5 ==
=== Declared ===
- Enrique Pepen, incumbent city councilor
- Winston Pierre, former director of diversity for the City of Boston

=== Eliminated in preliminary ===
- Sharon Hinton, director of Black Teachers Matter

=== Results ===
Candidates	Preliminary election		General election	
Candidates	Votes	%	Votes	%
Enrique Pepen (i)	8,008	63.5	9,101	69.0
Winston Pierre	2,954	23.4	3,994	30.3
Sharon Hinton	1,586	12.6		
Write-in	55	0.4	103	0.8
Total	12,603	100	13,198	100
Turnout	14,022		14,482	

== District 6 ==
=== Declared ===
- Ben Weber, incumbent city councilor
- Stephen Berry, Simmons University history professor

=== Results ===
Candidates	General election	
Candidates	Votes	%
Ben Weber (i)	13,020	86.3
Stephen Berry	1,894	12.5
Write-in	180	1.2
Total	15,094	100
Turnout	18,035	

== District 7 ==
City councilor Tania Fernandes Anderson was first elected in 2021. In December 2024, Fernandes Anderson made national news when she was arrested on charges of corruption, to which she pleaded guilty in May 2025. Part of her plea deal was her resignation from the Boston City Council.

=== Declared ===
- Said Abdirahman Abdikarim, director of outreach for African Community Economic Development of New England (ACEDONE) and 2021 Boston City Council candidate
- Said Ahmed
- Mavrick Afonso, staffer of the Massachusetts Executive Office of Housing and Livable Communities and past city staffer
- Miniard Culpepper, pastor, 2022 candidate for state senate in the 2nd Suffolk district, and 2013 candidate for mayor
- Samuel Hurtado, former advisor to former acting mayor Kim Janey

=== Eliminated in preliminary ===
- Natalie Juba-Sutherland
- Jerome King, past candidate for city council
- Roy Owens, perennial candidate, (Note: Roy Owens is considered a perennial candidate by Boston media. He had run for office many times prior to 2025, including: 19 prior campaigns for Boston City Council 7th district: 1983, 1985, 1987, 1989, 1991, 1993, 1995, 1997, 1999, 2001, 2009 (special election), 2009 (regular election), 2011, 2013, 2015, 2017, 2019, 2021, 2023; 3 campaigns in at-large Boston City Council elections: 2003, 2005, 2021; 1 campaign as the Republican nominee for Massachusetts House of Representatives' 9th Suffolk district in 2024; 1 campaign as an independent candidate for Massachusetts House of Representatives' 5th Suffolk district in 2022; 7 campaigns in Democratic primaries for Massachusetts House 5th Suffolk district: 1988, 2004, 2006, 2008, 2010, 2014, 2018; 3 campaigns in Democratic primaries for Massachusetts Senate's 2nd Suffolk district: 2012, 2014, 2016; 1campaign in a Republican primary for Massachusetts Senate's 1st Suffolk district in 1990; 1 campaign as an independent candidate for Massachusetts's 9th congressional district in 2020), pastor educator, (Note: Roy Owens Owens has previously worked as a teacher in Boston Public Schools and Cathedral High School), former Department of Public Welfare social worker, former Massachusetts Department of Corrections employee

=== Declined ===
- Tania Fernandes Anderson, former city councilor (2022–25)

=== Results ===
Candidates	Preliminary election		General election	
Candidates	Votes	%	Votes	%
Miniard Culpepper	1,112	15.1	3,894	53.3
Said Coach Ahmed	1,170	15.8	3,305	45.2
Mavrick Afonso	1,087	14.7		
Samuel Hurtado	1,061	14.4		
Said Abdirahman Abdikarim	1,057	14.3		
Roy Owens	532	7.2		
Natalie Juba-Sutherland	467	6.3		
Wawa Bell	381	5.2		
Shawn Dwayne Nelson	228	3.1		
Jerome King	144	2.0		
Tchad Akilah Cort	122	1.7		
Write-in	21	0.2	87	1.2
Total	7,382	100	7,308	100
Turnout	8,111		7,989	

== District 8 ==
Incumbent Sharon Durkan ran unopposed, as no other candidates filed by the deadline.

=== Declared ===
- Sharon Durkan, incumbent city councilor

=== Results ===
Candidates	General election	
Candidates	Votes	%
Sharon Durkan (i)	4,898	96.0
Write-in	202	4.0
Total	5,100	100
Turnout	6,821	

== District 9 ==
=== Declared ===
- Liz Breadon, incumbent city councilor
- Pilar Ortiz, law department chief of staff for the City of Boston

=== Results ===
Candidates	General election	
Candidates	Votes	%
Liz Breadon (i)	5,478	68.2
Pilar Ortiz	2,485	31.0
Write-in	64	0.8
Total	'8,027	100
Turnout	8,670	
