= Brian Worrell =

American politician

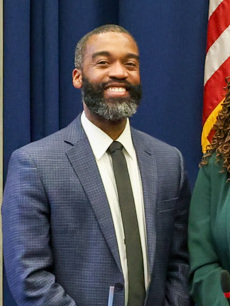
- Worrell in 2023

Member of the Boston City Council from the 4th district
- Incumbent
- Assumed office January 2022
- Preceded by: Andrea Campbell

Personal details
- Party: Democratic
- Relatives: Christopher Worrell (brother)
- Education: Northeastern University

Brian Worrell is an American politician who has represented District 4 on the Boston City Council Since 2022.

== Early life, education, and career ==
Worrell was born to parents who immigrated from Jamaica and Barbados. For school, he participated in METCO, a voluntary school desegregation program in Boston. before enrolling at Northeastern University. He graduated from the university in 2006, having majored in accounting and entrepreneurship.

Worrell worked as a real estate agent. In 2018, Worrell began his own real estate firm in the Dorchester neighborhood of Boston.

Worrell is the brother of Christopher Worrell, a state representative.

== Boston City Council ==
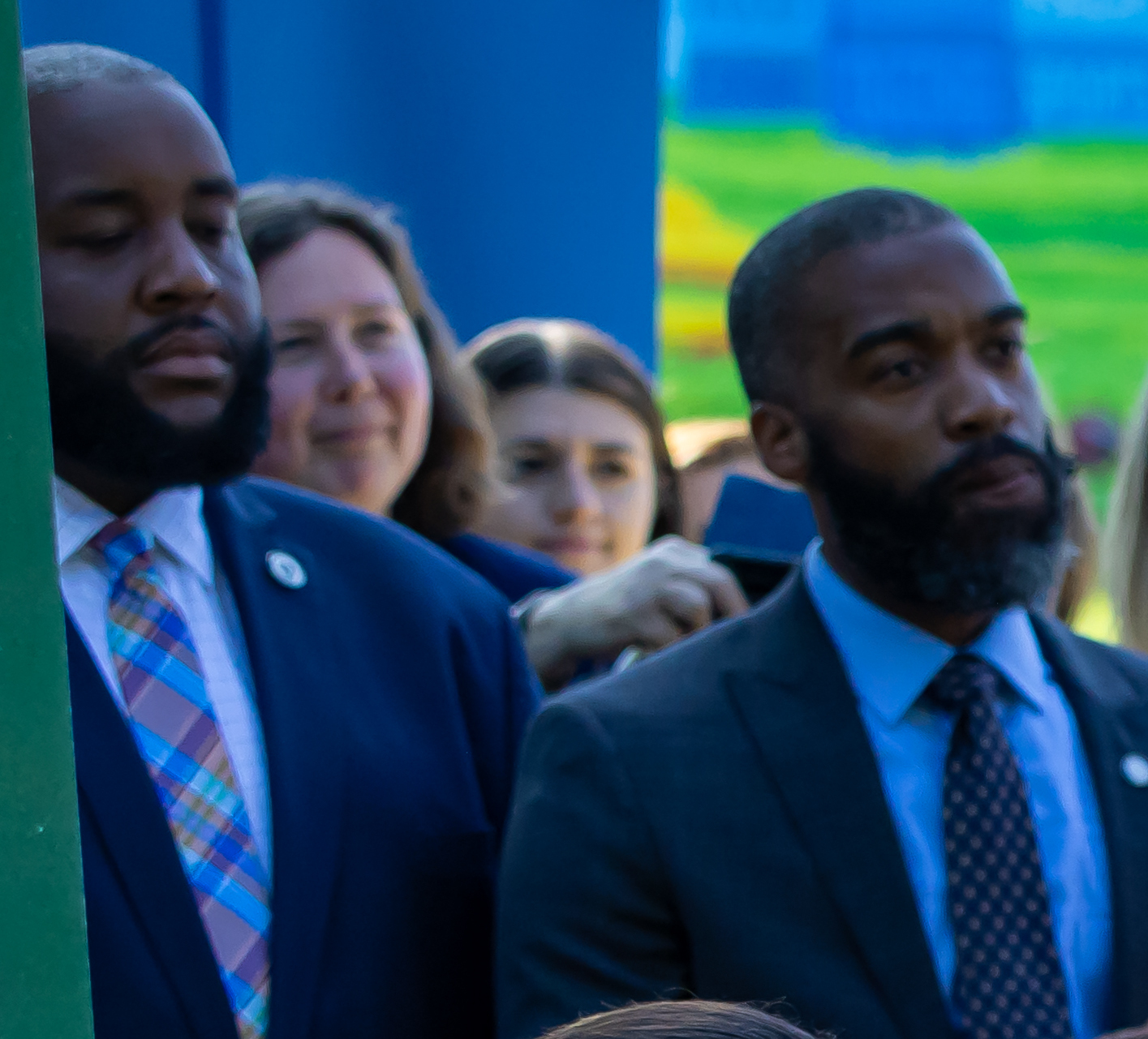
Worrell (right) with his brother Christopher (left) in 2023. Boston Housing Authority Administrator Kenzie Bok is visible behind them.

Since January 2022, Worrell has served as a member of the Boston City Council. He holds the fourth district seat, representing portions of Mattapan, Dorchester, Jamaica Plain, and Roslindale.

While Worrell often votes with the more progressive members of the council, he also has a reputation for "reaching across the aisle" and collaborating with more conservative members.

=== First term (2022–23) ===
Worrell announced his candidacy for the Boston City Council after former District 4 councilor Andrea Campbell announced her candidacy for mayor of Boston. Worrell topped the ticket in the preliminary election, receiving a quarter of the votes cast (2,489 votes). Worrell defeated former state representative Evandro Carvalho in the general election.

When he took office in 2022, Worrell became the first Black man to serve on the council since 2017 (when Tito Jackson's tenure ended).

In March 2023, Worrell and his brother Christopher (a state representative) opened a joint district office in the Dorchester neighborhood as a location where their constituents could be connected with state and city services through their offices.

Worrell and councilors Julia Mejia and Ricardo Arroyo introduced an ordinance to create an Office of Cultural Affairs in the city. While the city council passed the ordinance in October 2023, and was subsequently signed and enacted by Mayor Michelle Wu. The office is situated the city's Equity & Inclusion Cabinet.

=== Second term (2024–25) ===
Worrell was re-elected in 2023.

=== Third term (2026–present) ===
Worrell was re-elected in 2025.

In January 2026, Worrell sought the position of council president. In the council vote for the position, Liz Breadon defeated him in a 7–6 (Note: Voting for Breadon were: Breadon, Gabriela Coletta Zapata, Sharon Durkan, Ruthzee Louijeune, Enrique Pepen, Henry Santana, Benjamin Weber Voting for Worrell were Worrell, Miniard Culpepper, John Fitzgerald, Julia Mejia, Erin Murphy) vote. Supporters of his bid for the role touted that he would be a more independent "check and balance" on the administration of Mayor Michelle Wu.
