= Gabriela Coletta Zapata =

American politician

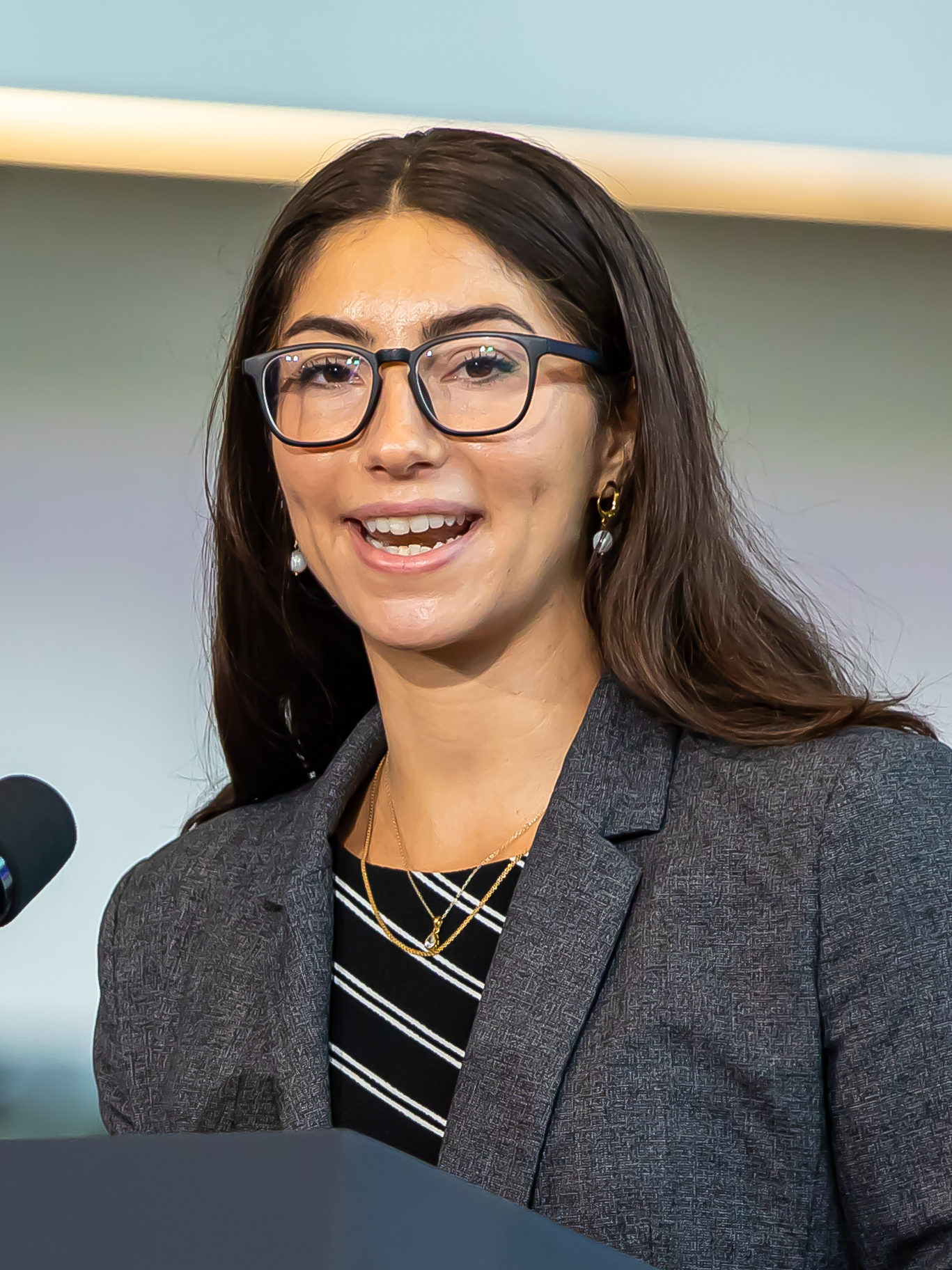
- Coletta in 2023

Member of the Boston City Council from the 1st district
- Incumbent
- Assumed office May 18, 2022
- Preceded by: Lydia Edwards

Personal details
- Born: Gabriela Coletta Boston, Massachusetts, U.S.
- Party: Democratic
- Spouse: Sebastian Zapata (m. 2024)
- Education: West Virginia University; University of Massachusetts Boston (BA)
- Website: Campaign website

Gabriela "Gigi" Coletta Zapata is an American politician who represents District 1 on the Boston City Council. She was first elected on May 3, 2022. Prior to being elected to the Boston City Councilor, Gabriela Coletta served as Chief of Staff for former City Councilor Lydia Edwards until 2021 and then went on to serve as External Relations Manager for the New England Aquarium.

== Early life and education ==
Gabriela Coletta was born and raised in the Eagle Hill Historic District of East Boston. Her parents were local journalists, and would bring her with them to many local events. She attended four different public schools before graduating from Boston Latin Academy. She then attended the University of Massachusetts Boston, graduating with a bachelor's degree in political science.

== Early career ==
Zapata's first involvement in politics was as a volunteer for Obama's re-election campaign while she was attending college. She later worked on Adrian Madaro's campaign for state representative in 2015 as field director. After his victory, she was hired by Madaro as a community liaison. She was then the associate director of the Massachusetts Women's Political Caucus, a nonprofit seeking to support pro-choice women running for office, until she left to become campaign manager for Lydia Edwards in 2017. When Edwards took her seat on the Boston City Council, she hired Zapata as her chief of staff, a position she held for three and a half years. In mid-2021, she left this position in order to accept a position as the external relations manager of the New England Aquarium

== Boston City Council ==
In 2022, Zapata (at the time still known by her maiden name) ran in a special election to fill the council seat that Edwards had vacated upon her election to the state senate. Voter turnout in the special election was low with only 4,923 ballots being cast; Zapata garnered about 57% of the votes, Tania del Rio received 33%, and Jorge Mendoza (who ran as a write-in candidate) got 10% of the votes. During her campaign, Zapata prioritized the need for more affordable housing in Boston's North End, East Boston and Charlestown neighborhoods. Zapata was re-elected in 2023, running unopposed. She received 94.7% of the vote. She was re-elected in 2023 and 2025

As a city councilor, Zapata started an anti-trash initiative in District 1. The initiative sought to reduce litter by increasing access to trash barrels, expanding civic waste awareness, and called for investments in funding for more community waste clean-ups.

Soon after her 2025 re-election, rumors surfaced that both Coletta Zapata and Brian Worrell were privately campaigning among councilors and councilors-elect for votes needed to be made council president for the council term beginning in January 2026. On November 5, Councilor Julia Mejia publicly announced (via social media) that she would be campaigning for the position, claiming she wanted to bring a more democratic and publicly transparent approach to the process of campaigning for council president (which traditionally occurs through closed-door campaigning for support). On November 11, Coletta Zapata announced that she indeed intended to be a candidate for council president, and claimed to have secured pledges of support from the necessary number of councilors to elect her such in January. Worrell and Mejia both disclosed that they intended to continue pursuing the presidency. In a surprise development, Colleta Zapata withdrew her candidacy on the eve of the council vote, leaving Worrell as the apparent front-runner to win the presidency (appearing to have secured pledges from enough councilors in the hours that followed her withdrawal). However, in a further surprise, Liz Breadon was nominated at the last-minute and defeated Worrell in a 7–6 council vote, with Zapata voting for Breadon.

== Personal life ==
In May 2024, she married Sebastian Zapata in a ceremony at Glen Magna Farms in Danvers, Massachusetts. Attorney General Andrea Campbell officiated the ceremony. In November 2025, Coletta Zapata announced that she is pregnant with her first child.
