= 2023 Boston City Council election =

- November 7, 2023

13 seats on the Boston City Council
	Majority party
Party	Democratic
Last election	13
- Composition of the Boston City Council by political party (Note: Officially nonpartisan)
City Council President before election
Ed Flynn
Elected City Council President
Ruthzee Louijeune

The 2023 Boston City Council election was held on November 7, 2023, with primaries occurring on September 12, 2023. All thirteen councillors from the nine districts and four councillors at-large were up for election. Elections in Boston are officially nonpartisan.

Two councillors, Michael F. Flaherty and Frank Baker, did not seek re-election. Of the 11 members of the council seeking re-election, nine were successful, while Ricardo Arroyo (District 5) and Kendra Lara (District 6) were defeated.

== Election schedule ==
Key dates relating to the election were as follows:

2023 Boston election schedule
September 2	Last day for registration for primary election
September 5	Last day to request mail ballot for primary election
September 12	Preliminary election
October 28	Last day for registration for general election
October 31	Last day to request mail ballot for general election
November 7	General election

== Summary ==
The council members at the time of both the preliminary election and general election are listed below. The table further indicates if each incumbent ran for re-election, and if so, whether they were re-elected or not.

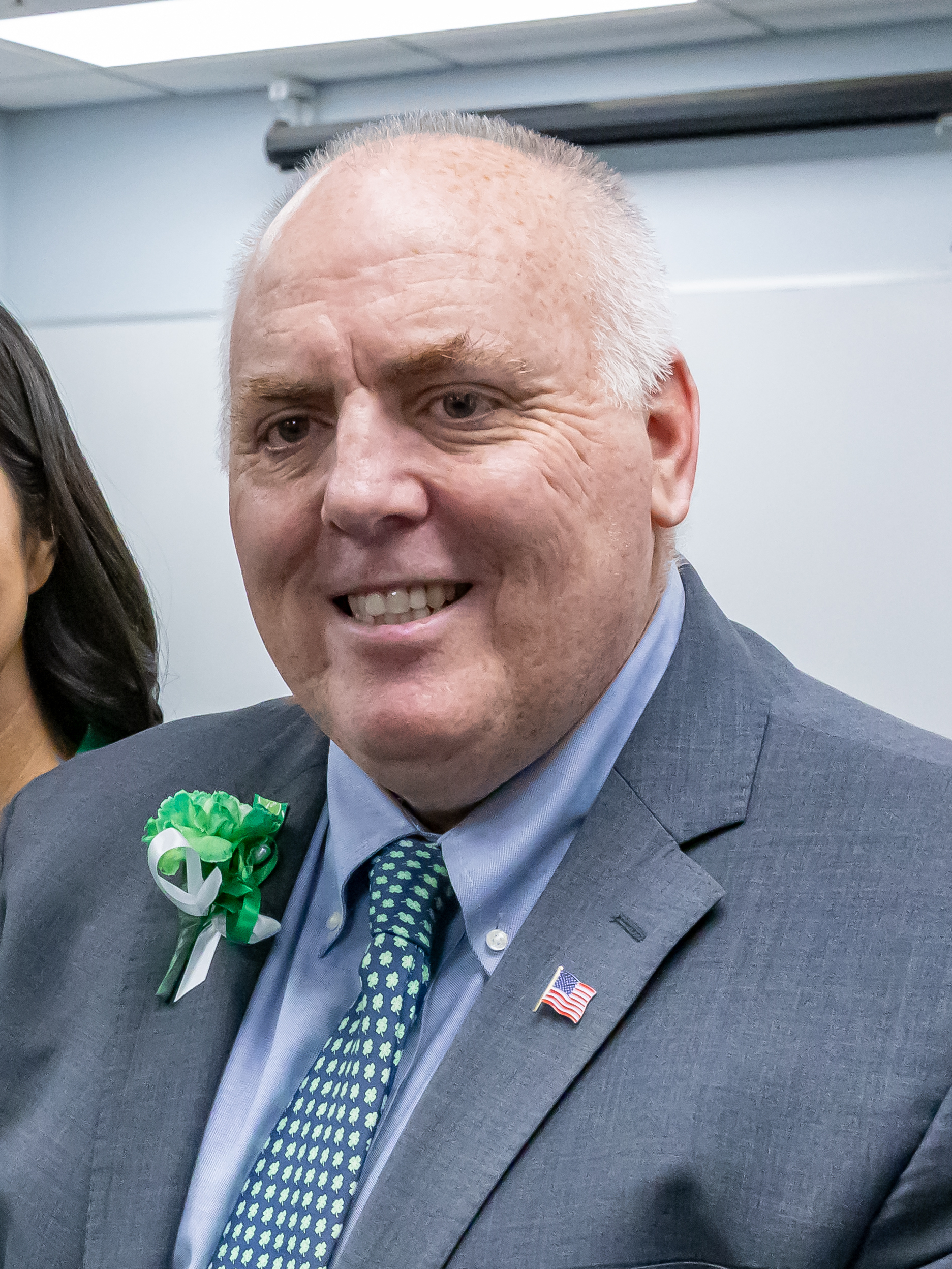
Ed Flynn, council president at the time of the election

District	Incumbent	Ran	Result
At-large	Michael F. Flaherty	No	Retired
At-large	Ruthzee Louijeune	Yes	Re-elected
At-large	Julia Mejia	Yes	Re-elected
At-large	Erin Murphy	Yes	Re-elected
1	Gabriela Coletta	Yes	Re-elected
2	Ed Flynn †	Yes	Re-elected
3	Frank Baker	No	Retired
4	Brian Worrell	Yes	Re-elected
5	Ricardo Arroyo	Yes	Lost
6	Kendra Lara	Yes	Lost
7	Tania Fernandes Anderson	Yes	Re-elected
8	Sharon Durkan	Yes	Re-elected
9	Liz Breadon	Yes	Re-elected

† Council President

== Results ==
=== At-large ===
2023 Boston City Council at-large election
Candidate	General election	
Candidate	Votes	%
Ruthzee Louijeune (incumbent)	44,479	20.31
Erin Murphy (incumbent)	43,383	19.81
Julia Mejia (incumbent)	39,656	18.10
Henry Santana	34,014	15.53
Bridget Nee-Walsh	26,674	12.18
Shawn Nelson	10,448	4.77
Clifton Braithwaite	10,236	4.67
Catherine Vitale	8,503	3.88
Write-ins	1,657	3.88
Total	219,050	100

=== District 1 ===
Lydia Edwards, who won the District 1 seat in the 2021 general election, resigned from the Council at the end of April 2022 and was later elected to the Massachusetts Senate. Gabriela Coletta won a special election in May 2022 to serve the remainder of Edwards' term. Incumbent Coletta then ran unopposed for election to a full term.

2023 Boston City Council District 1 election
Candidates	General Election	
Candidates	Votes	%
Gabriela Coletta (incumbent)	5,725	95.62
Write-ins	262	4.38
Total	5,987	100

=== District 2 ===
2023 Boston City Council District 2 election
Candidates	General Election	
Candidates	Votes	%
Ed Flynn (incumbent)	7,552	97.81
Write-ins	169	2.19
Total	7,721	100

=== District 3 ===
2023 Boston City Council District 3 election
Candidate	Primary election		General election	
Candidate	Votes	%	Votes	%
John FitzGerald	2,777	43.07	5,133	58.24
Joel Richards	1,237	19.19	3,650	41.41
Ann Walsh	1,151	17.85		
Matthew Patton	550	8.53		
Jennifer Johnson	271	4.20		
Barry Lawton	237	3.68		
Rosalind Wornum	213	3.30		
Write-ins	11	0.17	31	0.35
Total	6,447	100	8,814	100

=== District 4 ===
2023 Boston City Council District 4 election
Candidates	General Election	
Candidates	Votes	%
Brian Worrell (incumbent)	4,656	97.51
Write-ins	119	2.49
Total	4,775	100

=== District 5 ===
2023 Boston City Council District 5 election
Candidate	Primary election		General election	
Candidate	Votes	%	Votes	%
Enrique Pepén	3,047	40.42	5,781	52.75
Jose Ruiz	2,302	30.53	5,134	46.84
Ricardo Arroyo (incumbent)	1,397	18.53		
Jean-Claude Sanon	766	10.16		
Write-ins	27	0.36	45	0.41
Total	7,539	100	10,960	100

=== District 6 ===
2023 Boston City Council District 6 election
Candidate	Primary election		General election	
Candidate	Votes	%	Votes	%
Benjamin Weber	4,951	42.25	9,451	60.70
William King	4,384	37.42	6,089	38.74
Kendra Lara (incumbent)	2,351	20.06		
Write-ins	31	0.26	88	0.56
Total	9,849	100	15,718	100

=== District 7 ===
2023 Boston City Council District 7 election
Candidate	Primary election		General election	
Candidate	Votes	%	Votes	%
Tania Fernandes Anderson (incumbent)	1,448	57.46	3,719	70.36
Althea Garrison	521	20.67	1,500	28.45
Roy Owens Sr.	238	9.44		
Jerome King	200	7.94		
Padma Scott	71	2.82		
Write-ins	42	1.67	63	1.19
Total	2,520	100	5,273	100

=== District 8 ===
Kenzie Bok, who had won the District 8 seat in the 2021 general election, resigned in April 2023 to take a position in the Boston Housing Authority. Sharon Durkan was then elected to the District 8 seat in a July 2023 special election. Incumbent Durkan then ran for election to a full term.

2023 Boston City Council District 8 election
Candidates	General Election	
Candidates	Votes	%
Sharon Durkan (incumbent)	3,818	70.70
Montez Haywood	1,546	28.63
Write-ins	36	0.67
Total	5,400	100

=== District 9 ===
2023 Boston City Council District 9 election
Candidates	General Election	
Candidates	Votes	%
Liz Breadon (incumbent)	4,399	65.95
Jacob deBlecourt	2,222	33.31
Write-ins	49	0.73
Total	6,670	100
