= Tania Fernandes Anderson =

American politician (born 1979)

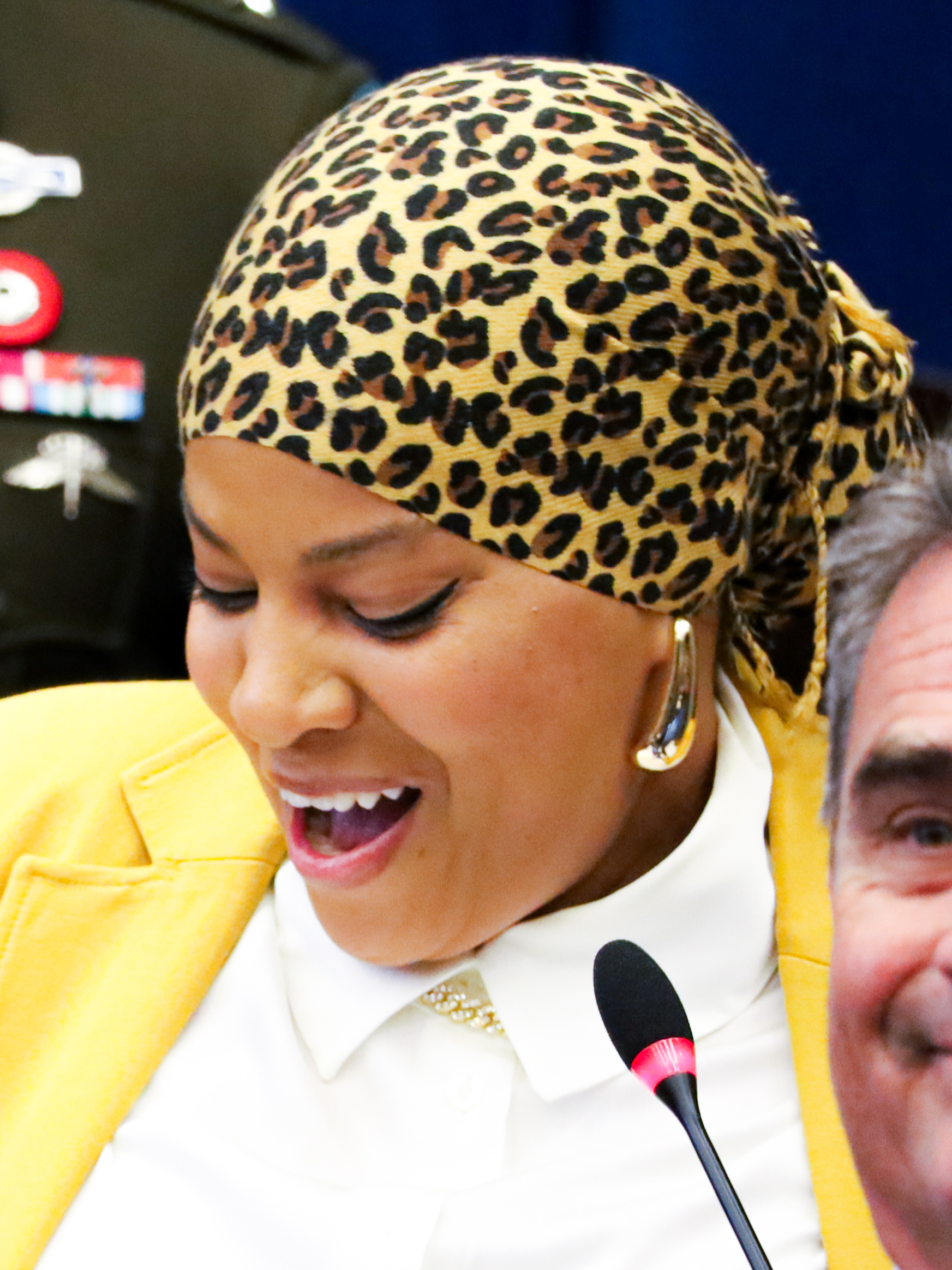
- Fernandes Anderson in 2023

Member of the Boston City Council from the 7th district
- In office January 4, 2022 – July 4, 2025
- Preceded by: Kim Janey
- Succeeded by: Miniard Culpepper

Personal details
- Born: January 4, 1979 (age 47) Praia, Santiago, Cape Verde
- Party: Democratic
- Website: Campaign website

Tania Fernandes Anderson (born January 4, 1979) is a Cape Verdean-born American politician, non-profit executive, and convicted felon. She has served as a member of the Boston City Council, representing the 7th district, since 2022. A Democrat, she was elected in 2021 to succeed Kim Janey and represented Roxbury, Dorchester and part of the South End. She was the first practicing Muslim and first former undocumented immigrant elected to the Council.

In December 2024, she was indicted and charged with five federal criminal offenses related to a kickback scheme involving the theft of taxpayer money. In April 2025, she agreed to plead guilty and step down from the council. In June, she formally tendered her resignation from the council, which took effect after July 4.

== Early life and career ==
Fernandes Anderson was born in Praia, Cape Verde. She immigrated to the United States at the age of ten, settling in the Boston neighborhood of Roxbury. She graduated from John D. O'Bryant High School. She was formerly an illegal immigrant. She is the executive director of Bowdoin Geneva Main Streets, a non-profit supporting small businesses. In 2019, Fernandes Anderson became an American citizen.

== Boston City Council ==
Elected in November 2021, Fernandes Anderson took office in January 2022. Her tenure has been described as one in which she was "a powerful representative of the city's routinely marginalized voices" but also that "she has accomplished little besides picking a lot of pointless fights."

Fernandes Anderson is the first Muslim, the first immigrant from the continent of Africa, and the first former undocumented immigrant to serve on the city council. She represents the seventh district, which covers large portions of Roxbury and Dorchester neighborhoods, as well as smaller portions of the South End and Fenway neighborhoods.

=== First term (2022–23) ===
==== Budget amendments ====
In her first term, Fernandes Anderson chaired the Ways and Means Committee, which has a purview centered on budget-related legislation. Due to its central role in the city's budgeting process, this chairmanship is considered a powerful post. It was said, "she pretty quickly seemed overwhelmed in the role." She was later removed from the chairmanship by her colleagues.

In June 2023, the city council voted 7–5 to approve an operating budget for the following fiscal year as it had been amended by the committee. Many of the amendments that the committee had made to the budget faced heavy criticism from dissenting council members. A majority of the budget amendments were vetoed by Mayor Michelle Wu, including amendments which would have resulted in decreased funding for the city's Office of Veterans Services and its police department, an amendment aimed at increasing citizen input in budgeting, as well as decreased funding for the city's Transportation Department, Public Works Department, and the Boston Public Library. After Wu's vetoes, the city council held votes on overriding six of the vetoes, but only secured the necessary threshold to override a single veto.

Fernandes Anderson publicly claimed that she was not responsible for several of the more controversial cuts. Fellow councilor Erin Murphy characterized Fernandes Anderson's rejection of responsibility as dishonest, arguing that Fernandes Anderson's power as committee chair had given her a "final say" as to which amendments would advance.

==== Gaza War ====
Fernandes Anderson was vocal on the Gaza war. At an October 18, 2023 city council hearing where resolutions were presented about the 2023 Hamas-led attack on Israel and Gaza war more broadly, Anderson made comments calling for a return of hostages taken by Hamas and an immediate ceasefire by both sides and introduced a resolution calling for an immediate de-escalation and ceasefire. She was criticized for characterizing the Hamas-led attack as a "military operation" rather than an act of terrorism in her resolution. Councilors Frank Baker and Sharon Durkan opposed holding an immediate vote on Fernandes Anderson's ordinance, and it was referred to the committee of the whole. In December 2023, Fernandes Anderson awarded a citation purportedly from the entire city council to two Boston Public Schools students praising them for a pro-Palestine student walkout that they had organized in Boston schools. The students were then, at the invite of Fernandes Anderson, given time to make a presentation and proceeded to make remarks that were characterized as being "divisive". Numerous councilors reported having felt "blindsided" by the citation and presentation, including Council President Ed Flynn. Flynn claimed that Fernandes Anderson had not accurately informed him as to what the citation and presentation related to and that he would not have consented to either had he been familiar. Flynn claimed that the presentation went against the council's practice of disallowing presentations by outside individuals on controversial topics.

==== Other resolutions introduced ====
In June 2022, the Boston City Council unanimously adopted a resolution introduced by Fernandes Anderson and Councilors Kendra Lara and Ruthzee Louijeune which apologized for the city's historical role in the Atlantic slave trade.

In October 2022, Fernandes Anderson offered a resolution calling for "Boston's Hijab Day", in recognition of Mahsa Amini, a 22-year-old woman who died while in the custody of Iranian authorities. Amini had been arrested for improperly wearing the hijab (which Iran's government mandates women wear). Fernandes Anderson intended for the resolution to "call for the freedom of women's self-expression to cover or not cover their hair, for the women of Iran and across the world". Fernandes Anderson's proposal received international media attention, with heavy criticism finding her choice to use the name "Hijab Day" to commemorate Amini. The council declined to use this name, and instead agreed to a different resolution text that instead commemorates September 23 (Amini's birthday) as the "Day of Woman, Life and Freedom".

=== Second term (2024–2025) ===
Fernandes Anderson was reelected in November 2023, defeating a challenge by Althea Garrison, a perennial candidate and former officeholder. When the oath of office was being administered collectively to city councilors by Mayor Michelle Wu at the January 1, 2024 inaugural meeting of new council term, Fernandes Anderson failed both to raise her hand and verbally recite the oath. A video showing Fernandes Anderson's failure to perform her oath of office went viral after being posted to the Libs of TikTok account on X, with the account's post including commentary accusing Fernandes of hating the United States. She responded that she had "internalized" the oath with a private prayer, and called commentary on it "anti-immigrant racist vitriol." However, because the Boston City Charter requires that city councilors recite their oath of office in order to serve, Mayor Wu and the city government declared that Anderson's tenure on the council had lapsed and ordered that city council records be amended to discount Fernandes Anderson's vote on the selection of Ruthzee Louijeune as council president, since Fernandes Anderson had not been eligible to cast any council votes (the choice of Louijeune as council president had been unanimous, therefore this had no material impact). Fernandes Anderson was allowed to re-assume her office as a city councilor after taking her oath on January 4, 2024.

In her second term, Fernandes Anderson has served as chair of the council's Arts Committee and Civil Rights Committee. In February 2024, Fernandes Anderson introduced a request to hold a hearing to explore the possibility of Boston adopting congestion pricing for access to the city by motor vehicles. Fernandes Anderson touted congestion pricing as a possible solution to alleviate traffic woes on the city's roadways. In November 2024, she signed-on as a sponsor of a resolution proposed by councilors Ed Flynn and Erin Murphy that would have recommended that the city's election department be placed under state receivership. However, she ultimately abstained from the vote, which saw the bill fail 2–7 (with four abstentions in total).

On August 2, 2023, Fernandes Anderson was a robbery victim in the area of Boston known as Mass. and Cass. While she was surveying an area populated by homeless people, a man grabbed her cell phone and ran away. After summoning the police, officers conducted a search of the homeless encampment, recovered the phone, and returned it to her. Fernandes Anderson subsequently criticized the Boston Police for allowing details of the crime to be made public. She also criticized the media for reporting the incident, calling it "propaganda."

==== Criminal plea and resignation ====
After Fernandes Anderson's December 2024 arrest on federal corruption charges, Mayor Wu, Council President Louijeune, and several other councilors (including Durkan, Flynn, Murphy, and Gabriela Coletta Zapata) publicly called for Fernandes Anderson to resign her seat. She initially defied this pressure. However, in early April 2025 Fenandes Anderson disclosed that she had agreed with federal prosecutors to resign her seat as part of a plea bargain. She signed the plea deal on April 7, and federal prosecutors filed the plea in court the following day.

Fernandes Anderson did not immediately tender her resignation after announcing that she had agreed to plead guilty, and attended the first council meeting held subsequent to this announcement. In the week that followed this, Council President Louijeuene asked the city's corporation counsel to provide clarification on whether rules would allow the council to remove Fernandes Anderson from office. The corporation council opined that rules would not enable them to do so until after Fernandes Anderson formally receives her criminal sentencing, which is scheduled for July 29. In mid-June, Fernandes Andreson submitted her resignation, which will take effect after July 4.

Eleven candidates have qualified to run for Fernandes Anderson's seat in the regularly scheduled 2025 city council election. No special election for the seat is scheduled to occur before the November election. Officials in Boston have indicated that they hope arrangements can be made to seat the winner of the November election immediately after certification of the result, in order to prevent the seat from remaining vacant all the way through January.

== Legal issues ==
=== Conflict of interest concerns ===
In July 2023, Fernandes Anderson admitted guilt and agreed to pay a $5,000 civil penalty after violating conflict of interest laws by hiring her sister and son to paid positions on her Boston City Council staff, according to the Massachusetts State Ethics Commission. After her 2021 election to the Boston City Council, Fernandes Anderson appointed her sister as her full-time Director of Constituent Services. She initially set her sister's salary at $65,000 and then approved an increase to $70,000 in 2022, while also giving her sister a $7,000 bonus, according to the disposition agreement signed by Fernandes Anderson. She had been advised she could not hire family members prior to being sworn in.

In 2022, she also appointed her son as her office manager at an annual salary of $52,000 and then less than two weeks later, gave her son a pay raise to $70,000. In a statement released to the public, State Ethics Commission executive director David Wilson said, "Fernandes Anderson's actions as a Boston City Councilor concerning the appointment and compensation of her sister and son violated the conflict of interest law's prohibition against municipal employees participating in their official capacity in matters in which they know members of their immediate family have a financial interest." Both her sister and her son's employment were terminated in August 2022.

Anderson later said on social media that "I messed up and should have paid attention to those [ethics] training videos."

=== Campaign finance violations ===
In November 2024, Fernandes Anderson received a citation for failing to report $32,900 worth of campaign contributions, and for taking contributions that exceeded state limits.

=== Kickback charges ===
On December 6, 2024, FBI special agents in Boston arrested Anderson on public corruption charges. She was indicted on five counts of aiding and abetting wire fraud. She was also accused of one count of aiding and abetting theft of federal monies in connection with a kickback scheme.

According to the indictment, Anderson hired a relative to work in her City Hall office. She then gave that employee, who she falsely denied was related to her, a $13,000 raise in return for the employee giving Anderson $7,000 in cash in a City Hall bathroom. At the time, Anderson was facing financial difficulties, was late on her rent, was missing car payments, was overdrafting her bank account, and had a $5,000 penalty from the state Ethics Commission for hiring other relatives to her staff. She agreed in April 2025 to plead guilty to one count of wire fraud and one count of theft, and to step down from the council. She was sentenced to one month in prison, to be followed by three years of supervised release and was also ordered to pay $13,000 in restitution.

== Personal life ==
Fernandes Anderson has been a foster mother of 17 children. In a 2023 council meeting, Fernandes Anderson mentioned that one of her sons has served in the United States Marine Corps. Fernandes Anderson is a practicing Sunni Muslim.

Fernandes Anderson is married to Tanzerious Anderson, who has been incarcerated for murder.

== Electoral history ==
2021 Boston City Council 7th district election
| Candidate | Preliminary election | | General election | |
| Candidate | Votes | % | Votes | % |
|---|---|---|---|---|
| Tania Anderson | 2,014 | 26.7 | 7,062 | 73.0 |
| Roy Owens Sr. | 1,284 | 17.0 | 2,562 | 26.5 |
| Angelina Comacho | 1,256 | 16.6 | | |
| Brandy Brooks | 741 | 9.8 | | |
| Lorraine Wheeler | 697 | 9.2 | | |
| Santiago Rivera | 568 | 7.5 | | |
| Marisa Luse | 550 | 7.3 | | |
| Joao DePina | 407 | 5.4 | | |
| Write-ins | 34 | 0.5 | 45 | 0.5 |
| Total | 7,551 | 100 | 10,661 | 100 |

2023 Boston City Council 7th district election
| Candidate | Votes | % |
|---|---|---|
| Tania Fernandes Anderson (incumbent) | 3,710 | 70.36 |
| Althea Garrison | 1,500 | 28.45 |
| Write-in | 63 | 1.19 |
| Total votes | 5,273 | 100 |
