= Kendra Lara =

Dominican-American politician

Kendra Hicks-Lara

Member of the Boston City Council from the 6th district
- In office January 3, 2022 – January 1, 2024
- Preceded by: Matt O'Malley
- Succeeded by: Benjamin Weber

Personal details
- Born: Kendra Lara Dominican Republic
- Party: Democratic

Kendra Hicks (née Lara) is an American politician. She previously served on the Boston City Council for the 6th district and is a member of the Democratic party. Lara is a socialist.

== City Council ==
Lara was elected to the City Council in 2021. While she had campaigned for office under her married name Kendra Hicks, she decided to utilize her maiden name "Kendra Lara" when she joined the Boston City Council.

In June 2022, the Boston City Council unanimously adopted a resolution introduced by Lara and Councilors Tania Fernandes Anderson and Ruthzee Louijeune which apologized for the city's historical role in the Atlantic slave trade.

Lara and her City Council colleague Ruthzee Louijeune authored a resolution that was passed by the Boston City Council in late 2022 which urged Mayor Michelle Wu to raise the affordable housing unit requirements for new residential developments from 13% to 20% and to lower the threshold for which the requirements apply from buildings with nine or more units to buildings with five or more. The resolution also urged Wu to transition from utilizing HUD-designated area median income and to instead determine base affordability based upon the average income of a neighborhood.

In 2023, a city council attorney filed an internal complaint against Lara and fellow councilors Ricardo Arroyo and Julia Mejia accusing all three of bullying and lambasting her during an April meeting.

In 2023 Lara ran for reelection to the city council and lost in the primaries.

=== Vehicle crash ===
On June 30, 2023, Lara was involved in a car crash in which she and her seven-year-old son were injured. Lara's car went through a fence and yard and hit a porch in Jamaica Plain. According to the initial Boston Police report, she had swerved to avoid another car. Police later estimated that she was driving at least 53 miles per hour when she swerved to avoid the other car. Lara was cited for driving an unregistered car without a license; she was also referred for not having a booster seat for her son. According to the Boston Herald, Lara's license was revoked due to an outstanding traffic ticket in Connecticut in 2014. The driver of the other car contradicted much of Lara’s account of the crash, as he stated Lara was speeding and he was stopped at the time when he noticed her car swerve and crashed into a house. On July 19, 2023, Lara was arraigned in West Roxbury District Court where she pleaded not guilty to charges of driving with a suspended license, reckless operation of a motor vehicle, operating an unregistered and uninsured vehicle; speeding, and a seat belt violation. During the arraignment, the judge ruled that Lara should face two more charges: operating negligently so as to endanger and recklessly permitting bodily injury to a child under 14. She was released on personal recognizance and scheduled for a pre-trial conference on August 16, 2023.

Lara was widely criticized by other local elected officials following the crash. Fellow council member Michael Flaherty called for her resignation saying, "[Lara's] behavior is one of habitual scofflaw, and to go 10 years without a license isn't a mistake, it's the middle finger, frankly."

On October 20, 2023, three of the seven charges filed against Lara were dismissed at the request of the prosecutor: speeding, reckless operation and driving without a seatbelt.

On August 8, 2024 Lara entered a plea deal which dismissed four of the charges in exchange for a guilty plea on the charge of driving with a suspended license. Lara was also found responsible for not having a booster seat for her son during the crash. Lara was sentenced to probation and ordered to write an apology letter to the 84-year old woman whose house was severely damaged in the crash. The charge of negligent driving was continued with provision to be dismissed in a year.

=== Residency allegations ===
On August 2, 2023, the Boston Ballot Law Commission held a hearing to determine if Lara lived in district 6, the district that she represents as a member of the city council. Following a vehicle accident in July 2023, media outlets claimed they were unable to verify Lara's residency, as she was found to have lived at several addresses in recent years. Several of her constituents from district 6 subsequently challenged her residency, claiming that she had provided two addresses and two different names on legal documents during the past year. Lara told the commission that she had changed her addresses during divorce proceedings and provided proof of her current residence in district 6. The elections commission found that the residents challenging her residency did not meet their burden of proof.

== Electoral history ==
2021 Boston City Council election
Candidate	Primary election		General election	
Candidate	Votes	%	Votes	%
Kendra Hicks	9,236	50.2	13,907	55.9
Mary Tamer	7,984	43.4	10,974	44.1
Winnie Eke	1,188	6.5		
Write-ins	76	0.4	TBD	TBD
Total	18,408	100%	24,881	100%

2023 Boston City Council election
Candidate	Primary election	
Candidate	Votes	%
Benjamin Jacob Weber	4,983	42.1
William King	4,405	37.2
Kendra Lara	2,371	20.0
Write-ins	34	0.3
Total	11,828	100%
