= Frank Baker (Boston politician) =

American politician (born 1967)

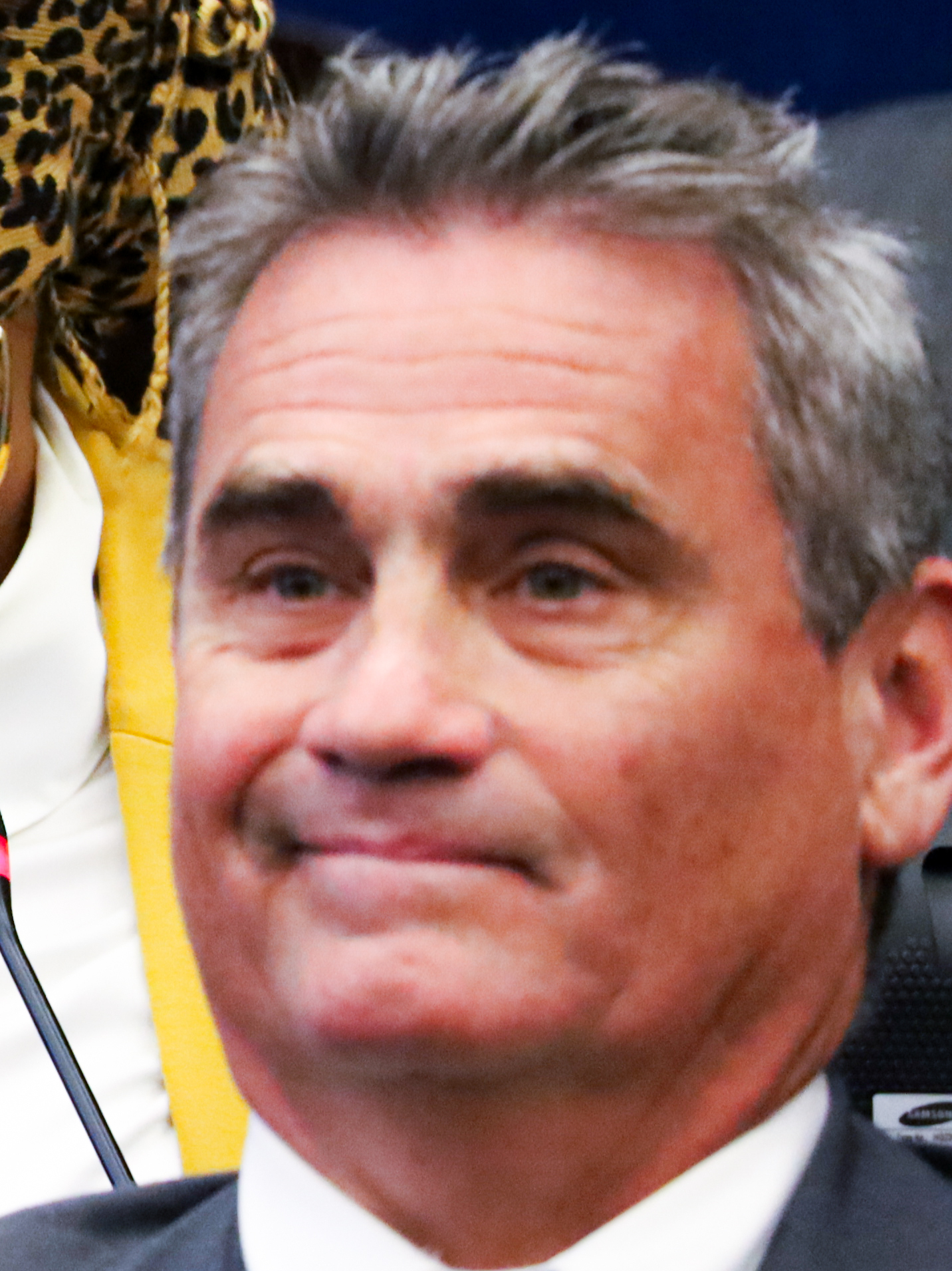
- Baker in 2023

Member of the Boston City Council from the 3rd district
- In office January 2012 – January 1, 2024
- Preceded by: Maureen Feeney
- Succeeded by: John FitzGerald

Personal details
- Born: Francis K Baker; October 27, 1967 (age 58) Massachusetts, United States
- Party: Democratic
- Children: 2 (twins)
- Education: Don Bosco Technical High School
- Profession: Printer, politician

Francis K. Baker (born 27 October 1967) is an American politician who represented District 3 on the Boston City Council from 2012 until 2024.

== Personal life ==
Baker is the 12th child of John and Eileen Baker, and was raised in Saint Margaret's Parish (now St. Teresa of Calcutta), which is better known as the Savin Hill section of Dorchester. He graduated in 1986 from Don Bosco Technical High School where he has studied printing trade. Between 1987 and 2010 he worked in the printing department at the City of Boston. He is a member of the CWA/Boston Typographical Union. He is married to his wife, Today Baker, and they have two children.

== Boston City Council ==
From 2012 to 2024, Baker served six terms on the Boston City Council. Baker is affiliated with the Democratic Party, and was regarded to be one of the council's more conservative members. He has sometimes been alternatively been described as a political moderate. Baker long was a member of the council's unofficial conservative/centrist bloc,

=== Committee assignments ===
Baker served as the chair of the Jobs, Wages, and Workforce Development Committee and the Special Committee on Charter Reform. He also served as vice chair of the Planning, Development and Transportation Committee; as well as a member of the committees on Census and Redistricting; City, Neighborhood Services and Veterans Affairs; Government Operations; Homelessness; Mental Health and Recovery; Housing and Community Development; and Ways and Means; Arts and Film, Humanities and Tourism.

=== First term (2012–13) ===
Baker was first elected to the Boston City Council representing District 3 in 2011. Incumbent District 3 Council Maureen Feeney declined to run for reelection, and a large field of candidates ran to replace her. Baker faced John O'Toole in the general election, with Baker running out of the northern part of the district in Savin Hill, and O'Toole drawing his support from the southern part of the district in Adams Village and Neponset. The race was widely seen at the time as a contest between then-Mayor Thomas Menino and State Representative and Boston Building Trades' chief Marty Walsh, with Menino backing O'Toole, and Walsh backing Baker. Baker won, receiving 5,262 votes to O'Toole's 4,120.

In December 2012, Connolly was one of four councilors who voted against an ordinance which created a requirement that residential rental units be inspected every five years, with the owners of "problem properties" receiving $300 fines if added to a "chronic offender registry". Over Baker's vote against it, the ordinance passed 12–4, and was signed into law by Mayor Thomas Menino.

After Michelle Wu became mayor of Boston in late 2021, Baker frequently voted against her initiatives. During Wu's early mayoralty: Baker, Michael F. Flaherty, Ed Flynn, and Erin Murphy formed the council's de facto conservative/moderate bloc.

=== Second term (2014–15) ===
Baker was re-elected to a second term in 2013.

=== Third term (2016–17) ===
Baker was re-elected to a third term in 2015.

In 2016, while chairing the Charter Reform Committee, Baker proposed that council members serve four year terms, not two year terms. His arguments include that the members running for reelection spent much of the second year running and not focusing on the Council and that the city could save approximately $1.6 million by not having elections in low turn out years. The council vote 8–1 in favor but at the time, it was not clear what Mayor Marty Walsh thought about the proposal. He would need to sign off on the proposal and send it to the State House for a vote in order for it to take effect. In late-2016, Baker and Councilor Bill Linehan introduced a proposed resolution that would impose a 2% tax on the sale of alcoholic beverages in order to raise an estimated $20 million annually that would be allocated to services and initiatives to treat and prevent substance abuse. The ordinance was defeated in a council vote of 10–3, with only Council President Michelle Wu joining Linehan and Baker in voting in support of the ordinance.

=== Fourth term (2018–19) ===
Baker was re-elected to a fourth term in 2017.

In 2018, Baker said identifying the effects of the opioid epidemic was one of his main focuses as a councilor.

=== Fifth term (2020–21) ===
Baker was re-elected to a fifth term in 2019.

=== Sixth term (2022–23) ===
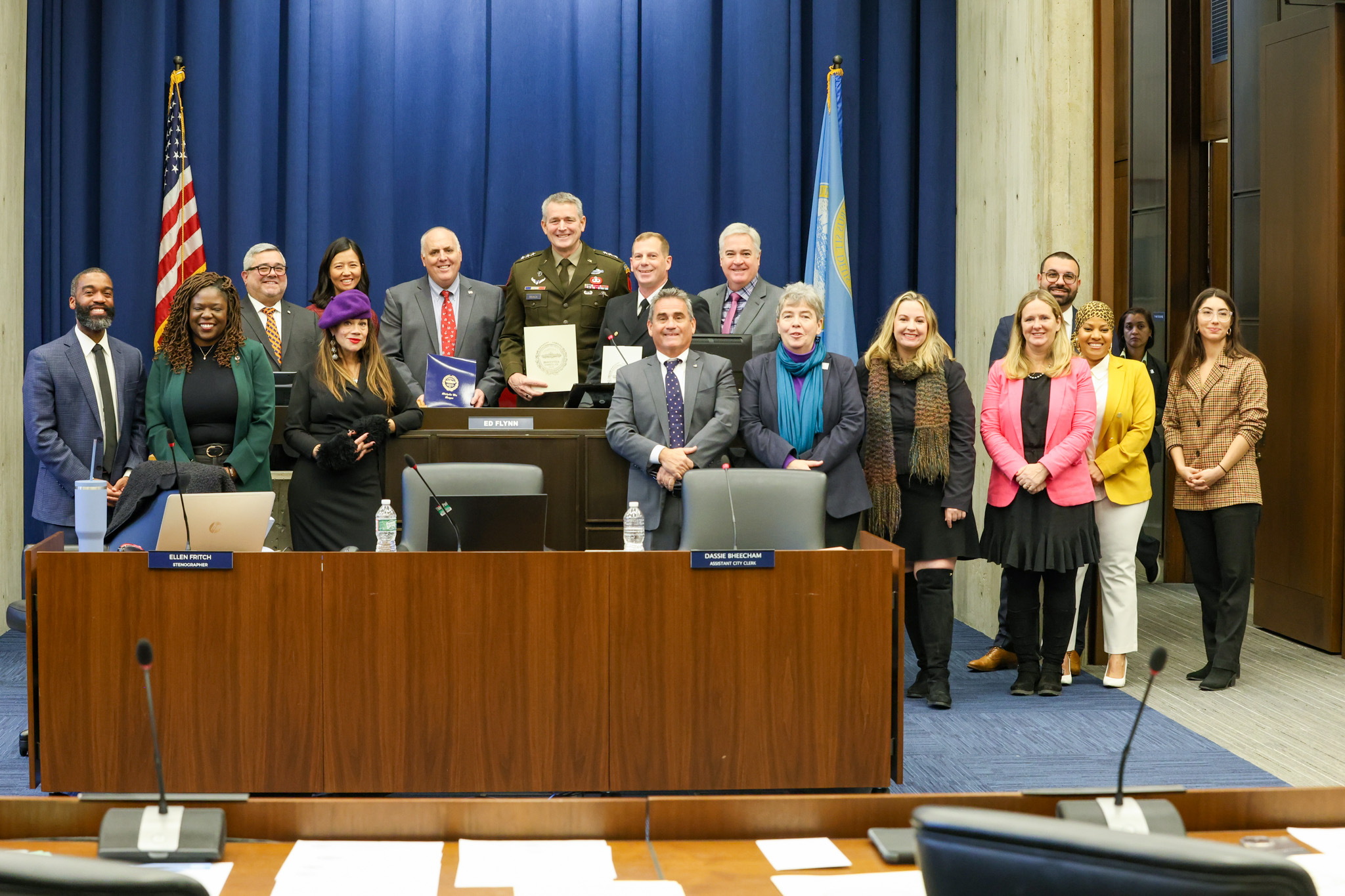
Baker (front row, fourth from left) join other councilors, Mayor Michelle Wu, Army Lt. Gen. Jonathan P. Braga, Navy Cpt. Henry Roeke, and others for a group photo inside of the council chamber on December 6, 2023

Baker was re-elected to a sixth term in 2021.

2023, Baker and Murphy were the only two City Council members to vote against advancing a home rule petition asking the state to allow the city to implement proposals put forward by Mayor Wu to reform the Boston Planning & Development Agency and to enact a form of rent control. In December 2023, Baker joined conservative backlash to Wu's hosting of an "Electeds of Color" holiday party, an affinity group event which excluded white members of the City Council. Baker characterized the event "divisive" and "inflammatory".

Baker was one of four Boston City Councilors that voted against the council's redistricting map that was approved after the 2020 United States Census. The map made alterations to the shape of Baker's district and a neighboring district. To account for the population growth of the South Boston Waterfront, several white majority conservative precincts in his district were moved into a neighboring district. Baker took particular issue with the map's separation of precincts around Dorchester's Adams Village business area into different city council districts. The map that Baker was against was ultimately prohibited by preliminary injunction from being used in the 2023 Boston City Council election after a ruling by Federal Judge Patti Saris.

At a City Council meeting early October 2023, Baker and Sharon Durkan opposed holding an immediate vote on a resolution proposed at the meeting by Tania Fernandes Anderson related to the Gaza war. Unlike other resolutions related to the conflict that were being discussed at the meeting, Fernandes Anderson's resolution was not focused on condemning the October 7 attacks, and instead centered on calling for a ceasefire. Fernandes Anderson's resolution characterized the attack as a "military operation" rather than an act of terrorism. The resolution was referred to the committee of the whole instead of being voted on.

In December 2023, Baker voted against a home rule petition that would seek state approval for Boston to extend voting participation in municipal elections to non-citizen residents with legal status.

In 2023, Baker announced that after six terms on city council that he would not be running for another term.

=== Unsuccessful 2025 campaign for an at-large seat ===
In 2025, Baker announced that he would be running to re-join the council, this time seeking an at-large seat instead of a district seat. Baker raised more funds for his campaign than other at-large candidates. He also was endorsed by former mayor Walsh. Heading into the November 2025 general election, Henry Santana was considered the most vulnerable incumbent councilor Baker might unseat if he prevailed. Since Santana is a progressive regarded to be among Mayor Wu's staunchest council allies, this meant that there was the possibility of a Baker win both altering the ideological lean of the council and decreasing the number of Wu allies on the council. Ultimately, all four incumbents (including Santana) won re-election, with Santana out-performing Baker in the general election by a sizable margin.

== Electoral history ==
2011 Boston City Council election (3rd district)
Candidates	Preliminary election		General election	
Candidates	Votes	%	Votes	%
Frank Baker	2,338	31.53	5,262	55.78
John O'Toole	1,916	25.84	4,120	43.68
Craig Galvin	1,769	23.86		
Doug Bennett	703	9.48		
Marydith Tuitt	334	4.50		
Stephanie Everett	266	3.59		
Martin Hogan	63	0.85		

2013 Boston City Council election (3rd district)
Candidates	General election	
Candidates	Votes	%
Frank Baker	9945	97.76
all others	228	2.24

2015 Boston City Council election (3rd district)
Candidate	Votes	%
Frank Baker (incumbent)	4,745	84.9
Donnie Palmer	811	14.5
write ins	34	0.61

2017 Boston City Council election (3rd district)
Candidate	Votes	%
Frank Baker (incumbent)	8,385	97.12
write ins	249	2.88

2019 Boston City Council election (3rd district)
Candidate	Votes	%
Frank Baker (incumbent)	4,822	95.4
write ins	235	4.6

2021 Boston City Council election (3rd district)
Candidates	General election	
Candidates	Votes	%
Frank Baker (incumbent)	8,518	62.9
Stephen McBride	4,972	36.7
Write-in	62	0.5
Total	13,552	100

2025 Boston City Council election (at-large)
Candidates	Preliminary election		General election	
Candidates	Votes	%	Votes	%
Ruthzee Louijeune (i)	45,500	18.7	54,885	19.2
Julia M. Mejia (i)	42,245	17.4	47,770	16.7
Erin J. Murphy (i)	38,981	16.0	46,709	16.4
Henry A. Santana (i)	30,670	12.6	44,206	15.5
Frank K. Baker	26,240	10.8	28,526	10.0
Alexandra E. Valdez	18,930	7.8	23,468	8.2
Marvin Mathelier	13,826	5.7	21,101	7.4
Will Onuoha	11,216	4.6	17,540	6.2
Yves Mary Jean	7,419	3.0		
Rachel Miselman	7,134	2.9		
Write-in	988	0.4		
Total	243,149	100	285,375	100
Turnout	93,168		96,405	
