= Erin Murphy (Massachusetts politician) =

American politician and educator

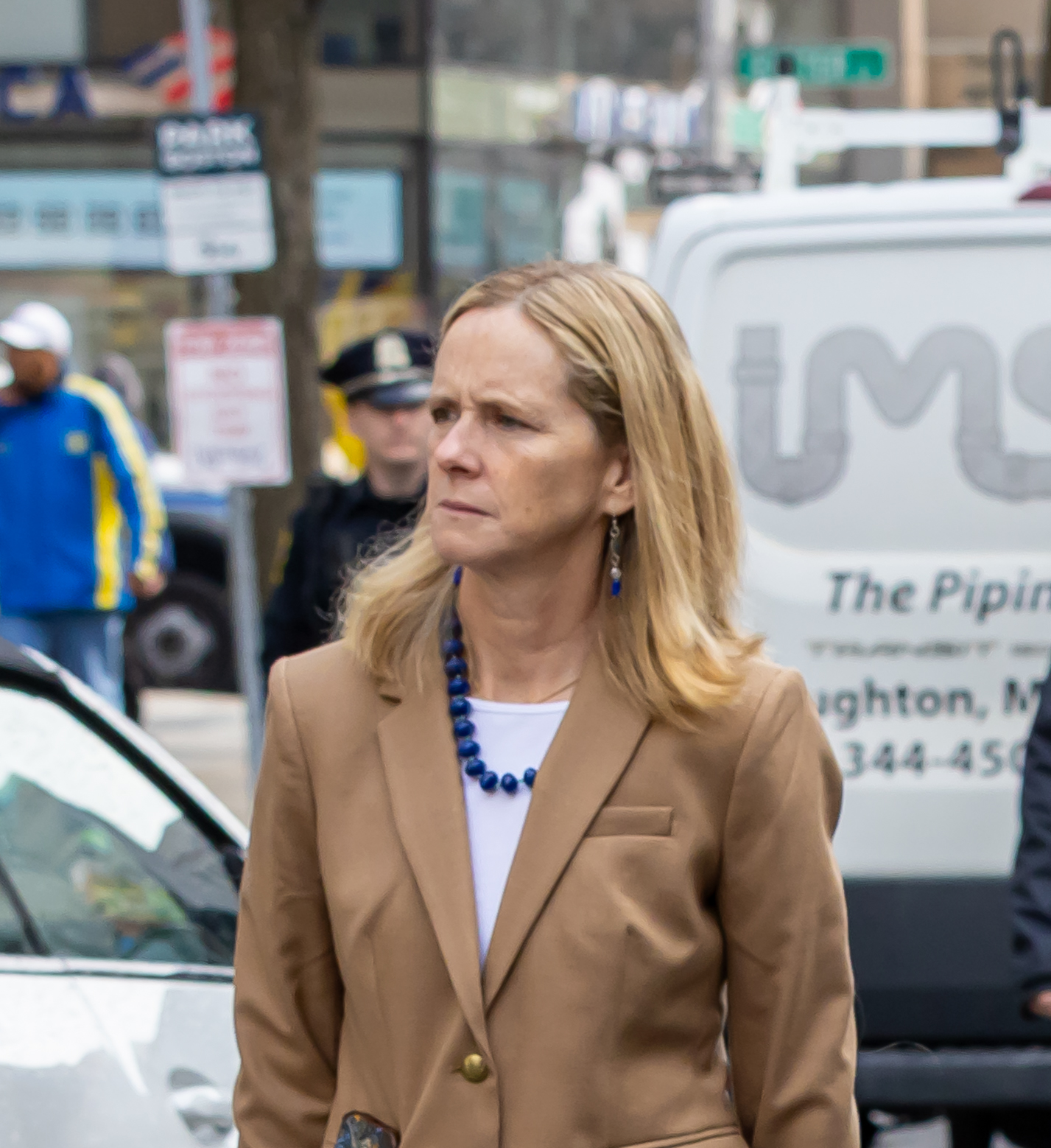
- Murphy in 2025

Member of the Boston City Council at-large
- Incumbent
- Assumed office December 1, 2021
- Preceded by: Michelle Wu

Personal details
- Born: 1969 or 1970 (age 56–57)
- Party: Democratic
- Children: 4
- Relatives: Darragh Murphy (sister)
- Website: Government webpage; Campaign website

Erin Jean Murphy is an American politician and educator who has served as an at-large member of the Boston City Council since December 2021. Murphy is a Democrat, and is considered one of the more politically moderate and conservative members of the council. In 2024, she unsuccessfully sought the Democratic nomination in the election for clerk of the Supreme Judicial Court of Suffolk County.

== Early life, family, and early career ==
Murphy was born and raised in the Dorchester neighborhood of Boston. In her adulthood, she has continued to live in the same neighborhood, where she raised her four children. Murphy is a single mother.

For twenty years, Murphy worked as a Boston Public Schools teacher in Dorchester. Much of her work was with kindergarten and special needs students. For several years before joining the Boston City Council, she worked as a special education coordinator.

Murphy has completed philanthropic and advocacy work on the matter of substance abuse. She ran the Boston Marathon in three consecutive years to raise more than $50,000 for the Gavin Foundation. In 2016, Boston Mayor Marty Walsh recognized Murphy with the "EXTRAordinary" award. In 2017, the Massachusetts Commission on the Status of Women gave her their "Unsung Heroine Award" for her work.

Murphy's grandfather, Richard Murphy, founded the Dorchester United Neighborhood Association and has a public school in Boston named for him. Her sister, Darragh Murphy, is notable for founding People United Means Action (PUMA) to oppose the nomination of Barack Obama as the Democratic Party nominee in the 2008 United States presidential election.

== City council ==
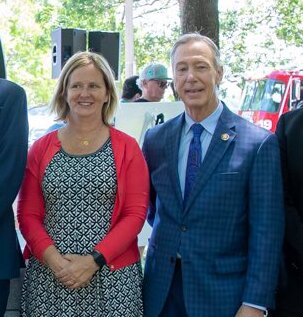
Murphy with Congressman Stephen Lynch in 2022

Elected in 2021, Murphy serves as a member of the Boston City Council. While the council's elections are nonpartisan, Murphy identifies herself as being a member of the Democratic Party. She has been described as one of the more conservative or politically moderate members of the council. She has established herself as one of the council's most frequent critics of Mayor Michelle Wu.

=== Unsuccessful 2019 campaign, 2021 election and partial term ===
In 2019, Murphy ran in the election for the four at-large seats on the Boston City Council. She finished the election in sixth-place in the general election, thereby losing. Murphy ran again in 2021 and won election (placing fourth). Alongside Ruthzee Louijeune, Murphy was one of two new council members elected to an at-large seat. Incumbents Michael F. Flaherty and Julia Mejia won re-election in the same race, while Michelle Wu and Annissa Essaibi George had each forgone seeking re-election to the city council in order to seek election that year to the city's mayoralty.

Wu won the coinciding mayoral election. Under the Boston City Charter, a mayoral vacancy sees a new mayor sworn in as soon as is possible after the next mayoral election. Boston's previous permanent mayor, Marty Walsh, had resigned earlier that year to become U.S. secretary of labor, meaning Wu's assumption of office took place in November 2021, earlier than is typical for a mayor and earlier than the expiration of her at-large city council term. The Boston City Charter also specifies that a vacant at-large Boston City Council will be filled by the highest-performing runner-up who accepts the position. The first runner-up (fifth-place finisher) of the 2019 at-large city council election had been Alejandra St. Guillen, who considered serving the remainder of Wu's term before declining the opportunity. Since Murphy had been the next runner-up (the sixth-place finisher), she was given the opportunity to finish Wu's unexpired city council term. She accepted, and was sworn in December 1 to serve the final month of Wu's unexpired at-large City Council term.

=== First full term (2022–2023) ===
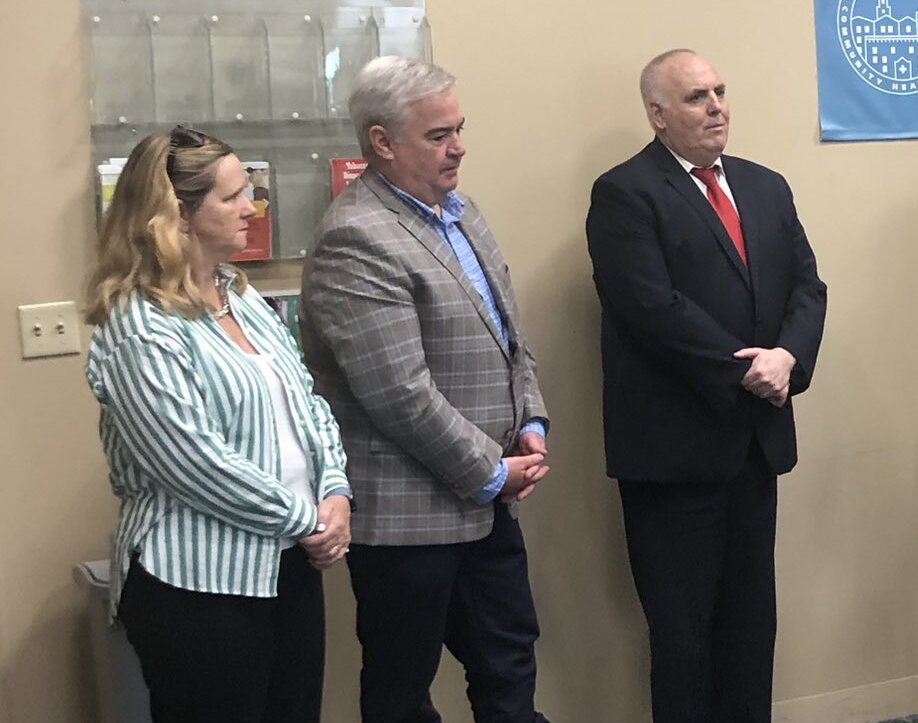
Murphy and Councilors Michael F. Flaherty, and Ed Flynn at the South Boston Health Center in July 2023

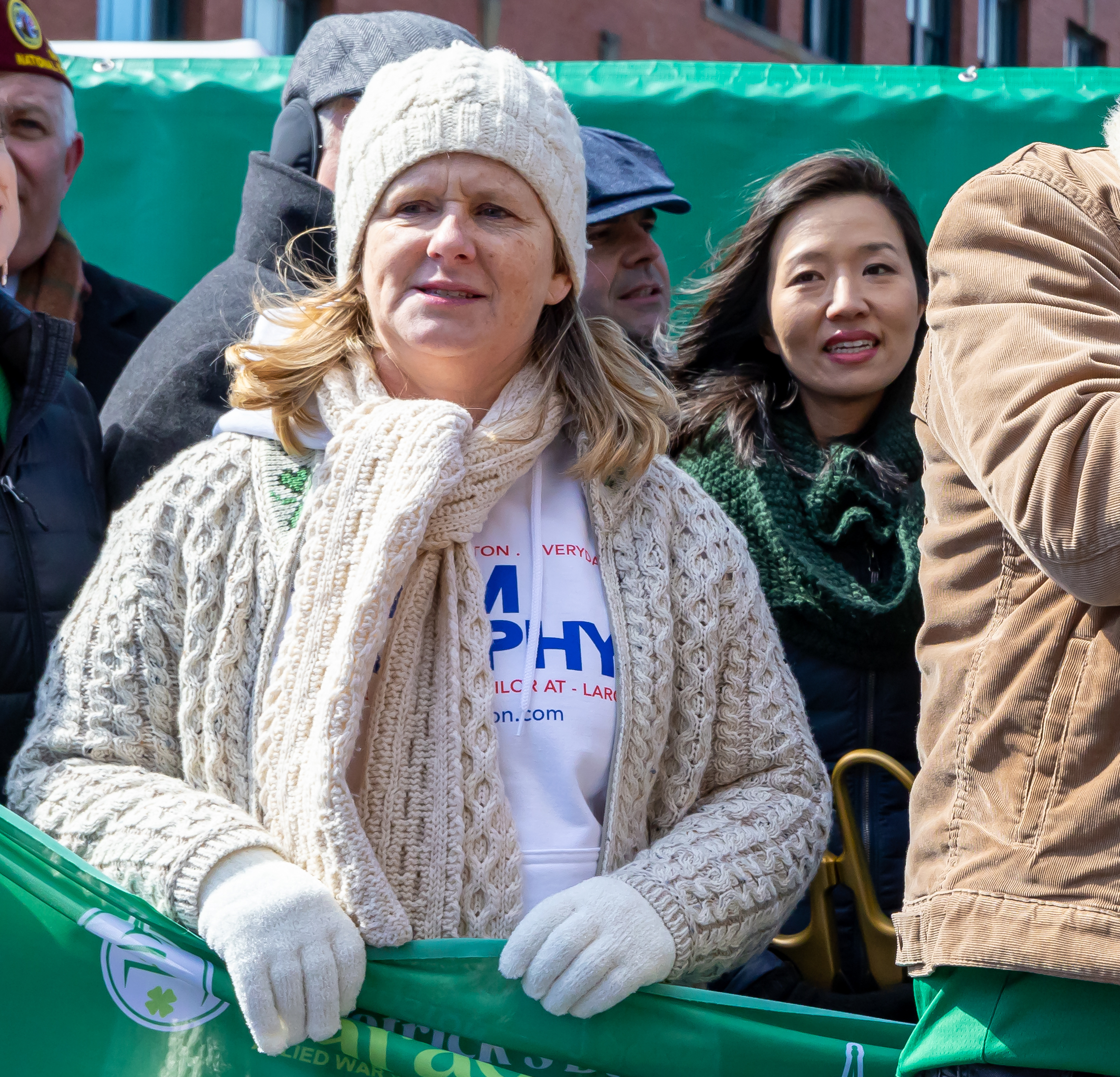
Murphy stands near Mayor Michelle Wu and other officials at the 2023 South Boston St. Patrick's Day Parade

Murphy began her first full city council term on January 3, 2022. During this term, Murphy joined councilors Frank Baker, Michael F. Flaherty, and Ed Flynn in an informal grouping that often functioned as a centrist council bloc.

In September 2023, the centrist bloc signed onto a letter urging that the Boston Public Health Commission hold a vote at their next meeting declaring the situation at Mass & Cass to be a public health emergency. In February 2023, the bloc was joined by Brian Worrell in voting against advancing a home rule petition to make the Boston School Committee a publicly elected school board. Despite their opposition, the ordinance passed 7–5; but it was vetoed by Mayor Wu, who had argued that it was an inopportune moment to make such a transition due to the need to stabilize the state of the city's schools. The informal bloc of Murphy, Baker, Flaherty, and Flynn were alsothe sole votes against the council's redistricting map that was initially approved by the City Council after the 2020 United States Census and which and Mayor Wu passed into law in November 2022. The redistricting process was contentious. The map would have shifted three voting precincts that have historically been predominantly Irish American into a ward that is Black-majority. While noting the Murphy acted civilly in expressing her objections, Yawu Miller of the Bay State Banner characterized the objections as being grounded in "white grievance politics". During this dispute, it was noted by Michael Jonas of Commonwealth Magazine that the bloc was not only politically moderate, but also entirely White. After a lawsuit, the map was prohibited by preliminary injunction from being used in the 2023 Boston City Council election after a ruling by Federal Judge Patti B. Saris, and an interim map was approved by the council and signed into law by Mayor Wu.

In early 2023, Murphy and Councilor Baker were the sole votes against the rent control home rule petition championed by Mayor Wu. In late-2023, Murphy voted against a home rule petition that would seek state approval for Boston to extend voting participation in municipal (local) elections to non-citizen residents with legal status.

=== Second term (2024–2025) ===
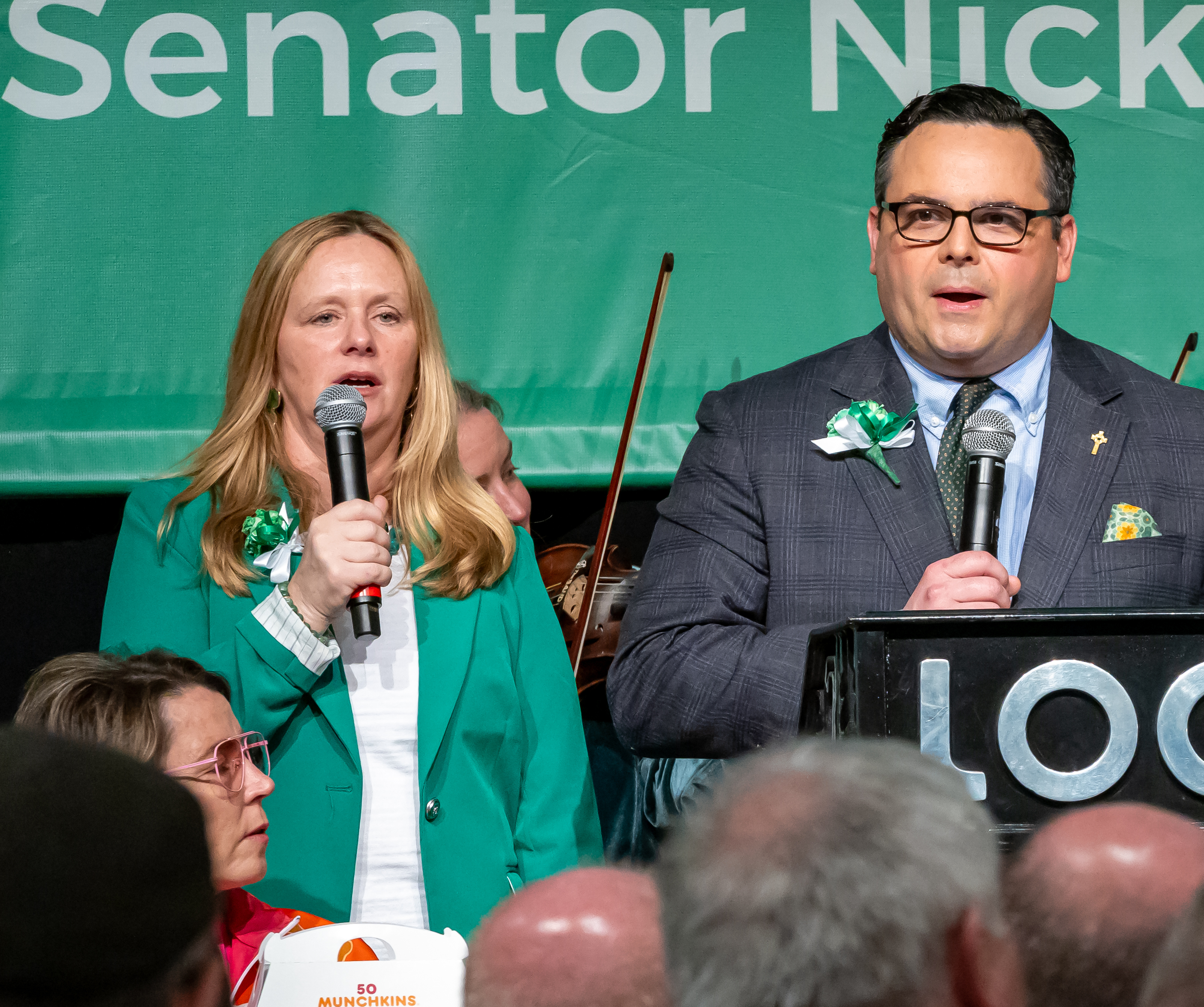
Murphy stands near Governor Maura Healey (bottom left) and State Senator Nick Collins (right) during the 2024 South Boston St. Patrick's Day Breakfast

Murphy was reelected in 2023, finishing second in the at-large election. Murphy joined Councilor Flynn in making a last-minute push to encourage Councilor Mejia to run against Ruthzee Louijeune for the council presidency. At the January 2024 inaugural session of the new council term, Flynn nominated Mejia, but Mejia declined his nomination and Louijeune was unanimously elected council president.

Murphy is chair of the council's Strong Women, Families and Communities Committee.

Baker and Flaherty had retired from the council at the end of the previous term, leaving Murphy and Flynn the sole returning members of their voting bloc. Newly-elected councilor John FitzGerald joined Murphy and Flynn in forming the council's de facto conservative-leaning bloc. In early 2024, Murphy and Flynn proposed a resolution urging for the city to expand eligibility for Mayor Wu's pilot program providing free admission to museums for Boston Public Schools students and their families, proposing opening up to students who do not attend the city's public schools. Councilor Sharon Durkan had the resolution sent to committee for further consideration, rather than put to an immediate vote, noting that the existing program was still in a pilot phase and arguing that further discussion should be had before voting on the resolution. In October 2024, Murphy and Flynn proposed their own alternative to Mayor Wu's initial proposal to adjust commercial property taxes. After Mayor Wu introduced a new proposal later that month (reached after a compromise between Wu and business organizations that had opposed Wu's earlier proposal), Murphy filed a request to receive information related to new city positions that had been created during Wu's mayoralty. Information requested the job description, salary (and funding source of the salary), department, date of creation, qualifications for hires, status of hiring for each position, as well as a rationale for why each position was created. She asserted that she believed that this was important information for her to have.

In November 2024, Murphy and Flynn proposed a resolution that would have recommended that the city's election department be placed under state receivership. Fellow councilor Tania Fernandes Anderson joined them in sponsoring the resolution (however, she ultimately abstained from the vote). The resolution was defeated, only receiving the votes of Flynn and Murphy in a vote of 2–7 (with four abstentions) The resolution had been proposed in reaction to ballot supply shortages experienced in the city on election day earlier that month. Other councilors expressed concern that such a recommendation would be premature, and argued that before making any such recommendation the council should first engage in due diligence (including an already-scheduled hearing featuring testimony by city election officials). In May 2025, Murphy voted against advancing a home rule petition that would allow for Boston's city elections to utilize instant runoff voting (IRV) ranked choice voting in its elections. She argued that IRV was confusing to voters who are not native English speakers, and defended Boston's existing election system, describing it as, "simple, clear, [and] makes sure every vote counts." Despite her opposition, the council advanced the petition by a vote of 8–4.

==== 2024 campaign for clerk of the Suffolk Supreme Judicial Court ====
Murphy unsuccessfully sought the nomination in the Democratic Party primary election of the 2024 election for court clerk of the Supreme Judicial Court of Suffolk County

Murphy announced her candidacy in March 2024. Incumbent clerk Maura Doyle (who had held the office since 1996) had already opted not to seek reelection. Murphy's opponent in the primary was public defense attorney Allison Cartwright. Since no candidates were seeking the Republican nomination, the winner of the September Democratic primary was anticipated to win the November general election without opposition.

The clerk's office manages the law admissions of lawyers, disciplinary matters pertaining to lawyers, and single-justice cases of the high-court (appeals for emergency relief). The office is regarded as relatively obscure, with few locals being able to describe it. While low-profile, the office is considered high-paying and tends to offer job security as incumbents serve longer terms than city councilors and have regularly been reelected.

Murphy was described as campaigning on a mantle of being an "old-school moderate focused on constituent services". The alignment of endorsements for each candidate led the primary to be described as a proxy battle between the city's progressive politicians and the city's more conservative "old guard". Many prominent progressive politicians endorsed Cartwright, while many practitioners of more conservative "old-school" Boston politics endorsed Murphy. Among those endorsing Murphy's candidacy were Boston city councilor Ed Flynn and U.S. Congressman Stephen Lynch, state senator Nick Collins, state representative Dan Hunt, city councilman John FitzGerald, and former mayor Raymond Flynn. Numerous of Murphy's prominent endorsers hailed from the neighborhoods of South Boston (including Collins and City Councillor Flynn) and Dorchester (including Hunt and FitzGerald). Among those supporting Cartwright against Murphy were mayor Wu, governor Maura Healey state attorney general Andrea Campbell, and congresswoman Ayanna Pressley. It was also described as a proxy battle between Mayor Wu's allies and her critics: with Wu and several allies endorsing Cartwright, and many Wu critics endorsing Murphy. These dynamics led the race to garner far more interest than elections for the office had previously attracted. Murphy and Cartwright's campaigns each raised hundreds of thousands of dollars.

Murphy was defeated by Cartwright, winning 40% of the vote to Cartwright's 60%. Cartwright was the leading performer in 216 of 271 electoral precincts.

=== Third term (2026–present) ===
After losing her campaign for county office, Murphy declared her plans to run for re-election to the city council in 2025. She won re-election.

== Electoral history ==
2019 Boston at-large City Council election
Candidate	Primary election		General election	
Candidate	Votes	%	Votes	%
Michelle Wu (incumbent)	26,622	19.4	41,664	20.7
Annissa Essaibi George (incumbent)	18,993	13.8	34,109	17.0
Michael F. Flaherty (incumbent)	18,766	13.7	33,284	16.6
Julia Mejia	10,799	7.9	22,492	11.2
Alejandra St. Guillen	11,910	8.7	22,491	11.2
Erin Murphy	9,385	6.8	16,867	8.4
Althea Garrison (incumbent)	9,720	7.1	16,189	8.1
David Halbert	6,354	4.8	13,214	6.6
Martin Keogh	6,246	4.5		
Jeffrey Ross	5,078	3.7		
Priscilla Flint-Banks	4,094	3.0		
Domingos DaRosa	2,840	2.1		
Michel Denis	2,108	1.5		
William King	1,809	1.3		
Herb Lozano	1,510	1.10		
all others	766	0.6	704	0.4
Total	137,380	100	201,014	100

2021 Boston City Council at-large election
Candidate	Primary election		General election	
Candidate	Votes	%	Votes	%
Michael F. Flaherty (incumbent)	41,299	15.0	62,606	17.4
Julia Mejia (incumbent)	38,765	14.1	62,058	17.3
Ruthzee Louijeune	33,425	12.2	54,898	15.3
Erin Murphy	22,835	8.3	43,076	12.0
David Halbert	16,921	6.2	42,765	11.9
Carla Monteiro	18,844	6.9	39,876	11.1
Bridget Nee-Walsh	15,118	5.5	27,591	7.7
Althea Garrison	16,810	6.1	25,078	7.0
Kelly Bates	12,735	4.6		
Alexander Gray	11,263	4.1		
Jon Spillane	11,155	4.1		
Said Abdikarim	7,725	2.8		
Domingos DaRosa	7,139	2.6		
Donnie Palmer Jr.	6,823	2.5		
Roy Owens Sr.	5,223	1.9		
James Colimon	4,671	1.7		
Nick Vance	3,943	1.4		
Write-ins	845	0.3	1,350	0.4
Total	274,694	100	359,294	100

2023 Boston at-large City Council election
Candidate	Votes	%
Ruthzee Louijeune (incumbent)	44,641	20.29
Erin Murphy (incumbent)	43,548	19.80
Julia Mejia (incumbent)	39,187	18.10
Henry Santana	34,151	15.53
Bridget Nee-Walsh	26,775	12.17
Shawn Nelson	10,512	4.78
Clifton A. Braithwaite	10,299	4.68
Catherine Vitale	8,560	3.89
Juwan Skeens write-in	113	0.05
all others	1,549	0.70
Total votes	219,965	100

2024 Democratic primary for Clerk of the Suffolk Supreme Judicial Court
Party	Candidate	Votes	%
Democratic	Allison Cartwright	30,358	59.56
Democratic	Erin Murphy	20,500	40.22
Write-in	others	116	0.23
Total votes		50,974	100

2025 Boston at-large City Council election
Candidates	Preliminary election		General election	
Candidates	Votes	%	Votes	%
Ruthzee Louijeune (i)	45,500	18.7	54,885	19.2
Julia M. Mejia (i)	42,245	17.4	47,770	16.7
Erin J. Murphy (i)	38,981	16.0	46,709	16.4
Henry A. Santana (i)	30,670	12.6	44,206	15.5
Frank K. Baker	26,240	10.8	28,526	10.0
Alexandra E. Valdez	18,930	7.8	23,468	8.2
Marvin Mathelier	13,826	5.7	21,101	7.4
Will Onuoha	11,216	4.6	17,540	6.2
Yves Mary Jean	7,419	3.0		
Rachel Miselman	7,134	2.9		
Write-in	988	0.4		
Total	243,149	100	285,375	100
Turnout	93,168		96,405	
