= Julia Mejia =

American politician

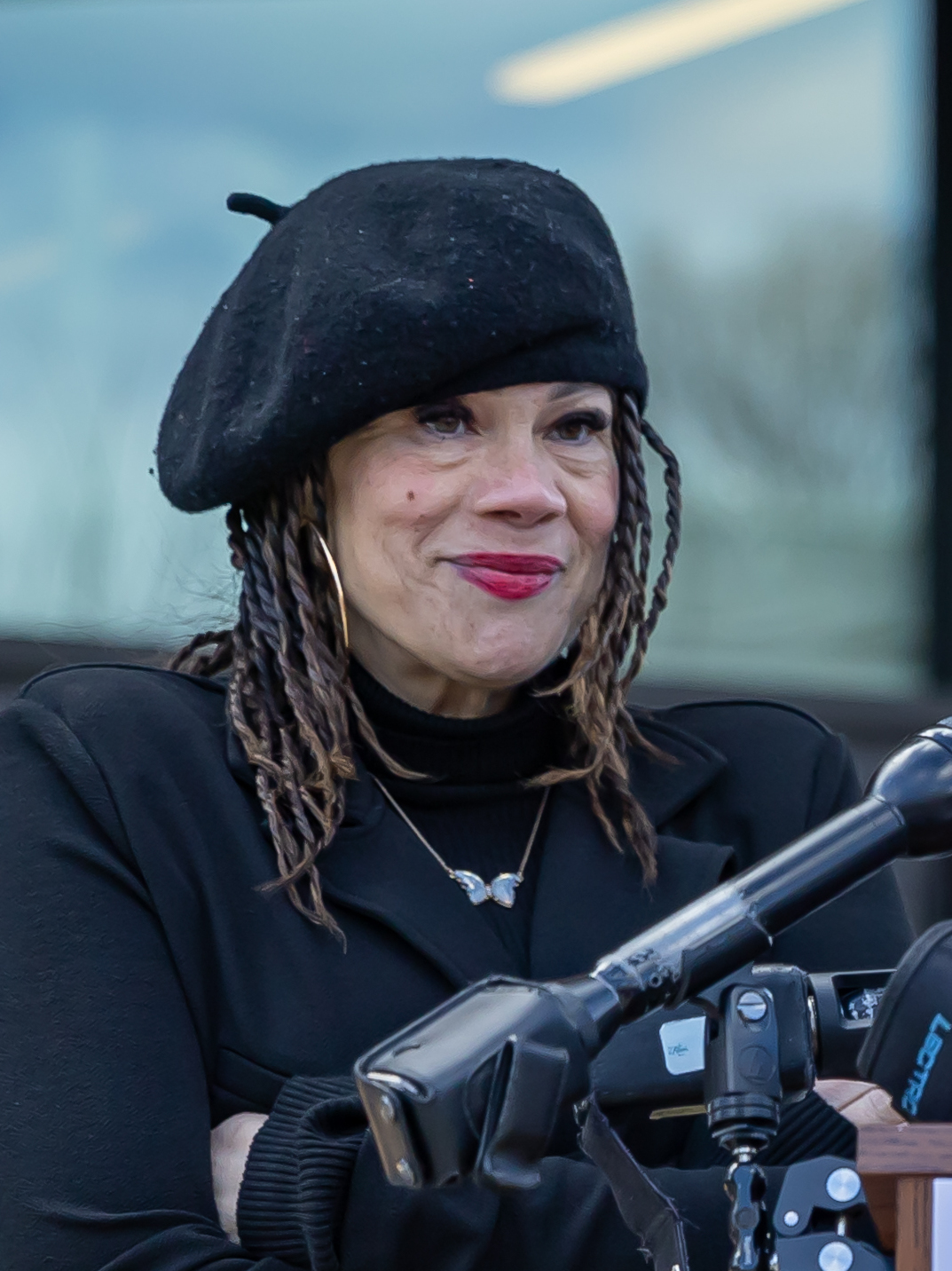
- Mejia in 2024

Member of the Boston City Council at-large
- Incumbent
- Assumed office January 6, 2020
- Preceded by: Althea Garrison

Personal details
- Born: Dominican Republic
- Party: Democratic
- Education: Mount Ida College
- Website: juliaforboston.com

Julia M. Mejia is a Dominican-American politician and former news reporter currently serving as At-Large City Councilor in Boston, Massachusetts. Elected in 2019, Mejia is the first Latina elected to the council.

== Early life and career ==
Born in the Dominican Republic and raised by a single mother, Mejia came to the United States when she was five years old. She graduated from Dorchester High School and earned a Bachelor of Arts from Mount Ida College.

Mejia worked as a reporter for MTV News covering the 2000 U.S. presidential election and an organizer with Massachusetts Charter Public School Association. She is the founder of Collaborative Parent Leadership Action Network (CPLAN).

== Boston City Council ==
Mejia has served on the Boston City Council since early 2020. She is regarded to be a progressive member of the Democratic Party.

=== First term (2020–2021) ===
Mejia ran for one of four at-large Boston City Council seats in November 2019 in a field of eight candidates. After a recount, she won the fourth seat by one vote. Mejia took office on January 6, 2020, becoming the first immigrant to serve on the council.

In June 2020, Mejia (along with Ricardo Arroyo, Andrea Campbell, Kim Janey, and Michelle Wu) was one of five members of the Boston City Council to vote against Mayor Marty Walsh's 2021 operating budget for the city. Mejia wrote, "I am no longer interested in having drip-drop incremental changes that expect us to continue to hope and pray and wait some more about finally having the type of budget that really reflects the needs our people find themselves in today."

In 2020, the Boston Magazine named Mejia the year's "best city politician", writing that she had, "fought back against racist harassment after taking office in early 2020," and, "also worked to improve bilingual communications in Boston and even made a series of TikTok videos with her daughter to liven up the mood at City Hall during the early days of the [Covid-19] pandemic."

=== Second term (2022–2023) ===
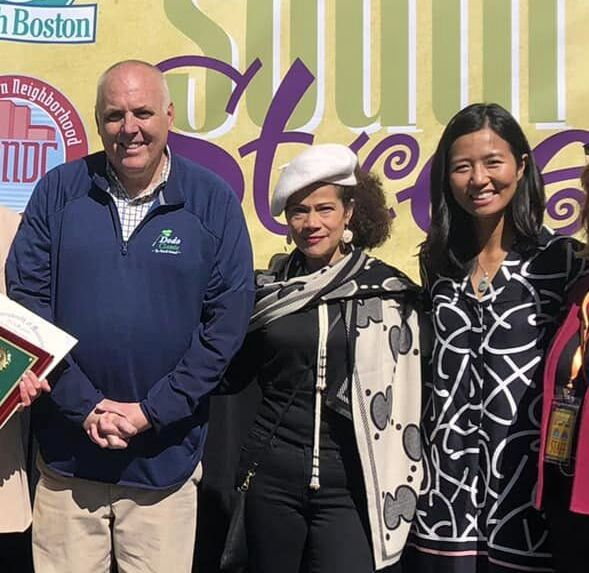
Mejia (center) with City Council President Ed Flynn (left) and Mayor Michelle Wu (right) in 2022

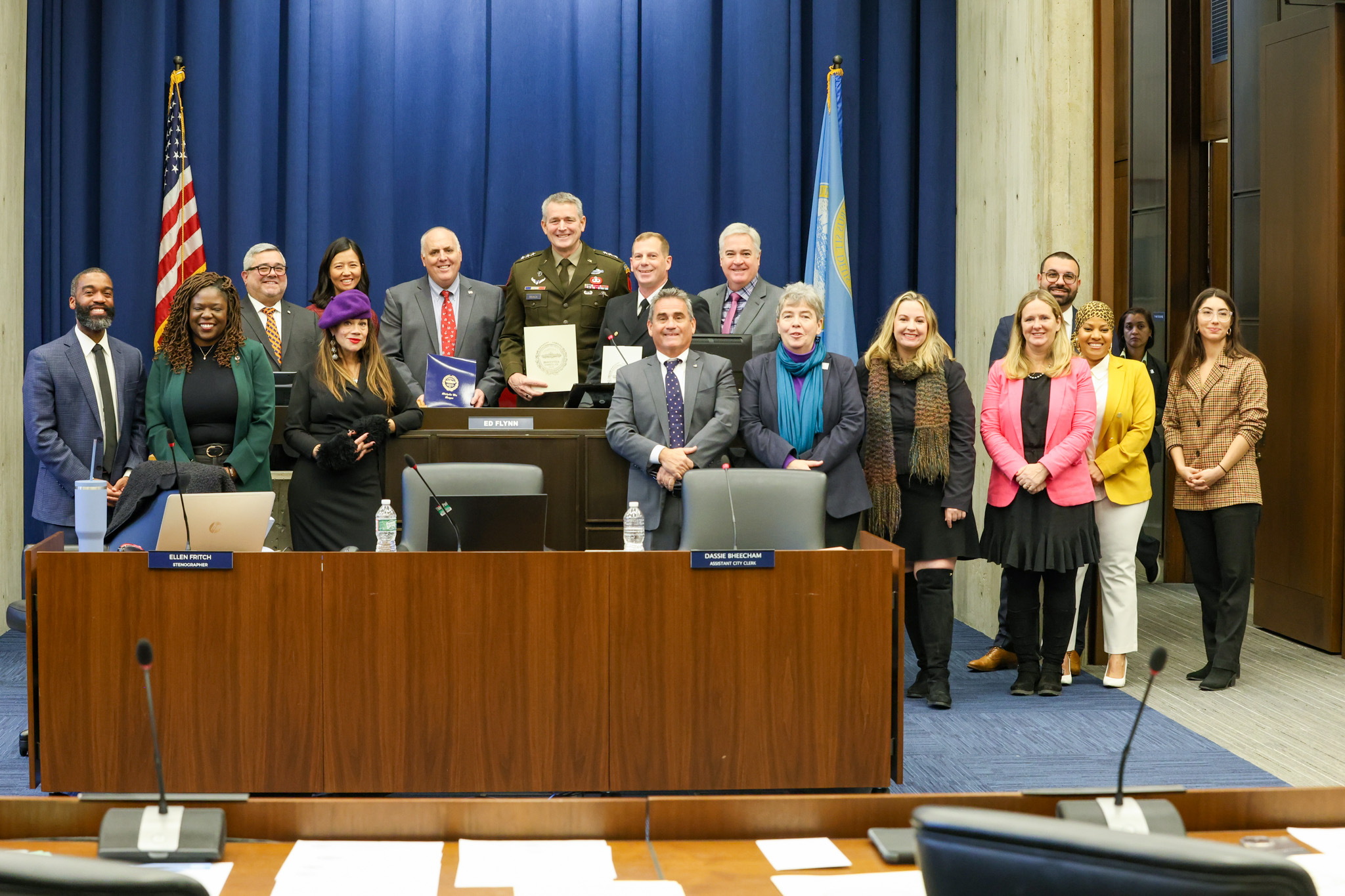
Mejia (front row, third from left) join other councilors, Mayor Michelle Wu, Army Lt. Gen. Jonathan P. Braga, Navy Cpt. Henry Roeke, and others for a group photo inside of the council chamber on December 6, 2023

In 2023, a city council attorney filed an internal complaint against Mejia and fellow councilors Ricardo Arroyo and Kendra Lara accusing all three of bullying and lambasting her during an April meeting.

At a City Council meeting in October 2023, Mejia opposed holding vote on a resolution proposed by Michael Flaherty on the October 7 attacks on Israel. Then Council President Ed Flynn had taken the docket out of order to discuss it immediately following the approval of the previous meeting's minutes. In response, Mejia said, "When [a resolution] calls for things such as this, I believe there's an opportunity for us to consider pulling this into a committee so that we can unpack it further, very similar to the treatment that we provided to the conversation around Cuba," referencing suggestions made by other Councilors at the time that the council was not "focusing on city business" in holding a vote on legislation regarding another country. Councilor Coletta separately recommended that the resolution be considered in committee. It was then referred to committee of the whole. During regular business, Mejia expressed support for a resolution filed by Tania Fernandes Anderson calling for a ceasefire to the War in Gaza, referencing the experience of living in New York City following 9/11.

Mejia, Ricardo Arroyo and Brian Worrell introduced an ordinance to create an Office of Cultural Affairs in the city. While the city council passed the ordinance in October 2023, and was subsequently signed and enacted by Mayor Michelle Wu. The office is situated the city's Equity & Inclusion Cabinet.

=== Third term (2024–present) ===
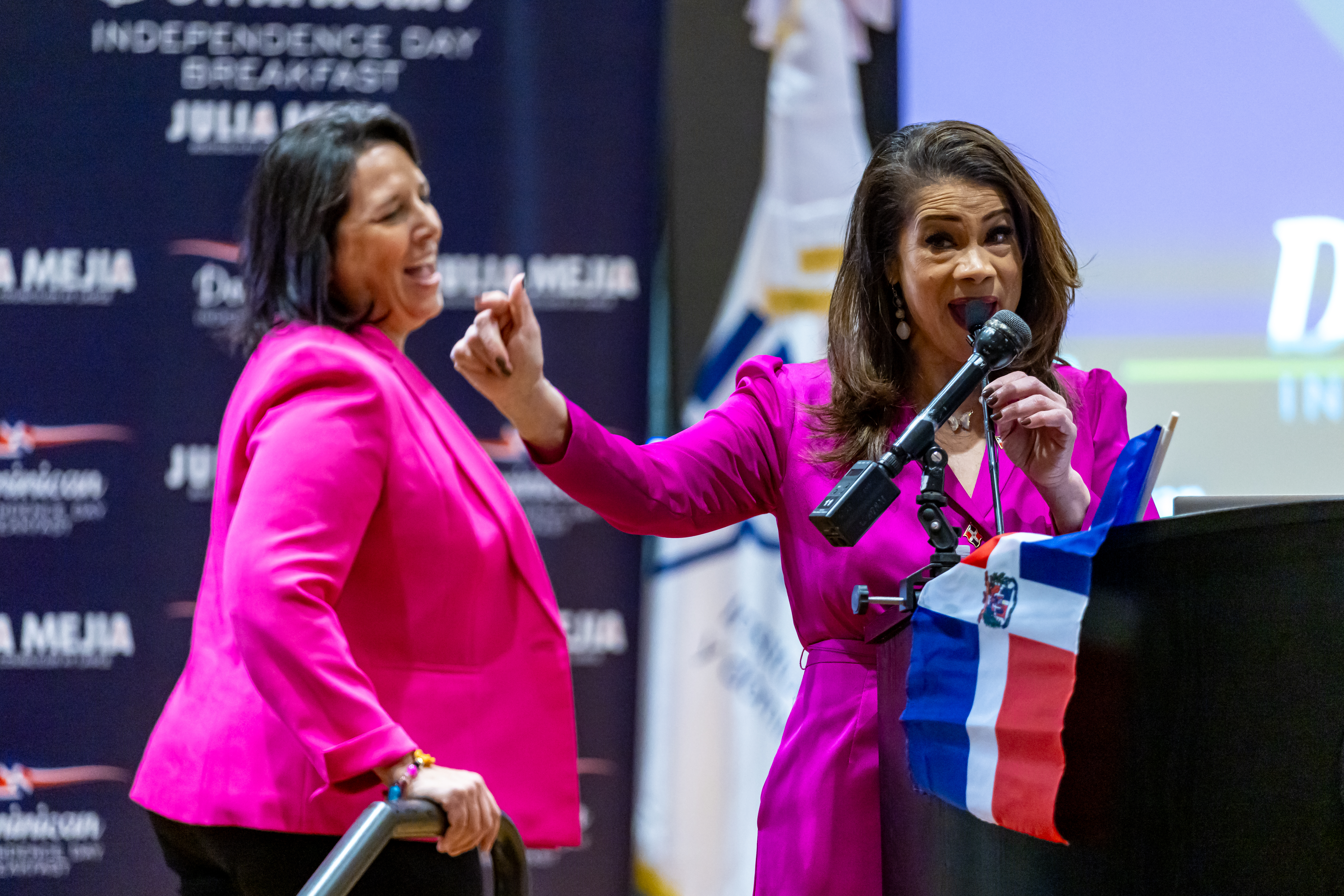
Mejia (right) with Lieutenant Governor Kim Driscoll at a 2024 Dominican Independence Day breakfast

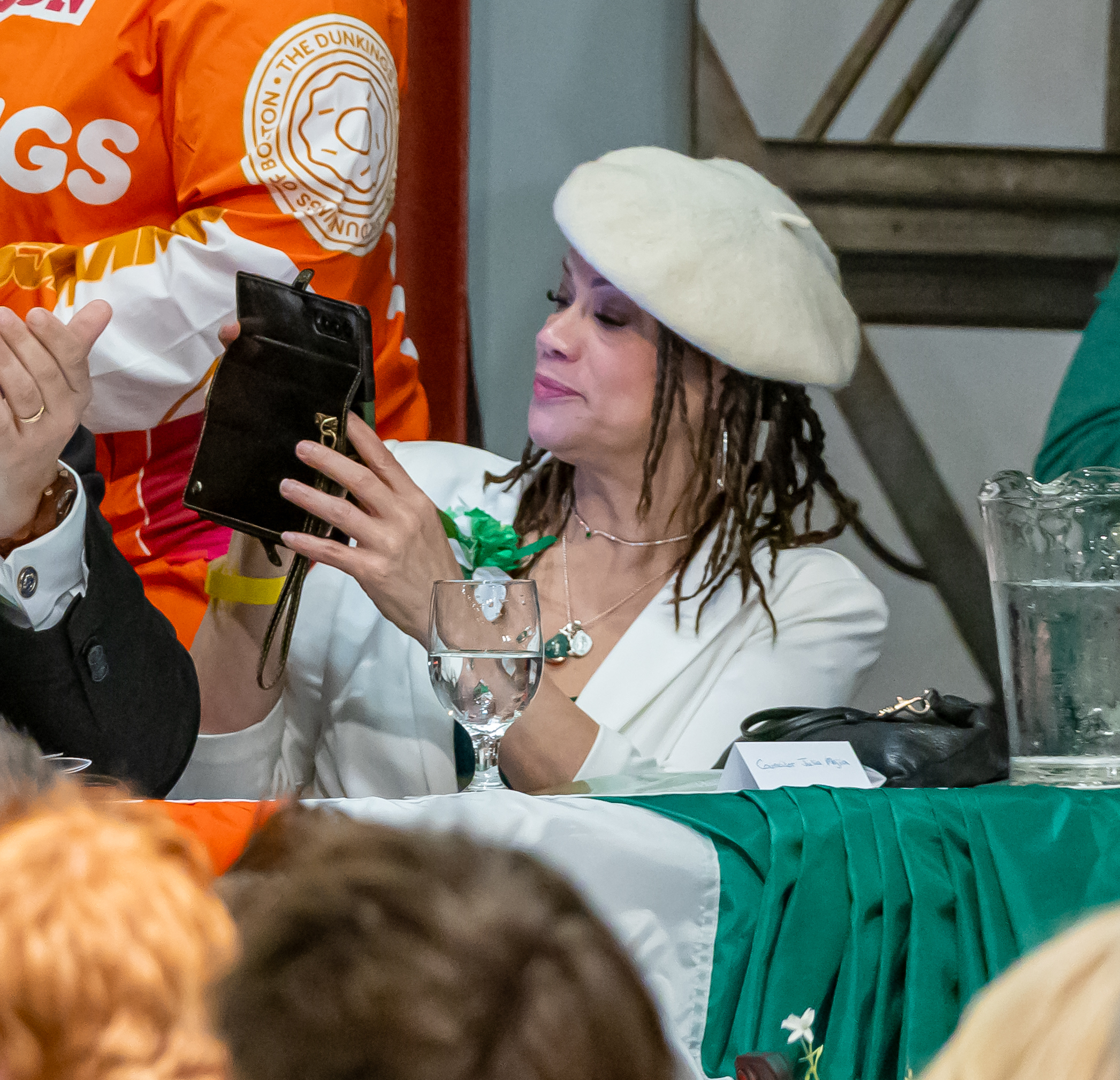
Mejia attending the 2024 South Boston St. Patrick's Day Breakfast

At the January 2024 start of the new city council term, the previous council president Ed Flynn nominated Mejia for the council presidency. However, she declined to seek the presidency and Ruthzee Louijeune was unanimously elected to the position.

In early 2025, Mejia co-sponsored a home rule petition that was introduced by Council President Louijeune seeking approval for Boston to adopt an instant runoff voting (IRV) system of ranked choice voting. In mid-May, the council voted 8–4 to approve the petition, advancing it to the mayor's desk. Mayor Wu signed it. The measure still needs state government passage in order to be enacted.

== Personal life ==
Mejia lives with her daughter, Annalise, in the Dorchester neighborhood of Boston.

== Controversies ==
=== Live-Stream Incident ===
In February 2021, a man named Brandon Williams was shot and killed while sitting in his car outside his home on Evans Street in Dorchester, adjacent to Julia Mejia’s residence. The murder attracted media attention in part because Mejia posted a Facebook Live video from the scene shortly afterward. The video showed the crime scene, including the victim's body, at close range, and Mejia entered the cordoned area while filming. The footage was later deleted.

Mejia subsequently issued a public apology, stating she had acted “first as a mother, as a neighbor” and had not thought of her role as a city councilor. She expressed regret for exposing the public to the video and for any harm it caused, and said she would not repeat that action. In her statements, she shifted focus to broader issues of gun violence in Boston, asserting the conversation should always be about the victim and systemic neighborhood safety rather than her own conduct.

The Williams family and community members voiced disappointment in Mejia’s judgment and sensitivity, particularly regarding her decision to film and to what degree she cooperated with law enforcement on site. A petition circulated calling for her resignation.

In January 2023, Mejia filed a defamation and libel lawsuit against Aidan Kearney, operator of the Turtleboy website, citing, among other claims, false statements he made about her role in the 2021 live-streaming incident.

=== Workplace Misconduct Allegation ===
In August 2023, Boston City Council attorney Christine O’Donnell filed an internal complaint alleging that councilors Ricardo Arroyo, Kendra Lara, and Julia Mejia created a toxic work environment and engaged in bullying behavior during an April council meeting. O’Donnell, who serves as the council’s staff counsel and compliance director, stated that the three councilors berated and undermined her while she attempted to advise members on parliamentary procedure during a dispute over redistricting.

According to O’Donnell’s written complaint, Mejia dismissed her authority by suggesting the council instead consult another staff member referred to as the “real attorney.” O’Donnell described the remark as an attack on her integrity and an example of a culture of disrespect and intimidation within the council chamber. She wrote that the behavior of Mejia and others contributed to an environment where staff members feared retaliation for speaking up.

== Electoral history ==
2019 Boston at-large City Council election
Candidate	Primary election		General election	
Candidate	Votes	%	Votes	%
Michelle Wu (incumbent)	26,622	19.4	41,664	20.7
Annissa Essaibi George (incumbent)	18,993	13.8	34,109	17.0
Michael F. Flaherty (incumbent)	18,766	13.7	33,284	16.6
Julia Mejia	10,799	7.9	22,492	11.2
Alejandra St. Guillen	11,910	8.7	22,491	11.2
Erin Murphy	9,385	6.8	16,867	8.4
Althea Garrison (incumbent)	9,720	7.1	16,189	8.1
David Halbert	6,354	4.8	13,214	6.6
Martin Keogh	6,246	4.5		
Jeffrey Ross	5,078	3.7		
Priscilla Flint-Banks	4,094	3.0		
Domingos DaRosa	2,840	2.1		
Michel Denis	2,108	1.5		
William King	1,809	1.3		
Herb Lozano	1,510	1.10		
all others	766	0.6	704	0.4
Total	137,380	100	201,014	100

2021 Boston City Council at-large election
Candidate	Primary election		General election	
Candidate	Votes	%	Votes	%
Michael F. Flaherty (incumbent)	41,299	15.0	62,606	17.4
Julia Mejia (incumbent)	38,765	14.1	62,058	17.3
Ruthzee Louijeune	33,425	12.2	54,898	15.3
Erin Murphy	22,835	8.3	43,076	12.0
David Halbert	16,921	6.2	42,765	11.9
Carla Monteiro	18,844	6.9	39,876	11.1
Bridget Nee-Walsh	15,118	5.5	27,591	7.7
Althea Garrison	16,810	6.1	25,078	7.0
Kelly Bates	12,735	4.6		
Alexander Gray	11,263	4.1		
Jon Spillane	11,155	4.1		
Said Abdikarim	7,725	2.8		
Domingos DaRosa	7,139	2.6		
Donnie Palmer Jr.	6,823	2.5		
Roy Owens Sr.	5,223	1.9		
James Colimon	4,671	1.7		
Nick Vance	3,943	1.4		
Write-ins	845	0.3	1,350	0.4
Total	274,694	100	359,294	100

2023 Boston at-large City Council election
Candidate	Votes	%
Ruthzee Louijeune (incumbent)	44,641	20.29
Erin Murphy (incumbent)	43,548	19.80
Julia Mejia (incumbent)	39,187	18.10
Henry Santana	34,151	15.53
Bridget Nee-Walsh	26,775	12.17
Shawn Nelson	10,512	4.78
Clifton A. Braithwaite	10,299	4.68
Catherine Vitale	8,560	3.89
Juwan Skeens write-in	113	0.05
all others	1,549	0.70
Total votes	219,965	100

2025 Boston at-large City Council election
Candidates	Preliminary election		General election	
Candidates	Votes	%	Votes	%
Ruthzee Louijeune (i)	45,500	18.7	54,885	19.2
Julia M. Mejia (i)	42,245	17.4	47,770	16.7
Erin J. Murphy (i)	38,981	16.0	46,709	16.4
Henry A. Santana (i)	30,670	12.6	44,206	15.5
Frank K. Baker	26,240	10.8	28,526	10.0
Alexandra E. Valdez	18,930	7.8	23,468	8.2
Marvin Mathelier	13,826	5.7	21,101	7.4
Will Onuoha	11,216	4.6	17,540	6.2
Yves Mary Jean	7,419	3.0		
Rachel Miselman	7,134	2.9		
Write-in	988	0.4		
Total	243,149	100	285,375	100
Turnout	93,168		96,405	

Political offices
Preceded by Althea Garrison	Member At-Large of the Boston City Council; 2020–present	Incumbent
