= 2019 Boston City Council election =

- November 5, 2019

Boston City Council elections were held on November 5, 2019. Nomination forms could be submitted starting April 17, and candidates had a filing deadline of May 21. A preliminary election was held on September 24. By law, Boston municipal elections are nonpartisan—candidates do not represent a specific political party.

For the four at-large seats: all four incumbents sought re-election. Election night results showed that three incumbents were re-elected, and one new at-large councillor was elected, by a margin of only 10 votes over the next-highest vote-getter. A recount of that race confirmed that result but by only a single vote.

For the nine district seats: six incumbents sought re-election; two were contested and four ran uncontested—election night results showed that all six were re-elected. Three new district councillors were elected, for seats where incumbents were not seeking re-election. All district winners won by comfortable margins.

Council members elected in November 2019 were inaugurated on January 6, 2020.

== Incumbents ==
The council members at the time of both the preliminary election and general election were as listed below. The table further indicates if each incumbent ran for re-election, and if so, whether they were re-elected or not.

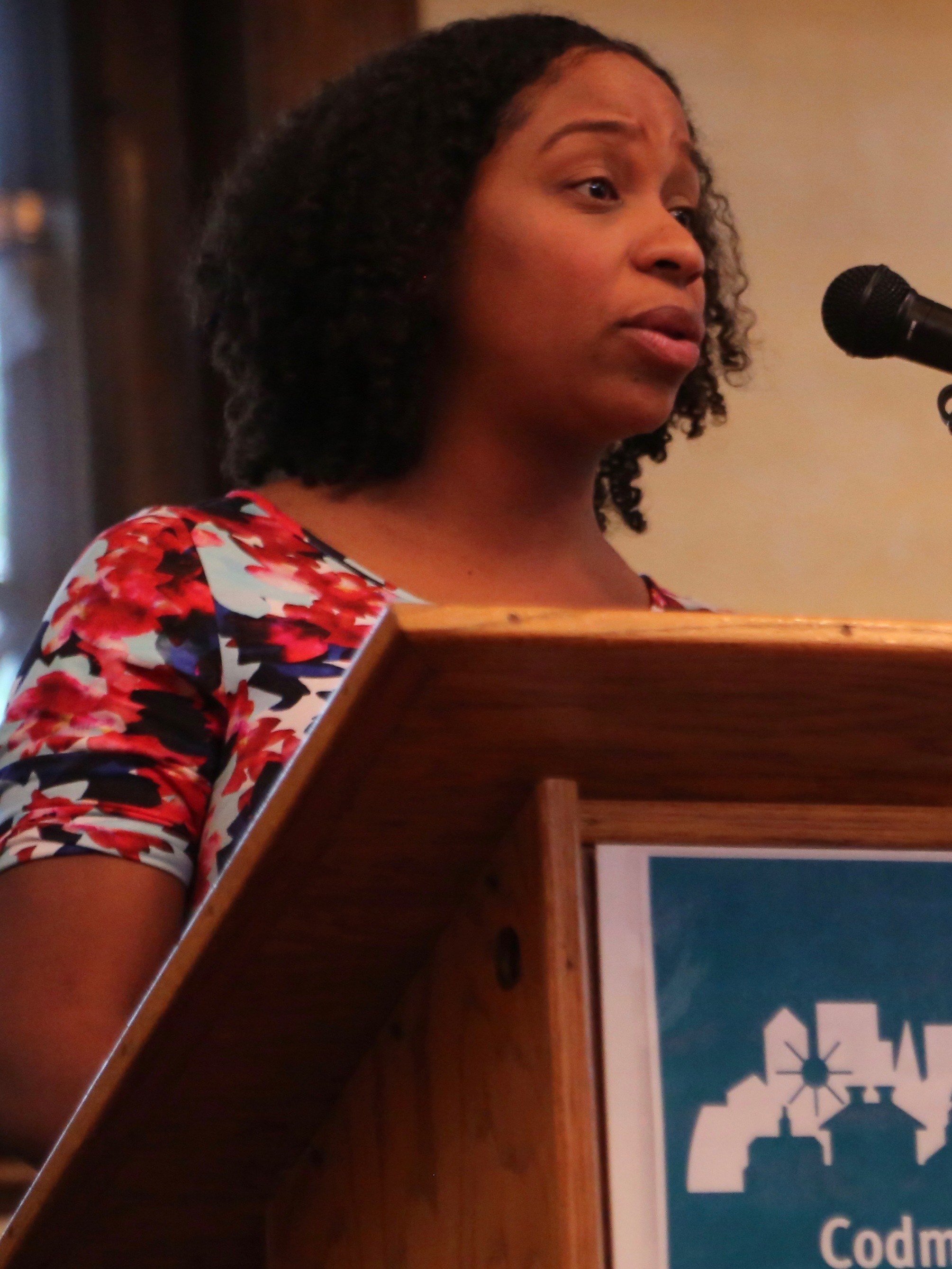
Council President Andrea Campbell

District	Name	Entered office	Ran	Re-elected	Ref.
At-large	Michelle Wu	January 2014	Yes	Yes	
At-large	Michael F. Flaherty	January 2014	Yes	Yes	
At-large	Annissa Essaibi George	January 2016	Yes	Yes	
At-large	Althea Garrison	January 2019‡	Yes	No	
1	Lydia Edwards	January 2018	Yes	Yes	
2	Ed Flynn	January 2018	Yes	Yes	
3	Frank Baker	January 2012	Yes	Yes	
4	Andrea Campbell†	January 2016	Yes	Yes	
5	Timothy McCarthy	January 2014	No (Note: On January 10, 2019, Timothy McCarthy announced that he would not seek re-election.)		
6	Matt O'Malley	November 2010	Yes	Yes	
7	Kim Janey	January 2018	Yes	Yes	
8	Josh Zakim	January 2014	No (Note: On March 21, 2019, Josh Zakim announced that he would not seek re-election.)		
9	Mark Ciommo	January 2008	No (Note: On April 2, 2019, Mark Ciommo announced that he would not seek re-election.)		

† Council President
‡ Filled vacancy created by resignation of Ayanna Pressley upon her election to the United States House of Representatives

== Logistics ==
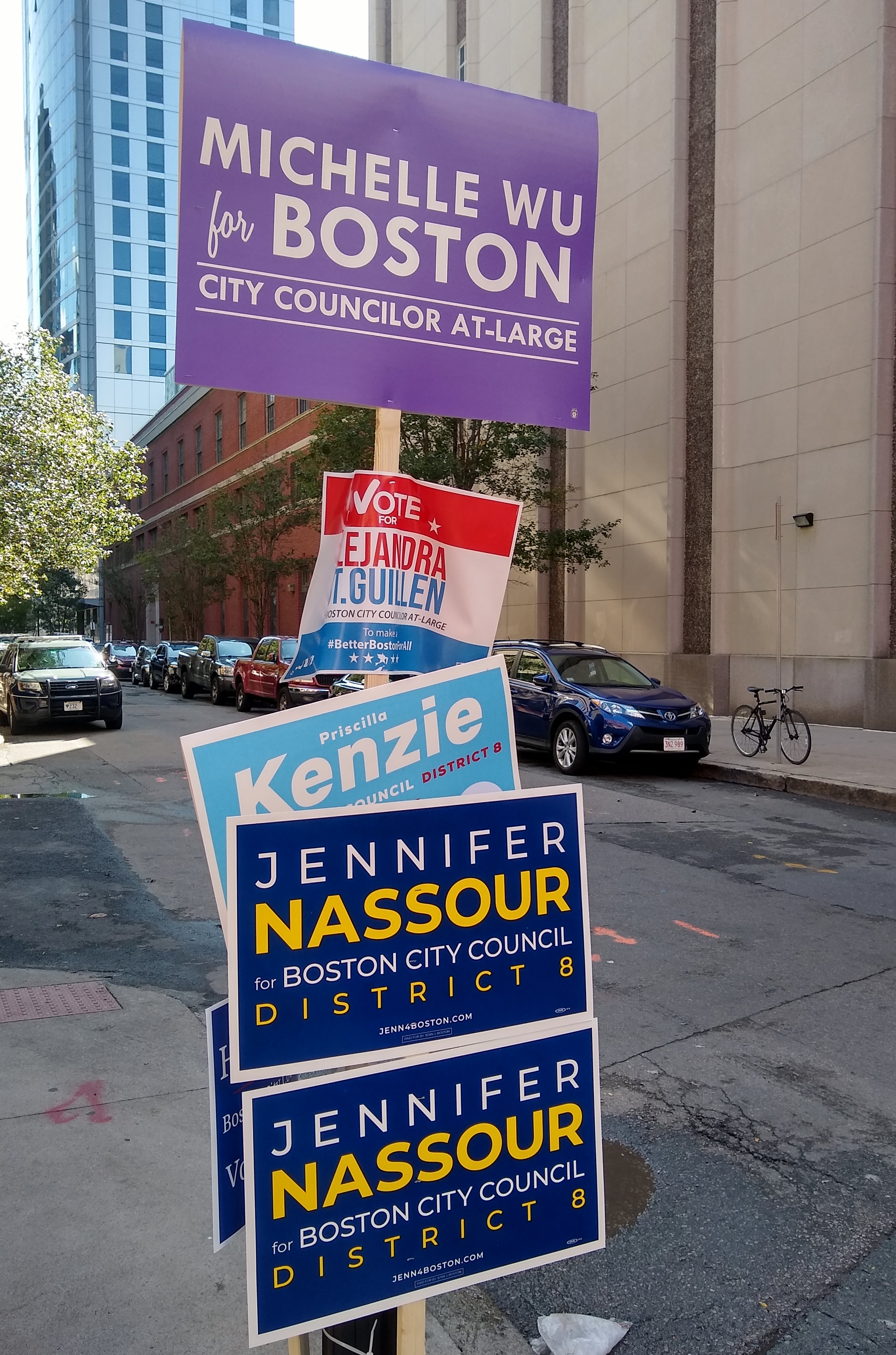
2019 Boston City Council preliminary election signs in front of polling location

A preliminary election was held on September 24 to select candidates for four districts, and at-large, for the general election. Voter turnout was 11.17%, as 44,972 of the city's 402,536 registered voters cast ballots. The general election was held on November 5, registering 16.5% voter turnout, as 67,011 ballots were cast.

== At-large election ==
The top eight vote-getters in the preliminary election qualified for the general election of four seats. Late on the night of the general election, with only a 10-vote margin between candidates for the final at-large seat, fifth-placed Alejandra Nicole St. Guillen called for a recount. The election department subsequently corrected the tallies of some hand-counted ballots, resulting in a margin of five votes as of November 13 (22,477 to 22,472), and tallied provisional ballots, resulting in a margin of eight votes on November 15 (22,500 to 22,492).

Boston election laws require that a candidate seeking a recount submit 50 signatures from registered voters within each ward (Note: Boston is divided into 22 wards.) where a recount is requested, within 10 days of the election. On November 15, St. Guillen submitted 2,000 signatures in support of a recount. Recount signatures, and the results in all other contests, were planned to be certified by Board of Election Commissioners on November 20. The date for the recount was subsequently announced as December 7. The result of the recount was announced on December 9, and confirmed Julia Mejia as winner of the final seat, by a margin of one vote—22,492 votes to 22,491 votes. On December 10, St. Guillen conceded the race, rather than appealing contested ballots.

Candidates	Preliminary election		General election		Recount	
Candidates	Votes	%	Votes	%	Votes	%
Michelle Wu (incumbent)	26,622	19.4	41,643	20.7		
Annissa Essaibi George (incumbent)	18,993	13.8	34,074	17.0		
Michael F. Flaherty (incumbent)	18,766	13.7	33,269	16.6		
Julia Mejia	10,799	7.9	22,477	11.2	22,492	—
Alejandra St. Guillen	11,910	8.7	22,472	11.2	22,491	—
Erin Murphy	9,385	6.8	16,853	8.4		
Althea Garrison (incumbent)	9,720	7.1	16,175	8.1		
David Halbert	6,354	4.8	13,209	6.6		
Martin Keogh	6,246	4.5				
Jeffrey Ross	5,078	3.7				
Priscilla Flint-Banks	4,094	3.0				
Domingos DaRosa	2,840	2.1				
Michel Denis	2,108	1.5				
William A. King	1,809	1.3				
Herb Lozano	1,510	1.1				
Write-in	766	0.6	890	0.4		
Total	137,380	100	201,014	100		

== District seat elections ==
=== District 1 ===
The incumbent, Lydia Edwards, ran unopposed.

Candidates	General election	
Candidates	Votes	%
Lydia Edwards (i)	4,398	96.6
Write-in	155	3.4
Total	4,553	100

=== District 2 ===
The incumbent, Ed Flynn, ran unopposed.

Candidates	General election	
Candidates	Votes	%
Ed Flynn (i)	6,367	97.0
Write-in	194	3.0
Total	6,561	100

=== District 3 ===
The incumbent, Frank Baker, ran unopposed.

Candidates	General election	
Candidates	Votes	%
Frank Baker (i)	4,826	95.4
Write-in	235	4.6
Total	5,061	100

=== District 4 ===
No preliminary election was necessary, as the only two candidates were listed on the general election ballot.

Candidates	General election	
Candidates	Votes	%
Andrea Campbell (i)	4,557	87.2
Jeff Durham	636	12.2
Write-in	35	0.7
Total	5,228	100

=== District 5 ===
The top two vote-getters in the preliminary election qualified for the general election.

Candidates	Preliminary election		General election	
Candidates	Votes	%	Votes	%
Ricardo Arroyo	2,235	29.5	5,329	54.5
Maria Esdale Farrell	1,813	23.4	4,399	45.0
Jean-Claude Sanon	1,156	15.3		
Mimi E. Turchinetz	1,098	14.5		
Alkia T Powell	572	7.6		
Cecily Leticia Graham	399	5.3		
Justin Matthew Murad	154	2.0		
Yves Mary Jean	123	1.6		
Write-in	12	0.2	40	0.4
Total	7,571	100	9,777	100

=== District 6 ===
The incumbent, Matt O'Malley, ran unopposed.

Candidates	General election	
Candidates	Votes	%
Matt O'Malley (i)	8,834	95.4
Write-in	427	4.6
Total	9,261	100

=== District 7 ===
The top two vote-getters in the preliminary election qualified for the general election.

Candidates	Preliminary election		General election	
Candidates	Votes	%	Votes	%
Kim Janey (i)	2,145	70.0	3,852	74.5
Roy Owens Sr.	517	16.8	1,266	24.5
Valerie Hope Rust	381	12.4		
Write-in	24	0.8	53	1.0
Total	3,069	100	5,178	100

† Candidate for re-election

=== District 8 ===
The top two vote-getters in the preliminary election qualified for the general election.

Candidates	Preliminary election		General election	
Candidates	Votes	%	Votes	%
Priscilla Kenzie Bok	2,032	50.4	3,662	70.1
Jennifer Ann Nassour	740	18.3	1,540	29.5
Helene Vincent	587	14.6		
Kristen Mobilia	511	12.7		
Montez David Haywood	149	3.7		
Write-in	14	0.3	23	0.4
Total	4,039	100	5,229	100

Nassour sought to become the first self-identified (as Boston municipal elections are non-partisan) Republican elected to the City Council since John W. Sears in November 1979.

=== District 9 ===
The top two vote-getters in the preliminary election qualified for the general election.

Candidates	Preliminary election		General election	
Candidates	Votes	%	Votes	%
Liz Breadon	1,129	23.5	3,885	58.5
Craig R. Cashman	1,218	25.4	2,728	41.1
Brandon David Bowser	763	16.0		
Daniel J. Daly	656	13.7		
Lee Nave Jr.	466	9.7		
Jonathan Lamar Allen	456	9.5		
Amanda Gail Smart	103	2.2		
Write-in	3	0.1	28	0.4
Total	4,813	100	6,648	100

== Endorsements ==
Prior to the preliminary election:

- The Boston Globe endorsed Ricardo Arroyo in District 5, Kenzie Bok in District 8, and Craig Cashman in District 9. For at-large seats, the Globe endorsed incumbents Michelle Wu and Michael Flaherty, and newcomers David Halbert and Alejandra St. Guillen.
- Planned Parenthood endorsed Annissa Essaibi George, Michael Flaherty, and Michelle Wu for at-large seats, along with Lydia Edwards in District 1, Andrea Campbell in District 4, Matt O'Malley in District 6, and Kim Janey in District 7.
- The Massachusetts chapter of the Sierra Club endorsed Andrea Campbell in District 4, and Kim Janey in District 7.
- SEIU 32BJ (Service Employees International Union), SEIU Local 615 endorsed at-large candidates Julia Mejia, Alejandra St. Guillen, Annissa Essaibi George, and Michelle Wu; and endorsed Ricardo Arroyo in District 5, Kim Janey in District 7, and Kenzie Bok in District 8.
- Local 25 of the International Brotherhood of Teamsters endorsed Michael Flaherty, Michelle Wu, and Annissa Essaibi George for at-large seats, along with Lydia Edwards in District 1, Ed Flynn in District 2, Frank Baker in District 3, Andrea Campbell in District 4, Maria Esdale Farrell in District 5, Matt O'Malley in District 6, Kim Janey in District 7, and Daniel Daly in District 9.
- EMILY's List endorsed Lydia Edwards, Kim Janey, Michelle Wu, Annissa Essaibi George, and Andrea Campbell.
- Massachusetts Attorney General Maura Healey endorsed Michelle Wu and Annissa Essaibi George.
- Mayor of Boston Marty Walsh endorsed Alejandra St. Guillen and Annissa Essaibi George.

Prior to the general election:

- The Massachusetts chapter of the Sierra Club endorsed Kenzie Bok in District 8.
- The LGBTQ Victory Fund endorsed Liz Breadon in District 9 and Alejandra St. Guillen for an at-large seat.

== Nonbinding advisory question ==
A non-binding advisory question was added to the November 5, 2019, ballot for all Boston residents asking, "Do you support the renaming/changing of the name of Dudley Square to Nubian Square?" Election night results show that the question was defeated:

Question 1	Votes	%
Yes	24,224	45.70
No	28,787	54.30

Mayor of Boston Marty Walsh subsequently announced that the question had "passed in the surrounding areas" near the square, 1,990 to 958, and could be considered further by the city's Public Improvement Commission. On December 19, 2019, the Public Improvement Commission unanimously approved changing the name of Dudley Square to Nubian Square.
