= Benjamin Weber (politician) =

American politician

Member-elect of the Ohio House of Representatives from the 86th district
- Assuming office January 1, 2027
- Succeeding: Tracy Richardson

Personal details
- Party: Republican
- Website: Official website

Benjamin (Ben) Weber is an American politician who is the member-elect for the 86th district of the Ohio House of Representatives, succeeding to the office on January 1, 2027. He was elected in the 2026 election. He is a constitutional attorney from Marysville, Ohio. He is originally from Delaware County, Ohio.
