= Ed Flynn (politician) =

American politician

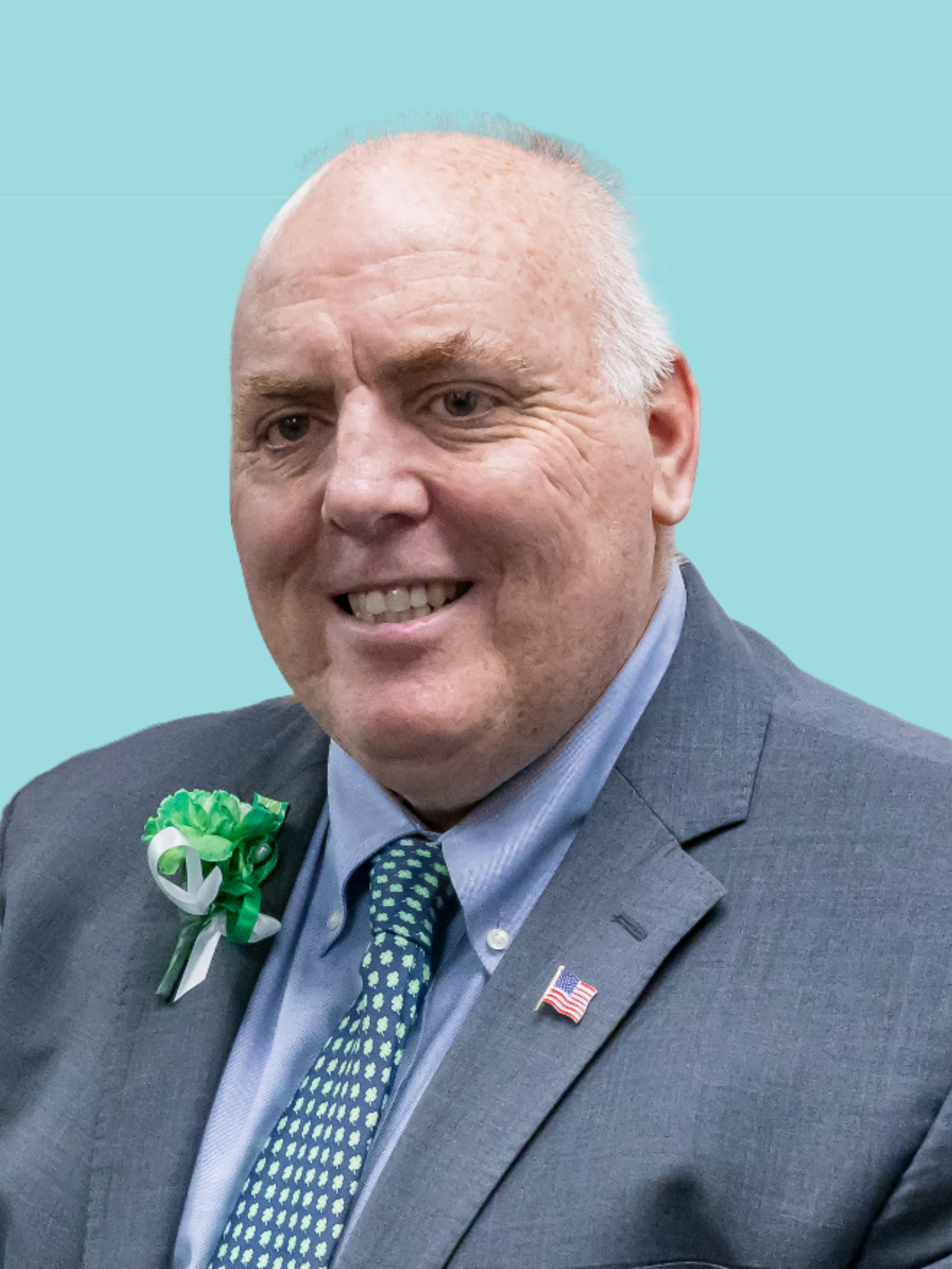
- Flynn in 2024

President of the Boston City Council
- In office January 3, 2022 – January 1, 2024
- Preceded by: Kim Janey
- Succeeded by: Ruthzee Louijeune

Member of the Boston City Council from District 2
- Incumbent
- Assumed office January 1, 2018
- Preceded by: Bill Linehan

Personal details
- Party: Democratic
- Spouse: Kristen
- Children: 2
- Parents: Raymond Flynn (father); Catherine Coyne (mother)

Military service
- Allegiance: United States
- Branch/service: U.S. Navy

Edward Michael Flynn is an American politician currently serving on the Boston City Council, representing the city's 2nd district. A member of the Democratic Party, he has held his seat since January 2018. From January 2022 until January 2024, he served as president of the Boston City Council. He is the son of former Boston mayor Raymond Flynn. He is regarded to be one of the city council's most moderate members, and has been alternatively described as being conservative-leaning.

Flynn spent 24 years in the United States Navy and the United States Navy Reserve. He served as a legislative affairs specialist at the United States Department of Labor for five years during the Clinton administration, working on matters related to expanding access to affordable healthcare and efforts to increase federal minimum wage. He also previously worked as a probation officer in the Suffolk Superior Court and a substitute teacher.

In 2005, Flynn unsuccessfully ran for an at-large seat on the Boston City Council, placing eighth in the general election for four seats. In 2007, Flynn unsuccessfully ran in a special election for the 2nd district seat on the Boston City Council, placing third in the nonpartisan primary. In 2017, Flynn succeeded in his third campaign for city council, narrowly winning an open election for the 2nd district seat. Flynn has since been reelected three times without opposition (in 2019, 2021, and 2023). After joining the council, Flynn was a strong advocate for the passage of city regulations on short-term rentals, which were ultimately adopted in 2018. In his third term on the council (2021–2022) Flynn served as the council's president. During his term as president, the council carried out the process of adopting a map for its decennial redistricting which proved contentious.

== Early life and career ==
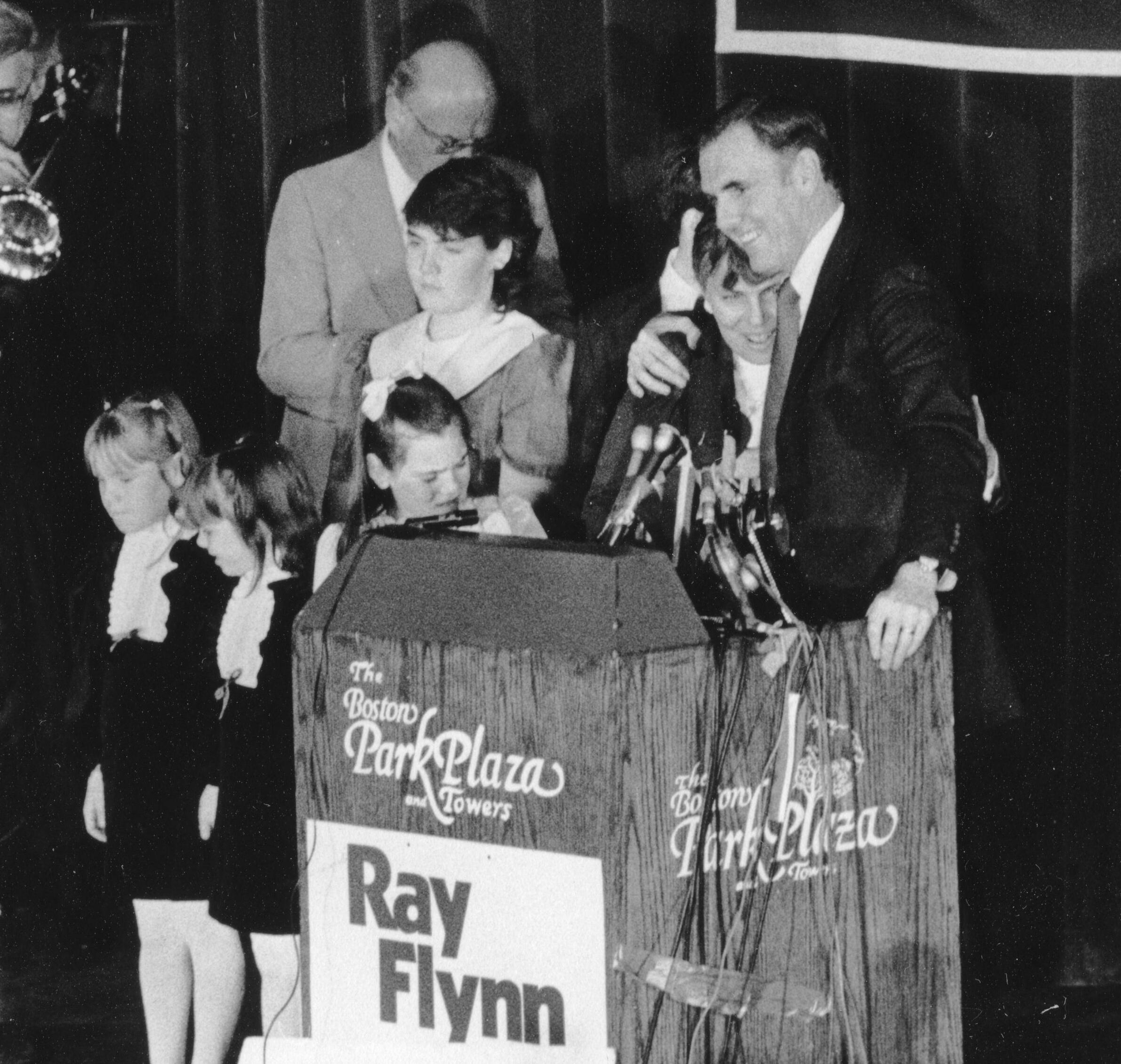
Flynn and his siblings join his father at the victory party for his father (Raymond Flynn) on the night of the 1983 Boston mayoral election

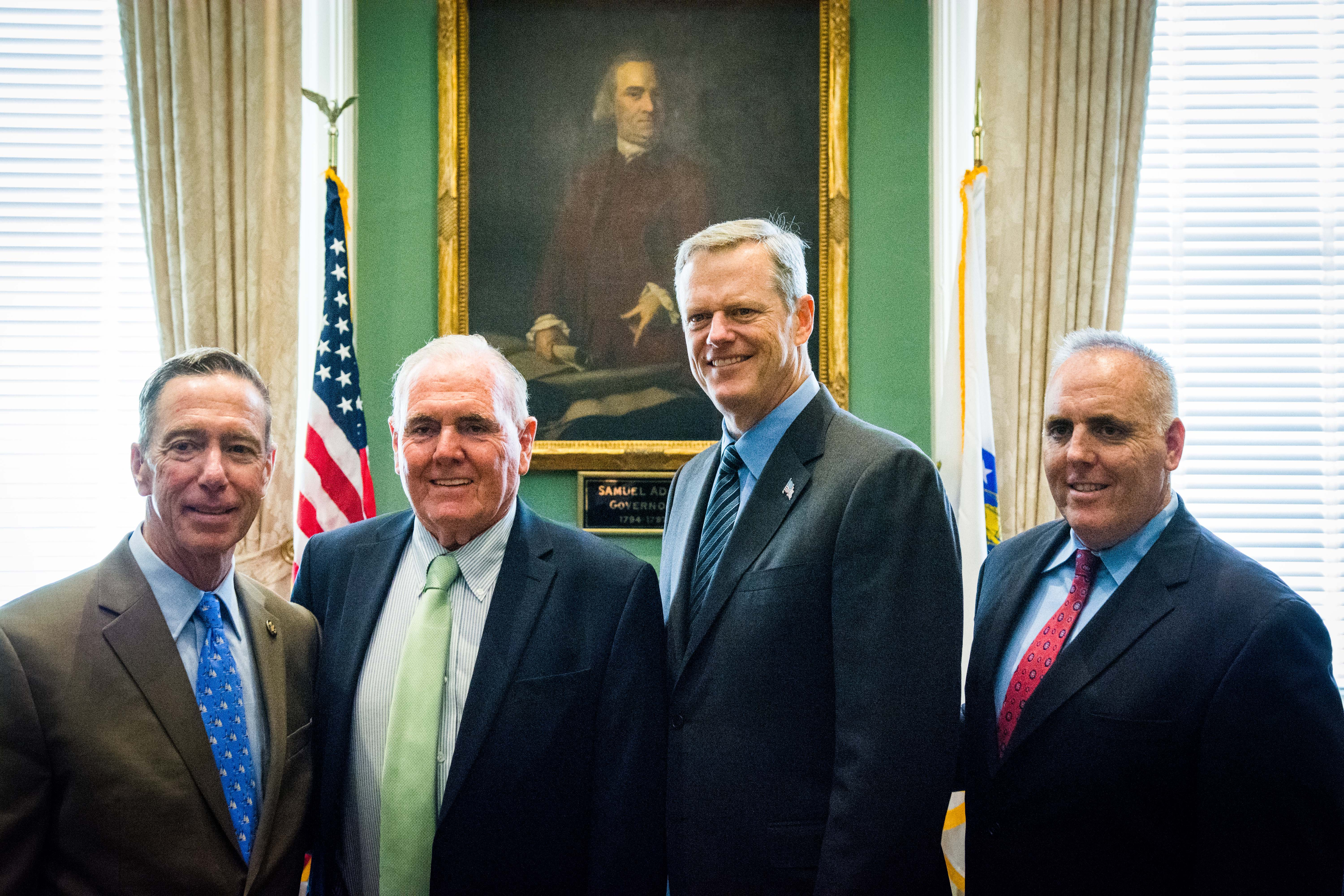
Flynn (far right) in 2016 with Congressman Stephen Lynch, Flynn's father Raymond Flynn, and Governor Charlie Baker

Flynn was born to Raymond Flynn and Kathy Flynn (née Coyne). Flynn's father was mayor of Boston from 1984 through 1993, and was also an ambassador of the United States to the Holy See from 1993 through 1997, a member of the Boston City Council from 1978 through 1984, and a member of the Massachusetts House of Representatives from 1971 through 1978.

Flynn was one of six siblings. Flynn graduated from Boston's Don Bosco Technical High School and from Newport, Rhode Island's Salve Regina College, where he studied history and government.

Flynn served in the United States Navy and United States Naval Reserve for 24 years, becoming a second-class petty officer. He served active duty at Joint Task Force Guantanamo, and had further service abroad in the United States Naval Reserves. His military service included Operation Enduring Freedom.

Flynn worked as a probation officer in the Suffolk Superior Court, as a legislative affairs specialist at the United States Department of Labor during the Clinton administration, and as a transportation logistical specialist for the 2005 United States presidential inauguration. At the Department of Labor he worked on matters related to expanding access to affordable healthcare and efforts to increase the federal minimum wage.

In 2005, Flynn permanently moved back to Boston from Washington, D.C., settling in South Boston and beginning work as a substitute teacher at Charlestown High School. By the time he was elected to the Boston City Council in 2017, Flynn had held membership in a number of Bostonian civic organizations, including the Cityside Neighborhood Association, Veterans of Foreign Wars Thomas M. Fitzgerald Post, Ward 7 Democratic Committee, and South Boston Citizens' Association.

== Unsuccessful 2005 and 2007 Boston City Council campaigns ==
In April 2005, a month after resettling in Boston, Flynn declared that he had intended to run for an at-large seat in the 2005 Boston City Council election. He cited youth substance abuse as a key issue he intended to focus on, declaring that, "OxyContin and heroin are an epidemic now, in every neighborhood. I would like to try to get the business community involved". Flynn advanced from the nonpartisan primary election to the general election, but was unsuccessful, placing eighth in the race for four at-large seats.

In 2007, Flynn ran in the second district special election to fill the seat left vacant by the death in office of James M. Kelly. He placed third in the nonpartisan primary election behind Susan M. Passoni and Bill Linehan, thus failing to advance to the general election.

== 2017 election to the Boston City Council ==
In February 2017 District 2 Councilor Bill Linehan announced he was not seeking reelection and Flynn was considered a potential candidate.

During the campaign, Flynn was considered the front-runner. Among those who endorsed his candidacy were Congressman Stephen F. Lynch, retiring City Councilor Bill Linehan, City Councilor Michael F. Flaherty, and State Representative Nick Collins. He was also endorsed by a number of trade unions, as well as the Chinese Progressive Association.

Among the issues that Flynn pledged would be a priority for him if he was elected was addressing the problem of domestic violence. He invoked the work his mother had done as the city's first lady to support survivors of domestic violence, promising to continue her work.

Flynn narrowly won the election, defeating LGBTQ activist Mike Kelley with 52% of the vote.

== First council term (2018–2019) ==
Flynn took office, becoming only the third individual to hold the council's 2nd district seat since it was established in 1984. After joining the council, Flynn stopped working as a probation officer at the Suffolk Superior Court.

In December 2018, the Boston City Council unanimously voted to pass an ordinance that Flynn authored with Lydia Edwards that extended the period of repayment for back taxes by low-income elder residents, and forgave interest.

During campaigning, Flynn supported restricting short-term rentals. In June 2018, Flynn voted for an ordinance which regulated short-term rentals in the city by restricting short-term rentals to owner-occupied housing units, requiring hosts to register with the city, and requiring the city to collect and publish data on short-term rentals The ordinance's adoption was endorsed both by then-City Council President Michelle Wu and then-mayor Marty Walsh. In hearings prior to its 11-2 adoption by the City Council, Flynn supported the ordinance. He argued that it would preserve the ability for neighborhoods like Chinatown to accommodate working-class immigrants as residents, and highlighted a need to, "defend our communities from commercialization, investor speculation and to protect the fabric of our neighborhoods." In late-2019, Flynn partnered with Councilwomen Wu and Edwards to hold a hearing meant to identify possible loopholes in the enforcement of the short-term rental regulation ordinance adopted the previous year.

== Second council term (2020–2021) ==
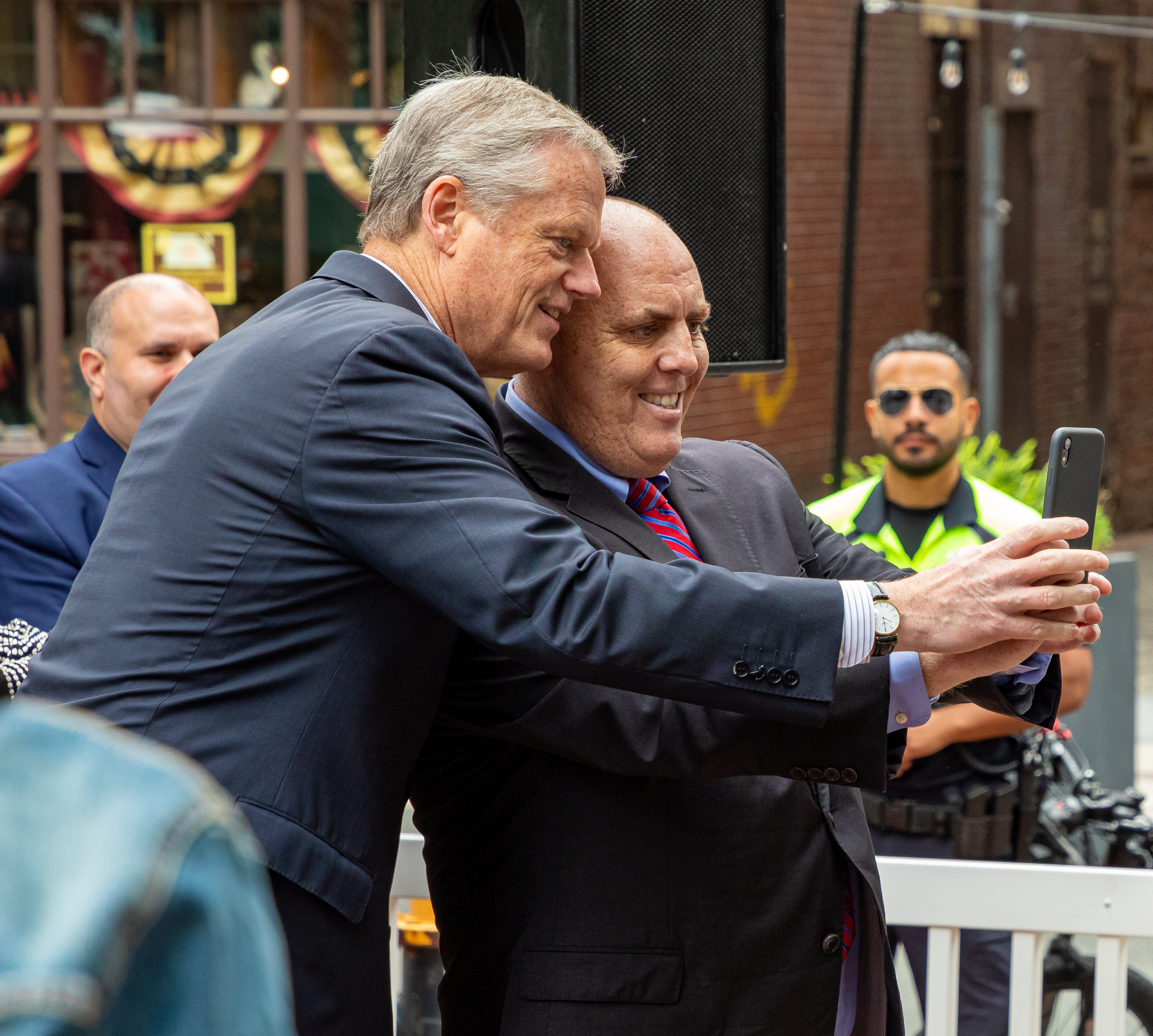
Flynn takes a selfie with Governor Baker in July 2021

Flynn ran unopposed and was reelected in 2019.

In the early weeks of the COVID-19 pandemic impacting the United States, Flynn introduced a resolution to express the council's support towards the city's Chinese and broader Asian communities. The city's Chinatown neighborhood had suffered more pronounced economic hardship in that stage of the pandemic than other areas of the city, likely due to negative attitudes towards the Chinese due to perceptions related to the pandemic's origins in China.

In 2021, Flynn voted against legislation that was passed by the City Council which restricted the use of rubber bullets, tear gas, and pepper spray by the Boston Police Department. After the legislation was passed in January 2021, it was vetoed by Mayor Walsh. However, after Walsh resigned the office of mayor to become United States secretary of labor and Council President Kim Janey became acting mayor, the resolution was again brought to a vote. Flynn again voted against it, but the resolution was passed by the council and signed into law by Acting Mayor Janey.

== Third council term (2022–2023) ==
Flynn ran unopposed and was reelected to his city council seat in 2021.

=== Election as council president ===
Flynn successfully sought the council presidency, a position which is elected though a vote of council members. The campaign process for those seeking the presidency typically occurs behind closed doors, with the contenders privately lobbying and negotiating with members of the council for their votes. Initially, after the new council had been elected, rumors initially arose that Kenzie Bok had secured the backing of enough city council members to be elected the City Council's president for its 2022–23 term. It would later be reported by the press that sources confirmed was initially the case, but that Flynn (who had initially pledged to support Bok for president) and two additional councilors decided to withdraw their backing of her candidacy, and instead partnered with a coalition of newly elected freshman members to support Flynn for the position (thereby giving Flynn sufficient support to win the presidency).

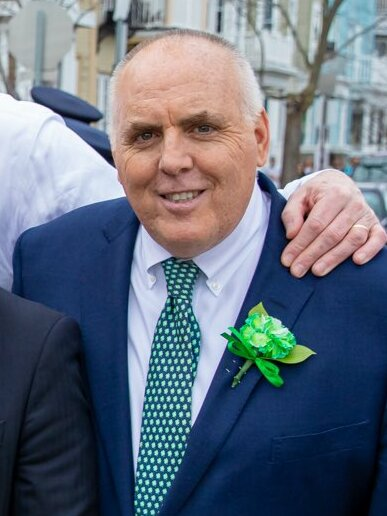
Flynn at the 2022 Boston St. Patrick's Day Parade

On December 1, 2021, Flynn announced in a press release that he had secured guarantees of support from enough council members that he was confident he would be voted by the city council to serve as its president of the Boston City Council during its 2022–23 term. WGBH-TV reported that numerous sources had informed them that Flynn had indeed received support from enough councilors to win the position. It was reported that the councilors who had rival efforts for the council presidency had been Ricardo Arroyo and Kenzie Bok. It was noted that it was possible that councilors could potentially shift their support before the January vote. However, upon Flynn's apparent success in securing sufficient backing to become council president, Arroyo released a statement that acted as an informal concession of sorts, giving strong praise to Flynn's kindness and work ethic, and declaring that he looked forward, "to seeing how he utilizes those great qualities in this leadership role." Flynn ultimately was elected unanimously to the council presidency in the formal vote.

=== Council politics ===
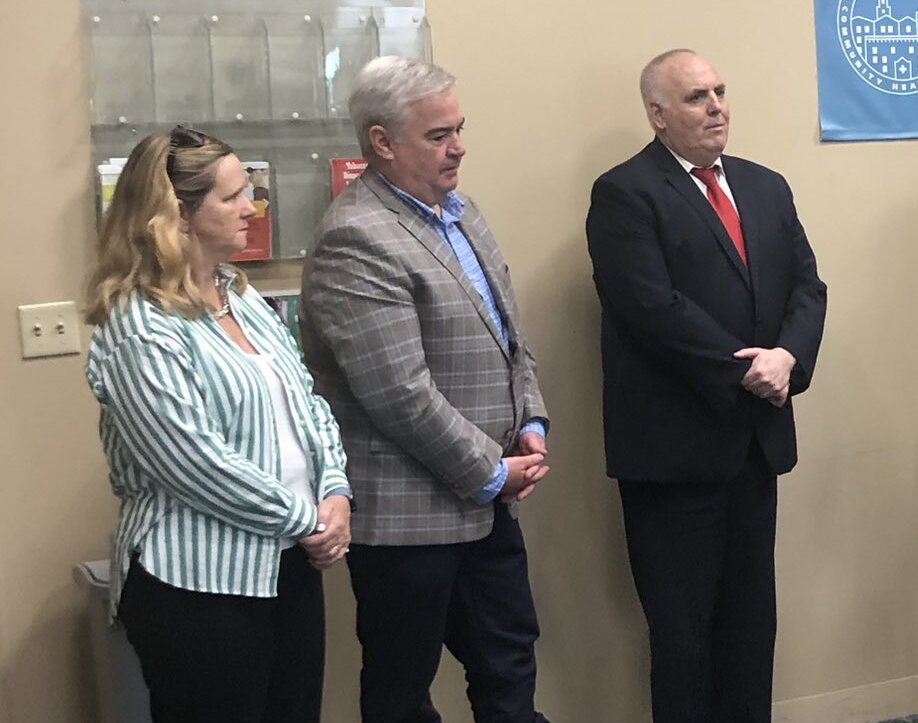
(L–R): Councilor Erin Murphy, Councilor Michael F. Flaherty, and Flynn at the South Boston Health Center in July 2023

During his third council term, Flynn was joined councilors Frank Baker, Michael F. Flaherty, and Erin Murphy in an informal grouping that often functioned as a centrist/conservative voting bloc.

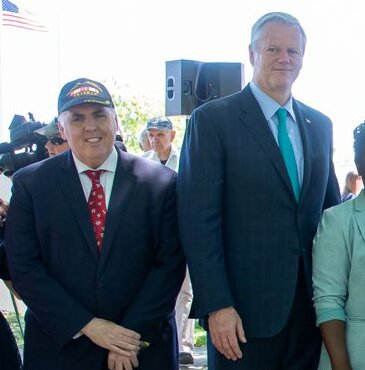
Flynn (left) and Governor Charlie Baker in June 2022

During Flynn's council presidency, Michelle Wu was mayor. Wu is considered to be significantly more of a political progressive than Flynn, who himself is regarded to be one of the council's most moderate members. Flynn was occasionally described as a critic of Wu. However, during his tenure as council president, Flynn personally stated that he had a good working relationship with Wu and that he saw it as important to collaborate with her mayoral administration. At the end of his council presidency, Flynn responded to a reporter's question on his opinion of Mayor Wu's job performance by saying, "I think she's done a good job. I'm close with the mayor personally. I like her, I respect her." Despite initial expectations that the Boston City Council would wield more power than it previously had, during Flynn's' tenure as president, Mayor Wu generally prevailed in instances where she and the City Council were at odds. Emma Platoff of The Boston Globe credited Wu's ability to frequently prevail on matters where she and the City Council were not aligned to Wu's own "political savvy", the strong legal power afforded to mayors of Boston, divisions on the City Council that give the body a weaker negotiating position, and the inexperience of new council members. Adrian Walker of The Boston Globe has opined that Flynn had not been particularly successful in his role as council president, characterizing Flynn's tenure as council president as having been "unimpressive, to put it mildly."

As council president, Flynn suspended Councilman Ricardo Arroyo from his committee chairmanships after it was reported in The Boston Globe that Arroyo had been investigated for sexual assault in 2005 and 2007 without being charged for a crime. Flynn reappointed Councilor Arroyo to his Chairmanships after half the Council rose to demand he do so during a council meeting. In July 2023, Flynn published an open letter on Twitter which criticized Councilman Arroyo's sexual assault scandals and Councilwoman Kendra Lara's scandal involving unsafe driving charges as being "ethical and legal lapses" that "draw negative attention" on the council.

=== Mass & Cass ===
As city council president, Flynn considered the homelessness situation at Mass & Cass to be a priority matter. In September 2023, Flynn and councilors Baker, Flaherty, and Murphy signed a letter asking the Boston Public Health Commission to declare the situation at Mass & Cass to be a public health emergency, which was rejected. In October 2023, Flynn voted for the mayor's ordinance to prohibit temporary shelters such as tents from the Mass & Cass area. The ordinance passed 9–3.

In early August 2023, when Mayor Wu left the city on a ten-day family vacation, Flynn took advantage of a provision in Boston City Charter which gives the city council president the authority of an "acting mayor" when the mayor is away from the city. Wu had remained in regular contact with her staff during her leave, and did not instruct Flynn to take any actions on her behalf. Despite this, Flynn on his own accord took actions that generated headlines during this period of time. After Wu left, Flynn text messaged a statement to the Boston Herald in which he declared,

As acting mayor and city council president, I will continue to work closely with Mayor Wu and our colleagues in government to address [the homelessness situation at Mass & Cass], as well as other pressing issues in our city, such as transportation, public education and services for seniors and persons with disabilities.

During Wu's vacation, Flynn took a tour of Mass & Cass police officers and speaking to reporters about the situation there. While Wu had been speaking on matters related to Mass & Cass just prior to her family vacation, she had not instructed Flynn to take any actions on it during her vacation. Boston Herald political writer Joe Battenfeld has characterized Flynn's media-publicized trip to Mass & Cass as a "power grab", and has also opined that it was entirely unnecessary for Flynn to perform any actions as acting mayor during Wu's vacation. In 2024, Battenfeld retrospectively observed that Flynn's attempt to assert himself as the acting mayor had created lasting tension between him and Wu.

=== Redistricting dispute ===
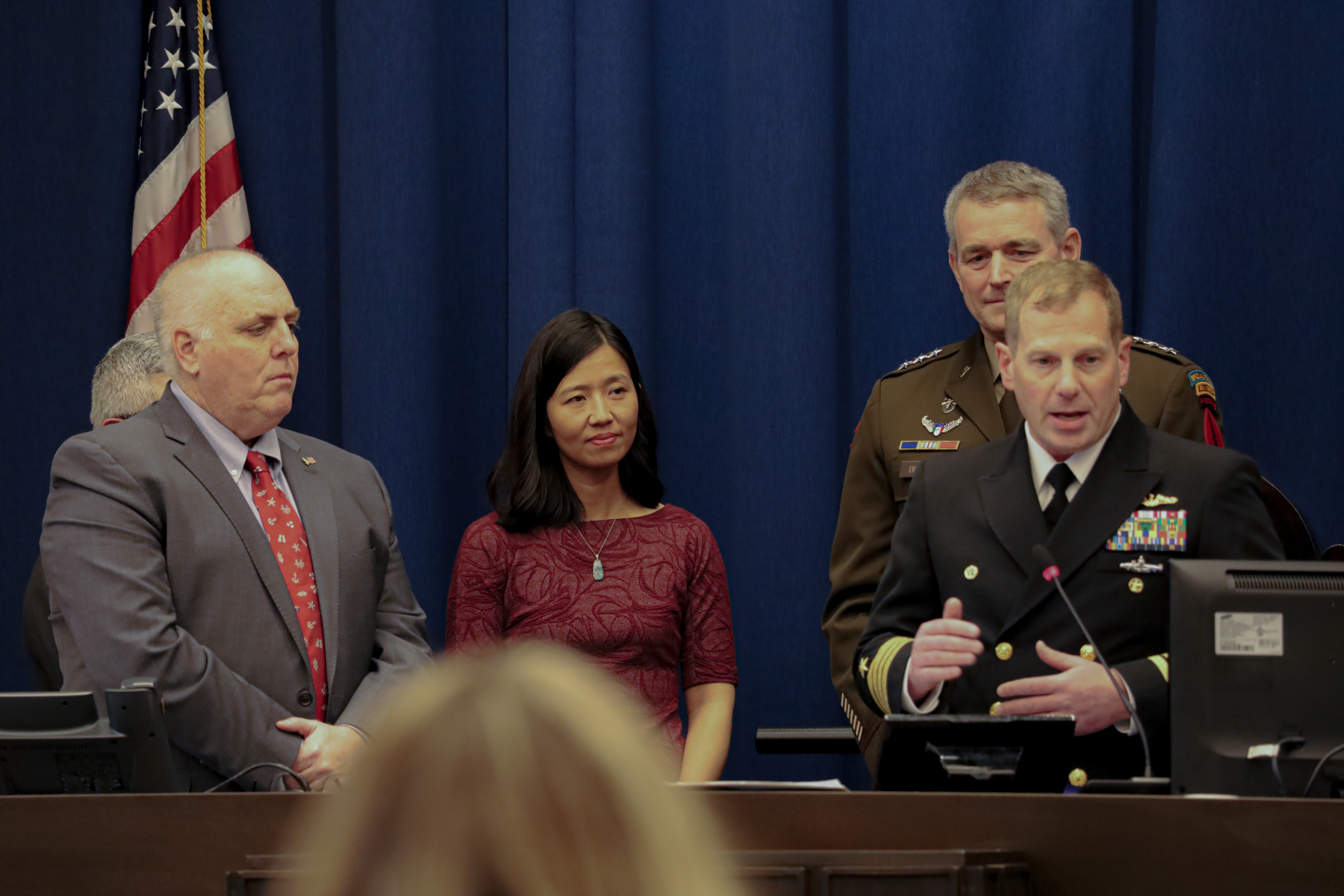
Flynn and Mayor Wu listen as U.S. Army Lt. Gen. Jonathan Braga and U.S. Navy Capt. Henry Roenke address the Boston City Council in celebration of the 2023 Army–Navy Game being held in the Boston-area

Flynn was one of four Boston city councilors that voted against the council's redistricting map that was initially approved by the City Council after the 2020 United States Census and which and Mayor Wu passed into law in November 2022. Flynn took particular issue with the fact that the map placed two large South Boston public housing developments in different city council districts. Flynn had desired to keep all of South Boston and the South End in the boundaries of his own district, which the new map did not do. The map would have shifted three voting precincts that have historically been predominantly Irish American into a ward that is Black-majority. While Yawu Miller of the Bay State Banner described Flynn as having been "civil" in expressing his opposition, he alleged that the four councilor's oppositions were grounded in "white grievance politics". It was noted by Michael Jonas of Commonwealth Magazine that the four city councilors to vote against the map were all White and politically moderate. Before it was adopted, Flynn had fought and attempted to stall the adoption of the new map and proposed to instead have an independent panel draw the new map. The map that Flynn was against was ultimately prohibited by preliminary injunction from being used in the 2023 Boston City Council election after a ruling by Federal Judge Patti Saris. Flynn had given $10,000 of his own money to help fund the litigation that had challenged the map. After the judicial ruling, Flynn tasked Councilor Ruthzee Louijeune, head of the Boston City Council's Civil Rights Committee, to oversee the process of drawing a map to be used in the 2023 Boston City Council election instead of Liz Breadon, the head of the Redistricting Committee. The resulting map was adopted by the council in a 10–2 vote and signed into law by Mayor Wu.

=== Other matters during third term ===
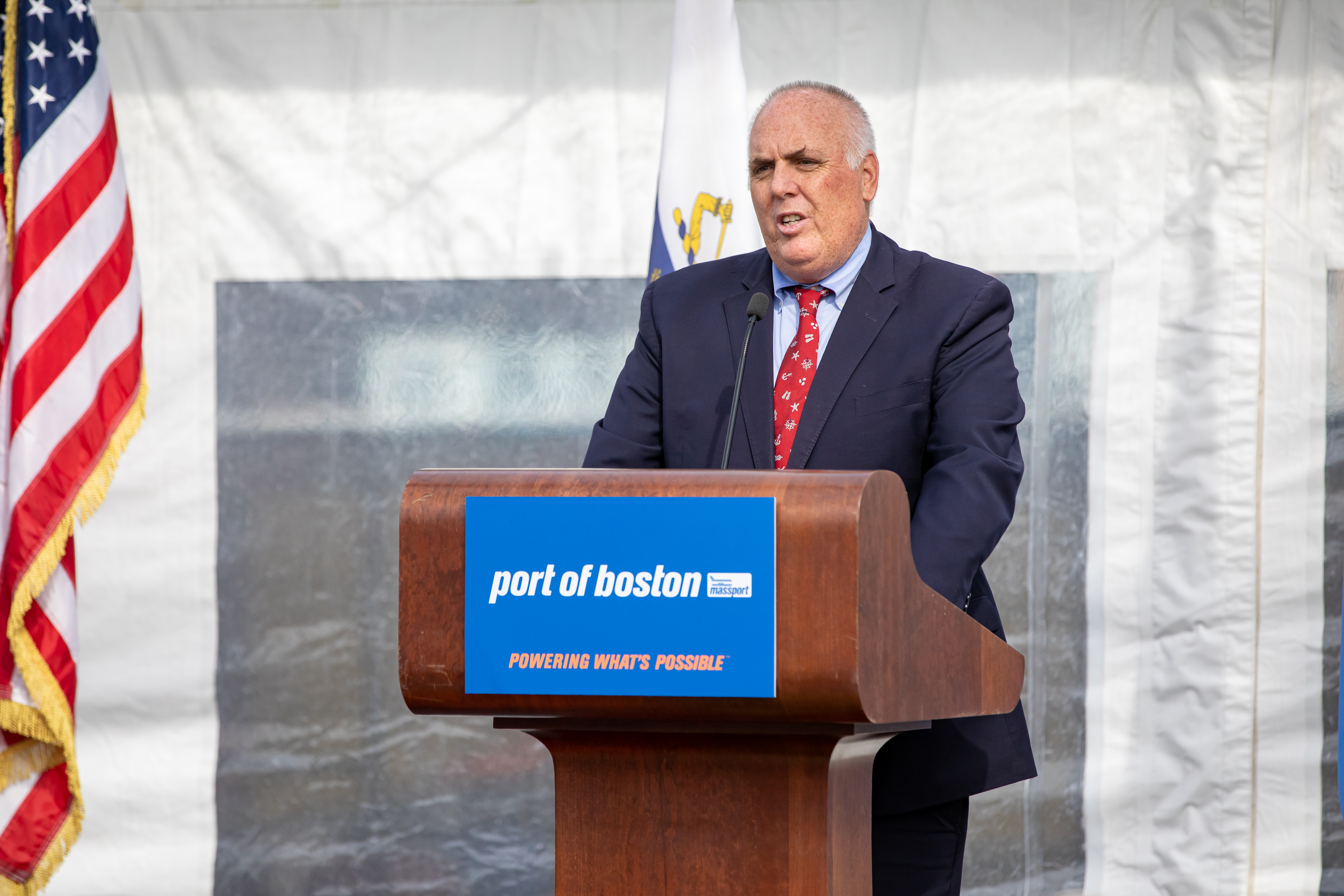
Flynn speaks at the October 2022 ribbon cutting ceremony for the Conley Terminal modernization project

In early 2022, Flynn publicly endorsed ordinance proposed by Wu which limited the hours during which targeted protests would be permitted outside of private residences, with violations punishable by fine. Wu herself had been the subject of targeted protests outside of her personal residence, and the ordinance generated controversy. The ordinance was approved by the council in a 9–4 vote in March 2022.

In August 2022, ahead of month-long closure of a key segment of the MBTA Orange Line, Flynn and several other city councilors wrote a letter to the MBTA that requested additional shuttle bus service to Chinatown during the closure.

Flynn authored an ordinance requiring bars, restaurants, and gyms in the city to display close captioning on their television in order to accommodate those with hearing disabilities. It was signed into law by Mayor Wu in December 2022. In 2023, Flynn stated that he considered the 6% plus CPI cap that Mayor Wu placed in the rent stabilization home rule petition she placed before the City Council to be a "reasonable" compromise. In May 2023, Flynn proposed that the Boston City Council adopt an official no-tolerance policy for bullying by members, their staff, and other council employees. Flynn voiced his desire for Boston to follow New York City's lead and hire a "rat czar" to address steps to decrease the city's rat population. In late November 2023, a proposal by Flynn to establish a committee dedicated to the issue of domestic violence was rejected in a City Council. Opponents of the proposal argued that it duplicated the work of an existing committee.

In June 2023, Flynn voted against an amended budget that was approved by the City Council 7–5. The vote had largely been along racial lines, with Flynn and the other four city councilors who voted against the budget all being white, and all but one city councilor who voted for the amendment being persons of color. Flynn voiced strong opposition to budget amendments that included a decrease to the city's Department of Veterans Services and the city's police budget. Both of those amendments that Flynn cited specific opposition to were vetoed by Mayor Wu.

In 2023, Flynn spoke in support of Israel during the Gaza war. In December 2023, Flynn criticized other councilors for voting against a bill that would have allowed the city to accept a federal grant for counterterrorism measures. The bill had failed to pass in a 6–6 vote that month. Flynn voted against a home rule petition that would seek state approval for Boston to extend voting participation in municipal elections (local elections for city offices) to non-citizen residents with legal status. Flynn was allegedly involved in the illegal leak of an internal Council staff complaint that was photographed and sent to the Boston Herald. The geotag data traced the photographs directly to Flynn's South Boston home.

== Fourth term (2024–2025) ==
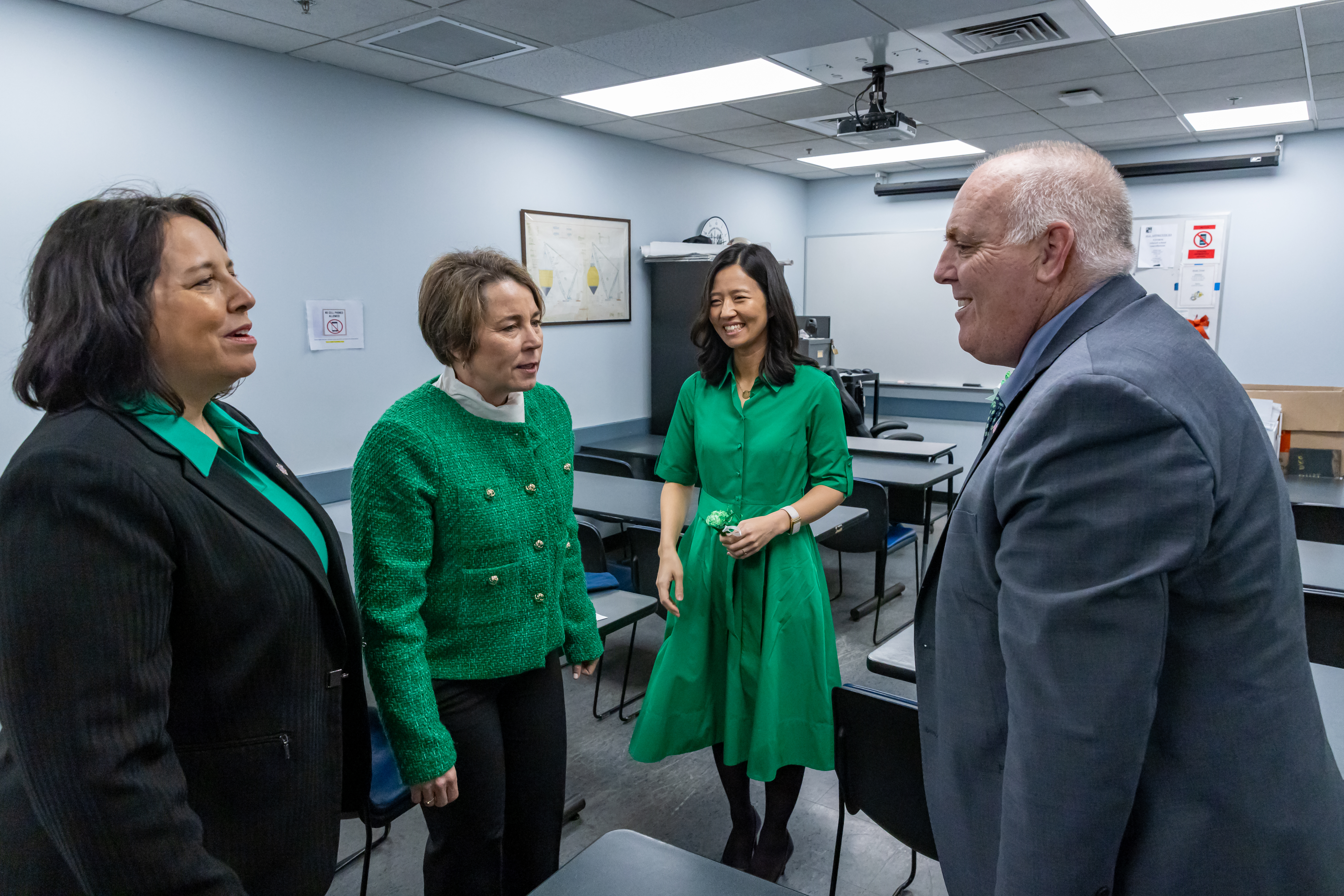
Flynn (right) speaks with Lieutenant Governor Kim Driscoll, Governor Maura Healey, and Mayor Wu at the 2024 South Boston St. Patrick's Day Breakfast

Flynn ran unopposed in the 2023 Boston City Council election and was reelected.

Baker and Flaherty retired from the council at the end of the previous term, leaving Flynn and Murphy as the sole returning members of the voting bloc. However, new councilor John FitzGerald joined Murphy and Flynn on the council's de facto bloc of conservative-leaning councilors. Towards the end of his fourth term, Tréa Lavery of MassLive described Flynn as having been one of the two "loudest critics" of Mayor Wu serving on the council during the two year council term.

At the January 2024 inaugural session of the new city council term, Flynn nominated Julia Mejia to serve as the council's president. Both Flynn and councilor Murphy had (at the last minute) been encouraging Mejia to run against Ruthzee Louijeune. Mejia declined to be a candidate, and Louijeune was unanimously elected as the council president.

=== "Rat czar" ordinance ===
In January 2024, Flynn revived his proposal from the previous year of creating a dedicated "rat czar" position to lead the city's pest control. Flynn introduced a resolution that would create an Office of Pest Control headed by a "director of pest control". Flynn partnered with Liz Breadon in promoting this proposal, which would create a standalone pest control agency. This is unlike the example of New York City, whose "rat czar" is housed within its health department. This would centralize leadership on pest control, responsibility for which is currently shared between the Department of Public Works, the city's inspectional services, and the city's water and sewer commission. On January 31, the council unanimously adopted Flynn's ordinance, placing it on the mayor's desk. While voicing their intention of creating a "rat czar" position to lead the city's efforts at pest control, officials from the mayor's office opposed making such a person the head of a standalone pest control agency, instead voicing a preference to improve the city's existing framework of using multiple agencies to address pest control.

=== Trip to Israel ===
In January 2024, Flynn traveled to Tel Aviv, Israel to attend a conference on the subject of Israel-Hamas War and other middle east concerns. His trip was sponsored by the American Israel Education Foundation (AIEF), an organization affiliated with the American Israel Public Affairs Committee (AIPAC). Flynn was part of an American delegation had been invited to attend. Flynn described his participation as a "fact-finding mission". In May 2024 Flynn filed a resolution in the Boston City Council to "denounce antisemitism" and describe the October 7th, 2023 Hamas-led attack on Israel as terrorism, while opposing a resolution calling for a ceasefire in the Gaza War, characterizing the latter as irrelevant to city affairs.

=== Criticism of conduct of attendees of 2024 South Boston St. Patrick's Day Parade ===
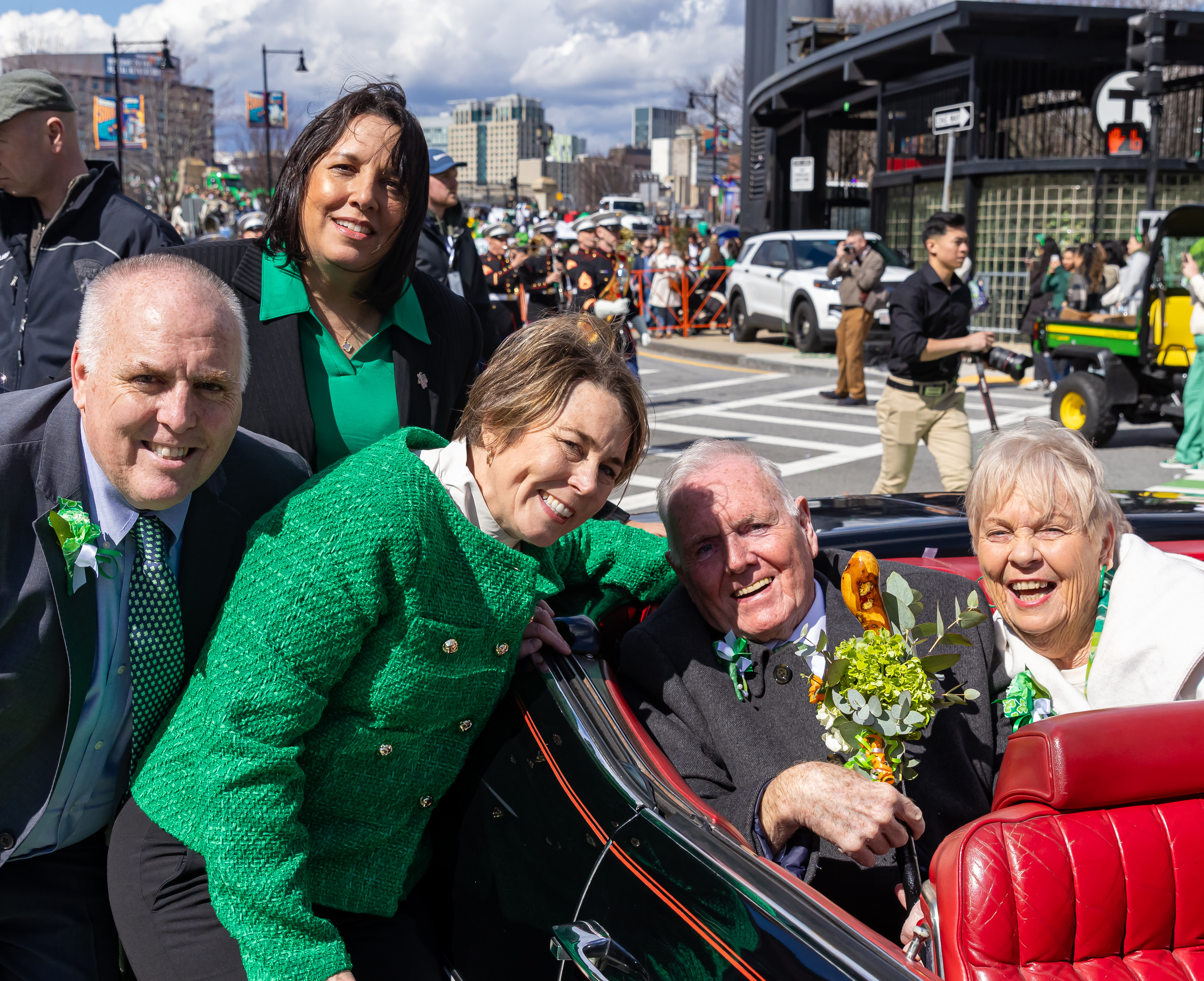
Flynn, Lieutenant Governor Driscoll, and Governor Healey pose with Flynn's father and mother during the 2024 South Boston St. Patrick's Day Parade

In March 2024, Flynn complained of public drunkenness, property damage, and fights by attendees of the South Boston St. Patrick's Day Parade. He proposed as a possible crowd control solution the prospect of having Massachusetts National Guardsmen patrol MBTA stations on the day of the parade. He also floated the possibility that the parade might need to be moved out of the South Boston neighborhood and into Downtown Boston. He remarked, "I don't necessarily want to see the parade move, but I don't want to see this behavior continue, either." The parade has been held in South Boston ever since 1901, when it was moved from Downtown Boston into the neighborhood.

=== Police, health, and public safety matters ===
In January, 2024, Flynn pushed for the city council to allow the city to accept a Federal counter-terrorism grant, pointing to the 2013 Boston Marathon bombing to highlight terrorism concerns. A December 2023 measure to authorize the acceptance of the grant had failed in December 2023. On January 31, 2024, a measure put forward by Flynn to accept the grant was passed by the city council.

In February 2024, Flynn celebrated when American Family Care withdrew from consideration by the Zoning Board of Appeal their application to construct and operate a for-profit urgent care clinic near the location of the existing nonprofit South Boston Community Health Center. Flynn lambasted the Boston Planning & Development Agency for having previously given a positive recommendation on the proposed for-profit clinic.

In early 2024, Flynn revived his efforts to establish a committee dedicated to domestic violence issues. Council President Louijeuene, who had opposed his efforts to do so in the previous council term, again took issue with the necessity for a separate committee to handle matters of domestic violence, arguing that the council's existing Strong Women, Families and Communities Committee had been created with the stated intention of handling such issues.

In August 2024, Flynn introduced a hearing order to the council to investigate staffing concerns in the Boston Police Department. Eight councilors co-sponsored the hearing order. Later that month, he called for all events on the Boston Common be cancelled, alleging that the area was unsafe. Several fellow city councilors criticized Flynn for these remarks, including Council President Loujuene, and City Councilor Henry Santana. The mayoral administration also criticized Flynn's remarks. The day following his initial comment, Flynn asserted his belief that the city had too few police stationed in its downtown, including the Boston Common.

=== Election administration matters ===
In November 2024, Flynn and Murphy proposed a resolution that would have recommended that the city's election department be placed under state receivership. Fellow councilor Tania Fernandes Anderson joined them in sponsoring the resolution (however, she ultimately abstained from the vote). The resolution was defeated, only receiving the votes of Flynn and Murphy in a vote of 2–7 (with four abstentions) The resolution had been proposed in reaction to ballot supply shortages experienced in the city on election day earlier that month. Other councilors expressed concern that such a recommendation would be premature, and argued that before making any such recommendation the council should first engage in due diligence (including an already-scheduled hearing featuring testimony by city election officials).

In May 2025, Flynn voted against advancing a home rule petition that would allow for the city to use instant runoff voting (IRV) ranked choice voting in its municipal elections. Flynn expressed skepticism that the Boston Election Department could currently handle the tabulation of IRV results, and argued, "let’s fix our current voting system." Despite his opposition, the council advanced the petition by a vote of 8–4.

=== Other matters during fourth term ===
In 2024, Flynn endorsed his council colleague Erin Murphy's unsuccessful campaign in the Democratic primary for clerk of the Suffolk Supreme Judicial Court. The election was described as serving as a prominent proxy battle the city's progressive politicians and its city's more conservative "old guard", with many prominent progressives endorsing the victorious Allison Cartwright and many prominent practitioners of more conservative "old-school" Boston politics endorsing Murphy. The election was also described as being was also described as serving as a proxy battle between Mayor Wu's allies and her critics: with Wu and several allies endorsing Cartwright, and several Wu critics endorsing Murphy.

In February 2024, Flynn and Councilor Murphy introduced a resolution urging for the city to expand eligibility for Mayor Wu's pilot program that provides free admission to museums for Boston Public Schools students and their families. The resolution proposed opening up to students who do not attend the city's public schools. Councilor Sharon Durkan had the resolution sent to committee for further consideration, rather than put to an immediate vote, noting that the existing program was still in a pilot phase and arguing that further discussion should be had before voting on the resolution.

In October 2024, Flynn and Councilor Murphy proposed their own alternative to Mayor Wu's initial proposal to adjust commercial property taxes. Later that month, Flynn prevented the council from adding a home rule petition for Wu's new proposal to their meeting agenda. Wu's new proposal had been formed through a compromise between her and business advocacy groups that had opposed her initial proposal. Since the petition was introduced as a late-file matter, unanimous consent was required by councilors in order for it to be added to the meeting agenda. Flynn criticized Wu's negotiations with business advocacy groups to reach a compromise as having lacked public transparency.

In 2025, Flynn opposed the construction of 70 housing units on the lot of a vacant industrial building in the Dorchester Avenue corridor. Flynn criticized that the proposed building, which was in walking distance of Red Line stops and bus lines, did not include any parking. The developer noted that providing at least 14 parking spaces for the building would increase the cost by $75,000 per housing unit.

=== Potential pursuit of higher office ===
In September 2023, when questioned on future pursuit of higher office, Flynn expressed an openness to later running for state or federal office, but expressed a reluctance towards the prospect of running for mayor. Flynn said that a mayoral run would be "very unlikely," remarking that he was, "happy being a city councilor," and quipping, "I think there's one Mayor Flynn in the family, and that was my dad." In late 2023, Flynn also remarked, "I would like to at some point to work at the Veterans Administration." In May 2024, he reiterated that he did not plan to run for mayor. However, later that month he contradicted his earlier statement, saying that he would not rule out a 2025 run for mayor. In September 2024, he stated that he would consider a possible run. In early 2025, Flynn announced that he would not be running for mayor, and would instead seek re-election to his council seat.

== Fifth council term (2026–present) ==
Flynn was re-elected to a sixth term in 2025.

== Political ideology and alignment ==
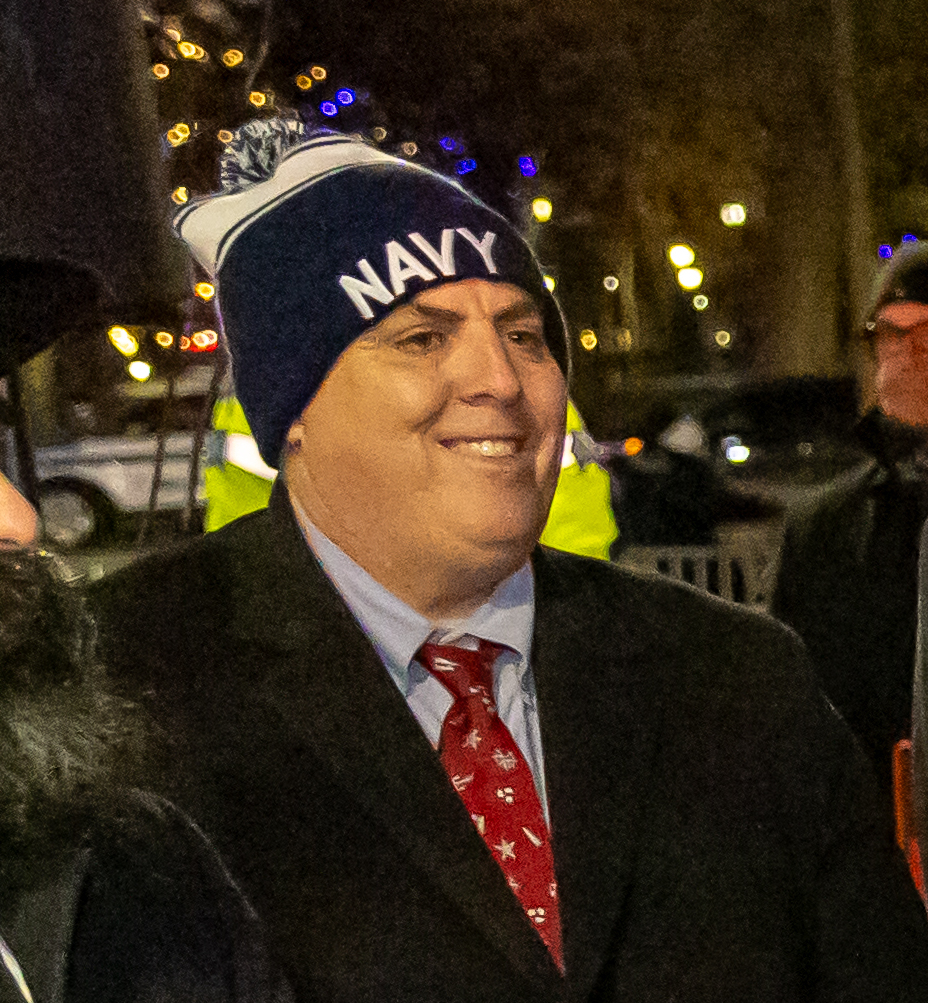
Flynn attends a 2023 event in Boston marking the Jewish holiday of Hanukkah

Flynn is a member of the Democratic Party. He is regarded to be one of the more politically moderate members of the Boston City Council. He has been described as a critic of Mayor Wu, although he has also at times spoken in praise of her. In October 2024, Catherine Carlock and Niki Griswold of The Boston Globe referred to Flynn as being a "sharp critic of Wu". Flynn's politics have additionally been described as conservative-leaning and pro-police.

In March 2022, in advance of the vote for president of the City Council, reporter Danny McDonald wrote a profile on Flynn for The Boston Globe. In the profile, he opined that, "you'd have a hard time crafting a figure more emblematic of Boston's old power structure" than Flynn, noting that Flynn was white, middle aged, Irish Catholic, a Boston native, and a political scion. McDonald noted that these were attributes that had, for a long time, been characteristics of a large share of past Boston City Council members. He opined that this posed an interesting contrast with the reality that the Boston City Council had seen its membership rapidly diversify over the past several elections. McDonald also opined that Flynn's representation of the city's "old power structure" contrasted with the "new power structure" that he believed that Boston had embraced, which he argued had been emblemized by the 2021 election of, "an unabashedly progressive mayor, Michelle Wu, and a historically diverse council that continues to tack to the left." McDonald also characterized Flynn as an individual that generally sought to avoid media attention, preferring that the media instead focus their attention on his City Council colleagues.

== Personal life ==
Flynn and his wife Kristen have two children. He is Irish Catholic. He lives in South Boston. He has sometimes been known as "Eddie" Flynn.

== Electoral history ==
2005 Boston City Council at-large election
Candidates	Primary		General election	
Candidates	Votes	%	Votes	%
Michael F. Flaherty (incumbent)	17,828	13.90	49,220	17.58
Felix D. Arroyo (incumbent)	15,690	12.23	43,533	15.55
Sam Yoon	13,165	10.27	41,891	14.96
Stephen J. Murphy (incumbent)	14,094	10.99	35,553	12.70
John R. Connolly	14,287	11.14	31,629	11.30
Matt O'Malley	12,070	9.41	28,318	10.12
Patricia H. White	12,895	10.05	26,999	9.64
Edward M. Flynn	11,092	8.65	21,778	7.78
Althea Garrison	4,824	3.76		
Kevin R. Mccrea	3,661	2.85		
Roy Owens	3,622	2.82		
Laura Garza	1,807	1.41		
Gregory Joseph O'Connell	1174	0.92		
Martin J. Hogan	1,031	0.80		
Joseph Ready	675	0.53		
Joseph Ureneck	17†	0.01	133†	0.05
Gibran Rivera	17†	0.01		
all others	297	0.23	874	0.31

† write-in votes

2007 Boston City Council 2nd district special election
Candidates	Primary		General election	
Candidates	Votes	%	Votes	%
Bill Linehan	1,834	23.68	4,771	52.58
Susan M. Passoni	1,870	24.14	4,217	46.48
Edward M. Flynn	1,741	22.48	52†	0.57
Robert O'Shea	831	10.73		
Brian R. Mahoney	549	7.09		
Mary Cooney	529	6.83		
Bob Ferrara	384	4.96		
all others	7	0.09	33	0.36
Total	7,745	100	9,073	100

† write-in votes

2017 Boston City Council 2nd district election
Candidate	Primary election		General election	
Candidate	Votes	%	Votes	%
Edward M. Flynn	5,085	56.42	7,474	51.61
Michael S. Kelly	2,860	31.73	6,958	48.05
Corey G. Dinopoulos	504	5.59		
Erica J. Trite	183	2.03		
Joseph F. Kebartas	161	1.79		
Peter A. Lin-Marcus	124	1.38		
Kora R. Vakil	72	0.80		
Write-in	24	0.27	50	0.35
Total	9,013	100	14,482	100

2019 Boston 2nd district City Council election
Candidate	Votes	%
Edward M. Flynn (incumbent)	6,373	97.05
Write-in	194	2.95
Total votes	6,567	100

2021 Boston 2nd district City Council election
Candidate	Votes	%
Edward M. Flynn (incumbent)	15,029	98.32
Write-in	257	1.68
Total votes	15,286	100

2023 Boston 2nd district City Council election
Candidate	Votes	%
Edward M. Flynn (incumbent)	7,575	97.82
Write-in	169	2.18
Total votes	7,744	100
