= Ricardo Arroyo (politician) =

American politician

Member of the Boston City Council from the 5th district
- In office January 1, 2020 – January 1, 2024
- Preceded by: Timothy McCarthy
- Succeeded by: Enrique Pepén

Personal details
- Born: 1987 or 1988 (age 38–39) Boston, Massachusetts, U.S.
- Party: Democratic
- Relatives: Felix D. Arroyo (father); Felix G. Arroyo (brother)
- Education: Massachusetts College of Liberal Arts, Loyola University Chicago Law School
- Website: votearroyo.com

Ricardo N. Arroyo is an American lawyer and politician from the state of Massachusetts. He was previously a member of the Boston City Council.

== Political career ==
Arroyo first ran for a seat on the Boston City Council in 2019; at the time, he was working as a public defender. He successfully won the District 5 (Hyde Park and Roslindale) seat on the council in the November 2019 election, took office in January 2020, and was re-elected in the November 2021 election.

In June 2020, Arroyo (along with Andrea Campbell, Kim Janey, Julia Mejia, and Michelle Wu) was one of five members of the Boston City Council to vote against Mayor Marty Walsh's 2021 operating budget for the city. Arroyo criticized the budget as insufficiently addressing the issue of equity, and pointed out that matters such as fair housing, the city's Disabilities commission, and support services for senior citizens received far less funding than the Boston Police Department.

Arroyo was a prominent backer of an ordinance that would advance a home rule petition to make the Boston School Committee an elected body. The ordinance passed the city council 7–5 on February 15, 2023, but was vetoed two days later by Mayor Michelle Wu who felt it was an inopportune time to change the board structure.

In early February 2022, Arroyo announced his candidacy for the position of district attorney (DA) of Suffolk County (Boston, Chelsea, Revere, and Winthrop), Massachusetts. The position had previously been held by Rachael Rollins, prior to her appointment as United States Attorney for the District of Massachusetts. Kevin Hayden, appointed by Massachusetts governor Charlie Baker as interim DA, declared his candidacy shortly afterwards. Arroyo and Hayden both gained spots on the Democratic ballot in the primary election scheduled for September 6, 2022.

In the course of the election campaign, The Boston Globe reported that police had previously investigated Arroyo for sexual assault reports in two separate instances, in 2005 and 2007. (Neither investigation resulted in charges.) Arroyo lost several key endorsements in the wake of the reports. Following the Democratic primary election held on September 6, and with results showing Hayden with a lead of approximately seven points (53.8% to 46.2%), Arroyo conceded the race via Twitter the following morning.

After the past sexual assault accusations surfaced, City Council President Ed Flynn suspended Arroyo from his City Council Committee Chairmanships. In a September 14, 2022 Council meeting over half of the Council, not including Arroyo, rose to demand he be reinstated to his Chairmanships. Arroyo was formally reinstated to his Chairmanships soon thereafter. In April 2024 Kevin Hayden paid a $5000 fine to the Massachusetts State Ethics Commission who concluded that Hayden improperly used his office to discredit his political opponent – then-Boston city councilor Ricardo Arroyo – who was challenging him in the Democratic primary.

Arroyo and councilors Julia Mejia and Brian Worrell introduced an ordinance to create an Office of Cultural Affairs in the city. While the city council passed the ordinance in October 2023, and was subsequently signed and enacted by Mayor Michelle Wu. The office is situated the city's Equity & Inclusion Cabinet.

In 2023, Arroyo ran for reelection to the Boston City Council and lost in the primary election.

== Controversies ==
=== Sexual assault allegations ===
On August 23, 2022, The Boston Globe published an article regarding two instances of sexual assault reports involving Arroyo that were investigated by police in 2005 and 2007. Arroyo was not charged in either instance, and he denied the allegations reported by the Globe. An attorney, reading a statement at a news conference on behalf of the 2007 complainant, stated that Arroyo never assaulted the client and that the client thought the Globe had twisted her words. Arroyo stated that he was unaware of allegations until being informed by the Globe. He was required to disclose being the subject of any criminal investigation that he may have been aware of when applying for his law license in 2014. The report led to the withdrawal of some endorsements in his run for the Suffolk DA position. The president of the Boston City Council, Ed Flynn, also removed Arroyo from two committee chairmanships and from his position as vice president of the council. On August 30, the Globe published comments from an August 29 interview with the woman who accused Arroyo of assault in 2005—she stood by her accusations of coerced sex by Arroyo. The following day, Arroyo lost the support of senators Elizabeth Warren and Ed Markey and Boston mayor Michelle Wu, as they withdrew their endorsements of him for Suffolk DA. Arroyo pursued the police records in Suffolk Superior Court seeking their release to the public which was partially granted by Judge Squires Lee. Included in the release was an email by the Assistant District Attorney assigned to the case stating, “There was no crime committed,” wrote Assistant District Attorney Tara Burdman in a Feb. 17, 2006, e-mail to an investigator about the allegations made by Arroyo’s high school classmate. In an unredacted version of the e-mail obtained by the Globe, Burdman goes on to say, “There is no indication that [defendant] threatened or was violent towards [victim].” The records also showed that Boston Police had closed the investigation as "unfounded" which the Boston Police Department defines as “investigation revealed that conduct did not occur.”

=== Rachael Rollins Hatch Act violation ===
On May 17, 2023, the US Dept of Justice released the results of two parallel investigations into ethical misconduct by US Attorney Rachael Rollins. During Arroyo's campaign, Rollins had become aware that her federal US Attorney's Office was likely to begin an investigation into criminal allegations against Interim District Attorney Kevin Hayden for his alleged mishandling of a transit police misconduct investigation. Both reports showed that Arroyo and Rollins had communicated about Arroyo's campaign throughout July, August, and September 2022, and that he had sought her guidance as a campaign advisor. Ultimately, Arroyo did not win election to be Suffolk County District Attorney. He conceded the race to his opponent Kevin Hayden on September 6.

Two days after the release of the investigations into her misconduct, Rollins resigned her office on May 19. Arroyo defended his actions in interviews and social media pointing out that the investigations did not allege misconduct by him.

Arroyo received criticism from several colleagues on Boston City Council. Councilor Erin Murphy said he should "consider resigning" after the release of the reports. City Council President Ed Flynn said in a statement "Recent reports and troubling information has once again cast a shadow over the Boston City Council...the residents of Boston deserve better."

=== Ethics violation ===
On June 27, 2023, the Massachusetts State Ethics Commission announced that Ricardo Arroyo in a Disposition Agreement had "admitted to violating the conflict of interest law by continuing to represent his brother [Felix Arroyo] in a civil lawsuit against his brother and the City of Boston after he became a City Councilor." Ricardo Arroyo agreed to pay a $3,000 fine.

According to the Ethics Commission, Ricardo Arroyo had acted as his brother's attorney prior to January 2020. Ricardo Arroyo became a city councilor that January, and continued to serve as attorney for over a year.

=== Bullying allegation ===
In April 2023, a city council attorney filed an internal complaint against Arroyo and fellow councilors Julia Mejia and Kendra Lara accusing all three of bullying and lambasting her during an April meeting. Arroyo's version of events differed “The entirety of this exchange was between myself and Councilor Ed Flynn on the floor, on video, in front of media and the public,” he said in a statement. He said his remarks were directed only at Flynn, and were not discriminatory towards O’Donnell. Because the back-and-forth occurred during a council recess, the cameras were turned off and it was not captured on video. A Boston Globe report from the meeting describes Flynn and Arroyo having a “frosty exchange.” The complaint was leaked to the Boston Herald in August 2023 during the three Councilors' re-election campaigns, leading to the public revelation that due to geotag location data embedded in the photographs of the complaint that were leaked it could be traced to City Council President Ed Flynn's home.

== Personal life ==
Arroyo's father, Felix D. Arroyo, and brother, Felix G. Arroyo, both previously served on the Boston City Council as at-large members.

Political offices
Preceded by Timothy McCarthy	Member of the Boston City Council, District 5 January 2020 – January 2024	Succeeded by Enrique Pepén
