= Rachael Rollins =

American lawyer & politician (born 1971)

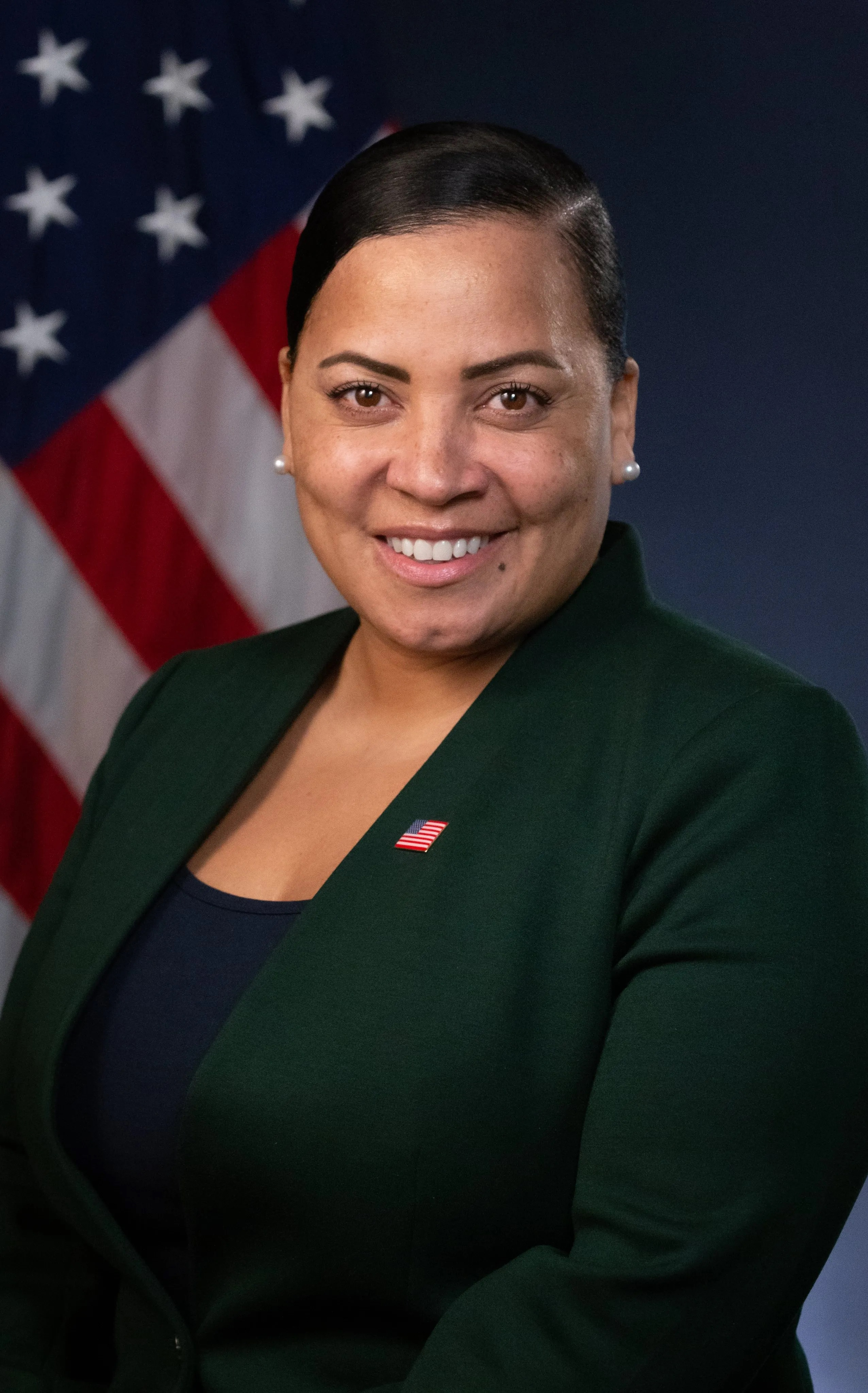
- Official portrait, 2022

United States Attorney for the District of Massachusetts
- In office January 10, 2022 – May 19, 2023
- President: Joe Biden
- Preceded by: Andrew Lelling
- Succeeded by: Joshua S. Levy

District Attorney of Suffolk County
- In office January 2, 2019 – January 10, 2022
- Preceded by: John Pappas
- Succeeded by: Kevin R. Hayden

Personal details
- Born: March 3, 1971 (age 55) Boston, Massachusetts, U.S.
- Party: Democratic
- Education: University of Massachusetts, Amherst (BA); Northeastern University (JD); Georgetown University (LLM)

Rachael Splaine Rollins (born March 3, 1971) is an American lawyer and politician who served as the first African-American woman U.S. attorney for District of Massachusetts from 2022 to her resignation in 2023. Prior to that appointment, she was the district attorney for Suffolk County, Massachusetts, a seat she ran for again in 2026. She is an advocate for criminal justice reform.

In July 2021, President Joe Biden nominated Rollins to be the United States attorney for the District of Massachusetts. She was confirmed by the United States Senate by a 50–50 vote, with Vice President Kamala Harris breaking the tie. Rollins resigned in May 2023, after an investigation revealed multiple ethics violations, including that she had leaked government secrets to influence the election of a political ally.

== Early life and education ==
Rollins was born in Boston and primarily raised in Cambridge, Massachusetts, the oldest of five children. Her father, a second-generation Irish-American, worked as a teacher. Her maternal grandparents are from Barbados and her mother is a first-generation American. Rollins attended Buckingham Browne & Nichols School and earned a Bachelor of Arts degree in education and African-American studies from the University of Massachusetts Amherst, a Juris Doctor from the Northeastern University School of Law, and a Master of Laws in labor and unemployment law from the Georgetown University Law Center.

== Career ==
Rollins began her legal career as a law clerk to Judge Frederick Brown of the Massachusetts Appeals Court from 1997 to 1998. From 1999 to 2002, she was a field attorney for the National Labor Relations Board and from 2002 to 2006, Rollins was an attorney at Bingham McCutchen LLP in their Boston office. Rollins was an assistant United States attorney for the District of Massachusetts from 2007 to 2011. Rollins served as the general counsel to the Massachusetts Department of Transportation from 2011 to 2013 and contemporaneously to the Massachusetts Bay Transportation Authority from 2012 to 2013. She was chief legal counsel to the Massachusetts Port Authority from 2013 to 2015.

=== District attorney ===
==== Election ====
During her campaign, Rollins pledged to decriminalize certain offenses, such as shoplifting, drug possession, wanton or malicious destruction of property, drug possession with intent to distribute, driving with a suspended or revoked driver's license, and resisting arrest. She defeated four other candidates in the September 4, 2018, Democratic primary and won the November 6, 2018, general election with 80% of the vote against independent challenger Michael P. Maloney. She took office on January 2, 2019.

==== Tenure ====
Rollins succeeded John P. Pappas, who was appointed by Governor Charlie Baker to serve as Suffolk County district attorney from September 26, 2018, completing the final months of Daniel F. Conley's 16-year term.

In March 2019, Rollins laid out a memorandum on resolving petty crimes without jail time. In her capacity as district attorney, she required prosecutors to visit jails. Rollins endorsed New York City councilwoman Tiffany Cabán in the Democratic primary for Queens County District Attorney.

A study by economists at Rutgers University, Texas A&M University, and New York University found that Rollins's policy change whereby nonviolent misdemeanor offenses would not be prosecuted did not lead to an increase in crime rates and that it reduced the likelihood that nonviolent misdemeanor offenders would be arrested in the future.

==== Cash bail ====
After campaigning on a platform that included reducing the use of cash bail, Rollins has since critiqued the Massachusetts Bail Fund for securing the release of incarcerated people charged with violent felonies from pretrial detention. After a person bailed out by the Massachusetts Bail Fund allegedly committed another sexual assault following their release, Rollins became embroiled in a debate over the nature of cash bail, with critics arguing that bail should not be used to keep individuals incarcerated who cannot pay, and community safety should be ensured through other methods. Rollins faced further criticism when her office successfully secured an increase in the bail of a homeless man who was charged with armed robbery when learning he would be bailed out by the fund.

=== U.S. attorney for the District of Massachusetts ===
==== Nomination and confirmation ====
In July 2021, President Joe Biden nominated Rollins to be the United States attorney for the District of Massachusetts. Republican U.S. Senator Tom Cotton said he would try to prevent Rollins from being confirmed, saying she supported policies that have contributed to an increase in violent crime. Senator Ted Cruz also criticized her for stating she would not prosecute certain crimes, such as trespassing, breaking and entering, larceny, resisting arrest, wanton or malicious destruction of property, drug possession with intent to distribute, driving with a suspended or revoked license, and several more. In September 2021, a committee vote to advance Rollins' nomination was delayed after Cotton wanted more time to convince colleagues to oppose her.

On September 30, 2021, her nomination was stalled in committee by an 11–11 vote. On December 8, 2021, Vice President Kamala Harris cast a tie-breaking vote on the Senate's motion to invoke cloture on, as well as to confirm, Rollins's nomination. After her confirmation, the United States Marshals Service refused Rollins' request for a full time security detail, assessing that she was at a low risk of actual harm after receiving death threats via email. On January 10, 2022, she was sworn in as the United States attorney for the District of Massachusetts.

=== Ethics probe and resignation ===
In November 2022, the inspector general of the United States Department of Justice (DOJ) opened a wide-ranging ethics probe into Rollins' appearance at a Democratic National Committee political fundraiser with First Lady Jill Biden, her travel, and use of her personal cellphone.

The inspector general's 161-page report alleged a broad array of misconduct by Rollins. It accused her of disclosing to a journalist nonpublic information about a possible Justice Department investigation, soliciting and accepting 30 free tickets to a Boston Celtics game and accepting thousands of dollars from a sports and entertainment agency for flights and a stay at a luxury resort. According to the report, Rollins tried to influence the outcome of the race to succeed her as Suffolk County District Attorney by "repeatedly attempt[ing] to sabotage" the campaign of the rival (Kevin Hayden) of her favored candidate (Ricardo Arroyo). The report also found that she had lied under oath to investigators.

Another federal watchdog agency, the U.S. Office of Special Counsel (OSC), found in its own investigative report that on multiple occasions Rollins violated the Hatch Act, a law that limits political activity by government workers. In a letter to President Joe Biden, Special Counsel Henry Kerner described Rollins' violations as among the "most egregious transgressions" of the law that the agency has ever investigated: "In particular, her repeated efforts to leak non-public DOJ information for the purpose of harming a political candidate rank among the most flagrant violations of the Hatch Act that OSC has ever investigated," the report states. "The leak was an extraordinary breach of public trust by a senior government official, which threatens to erode confidence in the integrity of federal law enforcement actions."

Rollins resigned on May 19, 2023, preventing the federal government from disciplining her.

=== Post-resignation ===
In February 2024, Rollins was suspended from practicing law in Massachusetts for nonpayment of registration fees. She regained her law license in April.

As of March 2024, Rollins was working as the special projects administrator at Roxbury Community College, reportedly tasked with leading a program for formerly incarcerated people. She was still in that role as of November 2025.

In April 2026, Rollins obtained nomination papers for the position of Suffolk County District Attorney, for the Democratic primary election in September 2026 — a three-way contest between Rollins, incumbent Kevin Hayden, and former assistant district attorney Linda Champion. Rollins lost in the primary, coming in third place.
