= Kevin Hayden =

American politician

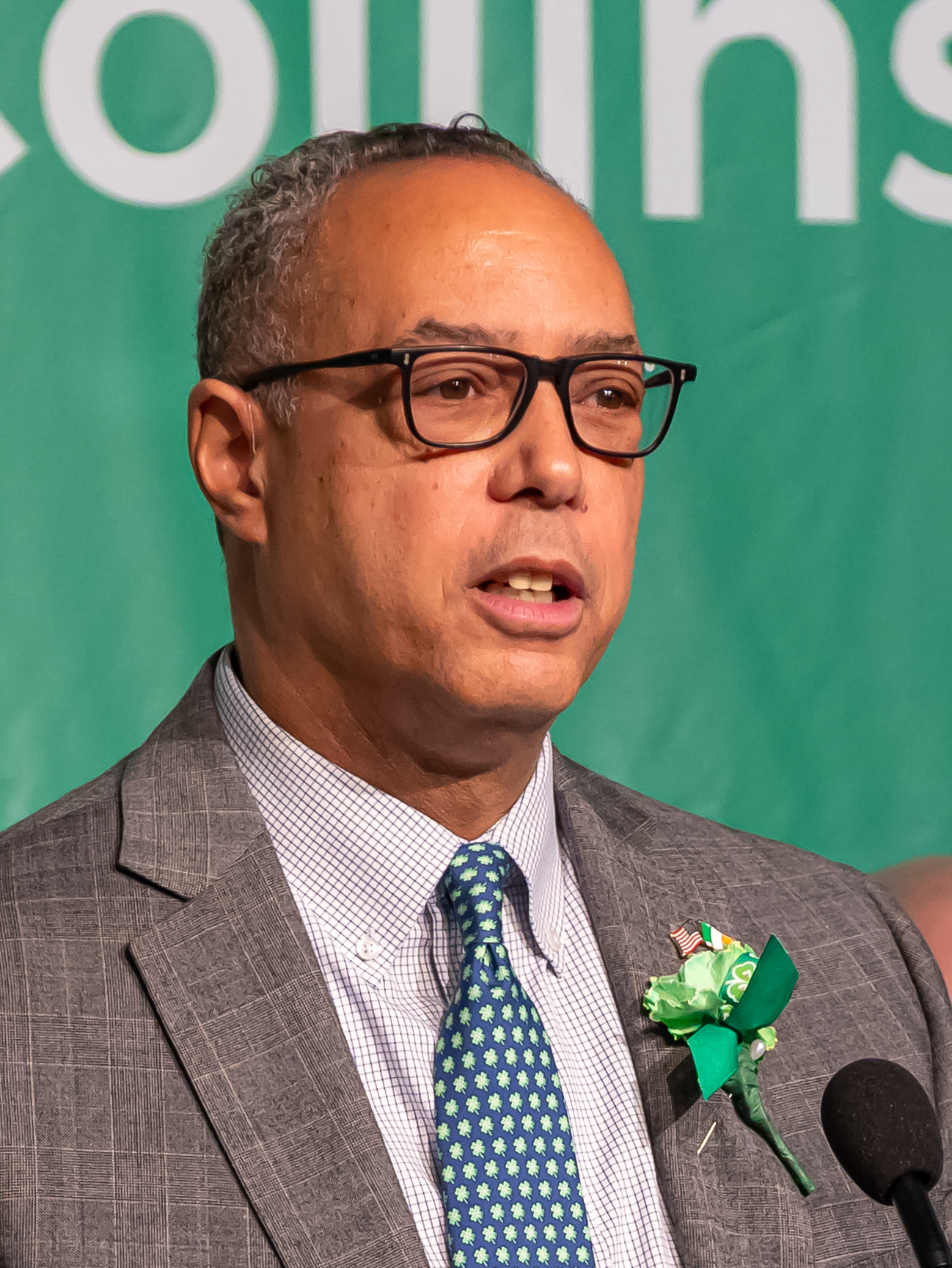
- Hayden in 2025

District Attorney of Suffolk County
- Incumbent
- Assumed office January 10, 2022
- Preceded by: Rachael Rollins

Personal details
- Born: 1967 or 1968 (age 58–59) Newton, Massachusetts, U.S.
- Party: Democratic
- Education: Dartmouth College (BA); Boston University (JD)

Kevin R. Hayden (born c. 1968) is an American lawyer currently serving as District Attorney for Suffolk County, Massachusetts. Hayden was appointed by Gov. Charlie Baker in January 2022, and was later elected to a full term in November 2022 after winning the Democratic primary and the general election.

== Early life and education ==
Hayden grew up in Newton, Massachusetts, and spent time in the Roxbury neighborhood of Boston when his father, NAACP official Bob Hayden Jr., moved there following his parents’ divorce. His mother, Charlene Roberts Hayden, was a notable computer scientist and Black Catholic ministries director in the Archdiocese of Boston. Hayden was raised Catholic.

Hayden played high school lacrosse at Noble and Greenough School and went to Dartmouth College where he majored in English. He worked in finance before going to law school at Boston University.

== Career ==
Hayden served as an assistant district attorney in the Suffolk County District Attorney's office from 1997 to 2008. In 2015, Governor of Massachusetts Charlie Baker appointed Hayden as chairman of the Massachusetts Sex Offender Registry board.

=== Suffolk County District Attorney ===
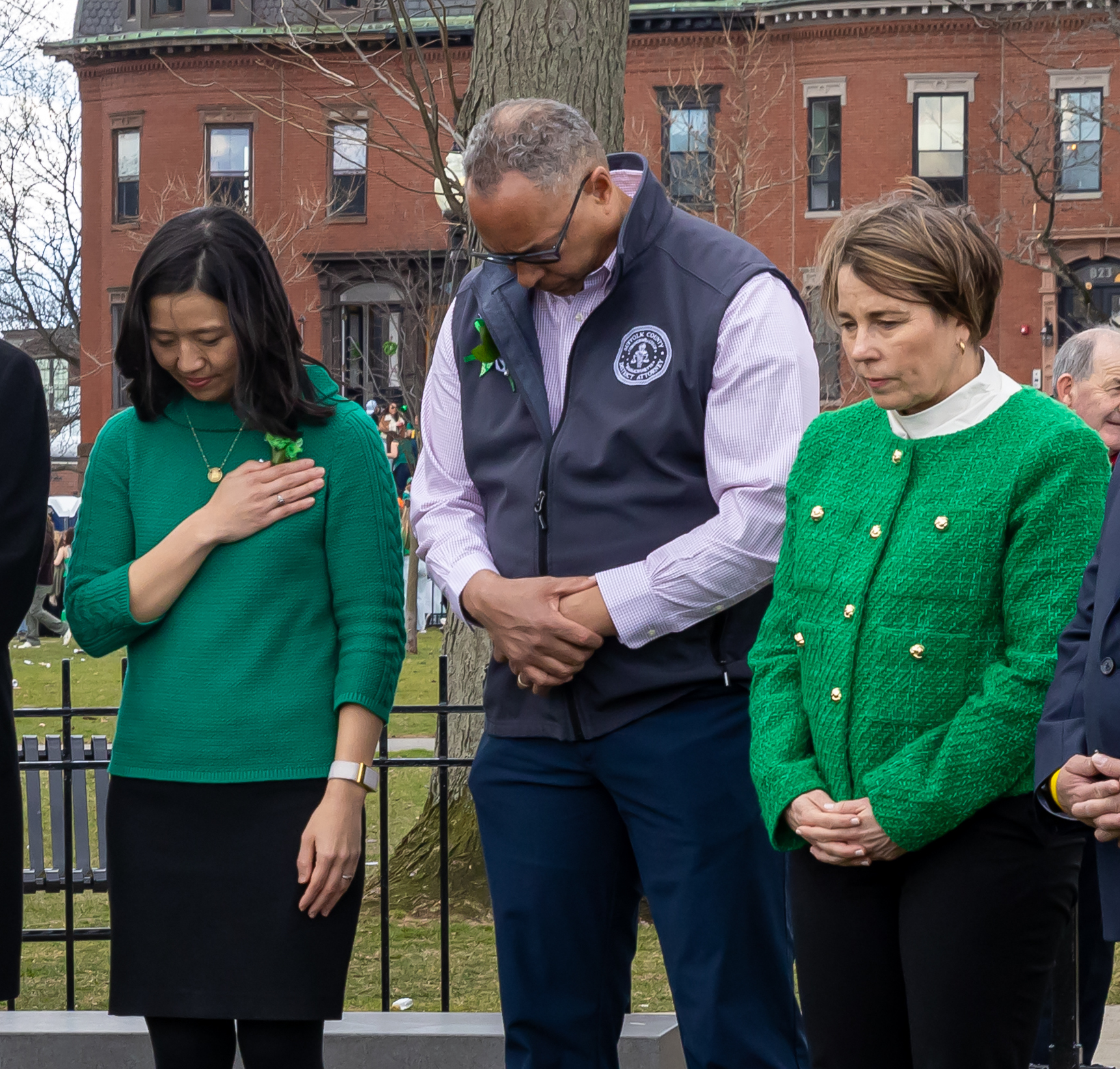
Hayden (center) joins Boston Mayor Michelle Wu (left) and Massachusetts Governor Maura Healey in visiting the South Boston Vietnam Veterans Memorial on Saint Patrick's Day 2024

In January 2022, Governor Baker appointed Hayden to replace Rachael Rollins as Suffolk County District Attorney when Rollins became U.S. Attorney for Massachusetts. As interim district attorney, Hayden increased the number of prosecutors assigned to the civil rights and hate crime unit due to an increase in high-visibility white-supremacist activity in the Boston area.

==== 2022 Primary Election ====
When appointed, it was unclear if Hayden planned to seek a full term in the position. He subsequently declared his candidacy in February 2022 as a Democratic candidate, running against Boston City Council member Ricardo Arroyo. Hayden describes himself as a liberal prosecutor though during the election he was typically cast as more centrist than Arroyo. Hayden received endorsements from elected officials including State Senator Will Brownsberger and Boston City Councilors Frank Baker and Erin Murphy.

The campaign was marked by controversy, especially after The Boston Globe received records of two investigations of Arroyo for committing sexual assault when he was teenager. Arroyo denied even knowing the investigations were opened and accused Hayden of using the power of his office to release the records which Hayden denied. The District Attorney's office released a statement denying releasing the information noting that though Arroyo was not charged with a crime that the allegations may still have been true. In April of 2024 Hayden was found responsible for committing a state ethics violation by the Massachusetts State Ethics Commission who concluded that Hayden improperly used his office to discredit his political opponent and fined him $5000.

In August 2022, a Boston City Council debate about removing Arroyo from chairing the Government Operations and Redistricting committees was characterized as being between those aligned behind Hayden and those aligned behind Arroyo. Following the debate, during a council recess an Arroyo supporter was assaulted in Boston City Hall by a Hayden supporter.

Following the Democratic primary election held on September 6, and with results showing Hayden with a lead of approximately seven points (53.8% to 46.2%), Arroyo conceded the race via Twitter the following morning.

==== 2026 Primary Election ====
In the early months of 2026, Kevin Hayden began collecting necessary signatures to appear on the ballot for Suffolk County District Attorney. Months later, on July 6th, 2026, Hayden made his first public announcement on Facebook that he was planning on running for another term as Suffolk County DA in the 2026 election. Hayden joined former Suffolk County DA Rachel Rollins and Linda Champion, all of whom would compete for the Democratic nomination on September 1st, 2026.

During the primary election, Hayden secured endorsements from Boston Mayor Michelle Wu, who endorsed him during his first run for DA, as well as The Boston Globe Editorial Board. Wu cited Hayden's "experience, integrity, and study leadership" as reasons for her endorsement.

On September 1st, 2026, Hayden won the Suffolk County DA Democratic nomination after beating Rachel Rollins and Linda Champion with approximately 50% of the vote. The Associated Press called the race at 11:52pm. No Republican ran to unseat the Democratic nominee.

== Controversies ==
During his tenure as chair, a state audit of the MA Sex Offender Registry Board determined that 1,769 people on the registry had not kept up with reporting requirements and 936 were not properly categorized.

=== Alleged Transit Police Cover Ups ===
Hayden was accused of corruption and covering up police misconduct after being appointed Suffolk County DA during investigations in 2022. In April 2021, Transit Police officer Jacob Green threatened motorist Jason Lenor with a gun while off duty and not in uniform. Green proceeded to cover up the incident with support from colleague Kevin Davis. Investigation of the harassment began under District Attorney Rollins but was not yet concluded by the time Hayden was appointed to the role. Despite strong evidence of misconduct, Hayden's assistant DA Kevin Mullen indicated to attorneys for both Green and Davis that they would not be proceeding to prosecute the case. Following Mullen's first indication the case would not proceed, Green's lawyer Robert Griffin made a donation of $100 to Hayden's election campaign and Green himself made a donation of $125. Griffin claims Hayden personally called him to solicit a donation. Hayden's office declined to comment on the investigation. Following the story, Hayden faced calls to resign from Boston politicians and apparent criticism via the Twitter account of the Transit Police. U.S. Attorney Rollins' office was recused from any potential investigations into these allegations.

Later in 2022 Hayden's office dropped charges against another former Transit Police officer accused of covering up the beating an unhoused man in 2018 after asserting new evidence changed the nature of the case and despite Transit Police expressing disappointment at the decision to not prosecute. In August of 2023 that same officer was charged by the US Attorney's Office for his actions in the case Hayden had dropped. Interim US Attorney Joshua Levy stated, "For the good of the community and all the honorable officers and supervisors in the police ranks, misconduct of this nature cannot be tolerated," leading to questions regarding Hayden's decision to drop the charges.

=== Boston Police Officer Manslaughter Charge ===
At approximately 9:43pm on March 11, 2026, Boston Police Officer Nicholas O'Malley shot and killed an alleged carjacking suspect in Boston's Roxbury neighborhood. At a press conference the same day, Police Commissioner Michael Cox stated the officers had approached the suspect in the vehicle on foot while giving verbal commands, which were not followed. To flee the interaction, the suspect accelerated the vehicle, at which point Boston Police officers discharged their weapons, killing 39 year-old Stephenson King.

On March 20th, 2026, Officer O'Malley was formally charged with manslaughter in connection to the shooting, with Hayden claiming the use of force unjustified, per his investigation. It was the first Boston police officer arrest in over 30 years. Hayden explained "at no time in his attempt to flee did Mr King drive at the officers nor were either officer in the back of Mr. King’s vehicle when Officer O’Malley open fired”. O'Malley had stated that the suspect had accelerated the vehicle while turning the steering wheel in an attempt to run over the officers.

Amid conflicting stories, Hayden's office rejected calls for the body camera footage to be made public.

== Electoral history ==
2022 Suffolk County District Attorney Democratic primary
Party	Candidate	Votes	%
Democratic	Kevin Hayden (incumbent)	41,399	53.5
Democratic	Ricardo Arroyo	35,339	45.6
Write-in	Other	678	0.9
Total votes		77,416	100
