= Ruthzee Louijeune =

American politician (born 1987)

- Louijeune in 2025

President of the Boston City Council
- In office January 1, 2024 – January 5, 2026
- Preceded by: Ed Flynn
- Succeeded by: Liz Breadon

Member of the Boston City Council from at-large district
- Incumbent
- Assumed office January 1, 2022
- Preceded by: Annissa Essaibi George

Personal details
- Born: 1987 (age 38–39) Boston, Massachusetts, U.S.
- Party: Democratic
- Education: Columbia University (BA); Harvard University (MPP, JD)

Ruthzee Louijeune (born 1987) is an American politician and lawyer serving as an at-large member of the Boston City Council. She has been an at-large member of the Boston City Council since January 2022, and has served as the council's president from January 2024 until January 2026. She is the first Haitian-American to serve on the council.

== Early life and education ==
Louijeune is the daughter of immigrants to the United States from Haiti.

She was raised in the Hyde Park and Mattapan neighborhoods of Boston. She attended Charles H. Taylor Elementary School, and graduated from Boston Latin School in 2004. During high school, she interned in the office of State Representative Marie St. Fleur as part of the Ward Fellowship Program.

Louijeune moved to New York City in order to attended Columbia University, where she graduated with a bachelor's degree in 2008. After earning her undergraduate degree, she moved to Cambridge, Massachusetts, where she attended Harvard Kennedy School and Harvard Law School, earning a master's degree in public policy and a Juris Doctor in 2014. At Harvard Law School, she was a student attorney at the Harvard Legal Aid Bureau.

== Legal career and other activities ==
Louijeune worked as an attorney for Perkins Coie. Louijeune also served as senior counsel for Elizabeth Warren's 2020 presidential campaign. During the 2018 elections, Louijeuene worked in the state of Maine as an election lawyer. In 2021, Sean Philip Cotter of the Boston Herald described Louijeune as being a protégé of Warren.

Loujuene founded Opening PLLC, a legal and advocacy firm. The firm conducts consulting and works on affordable homeownership agreements in Boston.

Louijeune has been involved as a volunteer with the Massachusetts Affordable Housing Alliance, representing low-income individuals in the housing court. In her work with them, she has fought against eviction and to promote homeownership. She has worked with them in their efforts to increase homeownership opportunities in Boston for first-generation home buyers. She is considered to be a housing advocate.

During the COVID-19 pandemic, Loujeune volunteered with Guild Works to deliver food to food insecure and financially struggling residents of the Dorchester neighborhood.

== Boston City Council ==
Louijeuene has served on the Boston City Council since early 2022. She is regarded to be a progressive member of the Democratic Party.

=== First term ===
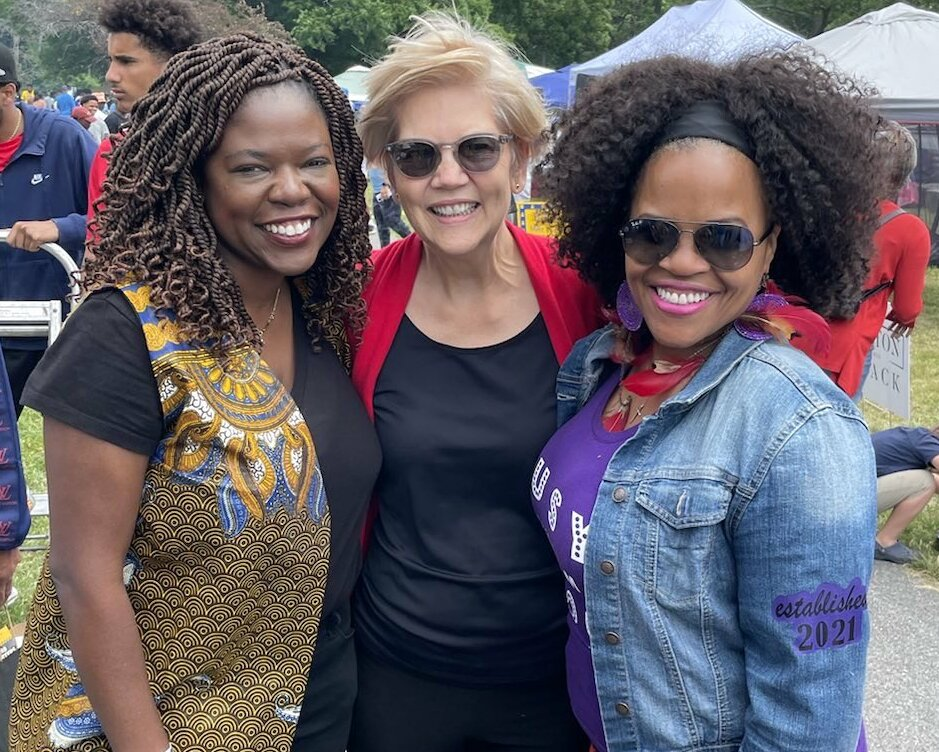
L–R: Congresswoman Louijeune, Senator Elizabeth Warren, and former acting mayor Kim Janey at a 2022 Juneteenth event

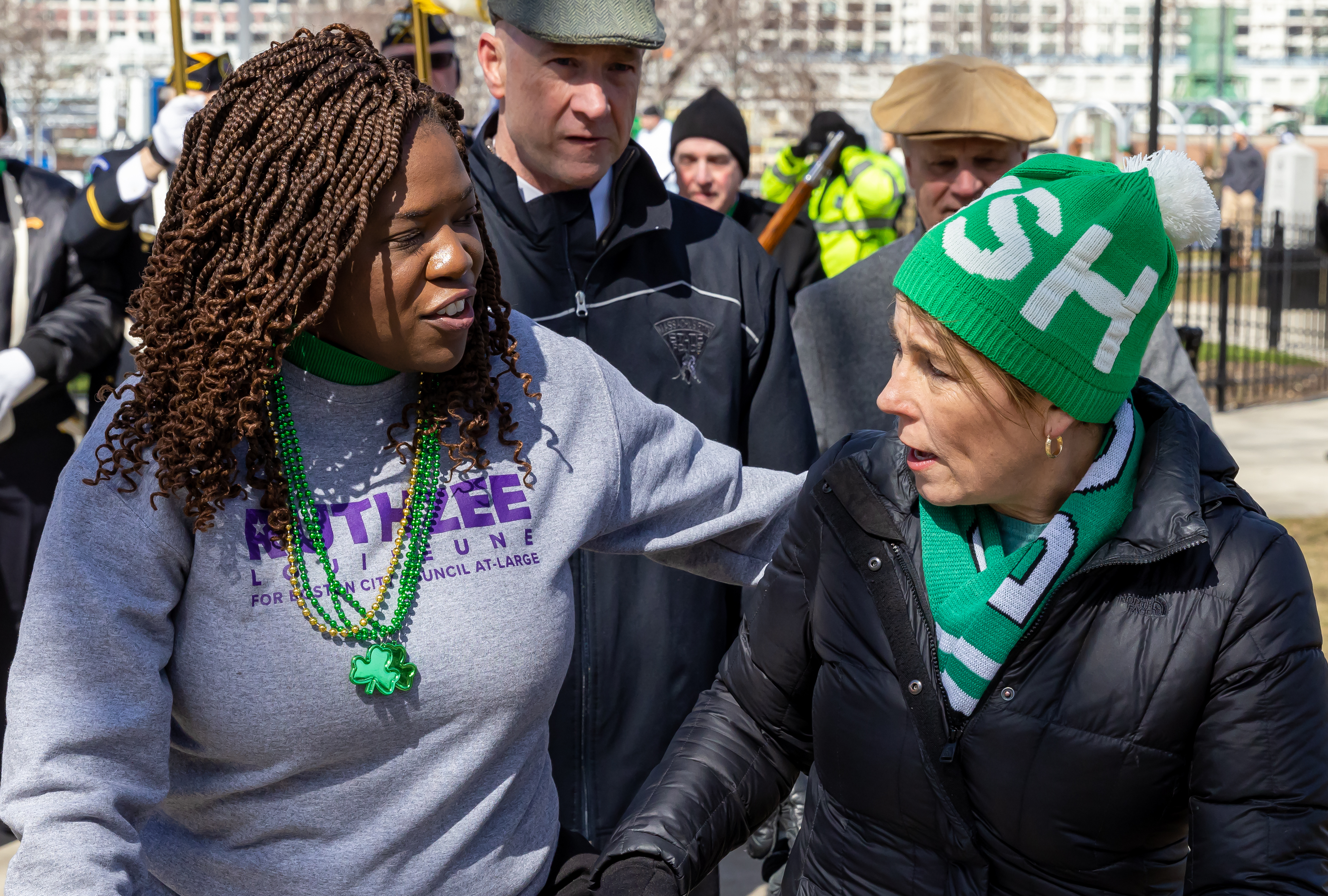
Louijeune (left) with Governor Maura Healey during the 2023 South Boston St. Patrick's Day Parade

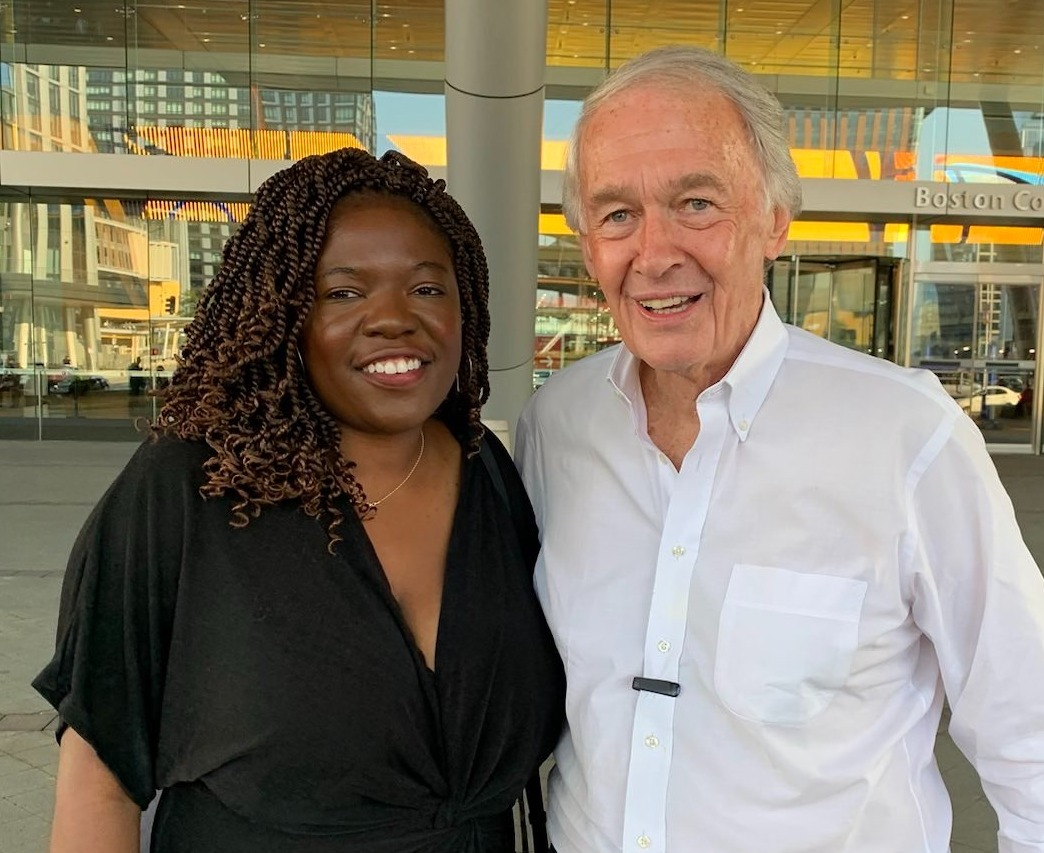
Louijeune with Senator Ed Markey

Louijeune was elected to Boston City Council in November 2021. As a first-time candidate Louijeune had a strong showing in the 2021 election, finishing third in the at-large race behind incumbent council members Michael F. Flaherty and Julia Mejia. She is the first Haitian-American to serve on the council. Her election the city council was regarded as demonstrating their growing clout in the area's politics. According to U.S. Census Bureau data, Greater Boston is home to the third-largest Haitian diaspora population in the United States. She took office in January 2022.

In her first term, Louijeuene served as chair of the Civil Rights Committee and vice-chair of the Housing and Community Development Committee

In June 2022, the Boston City Council unanimously adopted a resolution introduced by Louijeune and Councilors Tania Fernandes Anderson and Kendra Lara which apologized for the city's historical role in the Atlantic slave trade.

In late 2022, Louijeune proposed an amendment to have the city regulate beekeeping. In late 2022, Louijeune played a key role in the passage of a 20% pay increase for members of the Boston Council, which was vetoed by Mayor Michelle Wu. Wu supported an 11% increase, which had been the recommendation of Boston’s compensation advisory board, but opposed a 20% increase.

Louijeune and her City Council colleague Kendra Lara authored a resolution that was passed by the Boston City Council in late 2022 which urged Mayor Michelle Wu to raise the affordable housing unit requirements for new residential developments from 13% to 20% and to lower the threshold for which the requirements apply from buildings with nine or more units to buildings with five or more. The resolution also urged Wu to transition from utilizing HUD-designated area median income and to instead determine base affordability based upon the average income of a neighborhood.

In late 2022, Louijeune gave her support to the idea of permitting immigrants who have legal immigration status to cast votes in elections for city offices. More than 28% of Boston's city population are immigrants with legal immigration status. Fifteen other cities in the United States had already adopted similar measures. In December 2023, Louijeune voted to give City Council approval to a home rule petition that, if signed by the mayor, approved by the state legislature, and signed by the governor, would have granted such voting rights in local elections.

In April 2023, the council unanimously adopted a resolution introduced by Louijeuene and Liz Breadon expressing support for an effort by residents and fellows at Mass General Brigham to form a trade union.

After a judicial ruling required the city to adopt a new City Council district map to be used in the 2023 Boston City Council election, Ed Flynn, as president of the Boston City Council, tasked Louijeune with heading the process of drawing such a map in her capacity as the chair of the Civil Rights Committee. Flynn had assigned this task to Louijeune in order to avoid having Liz Breadon (as head of the Redistricting Committee) oversee it. The adoption of a new map needed to be completed on an accelerated timeline in order to avoid a delay to the municipal elections. Over the course of two weeks in which five lengthy hearings were held, a map was agreed upon by the Civil Rights Committee. In late-May, the resulting map was adopted by the full council in a 10–2 vote and signed into law by Mayor Wu. Louijeune's leadership in resolving the contentious redistricting matter raised her profile in the city's politics and won her praise. Emma Platoff of The Boston Globe called the passage of a new map, "a feat many feared would come too late if it happened at all," managing to adopt a new map in quick enough time to hold municipal elections on schedule.

In August 2023, Boston Herald political columnist Joe Battenfeld characterized Louijeune as having quickly become a "rising star" on the city council. He wrote that she had become, "a fast-moving leader of the body in less than two years." Other Boston political commentators had similarly called her a "rising star" on the council.

=== Second term and council presidency ===
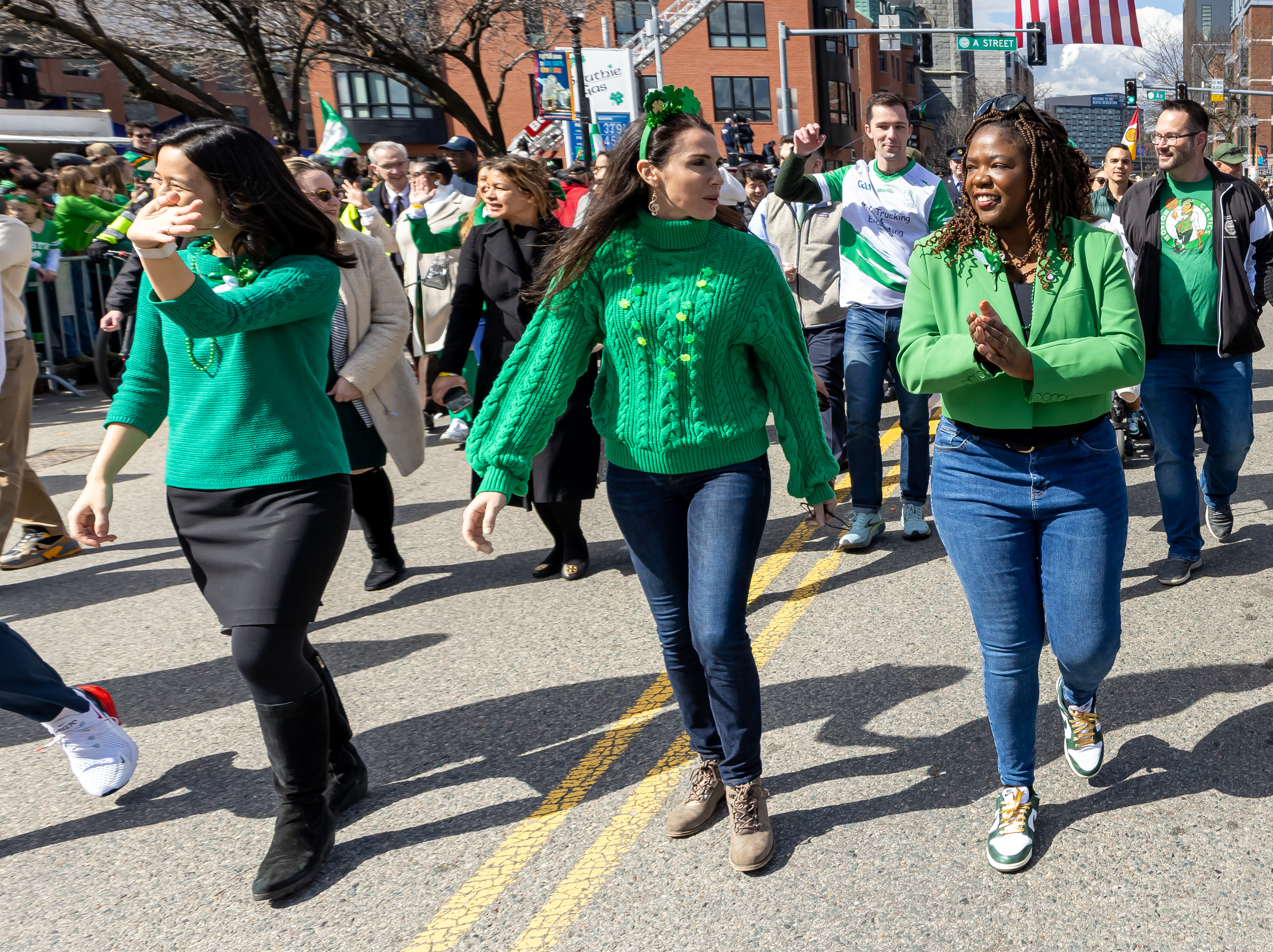
Louijeune (right) walks alongside Mayor Wu and State Auditor Diana DiZoglio during the 2024 South Boston St. Patrick's Day Parade

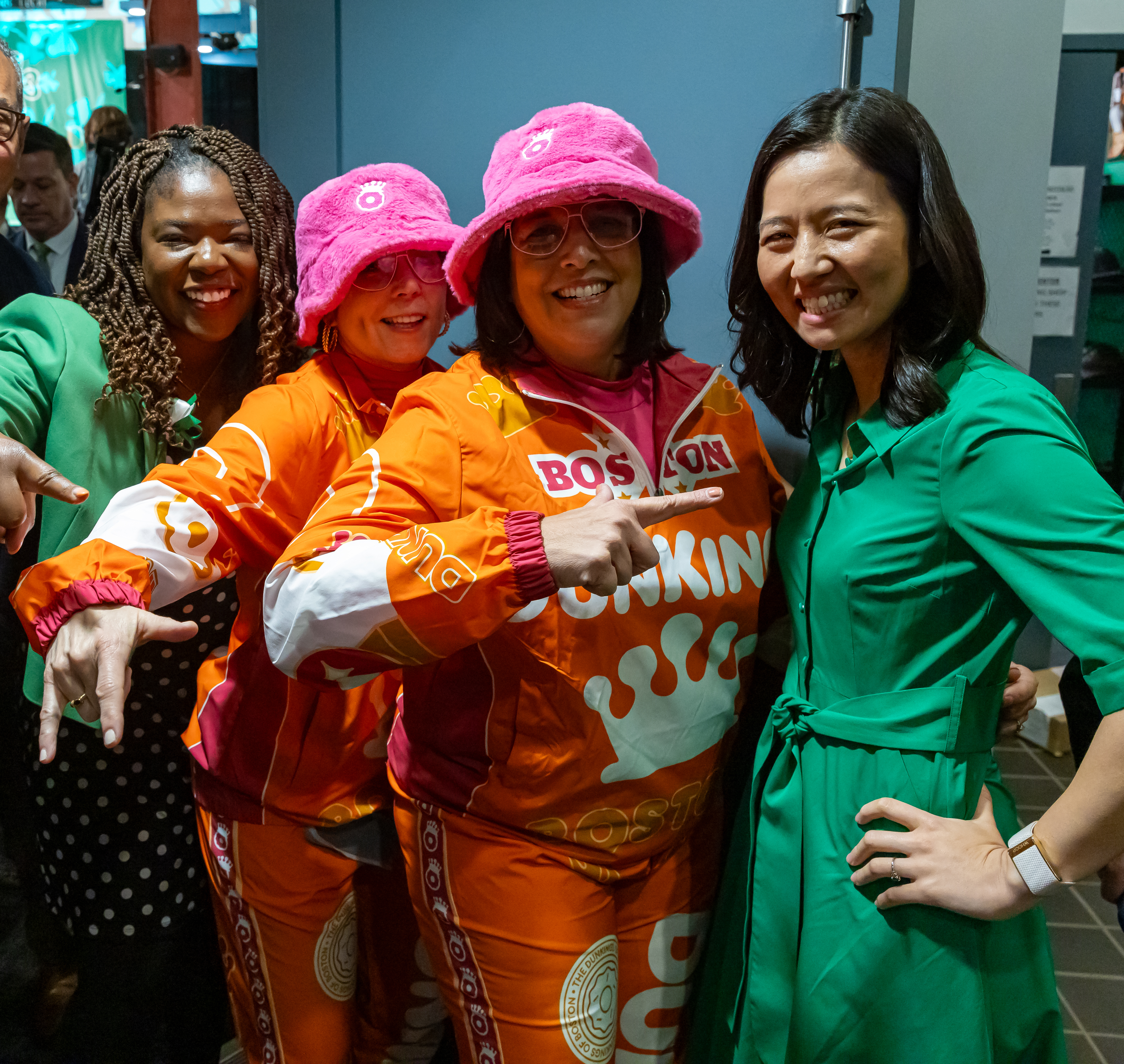
While attending the 2024 South Boston St. Patrick's Day Breakfast, Louijeune poses for a photograph with Governor Maura Healey and Lieutenant Governor Kim Driscoll (both dressed in costumes for a Dunkin'-related skit) and Mayor Michelle Wu

Louijeune received the most votes in the at-large race of the 2023 Boston City Council election, being re-elected to a second term. Two days after the election, Louijeune claimed that she believed she had secured enough support from fellow individuals elected to the incoming city council to be elected the council's next president. On January 1, 2024, after the new council was sworn-in, it voted unanimously to elect her as its president.

Bill Forry of the Dorchester Reporter observed of Louijeune’s path to being elected council president,

Louijeune didn’t just win the most votes [in the November 2022 at-large city council election,] she backed the right candidates in the election, made smart alliances with existing colleagues, lined up her votes, and locked them in publicly. She deftly and quickly filled the void, shutting down the dithering that critics often point to as a negative trait of city government. That skillset bodes well for keeping councillors focused on the stack of pressing matters that we elected them to attend to.

Forry also noted that Louijeune's election as council president marked a notable moment for Boston’s Haitian diaspora community, and found it to be “poignant” that the vote coincided with Haitian Independence Day.

Louijeune joins Congresswoman Pressley outside of the United States Capitol during a House Haiti Caucus event in September 2024

Loujuene served as a delegate to the 2024 Democratic National Convention. Several weeks before the convention, incumbent president Joe Biden (the party's presumptive presidential nominee) withdrew his his candidacy for re-election and endorsed vice president Kamala Harris to instead be the party's presidential nominee. Shortly after this, Loujuene indicated her support for Harris's presidential candidacy and intention to support her at the convention. After Republican presidential nominee Donald Trump began spreading the Springfield pet-eating hoax (a false conspiracy theory about a Haitian immigrant community in Springfield, Ohio) in September, Louijeune condemned Trump and participated in a protest decrying Trump's rhetoric, and also participated in a House Haiti Caucus event outside of the United States Capitol.

In early 2025, Louijeuene was lead sponsor of a home rule petition seeking approval for Boston to adopt an instant runoff voting (IRV) system of ranked choice voting. The petition was co-sponsored by councilors Julia Mejia and Henry Santana. In mid-May, the council voted 8–4 to approve the petition, advancing it to the mayor's desk. Wu indicated her intent to sign off on advancing the measure further, after which it will still need to state government passage and approval by Boston voters in a public referendum in order to be enacted.

In 2024, Boston magazine called Louijeuene "Boston's brightest rising political star", and ranked her at #75 on its 2024 list of the "Most Influential Bostonians".

=== Third term ===
In the 2025 Boston City Council election, Louijeuene was re-elected to a third term. She again placed first among at-large candidates, receiving the most votes.

== Personal life ==
Louijeune lives in Boston's Hyde Park neighborhood. In addition to English, Louijeuene is fluent in French and Haitian Creole. She also has conversational fluency in Spanish.

== Electoral history ==
2021 Boston City Council at-large election
Candidate	Primary election		General election	
Candidate	Votes	%	Votes	%
Michael F. Flaherty (incumbent)	41,299	15.0	62,242	17.4
Julia Mejia (incumbent)	38,765	14.1	61,709	17.3
Ruthzee Louijeune	33,425	12.2	54,601	15.3
Erin Murphy	22,835	8.3	42,831	12.0
David Halbert	16,921	6.2	42,561	11.9
Carla Monteiro	18,844	6.9	39,648	11.1
Bridget Nee-Walsh	15,118	5.5	27,424	7.7
Althea Garrison	16,810	6.1	24,194	7.0
Kelly Bates	12,735	4.6		
Alexander Gray	11,263	4.1		
Jon Spillane	11,155	4.1		
Said Abdikarim	7,725	2.8		
Domingos DaRosa	7,139	2.6		
Donnie Palmer Jr.	6,823	2.5		
Roy Owens Sr.	5,223	1.9		
James Colimon	4,671	1.7		
Nick Vance	3,943	1.4		
Write-ins	845	0.3	1,350	0.4
Total	274,694	100	359,294	100

2023 Boston at-large City Council election
Candidate	Votes	%
Ruthzee Louijeune (incumbent)	44,641	20.29
Erin Murphy (incumbent)	43,548	19.80
Julia Mejia (incumbent)	39,187	18.10
Henry Santana	34,151	15.53
Bridget Nee-Walsh	26,775	12.17
Shawn Nelson	10,512	4.78
Clifton A. Braithwaite	10,299	4.68
Catherine Vitale	8,560	3.89
Juwan Skeens write-in	113	0.05
all others	1,549	0.70
Total votes	219,965	100

2025 Boston at-large City Council election
Candidates	Preliminary election		General election	
Candidates	Votes	%	Votes	%
Ruthzee Louijeune (i)	45,500	18.7	54,885	19.2
Julia M. Mejia (i)	42,245	17.4	47,770	16.7
Erin J. Murphy (i)	38,981	16.0	46,709	16.4
Henry A. Santana (i)	30,670	12.6	44,206	15.5
Frank K. Baker	26,240	10.8	28,526	10.0
Alexandra E. Valdez	18,930	7.8	23,468	8.2
Marvin Mathelier	13,826	5.7	21,101	7.4
Will Onuoha	11,216	4.6	17,540	6.2
Yves Mary Jean	7,419	3.0		
Rachel Miselman	7,134	2.9		
Write-in	988	0.4		
Total	243,149	100	285,375	100
Turnout	93,168		96,405	
