= 1657 Roemera =

Main-belt asteroid

Discovery
- Discovered by: P. Wild
- Discovery site: Zimmerwald Obs.
- Discovery date: 6 March 1961

Designations
- Named after: Elizabeth Roemer (American astronomer)
- Alternative designations: 1961 EA · 1932 AB
- Minor planet category: main-belt · (inner); Phocaea

Orbital characteristics
- Epoch 4 September 2017 (JD 2458000.5)
- Uncertainty parameter 0
- Observation arc: 84.79 yr (30,971 days)
- Aphelion: 2.9032 AU
- Perihelion: 1.7946 AU
- Semi-major axis: 2.3489 AU
- Eccentricity: 0.2360
- Orbital period (sidereal): 3.60 yr (1,315 days)
- Mean anomaly: 253.33°
- Inclination: 23.372°
- Longitude of ascending node: 105.32°
- Argument of perihelion: 54.409°

Physical characteristics
- Dimensions: 7.665±0.219 km 8.04 km (calculated)
- Synodic rotation period: 4.5±1 h 34.0±0.1 h
- Geometric albedo: 0.20 (assumed); 0.220±0.030
- Spectral type: Tholen = S · S
- Absolute magnitude (H): 12.84 · 12.89±0.16

1657 Roemera, provisional designation 1961 EA, is a stony Phocaea asteroid from the inner regions of the asteroid belt, approximately 8 kilometers in diameter. It was discovered on 6 March 1961, by Swiss astronomer Paul Wild at Zimmerwald Observatory near Bern, Switzerland, and later named after American astronomer Elizabeth Roemer.

== Orbit and classification ==
Roemera is a member of the Phocaea family (701), a large family of stony asteroids with nearly two thousand known members. It orbits the Sun in the inner main-belt at a distance of 1.8–2.9 AU once every 3 years and 7 months (1,315 days). Its orbit has an eccentricity of 0.24 and an inclination of 23° with respect to the ecliptic. Roemera was first identified as 1932 AB at Heidelberg Observatory in 1932, extending the body's observation arc by 29 years prior to its official discovery observation at Zimmerwald.

== Physical characteristics ==
In the Tholen classification, Roemera is a stony S-type asteroid.

=== Lightcurves ===
In May 2008, American astronomer Brian Warner obtained a rotational lightcurve of Roemera from photometric observations at his Palmer Divide Observatory in Colorado. It gave a longer than average rotation period of 34.0 hours with a brightness variation of 0.15 magnitude (U=2). Polish astronomer Wiesław Z. Wiśniewski found a different period solution of 4.5 hours with a low amplitude of 0.09 magnitude in March 1990 (U=2).

=== Diameter and albedo ===
According to the survey carried out by NASA's Wide-field Infrared Survey Explorer with its subsequent NEOWISE mission, Roemera measures 7.66 kilometers in diameter and its surface has an albedo of 0.220, while the Collaborative Asteroid Lightcurve Link assumes a standard albedo for stony asteroids of 0.20 and calculates a diameter of 8.04 kilometers with an absolute magnitude of 12.89.

== Naming ==
This minor planet was named by the discoverer in honor American astronomer Elizabeth Roemer (1929–2016), U.S. Naval Observatory, in appreciation of her untiring and successful efforts to advance the knowledge of the motions and physical properties of comets and minor planets. Roemer herself discovered the asteroids 1930 Lucifer and 1983 Bok. The official naming citation was published by the Minor Planet Center on 1 February 1965 (M.P.C. 2347).
