= Joan Toland Bok =

American energy executive and lawyer

- Born: Joan Toland
- Occupations: Energy executive and lawyer
- Spouse: John F. Bok (m. 1955; died 2014)
- Children: 2
- Relatives: Kenzie Bok (granddaughter); Bart Bok (father-in-law); Priscilla Fairfield Bok (mother-in-law)

Joan Toland Bok (née Toland) is an American energy executive and lawyer who served as the chairwoman of New England Electric System between 1984 and 1998. She was the first woman to lead a large American energy company. She also served as director of the Avery Dennison Corporation.

Bok served on numerous public and nonprofit boards, serving as the president of the Harvard Board of Overseers and as a trustee of the Boston Athenaeum, National Osteoporosis Foundation, Vermont Historical Society, Woods Hole Oceanographic Institution, and the Worcester Foundation for Biomedical Research. In 1993, she was elected a member of the American Academy of Arts and Sciences. In the 1960s, Bok and her husband John F. Bok (deceased, 2014) heavily involved themselves in neighborhood-level civic matters in Beacon Hill neighborhood of Boston, where they resided.

== Early life and education ==
Joan Toland grew up in Grand Rapids, Michigan. Both of her parents were high school math teachers. Bok graduated with honors from Radcliffe College. When she was seventeen, her father died.

Joan Toland attended Harvard Law School. She was one of very few female students at the institution. While at Harvard Law, she met classmate John F. Bok, who she competed against in moot court. She married Bok in 1955, shortly their graduation from law school. The Boks took the Massachusetts bar examination at the same time, becoming the first married couple to pass it at the same time.

== Legal and business career ==
Bok and her husband both began their careers working as lawyers at Ropes & Gray. She practiced corporate law. Bok departed the law firm in 1959, following the birth of her first son. She started her own part-time private practice. Bok gave birth to a second son two years after her first.

In 1968 Bok began working as a staff lawyer at New England Electric System. She worked her way up, and in 1973 joined the ranks of the company's management. During the 1970s energy crisis, Bok divised an approach that focused on conservation and load management to increase the number of consumers without massive price increases. In 1979, amid the 1979 oil crisis, Bok helped develop a plan under which the company decreased its reliance on oil for energy production from 78% to 24%. By 1984, as an executive, Bok was a highest-ranking woman in the energy industry. She was also one of the highest-salaried women in the industry, having earned $220,000 the previous year. Bok's work received high praise from her colleagues and from industry experts, and on July 1, 1984, she assumed the position of chairwoman of the company. She was the first woman to lead a large American energy company. Under Bok's leadership, the company was credited with long delivering its service with low electric rates for consumers while still increasing its stock price. In the 1980s, the company began weaning itself away from investing in nuclear power, which was retrospectively credited as allowing the company to avoid financial losses that other companies incurred in such investments. The company was early in pulling out of the project to construct a second unit at the Seabrook Station Nuclear Power Plant. Bok retired as chairwoman in April 1998.

Bok also served as director of the Avery Dennison Corporation.

== Civic and nonprofit work ==
Bok served on numerous public and nonprofit boards. Bok served as the president of the Harvard Board of Overseers. She also served as a trustee of the Boston Athenaeum, National Osteoporosis Foundation, Vermont Historical Society, Woods Hole Oceanographic Institution, and the Worcester Foundation for Biomedical Research. In 1993, she was elected a member of the American Academy of Arts and Sciences.

Bok her husband both involved themselves in neighborhood matters the Beacon Hill neighborhood of Boston, where they resided. In the 1960s, aiming to attract more young families to choose to move into the neighborhood of Boston rather than fleeing to the suburbs, the Boks partnered with several neighbors to purchase three of the neighborhoods many rooming houses and convert them into single-family residences that were then sold to young families. The Boks were opposed to the neighborhood being overrun by office space conversions of existing properties, which they were concerned would transform the residential characteristic of the area into more of a business district. The Boks utilized their legal knowledge of zoning to block conversions of residential properties into offices. She took up the issue of furnace air pollution in the neighborhood and worked to persuade neighborhood residents to comply with new standards and replace coal furnaces with gas ones.

== Personal life ==
Bok married Harvard Law classmate John F. Bok in 1955, shortly after both of them graduated Harvard Law. Her husband was the son of famed astronomers Bart Bok and Priscilla Fairfield Bok. Bok and her husband took the Massachusetts bar exam, and became the first married couple to pass it at the same time. Beginning in the mid-1950s, the Boks resided together in the Beacon Hill neighborhood of Boston. They had two sons together, Alexander Toland Bok and Geoffrey Robins Bok. The Boks are the grandparents of Kenzie Bok, former Boston City Council member and current head of the Boston Housing Authority.

Bok's husband died in 2014.

== See also ==
- United States energy law
