= Kenzie Bok =

American politician

- Bok in 2021

Administrator of the Boston Housing Authority
- Incumbent
- Assumed office 2023
- Appointed by: Michelle Wu
- Preceded by: Kate Bennett

Member of the Boston City Council from the 8th district
- In office January 6, 2020 – April 28, 2023
- Preceded by: Josh Zakim
- Succeeded by: Sharon Durkan

Personal details
- Born: Priscilla MacKenzie Bok; June 30, 1989 (age 37) Boston, Massachusetts, U.S.
- Relatives: John F. Bok (grandfather); Joan Toland Bok (grandmother); Bart Bok (great-grandfather); Priscilla Fairfield Bok (great-grandmother)

Education
- Education: Harvard University (AB, History); University of Cambridge (M.Phil, 2012; PhD, 2016)

Philosophical work
- Era: 20th-century philosophy
- Region: Western philosophy
- School: Analytic; Social liberalism
- Institutions: Harvard University
- Main interests: Political philosophy; Justice; Politics; Social contract theory; housing
- Notable ideas: Affordable housing is a social and economic justice issue

Priscilla MacKenzie "Kenzie" Bok (born June 30, 1989) is an American politician and historian who has been the administrator of the Boston Housing Authority since 2023. She previously served as a member of the Boston City Council, representing District 8, which includes Back Bay, Beacon Hill, Fenway–Kenmore, Mission Hill, and the West End. She is also a lecturer on Social Studies at Harvard University, where she teaches intellectual history and history of philosophy. Bok was elected to the City Council in the November 2019 election. In 2023, Mayor Michelle Wu appointed Bok to become the head of the Boston Housing Authority.

== Early life ==
Bok was born in Boston on June 30, 1989 and grew up in the Bay Village neighborhood. Before her admission to Harvard in 2007, she had been educated at the John Winthrop School in Boston, the Park School, and Milton Academy (2007).

Bok's family had been involved in the Ward 5 Democratic Committee going back two generations. Bok is the granddaughter of lawyer and civic activist John F. Bok and his wife, energy executive and lawyer Joan Toland Bok. She is the great-granddaughter of astronomers Bart Bok and Priscilla Fairfield Bok.

== Academic career ==
Bok served as student president of the Kennedy Institute of Politics while she was a Harvard undergraduate, where in 2011 she earned her B.A. summa cum laude in intellectual history. In 2010, she was awarded a Marshall Scholarship, then continued studies at the University of Cambridge (St John's College), where she earned her M.Phil. in Political Thought & Intellectual History in 2012 and then her Ph.D. in History in 2016. While at Cambridge, she was awarded for her academic work the St John's Benefactors Scholarship, the Quentin Skinner Prize, the Sara Norton Prize, and the Thirwall Medal and Prince Consort Prize.

Bok is an intellectual historian who specializes in the young John Rawls and his path to writing A Theory of Justice. As a Harvard University lecturer on social policy and intellectual history, she also teaches a course on "Justice in Housing." She has published peer-reviewed articles on the philosopher John Rawls in Modern Intellectual History and the Journal of the History of Ideas.

== Political and government career ==
Bok interned for the Barack Obama 2008 presidential campaign at its Chicago headquarters, then, following the election, was an intern in 2010 at the White House. She later served as budget director for At-Large Boston City Councilor Annissa Essaibi George and as senior advisor for policy and planning at the Boston Housing Authority (BHA). Bok has long been an advocate in support of affordable housing. As a policy advisor at the BHA, (the city agency focused on the management, preservation, and creation of affordable housing), she led the successful effort to make an immensely impactful alteration to the manner in which the agency valued Section 8 housing vouchers. This moved the agency away from valuing the vouchers at a flat rate for every neighborhood in the Boston metropolitan area without factoring in market prices of different areas to varying those rates. BHA data demonstrated in late 2022 that this change allowed more voucher recipients to move into more expensive neighborhoods, which are considered "high-opportunity" areas. This is expected to help integrate the city in regards to race and income.

=== Boston City Council ===
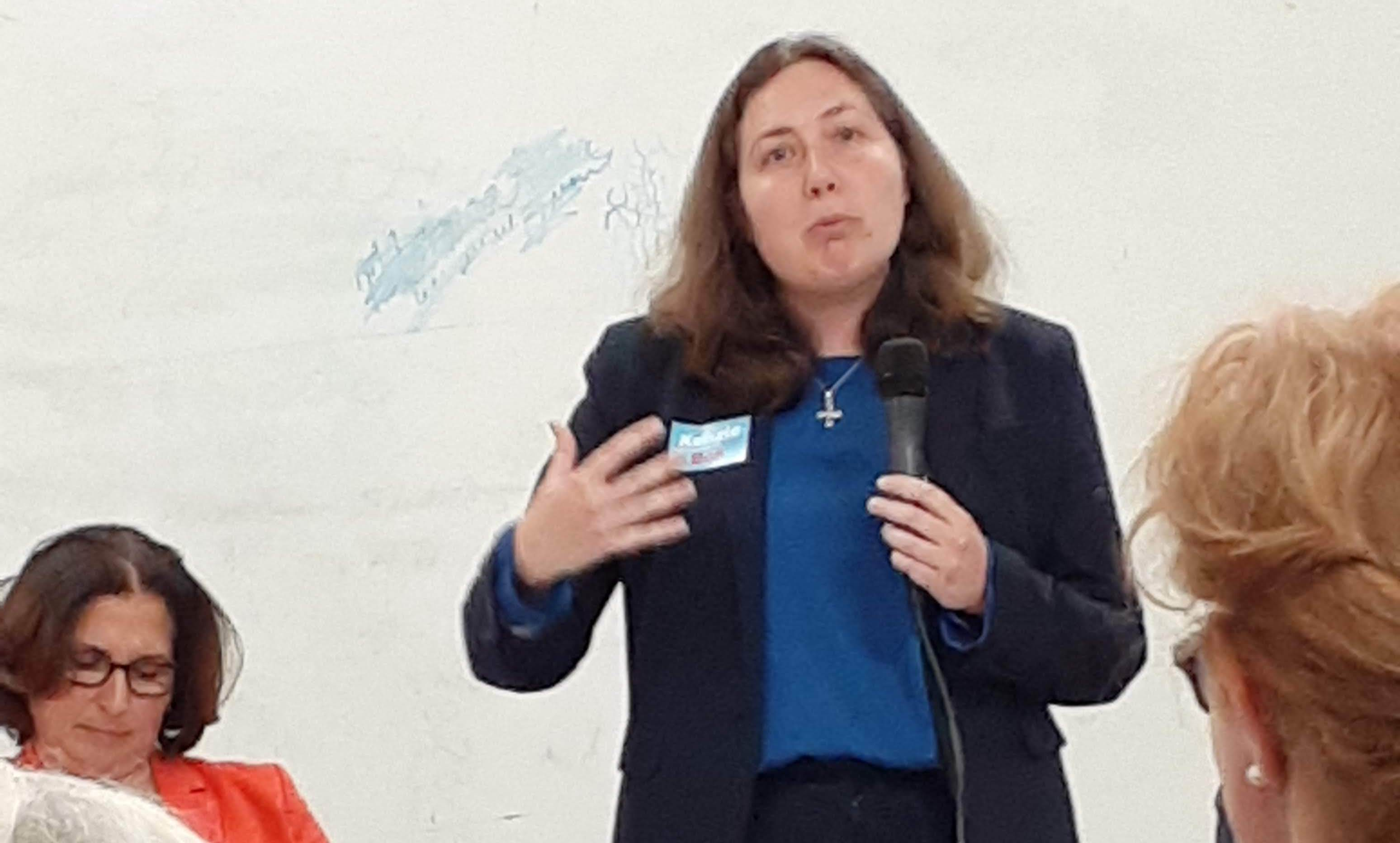
Bok at a 2019 city council candidate forum

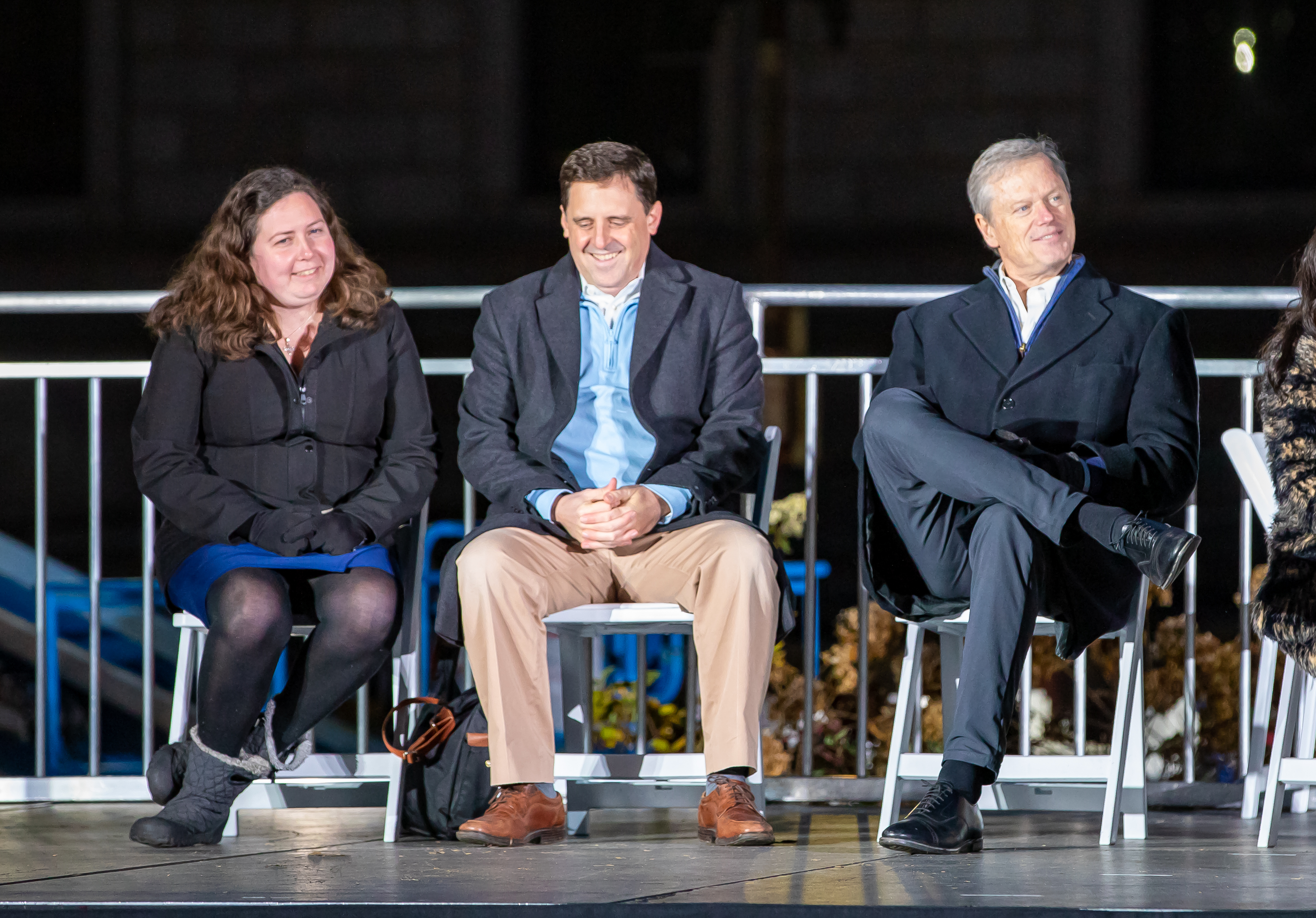
Bok with State Rep. Jay Livingstone, and Gov. Charlie Baker in 2021

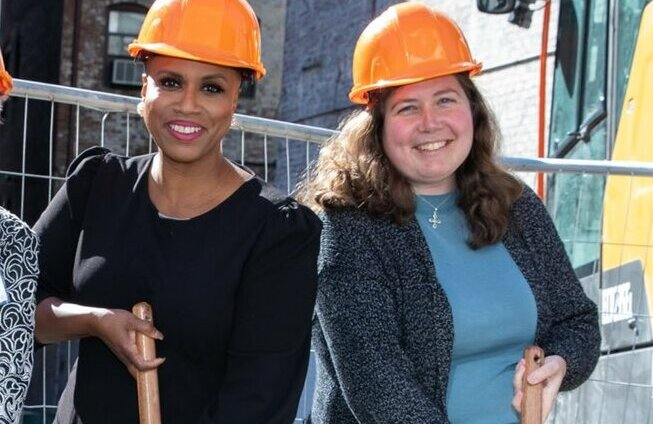
Bok (right) with Congresswoman Ayanna Pressley at the 2022 groundbreaking of the Fenway CDC Terrace housing project

Bok declared her candidacy for the Boston City Council in April 2019 following the decision of Josh Zakim to not seek a third term as councillor for District 8. PBS Boston affiliate WGBH described Bok as an "affordable housing expert and community leader" and as "senior adviser for policy and planning at the Boston Housing Authority and the former chair of Boston's Ward 5 Democratic Committee." At Harvard, where she is both a summa cum laude graduate and a lecturer, she teaches a course in "Justice and Housing" and serves on the board member at the Massachusetts Affordable Housing Alliance. Before the preliminary election, Bok was endorsed by The Boston Globe, U.S. Congresswoman Ayanna Pressley, and numerous local organizations and politicians.

In the September 2019 preliminary election, Bok received the largest percentage of votes for district 8 (50%), followed by Jennifer Nassour, former head of the Massachusetts Republican Party. In the November 2019 general election, Bok won the seat with 70% of the vote, and took office on January 6, 2020.

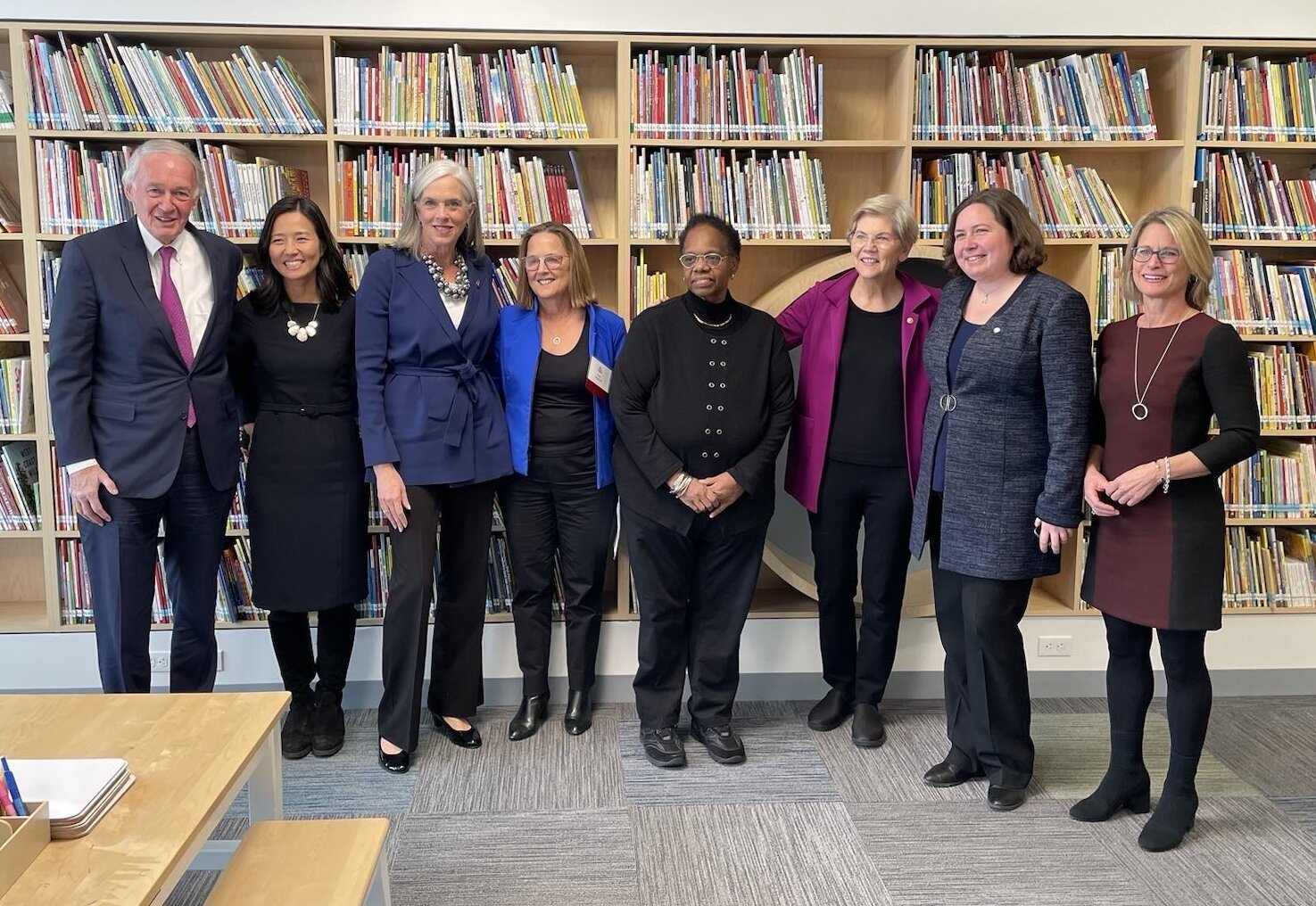
Bok (second from right) poses in November 2022 with a group that includes U.S. Senator Ed Markey, Boston Mayor Michelle Wu, U.S. Congresswoman Katherine Clark, and U.S. Senator Elizabeth Warren

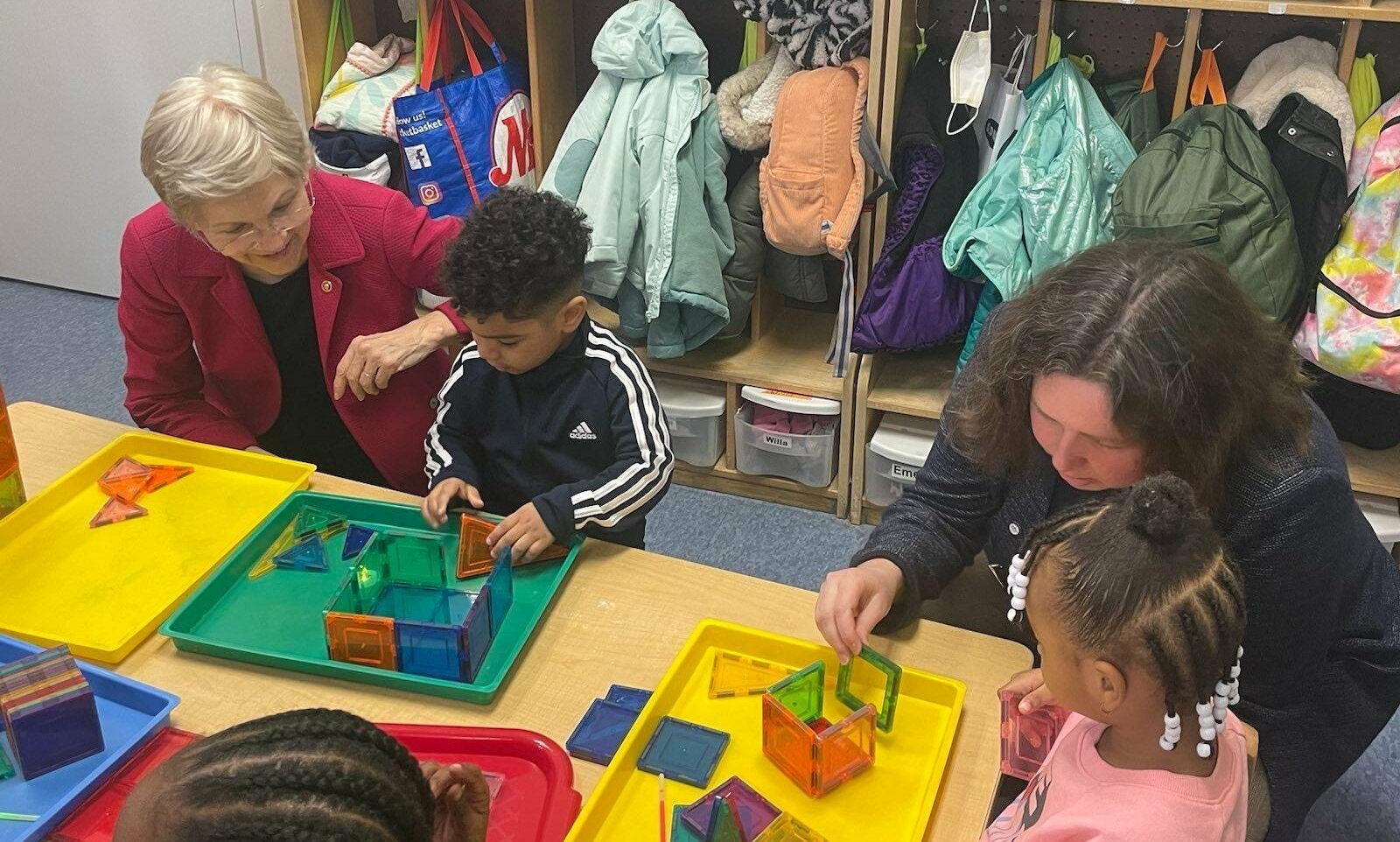
U.S. Senator Elizabeth Warren (left) and Bok visiting a childcare center in the Mission Hill neighborhood in April 2023

Bok led the council's budget processes during part of her tenure on the Boston City Council. She was also the leading figure in addressing the council's input in the city's distribution of funding from the American Rescue Plan Act. In 2023, Emma Platoff of The Boston Globe described Bok as, "one of the council's foremost policy wonks and procedural experts – and often one of [Mayor] Wu's best council allies."

Bok is believed to have attempted to secure support to be elected by her fellow councilors as the council's president for the session of the council that began in 2022. However, she was unsuccessful and Ed Flynn was instead elected.

=== Administrator of the Boston Housing Authority ===
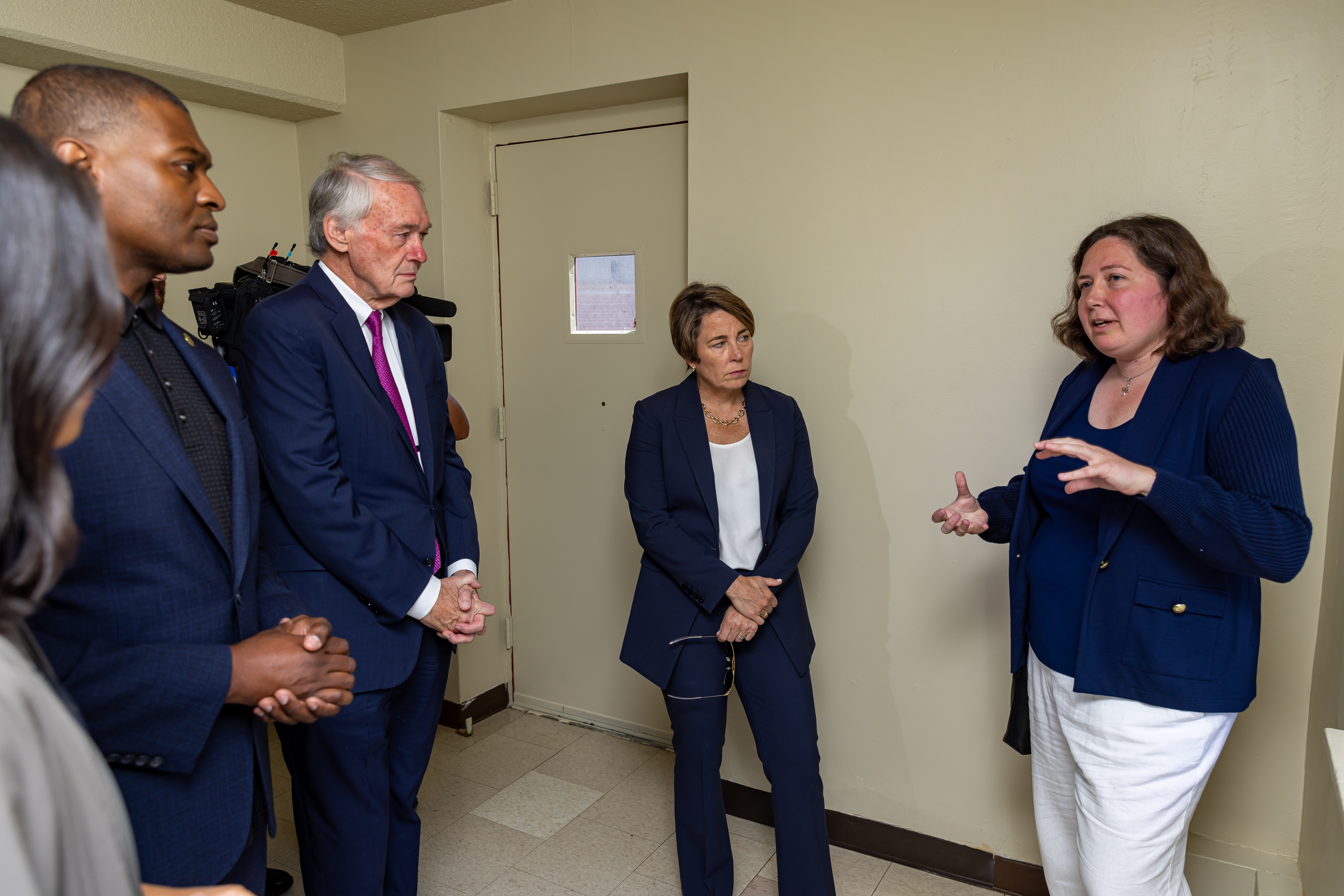
Bok (right) speaks to Mayor Wu, EPA Administrator Michael S. Regan, U.S. Senator Ed Markey, and Governor Maura Healey in August 2023

In April 2023, Mayor Michelle Wu appointed Bok to serve as administrator of the Boston Housing Authority. She left the City Council to serve. On April 5, 2023, Bok offered her letter of resignation to the Boston City Council effective April 28. Bok began her transition into the office in May 2023 with plans to take office sometime in the summer of 2023 after her predecessor, Kate Bennett, departed. She is among the youngest individuals to ever head the agency.

== Personal life ==
Bok is a longtime member and vestry member at Trinity Church in Boston's Copley Square.

== Electoral history ==
2019 Boston City Council 8th district election
Candidate	Primary election		General election	
Candidate	Votes	%	Votes	%
Priscilla Kenzie Bok	2,035	50.38	3,666	70.11
Jennifer Ann Nassour	740	18.32	1,540	29.45
Helene Vincent	589	14.58		
Kristen Mobilia	512	12.68		
Montez David Haywood	149	3.69		
Write-in	14	0.35	23	0.44
Total	4,039	100	5,229	100

2021 Boston 8th district City Council election
Candidate	Votes	%
Priscilla Kenzie Bok (incumbent)	7,038	97.90
Write-in	151	2.10
Total votes	7,189	100
