= Priscilla Fairfield Bok =

American astronomer (1896–1975)

- Born: Patricia Fairfield; April 14, 1896; Netherlands
- Died: November 1975 (aged 79)
- Education: Boston University
- Known for: star clusters, Milky Way
- Spouse: Bart Bok
- Children: 2 (including John)
- Relatives: Joan Toland Bok (daughter-in-law); Kenzie Bok (great-granddaughter)
- Scientific career
- Fields: astronomy
- Workplaces: Mount Stromlo Observatory

Priscilla Fairfield Bok (April 14, 1896 – November 1975) was an American astronomer and the wife of Dutch-born astronomer Bart Bok, Director of Mount Stromlo Observatory in Australia and later of Steward Observatory in Arizona, US. Their harmonious marriage accompanied the four decades of their close scientific collaboration, in which "it is difficult and pointless to separate his achievements from hers". They co-authored a number of academic papers on star clusters, stellar magnitudes, and the structure of the Milky Way galaxy. The Boks displayed great mutual enthusiasm for explaining astronomy to the public: described as "salesmen of the Milky Way" by The Boston Globe, their general interest book The Milky Way went through five editions and was said to be "one of the most successful astronomical texts ever written".

== Early life and research ==
Fairfield's family lived in Littleton, Massachusetts, where her father was a Unitarian minister. She worked to be able to afford the tuition fees at nearby Boston University. On weekends, she would bribe the watchman to allow her access to the University's solar telescope on the roof (a telescope later named in her honour). She published an article on sunspot observations in Popular Astronomy in 1916. Fairfield undertook her graduate studies with W. W. Campbell of Lick Observatory, and after graduating from UC Berkeley in 1921, was rejected from a job at the General Electric Company on declaring that she eventually wanted to be an astronomer. She rejected two West Coast offers in favour of Smith College Observatory in Massachusetts. There she began working on RR Lyrae variable stars on weekends with Harlow Shapley and Bertil Lindblad at the Harvard College Observatory.

Fairfield was an assistant professor in astronomy when she attended the International Astronomical Union's (IAU) Third General Assembly in Leiden in the Netherlands in 1928. Her assigned reception committee astronomer was a young graduate student, Bart Bok, ten years her junior; he proposed to her at the end of the conference. They corresponded for the next year, as Fairfield did not wish to rush into marriage. Within fourteen months, Bok had broken off his thesis studies at Groningen with Piet van Rhijn and moved across the Atlantic to Harvard on the invitation of Shapley, its director. They were married on September 9, 1929, within three days of Bok's arrival in the US, at her brother's house in New York state. Shapley was initially dubious of Bok, and protective of his protégée Priscilla.

Evidently so, after meeting Bok in 1928, Fairfield's professional trajectory was initially influenced by household/child-caring responsibilities and her husband's career choices, both in terms of its substance and geographical location. Although she continued teaching during her children's upbringing, her research endeavors were somewhat hindered by familial obligations. Fairfield and her husband welcomed their son, John, in 1930 and a daughter, Joyce, in 1933 coinciding with pivotal moments in Bok's career progression at Harvard. During their time in various Massachusetts locales, Fairfield juggled her role as a college tutor while Bok ascended as a university professor, often working twice the amount of weeks she did in a year. Once her children reached high school age, Fairfield found more opportunities to focus on her astronomical pursuits, albeit with lingering disparities in domestic responsibilities. Despite this, Fairfield contributed significantly to astronomical research, initially focusing on comets and star motion in the 1920s before transitioning to mapping new regions of the Milky Way alongside her husband.

== Harvard ==
They remained at Harvard for the next twenty-five years. Bart Bok was steadily promoted through the academic ranks at Harvard. Priscilla continued her research and writing, but was unpaid, a situation supported by Shapley, whom Bart described as "rather cheap when it came to hiring people". The Boks having two children, Priscilla was the at-home parent until their children finished high school, and published less research herself.

Their marriage began a close scientific collaboration that would span the next four decades, in which "it is difficult and pointless to separate his achievements from hers". They co-authored a number of academic papers on star clusters, stellar magnitudes, and the structure of the Milky Way. Their enthusiasm for explaining astronomy to the public led to them being well known: they were described as "salesmen of the Milky Way" by The Boston Globe in 1936.

Their main work together was a definitive undergraduate textbook and popular science book, The Milky Way, described as "one of the most successful astronomical texts ever written", which had five editions following its initial publication in 1941, and was translated into many languages. The writing of this book, begun in 1937, was shared equally according to Bart:

Priscilla and I were working on the writing of the book on the Milky Way, and she had a little room upstairs where she did all her writing. We lived in Lexington at the time. The cleaning woman would say to her, "Upstairs you go, you've gotta go to work, don't just sit here and talk to me." And she worked very hard at it, and in the beginning we had eight chapters in the book. We agreed that I would write four chapters and she would write four chapters, and that we loved each other dearly, no problems. Then, after we had gone through this for about five or six months and the writing was getting under way we said, "Now, you take my chapters, I'll take yours, now we get a better homogeneous book." Well, Priscilla stood one day in front of the fireplace, saying, "If you want to change things that way, my part can go in the fireplace right now." She didn't do it. But that was really the most critical time that we ever had in our married life, trying to meld these two times four chapters into eight chapters. But I think it worked out, and later on we did much better. We had fun about it. But I tell you, the writing of a joint book is not always easy, if you've got strong feelings about it.

== Australia ==
In 1957, the Boks left for Australia, where Bart took up the position of Director at Mount Stromlo Observatory in Canberra. In their nine years in Australia, Bart established a graduate program at Stromlo, obtained funds from the Prime Minister of the time, Robert Menzies, for a new telescope at Stromlo, established a field observatory at Siding Spring, and laid the foundations for the creation of the Anglo-Australian Telescope. This did not leave much time for astronomy research; Priscilla spent many nights at the Stromlo telescopes observing and then analyzing their data. This suited her greater interest in basic observations such as determining stellar positions and providing calibrated magnitudes.

Their close and openly loving relationship supported their scientific efforts: the pair were often seen walking on Mount Stromlo hand in hand, deep in conversation. Priscilla's quiet and empathetic personality complemented and tempered Bart's energetic and effervescent dynamism.

In the subsequent editions of their book, the Boks had to make major changes to accommodate the rapid progress in galactic astronomy. The approachability of the text for the general public was particularly important to Priscilla, according to Bart:

Each time where we got ready for a new edition, we used to say, "Now comes the time to appoint that committee." And we had an imaginary committee of about five people - an imaginary committee. Whenever we had a fight together as to whether something should go in or not, she would say, "Now, listen, you have your grandson on our committee. He couldn't understand this. You are writing for [astronomer] Jan Oort -- and that's all right, if you want to write for Jan Oort, write another book, but don't put it in our book."

== Return to the US ==
In 1966, the Boks moved back to the US for Bart to take up the Directorship of Steward Observatory in Arizona, which he held until 1970. Priscilla suffered a stroke in 1972; her health declined in the following years, and Bok resigned his position as vice-president of the IAU in 1974 and dedicated himself to her care. She died of a heart attack in November 1975.

== Recognition ==
Bok is commemorated by the asteroid (2137) Priscilla, named following her death. (Note: For (2137) Priscilla, the naming citation reads in part: "With her husband, Bart J. Bok, she participated in four decades of fruitful galactic research, first at the Harvard College Observatory, then at the Mt. Stromlo Observatory, Steward Observatory, with briefer tours elsewhere. She also enjoyed teaching astronomy courses successively at Smith College, Wellesley College and Connecticut College for Women. Together with her husband she prepared several editions of The Milky Way, a popular title in the Harvard Books on Astronomy. ") The Boks are jointly commemorated for their scientific contributions by a 43-km diameter crater on the far side of the Moon and by an asteroid discovered by Elizabeth Roemer in 1975, (1983) Bok. (Note: For (1983) Bok, the naming citation reads in part: "This is the first minor planet discovered with the 229-cm telescope of the Stewart Observatory to be numbered. It is named for the Boks in recognition of their role in bringing the large reflector of the Steward Observatory into operation and for their support of the astrometric work on comets, minor planets, and satellites. This minor planet was at far southern declination at discovery (and observations at Wellington were important in obtaining a reliable orbit). This is also in fitting association with the Boks, who have devoted much effort to study of the structure of the southern Milky Way and to encouragement of astronomy in the Southern Hemisphere.") Two Priscilla and Bart Bok Awards are jointly awarded each year by the Astronomical Society of the Pacific and the American Astronomical Society to astronomy-related projects at the Intel International Science and Engineering Fair, in recognition of the Boks' advocacy for astronomy education and work in public outreach. The Australian National University awards the Priscilla Fairfield Bok Prize to a female third-year science student each year. The primary library of the Monterey_Institute_for_Research_in_Astronomy is named after Priscilla Bok in recognition of her donation of the books that began it, and the early support the Boks gave the Institute.

== Publications ==
- The Milky Way. Bart J. Bok and Priscilla F. Bok. Harvard University Press. First edition 1941; fifth edition 1981.
- Bok's ADS record.
