= Elske Smith =

Dutch-American astronomer

Elske van Panhuys Smith (born 1929) is a Dutch-American astronomer, academic administrator, and author of books on astronomy. She has also been outspoken about discrimination against women in academia.

== Education and career ==
Smith was born in 1929 in Monaco as the daughter of a Dutch diplomat. She spent the early years of her life in Austria before moving to the Netherlands, Venezuela, Costa Rica, and finally in 1943 to Boston in the US. She remained in Boston to complete her high school and college education, as her father moved on to more posts. She majored in astronomy at Radcliffe College, after becoming interested in it through a freshman-year friend, and was mentored there by Dutch-American astronomer Bart Bok and by Harlow Shapley. She remained at Harvard University with her husband, Henry Smith, for graduate study on interstellar polarization with Bok. She completed her Ph.D. in 1956.

After difficulties finding a satisfactory solution to their two-body problem, Smith and her husband shifted from stellar astronomy to solar astronomy, then out of fashion, in order to obtain joint positions at the National Solar Observatory on Sacramento Peak, hers initially part-time. After a year, she was able to convert her position there to full time. Seven years later, in the early 1960s, they moved to Boulder, Colorado, so her husband could take a position at the National Bureau of Standards; she became a research fellow at the Joint Institute for Laboratory Astrophysics. They moved again, a year later, to Washington DC, where her husband had a position at NASA; she became a faculty member at the University of Maryland, College Park, and began focusing more on astronomy education than on research.

At Maryland, her work shifted to academic administration, initially as acting director of the astronomy program and eventually as an assistant vice chancellor. She moved to Virginia Commonwealth University as dean of humanities and science, held the position for twelve years, and then prior to retiring became the director of a new program in environmental studies.

== Books ==
Smith's books include:

- Solar Flares (with Henry J. Smith, Macmillan, 1963)
- Introductory Astronomy and Astrophysics (with Kenneth C. Jacobs, Saunders, 1973)

== Recognition ==
Smith was named a Fellow of the American Association for the Advancement of Science in 1966.
