= Bok (lunar crater) =

Crater on the Moon

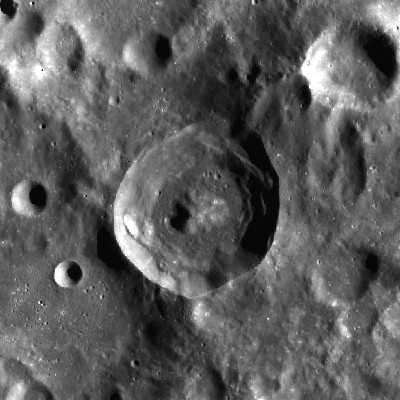
- LRO Wide Angle Camera image
- Coordinates: 20.26°S 171.58°W
- Diameter: 43.03 km (26.74 mi)
- Depth: Unknown
- Colongitude: 172° at sunrise
- Formation: Eratosthenian
- Eponym: Priscilla F. Bok; Bart J. Bok

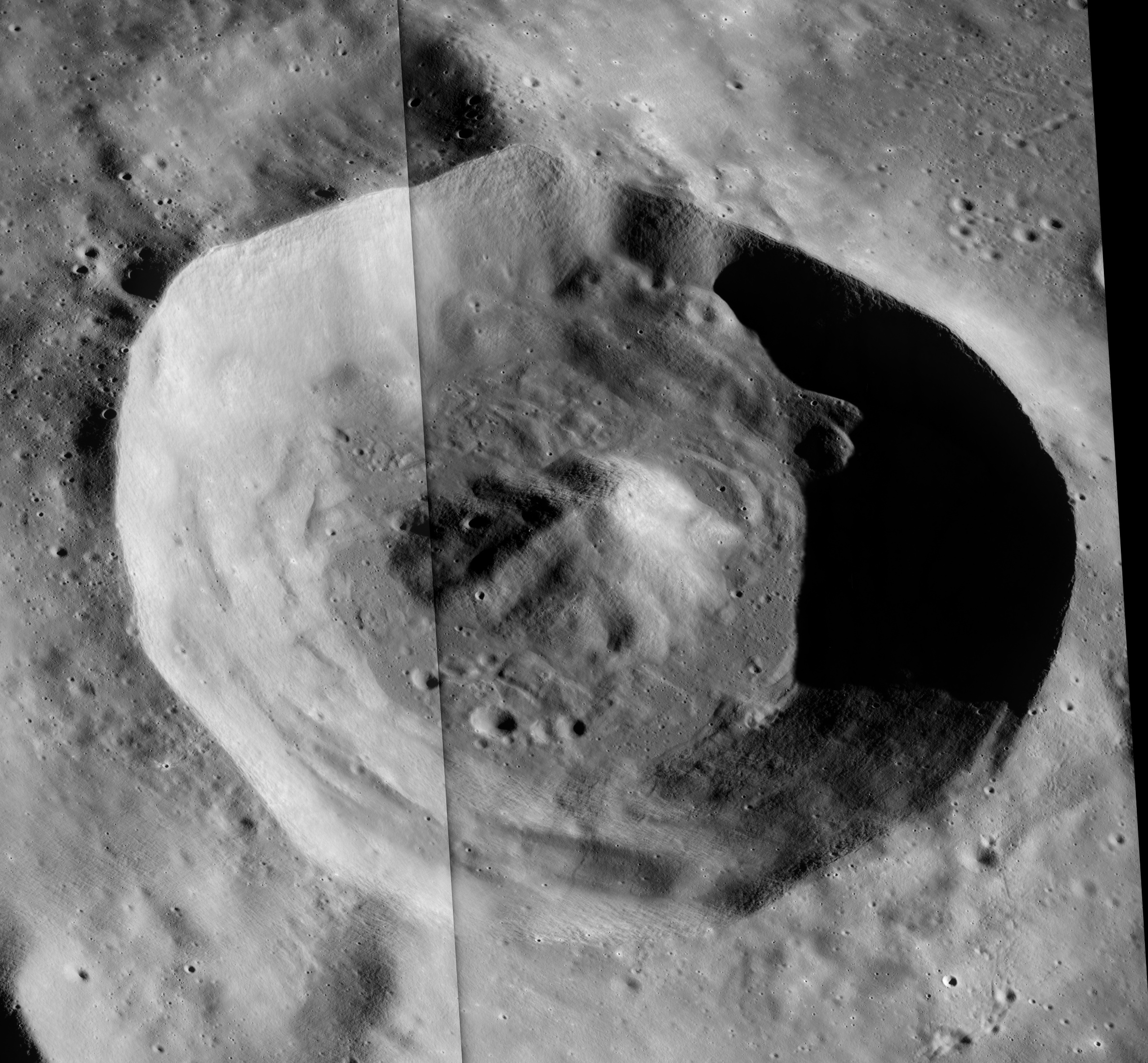
Apollo 17 panoramic camera mosaic

Bok is a lunar impact crater that is located on the far side of the Moon. To the southeast is the crater Sniadecki; to the north is McKellar, and further to the west is De Vries.

This formation dates to the Eratosthenian epoch of the lunar geologic timescale. The rim of Bok is well-defined and is not significantly eroded. The inner walls slope gently down to the nearly level interior floor, which has a central peak near the midpoint. There is a slight inward bulge along the northwest wall. The crater shows a strong signature of orthopyroxene, especially at the central peak, while the ejecta blanket has high concentrations of plagioclase and is mildly overabundant in iron oxide and titanium dioxide.

This crater is named after the American astronomer Priscilla F. Bok (1896-1975) and Dutch-American astronomer Bart J. Bok (1906-1983). The pair were married and spent a lifetime in close scientific collaboration. Its designation was officially adopted by the International Astronomical Union in 1979.

== Satellite craters ==
By convention these features are identified on lunar maps by placing the letter on the side of the crater midpoint that is closest to Bok.

Bok	Latitude	Longitude	Diameter
C	19.1° S	170.2° W	27 km
