= Sharon Durkan =

American politician and political consultant

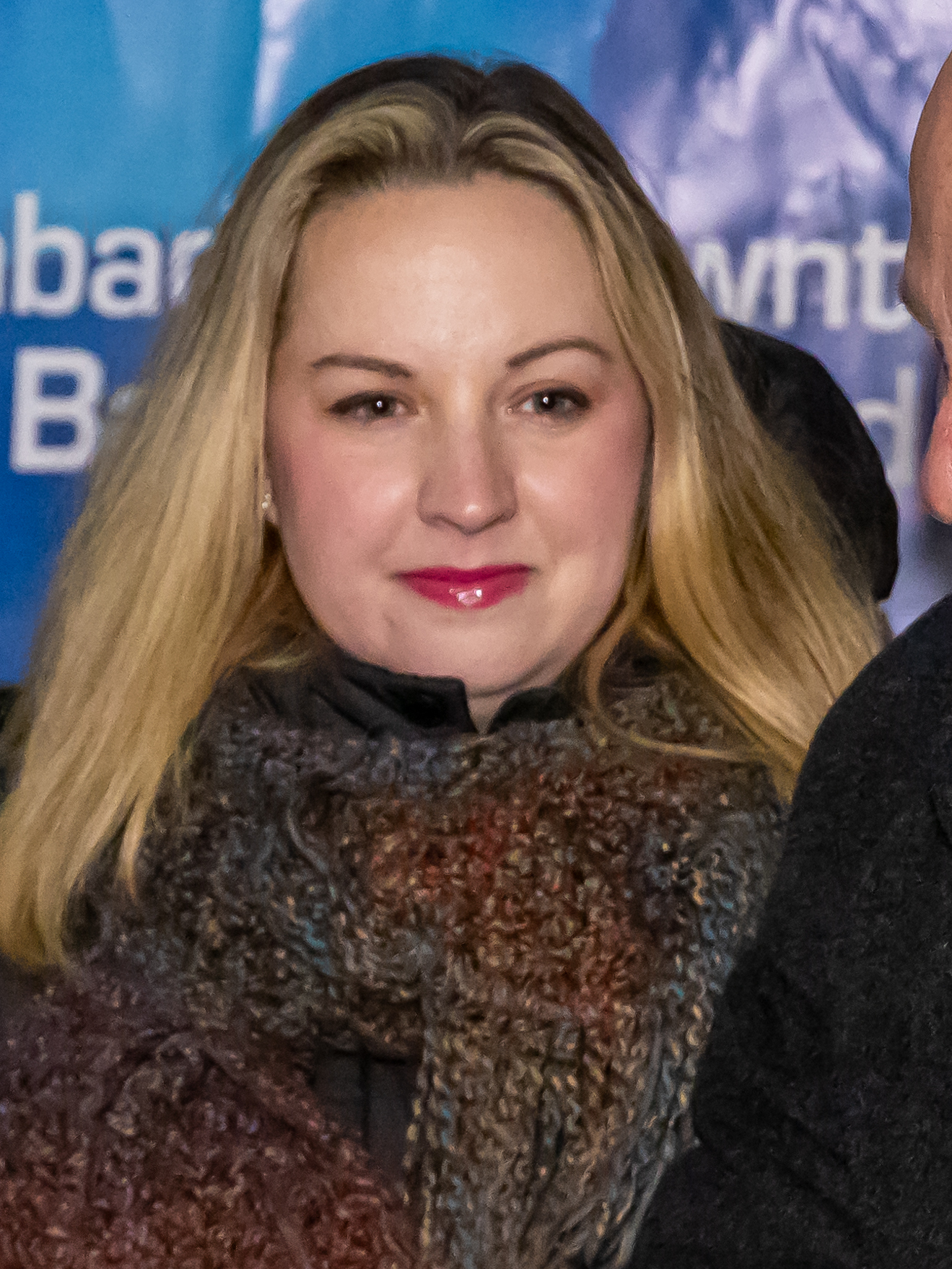
- Durkan in 2023

Member of the Boston City Council from the 8th district
- Incumbent
- Assumed office August 7, 2023
- Preceded by: Kenzie Bok

Personal details
- Party: Democratic
- Education: Smith College
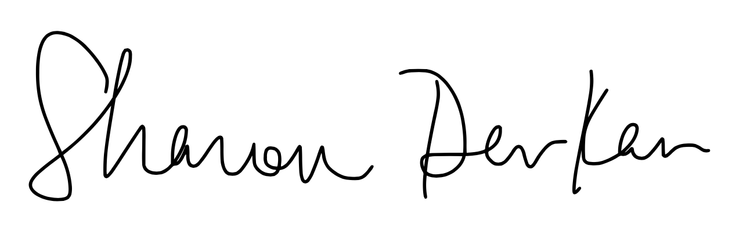
- Signature
- Website: Government webpage; Campaign website

Sharon Durkan is an American politician and political consultant currently serving as a member of the Boston City Council, representing its 8th district. She has held that office since August 2023.

== Early life ==
Durkan grew up in the U.S. state of Georgia. Durkan attended Smith College in Northampton, Massachusetts.

== Early political career ==
While in college, Durkan became the finance director for State Senator Eric Lesser. In 2015, shortly after graduating college, she began working for the reelection campaign of then-City Councilor Michelle Wu. She came to be an experienced political consultant. She worked as the Massachusetts Finance Director for U.S. Senator Ed Markey's 2020 reelection campaign. She taught training sessions in the Emerge Massachusetts program. She also took the position of chair of the Ward 5 Democratic Committee.

== Boston City Council ==
Durkan represents District 8 on the Boston City Council. The district covers some of the most densely populated areas of the city. It includes portions of Back Bay, Fenway, West End, Mission Hill and Beacon Hill.

=== July 2023 special election and partial term ===
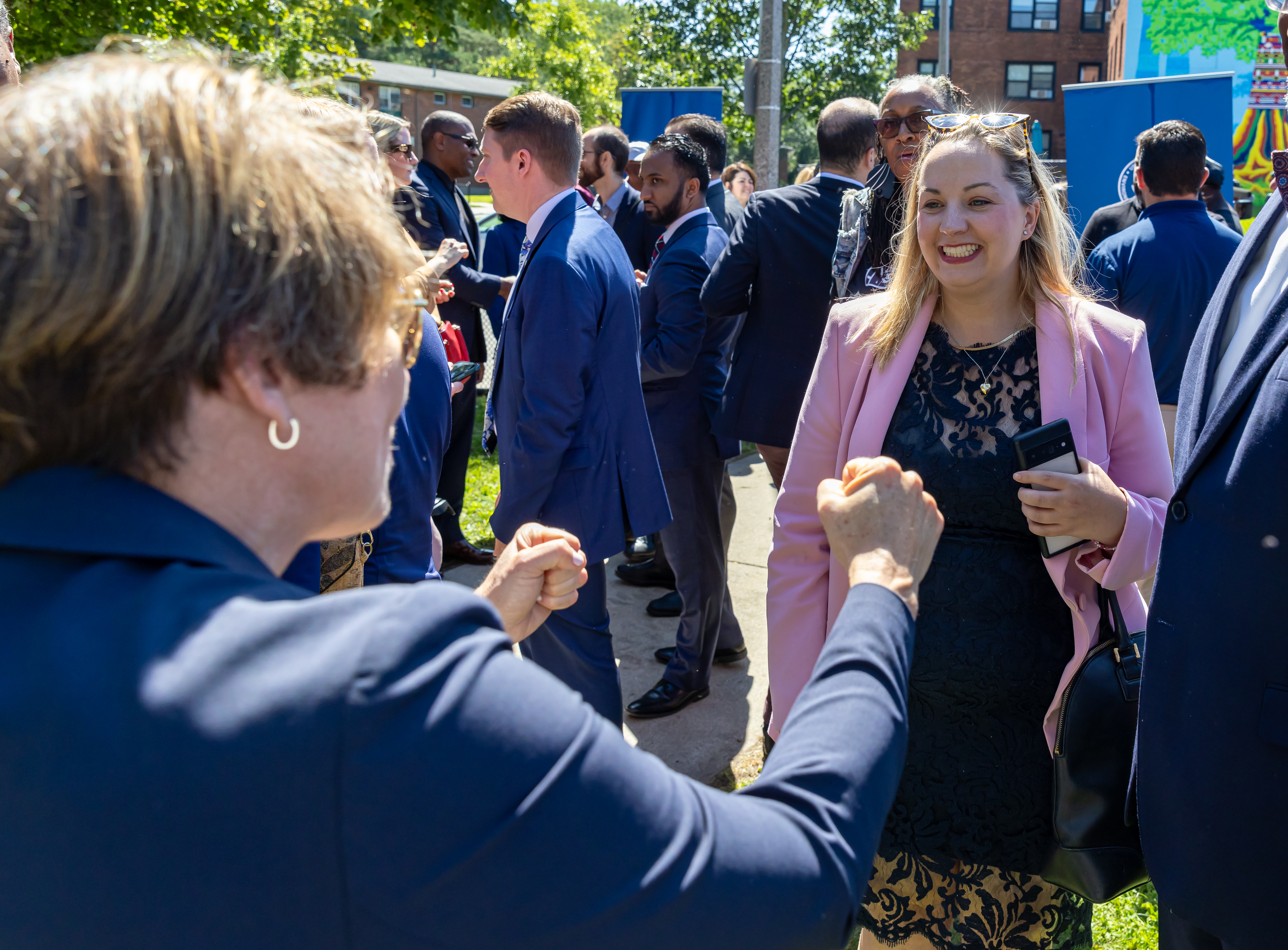
Durkan speaking with Governor Maura Healey in August 2023

On July 25, at the age of 32, Durkan was elected to the Boston City Council in a special election to fill the remainder of the term vacated by Kenzie Bok when Bok became the head of the Boston Housing Authority. Durkan's opponent had been Montez Haywood, a longtime prosecutor at the Suffolk County District Attorney's Office. The campaign was Durkan's first campaign for public office. Durkan won more than 70% of the vote, with 29% going to Haywood and a half-percent going to write-in votes. Haywood had previously run for the seat in 2019, having performed weakly in that election. Durkan's campaign was centered on issues related to transportation, housing, mental healthcare, and climate change. Durkan received a plethora of endorsements from notable politicians, including Senator Ed Markey, Mayor Michelle Wu, At-Large City Councilor Ruthzee Louijeune She also received the endorsement of her predecessor, Kenzie Bok. Durkan strongly outperformed her opponent in fundraising.

Durkan was sworn-in on August 7, 2023.

At a City Council meeting early October, Durkan and Frank Baker opposed holding an immediate vote on a resolution proposed at the meeting by Tania Fernandes Anderson related to the Gaza war. Unlike a different proposed resolution related to the conflict that was being discussed at the meeting, Fernandes Anderson's resolution was not focused on condemning the 2023 Hamas-led attack on Israel, and instead centered on calling for a ceasefire. Fernandes Anderson's resolution characterized the attack as a "military operation" rather than an act of terrorism. The resolution was referred to the committee of the whole instead of being voted on.

=== Second term ===
Durkan faced Montez Haywood again in a November 2023 election for a full term. The election map used for this election differed from that of the August special election, as it used a map redistricted to reflect the results of the 2020 United States Census. Durkan again received Mayor Wu's endorsement. Durkan won reelection, again capturing more than 70 percent of the vote. Durkan serves as chair of the council's Committee on Planning, Development, & Transportation.

In February 2024, Durkan proposed the idea of having the city license official Boston merchandise as a means of generating revenue both for the city government and small businesses in the city. Durkan pointed to a similar venture that New York City had launched more than a decade prior. Jim Rooney (the CEO of the Greater Boston Chamber of Commerce) lent his tentative personal support to Durkan's proposal, conditioning full support on small businesses being consulted. Sharon Durkan ran unopposed for reelection and was reelected to the Boston City Council for District 8 on November 4, 2025 for a third time.

== Electoral history ==
2023 Boston City Council 8th district special election
Candidate	Votes	%
Sharon Durkan	1,968	70.04
Montez Haywood	824	29.32
Write-ins	18	0.64
Total votes	2,810	100

2023 Boston City Council 8th district general election
Candidate	Votes	%
Sharon Durkan	3,686	70.44
Montez Haywood	1,512	28.89
Write-ins	35	0.67
Total votes	5,233	100
