= Andrew McKellar =

Canadian astronomer

Andrew McKellar, MBE, FRSC (February 2, 1910 – May 6, 1960) was a Canadian astronomer who first detected the presence of molecular matter in interstellar space, and found the first evidence of the cosmic radiation left over from the Big Bang.

He was born in Vancouver, British Columbia, Canada, to Scottish parents, one of six children of John H. and Mary Littleson McKellar. He studied mathematics and physics at the University of British Columbia, graduating in 1930. He began graduate studies at the University of California, being awarded his M.S. in 1932 and a Ph.D. the following year. Applying to the United States National Research Council, he was awarded a post-doctoral study program for two years at MIT.

In 1935 he joined the Dominion Astrophysical Observatory, where he performed research into astrophysics. He was married to Mary Crouch (b. June 3, 1911, d. Nov. 30, 2000) in 1938, and the couple bore two children, Andrew Robert William (Bob) (b. March 28, 1945), and Mary Barbara (b. Nov. 1, 1946) (McKellar) Bulman-Fleming. During World War II he served with the Royal Canadian Navy, in the Directorate of Operational Research.

In 1940, McKellar made the first identification of molecular matter in the interstellar medium, identifying the spectrum of the organic cyano radical (CN) and the methylidyne radical (CH). The following year, his analysis of the spectra of the cyano radical showed that the surrounding space was very cold with a temperature of approximately −271 °C. At the time, the significance of this was not appreciated; the distinguished Canadian chemist and future Nobel Laureate Gerhard Herzberg said that the temperature measurement "...has of course a very restricted meaning". Almost 25 years later Arno Penzias and Robert Woodrow Wilson detected microwave radiation coming from all regions of the sky corresponding to the same temperature of −271 °C found by McKellar, thus revealing its ubiquity and relation to the radiation left over from the Big Bang. McKellar's early death, after a prolonged illness, in 1960 precluded him from consideration for the Nobel Prize awarded to Penzias and Wilson in 1978.

Following the war, from 1952 until 1953, he was visiting professor at the University of Toronto department of physics. Between 1956 and 1958 he served as president of the Astronomical Society of the Pacific, then in 1959 he became president of the Royal Astronomical Society of Canada for a year. He continued working at the DAO up until four days before he died in Victoria, British Columbia from complications due to lymphoma contracted during his service in the Navy during the War.

He was noted for his work in molecular spectroscopy. Among his contributions was the first estimation of the temperature of interstellar gas (and therefore deep space) as 2.4° K based on the excitation of CN doublet lines, and finding evidence for the carbon-nitrogen nuclear cycle as the energy source for carbon stars. (The temperature estimate was subsequently confirmed with the discovery of the cosmic microwave background radiation, which has a measured temperature of 2.725 K.) During his career he was the author (or co-author) of 73 scientific publications.

== Awards and honors ==
- M.B.E. for his war service.
- Fellow of the Royal Society of Canada.
- The DAO 1.2-m telescope was named the McKellar Telescope.
- The crater McKellar on the Moon is named after him.
- 7150 McKellar (1929 TD1), a main-belt minor planet, is named for him.

== Partial bibliography ==
- McKellar, A., 1940, "Evidence for the Molecular Origin of Some Hitherto Unidentified Interstellar Lines", Publications of the Astronomical Society of the Pacific, Vol. 52, No. 307, p. 187.
- McKellar, A., 1947, "Intensity Measurements on the Main and Isotopic Carbon Bands in Spectra of the R-Type Stars", Publications of the Astronomical Society of the Pacific, Vol. 59, No. 349, p. 186.
- McKellar, A., 1950, "The C^{12} to C^{13} Abundance Ratio in Stellar Atmospheres", Publications of the Astronomical Society of the Pacific, Vol. 62, No. 365, p. 110.
