= McKellar (crater) =

Crater on the Moon

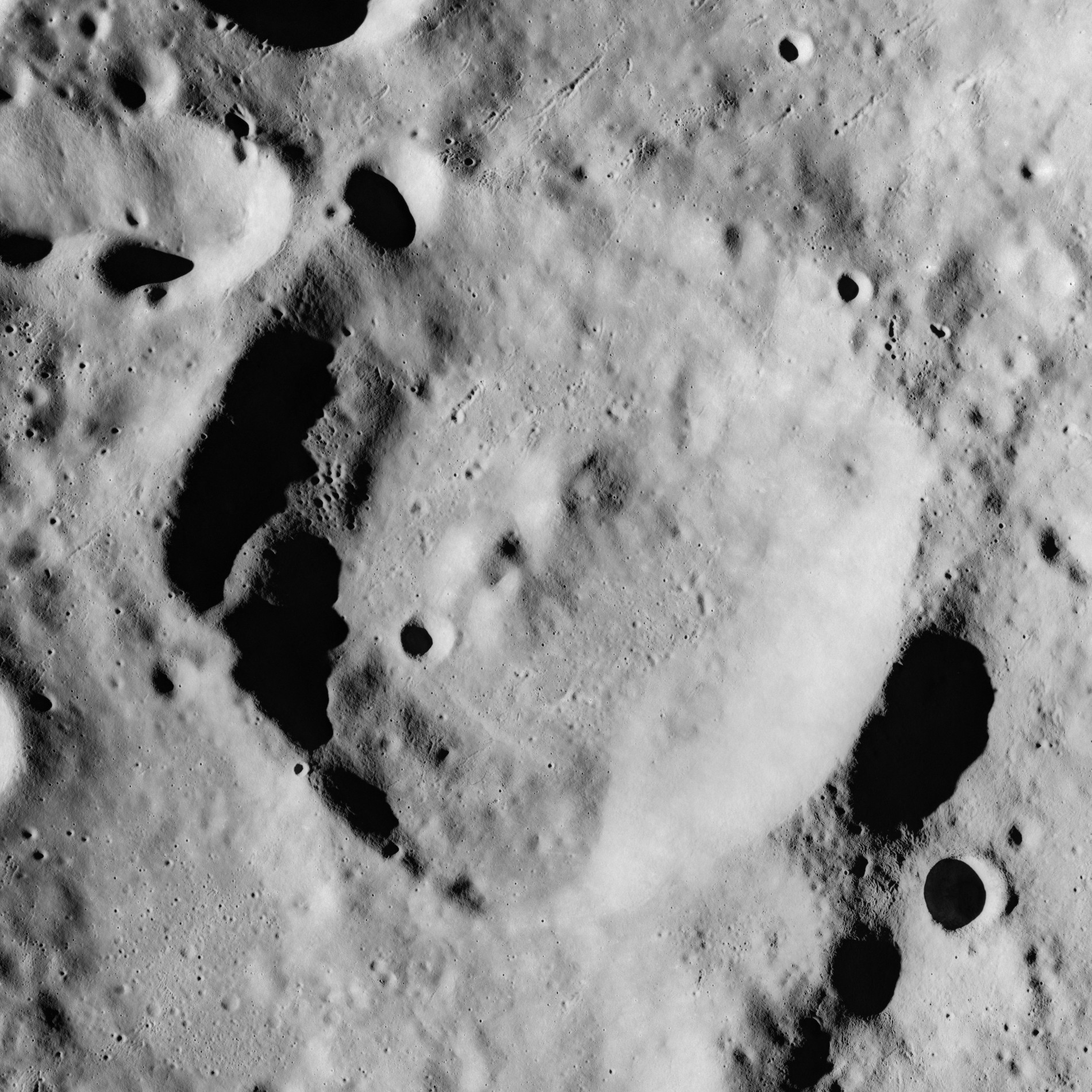
- Apollo 17 image
- Coordinates: 15.72°S 170.86°W
- Diameter: 50.16 km (31.17 mi)
- Depth: Unknown
- Colongitude: 171° at sunrise
- Eponym: Andrew McKellar

McKellar is a lunar impact crater on the Moon's far side, and it cannot be viewed directly from the Earth. It lies to the southwest of the crater Crookes, and the ray system from this impact covers the floor and sides of McKellar. To the south is the slightly smaller Bok.

This crater is somewhat eroded, with a small crater along the northwestern rim. The interior floor is relatively level except for a cluster of three ridges arrayed to the north and west of the midpoint. Just to the south of this crater is a patch of high albedo on the surface, which is usually interpreted as an indication of a relatively fresh impact.

The crater was named by the IAU in 1970 after Canadian astronomer Andrew McKellar.

== Satellite craters ==
By convention these features are identified on lunar maps by placing the letter on the side of the crater midpoint that is closest to McKellar.

McKellar	Latitude	Longitude	Diameter
B	13.1° S	169.1° W	16 km
S	16.0° S	173.3° W	23 km
T	15.1° S	173.0° W	45 km
U	13.9° S	174.5° W	37 km
