= John F. Bok =

American lawyer

- Born: John Fairfield Bok; 1930; Boston, Massachusetts, U.S.
- Died: September 27, 2014 (age 84); Massachusetts General Hospital in Boston, Massachusetts
- Occupation: Lawyer
- Spouse: Joan Toland (m. 1955)
- Children: 2
- Parents: Bart Bok (father); Priscilla Fairfield (mother)
- Relatives: Kenzie Bok (granddaughter)

John Fairfield Bok (1930–2014) was an American lawyer who was influentially involved in advocacy on municipal matters in Boston.

== Early life and education ==
Bok was the son of renown astronomers Bart Bok and Priscilla Fairfield Bok. He was born in Boston, and raised in Belmont, Cambridge, Lexington (all communities in Massachusetts). He graduated high school at Belmont High School.

Bok attended Harvard College, studying government. He spent one of his summers of college working in Washington, D.C., for Secretary of State Dean Acheson. Bok graduated Harvard in 1951. After taking a year off school, Bok began Harvard Law School.

== Career ==
Bok began work at Ropes & Gray. Also starting her career at the firm was John's wife, Joan. Joan was a Harvard Law classmate he had married shortly after graduation. Bok left the firm for two years to work as legal counsel to Edward J. Logue, the head of the Boston Redevelopment Authority. He thereafter returned to the firm. By the end of the 1960s, Bok joined a firm that later took the name Csaplar & Bok. At his firm, he worked with such colleagues as Margaret H. Marshall. The firm would merge with Gaston & Snow in 1990. In his legal career, Bok also worked as the first outside general counsel for the Massachusetts Housing Finance Agency.

Bok had a heavy behind-the-scenes influence on civic matters in Boston and other cities. Bok was involved in founding The Boston Harbor Association advocacy group. He was involved in crafting a law regarding condominiums that helped to spur development on Boston's wharves. He was also an advocate for the construction of new affordable housing. As a housing advocate, Bok cofounded the Citizens' Housing and Planning Association and served as leader of the Massachusetts Housing Partnership. As a historic preservationist, Bok was involved in protecting buildings such as Boston's Old City Hall from demolition. He also worked on historic preservation projects in other New England communities. After the 1983 Boston mayoral election, Bok led the transition team of election-winner Raymond Flynn.

Bok and his wife Joan both involved themselves in neighborhood matters the Beacon Hill neighborhood of Boston, where they resided. In the 1960s, aiming to attract more young families to choose to move into the neighborhood of Boston rather than fleeing to the suburbs, the Boks partnered with several neighbors to purchase three of the neighborhoods many rooming houses and convert them into single-family residences that were then sold to young families. The Boks were opposed to the neighborhood being overrun by office space conversions of existing properties, which they were concerned would transform the residential characteristic of the area into more of a business district. The Boks, both lawyers, utilized their legal knowledge of zoning to block conversions of residential properties into offices. Bok pushed for the conversion of surplus school structures into new housing. Bok also served as the president of the Beacon Hill Nursery School and Beacon Hill Civil Association.

Among the organizations whose boards Bok served on were the Museum of African American History, Boston Ballet, and Massachusetts Horticultural Society.

== Personal life and death ==
Bok married Harvard Law classmate Joan Toland in 1955, shortly after both of them graduated Harvard Law. They both took the Massachusetts bar exam, and became the first married couple to pass it at the same time. In her own career, Joan Bok worked her way up to become the chairwoman of New England Electric System. The Boks resided together in the Beacon Hill neighborhood of Boston since the mid-1950s. They had two sons together, Alexander Toland Bok and Geoffrey Robins Bok.

Bok is the grandfather of Kenzie Bok, a former Boston City Council member and the current head of the Boston Housing Authority.

Bok died September 27, 2014, of aspiration pneumonia at the age of 84 while at Massachusetts General Hospital.
