= 1930 Lucifer =

Carbonaceous main-belt asteroid

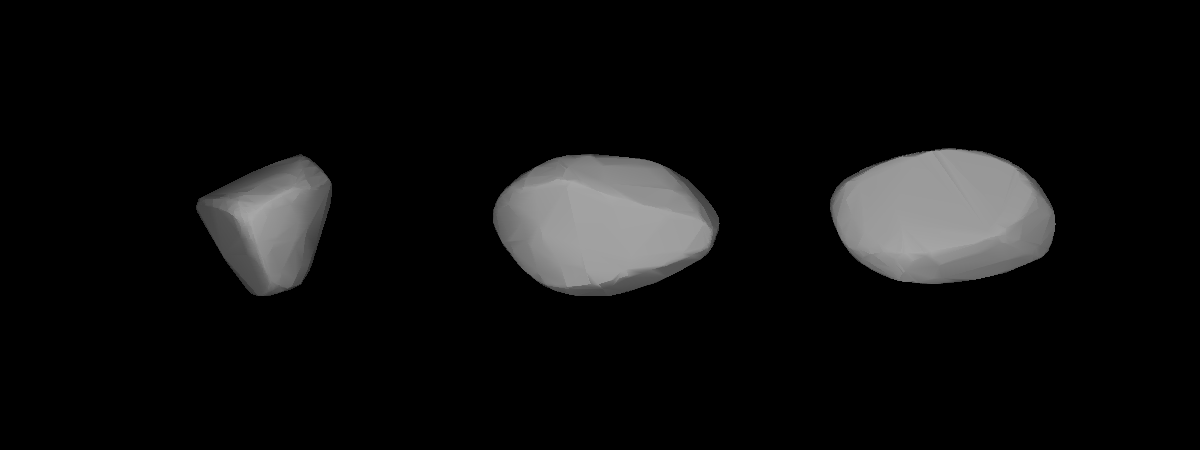
- Lightcurve-based 3D-model of Lucifer

Discovery
- Discovered by: E. Roemer
- Discovery site: NOFS (USNO)
- Discovery date: 29 October 1964

Designations
- Pronunciation: /ˈljuːsɪfər/ LEW-si-fər
- Named after: Lucifer (religion)
- Alternative designations: 1964 UA · 1954 SQ; 1954 TC
- Minor planet category: main-belt · (outer)

Orbital characteristics
- Epoch 4 September 2017 (JD 2458000.5)
- Uncertainty parameter 0
- Observation arc: 62.61 yr (22,870 days)
- Aphelion: 3.3078 AU
- Perihelion: 2.4883 AU
- Semi-major axis: 2.8981 AU
- Eccentricity: 0.1414
- Orbital period (sidereal): 4.93 yr (1,802 days)
- Mean anomaly: 334.70°
- Mean motion: 0° 11^{m} 59.28^{s} / day
- Inclination: 14.057°
- Longitude of ascending node: 318.53°
- Argument of perihelion: 341.37°

Physical characteristics
- Dimensions: 26.90 km (derived); 27.00±3.2 km 30.92±0.84 km 34.04±11.55 km 34.437±0.168 km 36.335±0.376 km 39.61±0.50 km
- Synodic rotation period: 13.0536±0.0005 h 13.054±0.004 h 13.056±0.005 h 13.092±0.0808 h
- Geometric albedo: 0.05±0.03; 0.050±0.001; 0.0584±0.0081; 0.067±0.007; 0.074±0.011; 0.0886 (derived); 0.1058±0.030
- Spectral type: SMASS = Cgh · C
- Absolute magnitude (H): 10.818±0.002 (R) · 10.9 · 11.00 · 11.1 ·

1930 Lucifer, provisional designation 1964 UA, is a carbonaceous asteroid from the outer regions of the asteroid belt, approximately 34 kilometers in diameter. It was discovered on 29 October 1964, by American astronomer Elizabeth Roemer at the Flagstaff station (NOFS) of the United States Naval Observatory (USNO). It is named after Lucifer, the "shining one" or "light-bearer" from the Hebrew Bible.

== Orbit ==
Lucifer orbits the Sun in the outer main-belt at a distance of 2.5–3.3 AU once every 4 years and 11 months (1,802 days). Its orbit has an eccentricity of 0.14 and an inclination of 14° with respect to the ecliptic. It was first identified as 1954 SQ at Goethe Link Observatory in 1954, extending the body's observation arc by 10 years prior to its official discovery observation at NOFS.

== Physical characteristics ==
=== Spectral type ===
In the SMASS taxonomy, Lucifer is a Cgh-type that belongs to the carbonaceous C-group of asteroids.

=== Diameter and albedo ===
According to the surveys carried out by the Infrared Astronomical Satellite IRAS, the Japanese Akari satellite, and NASA's Wide-field Infrared Survey Explorer with its subsequent NEOWISE mission, Lucifer measures between 27.00 and 39.61 kilometers in diameter, and its surface has an albedo between 0.05 and 0.1058. The Collaborative Asteroid Lightcurve Link derives an albedo of 0.0886 and calculates a diameter of 26.90 kilometers based on an absolute magnitude of 11.1.

=== Rotation and pole axis ===
In October 2003, a rotational lightcurve of Lucifer was obtained from photometric observations by American astronomer Brian Warner at his Palmer Divide Observatory in Colorado. Lightcurve analysis gave a well-defined rotation period of 13.056 hours with a brightness amplitude of 0.44 magnitude (U=3).

In January 2005, observations by astronomer Horacio Correia gave a concurring period of 13.054 hours and an amplitude of 0.22 magnitude (U=3). In 2013, another lightcurve was obtained at the Palomar Transient Factory (U=2), and a modeled lightcurve from various data sources, including the AstDyS database, gave another concurring period of 13.0536 hours and found a pole of (32.0°,17.0°).

== Naming ==
Lutz D. Schmadel's Dictionary of Minor Planet Names reads "Named for the proud, rebellious archangel, identified with Satan, who was expelled from heaven". The official naming citation was published by the Minor Planet Center on 1 August 1978 (M.P.C. 4419).
