= Bart Bok =

American astronomer and lecturer (1906–1983)

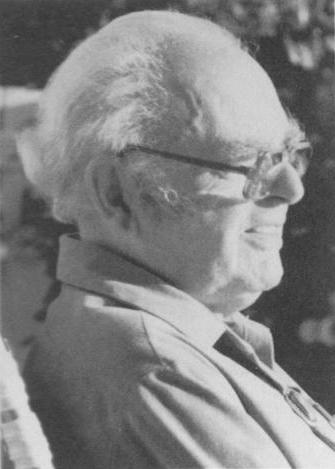
- Bok in his final year, 1983
- Born: Bartholomeus Jan Bok; April 28, 1906; Hoorn, Netherlands
- Died: August 5, 1983 (aged 77); Tucson, Arizona, United States
- Citizenship: American
- Education: Leiden; Groningen
- Known for: The Milky Way; Bok globules
- Spouse: Priscilla Fairfield Bok
- Children: Joyce and John
- Scientific career
- Fields: Astronomy
- Workplaces: Harvard University; Mount Stromlo Observatory; Steward Observatory
- Doctoral students: Elske Smith

Bartholomeus Jan "Bart" Bok (April 28, 1906 – August 5, 1983) was a Dutch-American astronomer, teacher, and lecturer. He is best known for his work on the structure and evolution of the Milky Way galaxy, and for the discovery of Bok globules, which are small, densely dark clouds of interstellar gas and dust that can be seen silhouetted against brighter backgrounds. Bok suggested that these globules may be in the process of contracting, before forming into stars.

Bok married fellow astronomer Priscilla Fairfield in 1929, and for the remainder of their lives, the two collaborated so closely on their astronomical work that the Royal Astronomical Society said "from that point on it is difficult and pointless to separate his achievements from hers". The Boks displayed such great mutual enthusiasm for explaining astronomy to the public that The Boston Globe described them in 1936 as "salesmen of the Milky Way". They worked together on research and co-authored academic papers, and their general interest book The Milky Way went through five editions and was "widely acclaimed as one of the most successful astronomical books ever published".

Bok's primary research interest was the structure of our galaxy. When he was asked by the editors of Who's Who in America to submit a statement concerning "Thoughts on My Life", he wrote, "I have been a happy astronomer for the past sixty years, wandering through the highways and byways of our beautiful Milky Way."

Bart Bok was an exceedingly popular personality in the field of astronomy, noted for his affability and humor. When asteroid 1983 Bok was named for him and his wife Priscilla, he thanked the International Astronomical Union for giving him "a little plot of land that I can retire to and live on."

== Early life and studies 1906–1929 ==
Bok was born in the small Dutch town of Hoorn, north of Amsterdam, to Jan Bok, who was a sergeant-major in the Dutch army, and Gesina Annetta (née van der Lee) Bok, but he spent a good deal of his childhood with his grandparents in the town of Haarlem, where he attended primary school. He attended high school in The Hague, excelling at mathematics and science, and he also told the story that this was where he met a Scoutmaster who introduced him to the night sky while on camping trips away from the city lights. After completing high school, he went on to study astronomy at Leiden and Groningen Universities.

In 1928, he attended the International Astronomical Union (IAU) Third General Assembly in Leiden in the Netherlands. Priscilla Fairfield was an associate professor in Astronomy, and the young Bart Bok was assigned to her reception committee. He was a graduate student ten years her junior, but he fell in love and proposed to her at the end of the conference. Priscilla did not accept his proposal at the time, and Bart corresponded with her for the next year before she finally agreed.

The following year, Bok broke off his thesis studies at Groningen with Piet van Rhijn and moved across the Atlantic to Cambridge, Massachusetts, on the invitation of Harlow Shapley, director of Harvard College Observatory, whom he had also met at the same IAU Assembly where he met Priscilla. On September 9, 1929, two days after moving to the US, the two were married. This caused some awkwardness with their mutual superior Shapley, who regarded Priscilla as something of a protégée and was protective of her. While Bok had the greatest admiration for Shapley, it took Shapley time to build the required level of trust with Bok.

== Harvard 1929–1957 ==
The spectacular star-forming region around Eta Carinae was the subject of Bok's doctoral dissertation. This image by the VLT Survey Telescope

The Boks remained at Harvard University for almost thirty years, from 1929 until 1957, where he taught astronomy and directed the Harvard Observatory. Bart was steadily promoted through the academic ranks: he completed his Doctoral dissertation entitled "A Study of the Eta Carinae Region" in 1932, became an assistant professor in 1933, an associate professor in 1939, associate director of the Harvard Observatory by 1946, and he became a full professor in 1947 when he was appointed to the Robert Wheeler Wilson Chair in Astronomy (some sources say this happened in 1945). Meanwhile, Priscilla was also conducting her own research and writing with Bart, but she was not being paid, which prompted Bart to describe Shapley as "rather cheap when it came to hiring people".

The Boks had two children: a son, John Fairfield, in 1930 and a daughter, Joyce Annetta (now Mrs John Ambruster), in 1933. Priscilla stayed at home until the children finished high school, so she published less research herself in this period. Nevertheless, she was consistently involved with supporting Bart's research and their public outreach activities often put them together and gave her some degree of recognition. When Bart became a naturalized US citizen in 1938, he shortened his first name to "Bart".

Their marriage began a close scientific collaboration that would span the next four decades, in which the Royal Astronomical Society said "it is difficult and pointless to separate his achievements from hers". They co-authored a number of academic papers on star clusters, stellar magnitudes, and the structure of the Milky Way. Bok was fiercely interested in the mechanical processes which form star clusters and galaxies, and his paper "The Apparent Clustering of External Galaxies" (Nature, vol. 133, p. 578) was the first to demonstrate how dissipation of a star cluster relates to its density, and so by examining the clusters in our galaxy he concluded that it cannot be older than about twenty billion years.

Their enthusiasm for explaining astronomy to the public led to them being well known: they were described as "salesmen of the Milky Way" by The Boston Globe in 1936. Their main work together was a definitive undergraduate textbook and popular science book, The Milky Way, "widely acclaimed as one of the most successful astronomical books ever published", which had five editions over forty years following its initial publication in 1941, and was translated into many languages. The writing of this book, begun in 1937, was shared equally – according to Bart:

Priscilla and I were working on the writing of the book on the Milky Way, and she had a little room upstairs where she did all her writing. We lived in Lexington at the time. The cleaning woman would say to her, "Upstairs you go, you've gotta go to work, don't just sit here and talk to me." And she worked very hard at it, and in the beginning we had eight chapters in the book. We agreed that I would write four chapters and she would write four chapters, and that we loved each other dearly, no problems. Then, after we had gone through this for about five or six months and the writing was getting under way we said, "Now, you take my chapters, I'll take yours, now we get a better homogeneous book." Well, Priscilla stood one day in front of the fireplace, saying, "If you want to change things that way, my part can go in the fireplace right now." She didn't do it. But that was really the most critical time that we ever had in our married life, trying to meld these two times four chapters into eight chapters. But I think it worked out, and later on we did much better. We had fun about it. But I tell you, the writing of a joint book is not always easy, if you've got strong feelings about it.

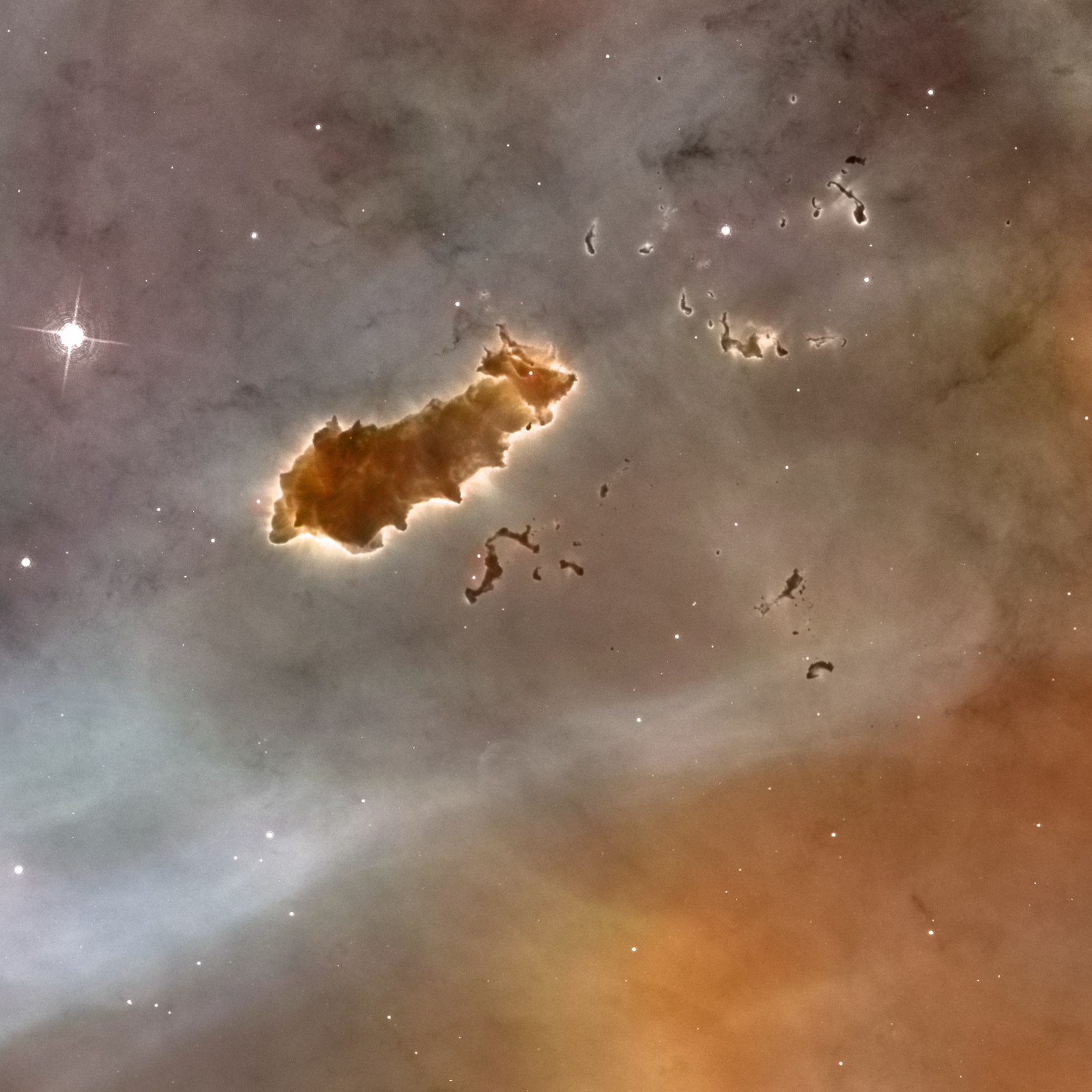
The Caterpillar, a Bok Globule in the Carina Nebula. Picture by the Hubble Space Telescope.

In the 1940s, Bok first observed small, dark clouds of dense cosmic dust and gas which would later become known as Bok globules in the Milky Way. In a paper published in 1947, Bok and E.F. Reilly hypothesized that these clouds were "similar to insect's cocoons" that were undergoing gravitational collapse to form new stars and star clusters. This hypothesis was difficult to verify due to the observational difficulties of establishing what was happening inside a dense dark cloud that obscured all visible light emitted from within it, but after Bok's death his ideas were confirmed when analyses of near infrared observations published in 1990 confirmed that stars were being born inside Bok globules.

The Bok family also traveled to spend time setting up two international facilities on opposite sides of the world. During 1941, Bok helped to set up the Tonantzintla Observatory in Tonantzintla, Mexico. In 1950, he set up the Schmidt Telescope at Harvard's Boyden Station in South Africa. While there, he and Priscilla also enjoyed the opportunity to study the southern stars, including Eta Carinae which had been the subject of Bart's doctoral dissertation.

Bok's record of success in setting up new observatories would guide the rest of his career. Starting in 1952 he led the efforts to fund and construct a major radio telescope facility at Harvard's Oak Ridge Observatory. Unusually for his time, Bok believed that the combination of radio and optical astronomy could produce exceptional benefits. Initially, this was inspired by the difficulty and unreliability of visual star counting techniques, especially when there is obscuring dust. This combined approach proved to be vital in analyzing the interstellar medium, and particularly in developing an understanding of what was happening inside Bok Globules.

== Australia 1957–1966 ==
In 1957, the Boks moved to Australia, where Bart took up the position of Director at Mount Stromlo Observatory in the Australian National University (ANU) in Canberra, which he was to hold for the next nine years. His presence was a crucial factor in the development of optical astronomy in Australia, and its integration with the well-established field of radio astronomy. During his tenure, Bok established a thriving international graduate program at Stromlo which became known as "Harvard in the South", obtained funds from the Prime Minister of the time, Robert Menzies, for a new telescope at Stromlo, and established a field observatory at Siding Spring.

He was a pioneer in the use of electronic computers for astronomical observing, and the first person to use them for any purpose at the ANU: in February 1960 he had the first one installed in the observatory. He was also a pioneer in taking advantage of mass media to promote astronomy: he made a television series which was broadcast on the ABC, reaching far more people than any of his predecessors dreamed of and helping to build awareness and support for astronomy in Australia.

By the early 1960s, Mount Stromlo had developed into one of the leading facilities for observational astronomy in the southern hemisphere. However, Bok appreciated the limitations of the site of Mount Stromlo due to weather and increasing light pollution, and he initiated a site-testing program which stretched across the country. In 1962, Siding Spring Mountain was chosen for the creation of a world-class telescope facility. As Siding Spring grew, Bok threw his support behind a new project: what would become Australia's largest optical telescope, the 3.893 metres (153.3 in) Anglo-Australian Telescope.

This did not leave much time for astronomy research; Priscilla spent many nights at the Stromlo telescopes observing and analyzing their data. This suited her greater interest in basic observations such as determining stellar positions and providing calibrated magnitudes. Their close relationship and the way their personalities complemented one another supported their scientific efforts: Priscilla's empathy balanced Bart's energetic and dynamic nature.

In the subsequent editions of their book, the Boks made major changes to accommodate the rapid progress in galactic astronomy. The approachability of the text for the general public was particularly important to Priscilla, according to Bart:

Each time where we got ready for a new edition, we used to say, "Now comes the time to appoint that committee." And we had an imaginary committee of about five people - an imaginary committee. Whenever we had a fight together as to whether something should go in or not, she would say, "Now, listen, you have your grandson on our committee. He couldn't understand this. You are writing for [astronomer] Jan Oort – and that's all right, if you want to write for Jan Oort, write another book, but don't put it in our book."

Bok was a tireless promoter of astronomy to the general public, trying to keep to a routine of devoting three days each month to public lectures:

one in Canberra or near Canberra, one in a capital city, and one in the country ... I accepted almost any invitation I could get to give a lecture ... my price was that if I spoke to [a group of adults] ... I would [also] address the local high school and this paid off amazingly well in a direction that had never occurred to me, because in a high school audience there is generally a nephew or a niece of a Member of Parliament, and all the Members of Parliament learned about it.

This ability to "sell" astronomy to the public and especially to the Members of Parliament was crucial in winning support for such huge, and expensive, projects as the Anglo-Australian Observatory against competing scientific priorities. In the end, he did not get to see it completed; the formal agreement to construct the AAO was reached the year after he and Priscilla left Australia to return to the US.

== Return to the US 1966–1983 ==
In 1966, the Boks moved back to the US, where Bart took up the roles of Head of the Department of Astronomy at the University of Arizona and Director of Steward Observatory, posts which he held until 1970. He was largely responsible for the construction of the 90 inches (2.3 m) telescope at the Kitt Peak National Observatory, and oversaw a doubling of the university's staff and growth in the graduate student program until by 1970 it was ranked fifth in the US, and Steward was regarded as "one of the world's premier astronomical research institutions."

From 1970, when he left his positions at Steward University and the University of Arizona, Bok became more actively involved in national and global organizations for professional astronomers. In 1970, he became vice-president of the executive committee of the International Astronomical Union (IAU), and in 1973 he was appointed for a second three-year term in the same position. Overlapping with this, he also served as president of the American Astronomical Society (AAS) from 1972 to 1974.

Priscilla suffered a stroke in 1972; her health declined in the following years, and Bok resigned his positions with the IAU and the AAS in 1974 and dedicated himself to her care. She died of a heart attack in November 1975.

In 1975 Bok coauthored the statement Objections to Astrology, which was endorsed by 186 professional astronomers, astrophysicists, and other scientists, including nineteen winners of the Nobel Prize. The statement was published in The Humanist and copies were sent to every major newspaper in the US. This led to the formation of the Committee for the Scientific Investigation of Claims of the Paranormal (now called the Committee for Skeptical Inquiry), of which he was a founding Fellow. In 2000, Bok was voted by readers of Skeptical Inquirer magazine as one of the "outstanding skeptics of the twentieth century". At a meeting of the executive council of CSI in Denver, Colorado in April 2011, Bok was selected for inclusion in CSI's Pantheon of Skeptics. The Pantheon of Skeptics was created by CSI to remember the legacy of deceased fellows of CSI and their contributions to the cause of scientific skepticism.

Bok continued as an emeritus professor at the University of Arizona, and he participated in or led several groups to view solar eclipses, including a trip to the eclipse near Bratsk in Siberia in July 1981 and his last eclipse trip to what he called his "spiritual home" of Java to view a totality that passed near the town of Salatiga in June 1983.

Bok died of a heart attack at his home in Tucson, Arizona a little more than a month after that final trip. His body was bequeathed to the college of medicine at the University of Arizona.

== Honors ==
Honorary appointments

- Vice-president of the International Astronomical Union (1970–74)
- President of the American Astronomical Society (1972–74)
- Elected to the US National Academy of Sciences (1968)
- Honorary Member of the Royal Astronomical Society of Canada
- Honorary Member of the Astronomical Society of Australia
- Honorary Member of the Royal Astronomical Society of New Zealand
- Corresponding member of the Royal Netherlands Academy of Arts and Sciences
- Associate Fellow of the Royal Astronomical Society, London

Awards

- Adion medal (1971) from Association pour le Développement International de l'Observatoire de Nice in France
- Jansky Prize (1972) awarded by the National Radio Astronomy Observatory "to recognize outstanding contributions to the advancement of radio astronomy."
- Knight in the Order of Orange-Nassau
- Catherine de Wolfe Bruce Medal of the Astronomical Society of the Pacific (1977)
- Henry Norris Russell Lectureship (1982) awarded by the American Astronomical Society in recognition of a lifetime of excellence in astronomical research.
- Klumpke-Roberts Award (1982) awarded by the Astronomical Society of the Pacific to recognize outstanding contributions to the public understanding and appreciation of astronomy.

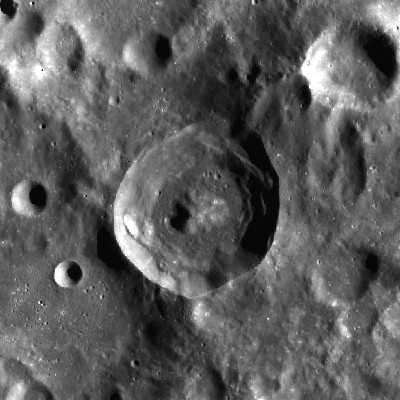
Bok crater on the Moon

Named after him

- Lunar crater Bok (jointly with his wife Priscilla) – a 43-km diameter crater on the far side of the Moon
- Asteroid 1983 Bok (jointly with his wife Priscilla) – discovered by Elizabeth Roemer in 1975. (Note: For (1983) Bok, the naming citation reads in part: "This is the first minor planet discovered with the 229-cm telescope of the Stewart Observatory to be numbered. It is named for the Boks in recognition of their role in bringing the large reflector of the Steward Observatory into operation and for their support of the astrometric work on comets, minor planets, and satellites. This minor planet was at far southern declination at discovery (and observations at Wellington were important in obtaining a reliable orbit). This is also in fitting association with the Boks, who have devoted much effort to study of the structure of the southern Milky Way and to encouragement of astronomy in the Southern Hemisphere.")
- Bok globules
- Bok Telescope - the Steward Observatory's 90-inch (2.3 m) telescope was named after him in 1996.
- C/1949 N1 - A comet that Bok co-discovered.

Memorial awards

- Bart J Bok Postdoctoral Fellowship, given out by the Astronomy Department of the University of Arizona and Steward Observatory.
- The Bok Prize is awarded annually by the Astronomical Society of Australia since 1989 to recognise outstanding research in astronomy by an Honours student or eligible master's student at an Australian university.
- Another Bok Prize is awarded by the Harvard University's Department of Astronomy since 1958 to recognise research in the area of Milky Way research by observational methods.
- Two Priscilla and Bart Bok Awards are jointly awarded each year by the Astronomical Society of the Pacific and the American Astronomical Society to astronomy-related projects at the Intel International Science and Engineering Fair, in recognition of the Boks' advocacy for astronomy education and work in public outreach.

== Selected publications ==
- Bok, Bart J.; Lindsay, Eric M. (January 1938). "Note on the Stellar Distribution in the Vicinity of a Southern Galactic Window". Proceedings of the National Academy of Sciences of the United States of America. 24 (1): 4–9. Bibcode:1938PNAS...24....4B. doi:10.1073/pnas.24.1.4. ISSN 0027-8424. PMC 1077014. PMID 16588185.
- Bok, BJ; Morgan, HR; Stokley, J (June 1941). "The Distribution of American Astronomical Literature Abroad". Science. 93 (2424): 568–569. Bibcode:1941Sci....93..568B. doi:10.1126/science.93.2424.568. ISSN 0036-8075. PMID 17809700.
- Bok, BJ (September 1944). "Freedom in Science". Science. 100 (2593): 217–218. doi:10.1126/science.100.2593.217-a. ISSN 0036-8075. PMID 17840405. S2CID 56193332.
- Bok, BJ (February 1949). "Science and the Maintenance of Peace". Science. 109 (2824): 131–137. Bibcode:1949Sci...109..131B. doi:10.1126/science.109.2824.131. ISSN 0036-8075. PMID 17759166.
- Bok, BJ (January 1953). "The United Nations Expanded Program for Technical Assistance". Science. 117 (3030): 67–70. Bibcode:1953Sci...117...67B. doi:10.1126/science.117.3030.67. ISSN 0036-8075. PMID 17836270.
- Bok, BJ (June 1955). "Science in International Cooperation". Science. 121 (3155): 843–847. Bibcode:1955Sci...121..843B. doi:10.1126/science.121.3155.843. ISSN 0036-8075. PMID 17798483.
- Bok, BJ (November 1966). "Graduate Training in Astronomy". Science. 154 (3749): 590–592. doi:10.1126/science.154.3749.590-a. ISSN 0036-8075. PMID 17778795. S2CID 2082524.
- Bok, BJ (January 1973). "Galactic spiral structure". American Scientist. 61 (1): 8. ISSN 0003-0996. PMID 17712971.
- Bok, Bart Jan; Bok, Priscilla Fairfield (1981). The Milky Way (5th ed.). Harvard University Press. ISBN 978-0-674-57503-5.
- Bok's ADS record.
