= Elizabeth Roemer =

American astronomer (1929–2016)

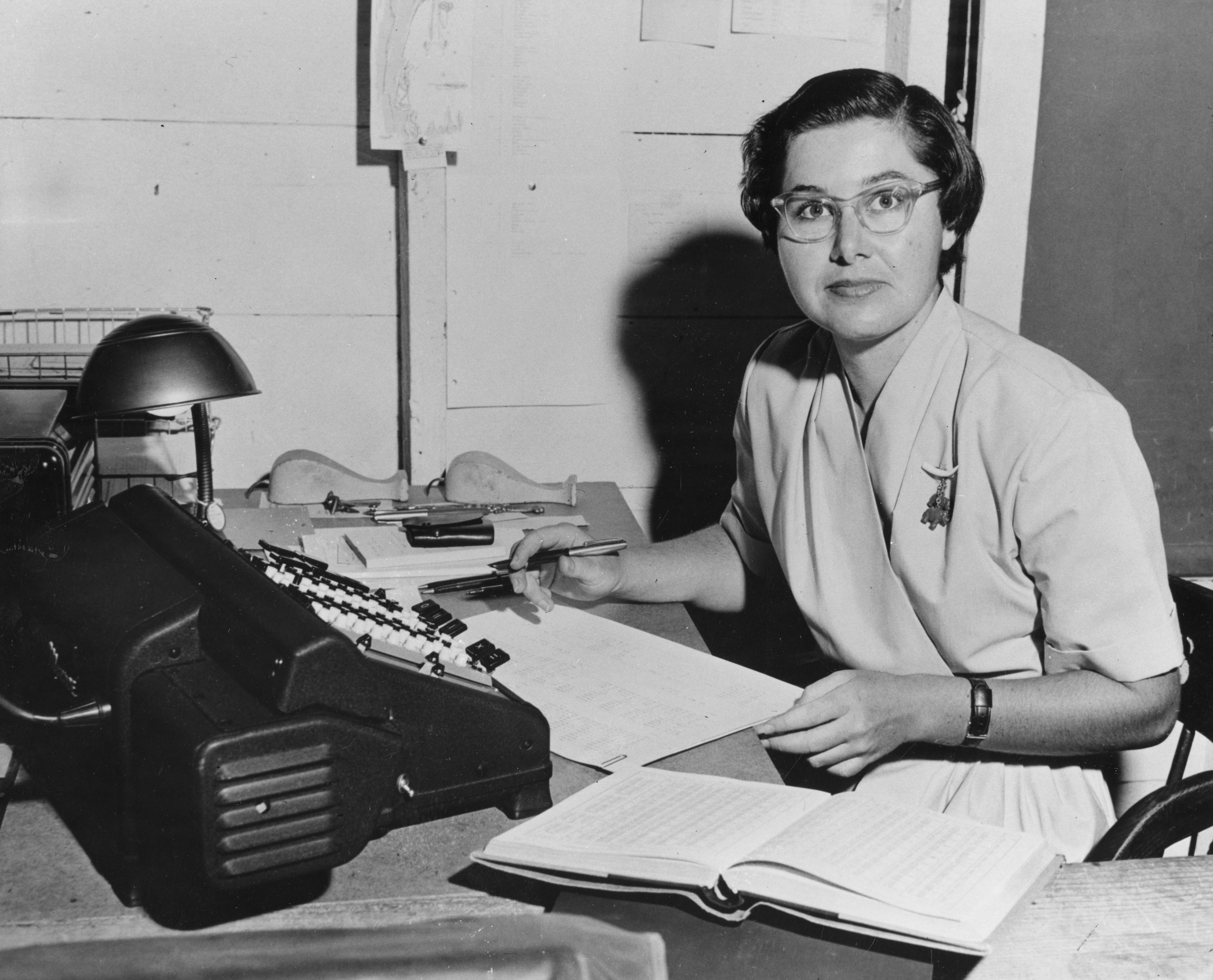
Elizabeth Roemer

Elizabeth "Pat" Roemer (September 4, 1929 – April 8, 2016) was an American astronomer and educator who specialized in astronomy with a particular focus on comets and minor planets. She was well known for the recovery of lost comets, as well as for her discovery of two asteroids, the co-discovery of Jupiter's moon Themisto, and for the asteroid 1657 Roemera that was named in her honor.

== Life ==
Roemer was born on September 4, 1929, in Oakland, California, and was raised in Alameda, California, by her father and mother, Richard Quirin and Elsie B. Roemer. From a young age, Roemer expressed interest in scientific reasoning and matters regarding astronomy. It was revealed by Roemer in an interview that while she was a freshman in high school many of her teachers lacked the proper qualifications. This was because she was a student during the Second World War, when many individuals were teaching on emergency credentials. One of her general science teachers had made remarks with astronomical implications that Roemer believed to be incorrect. One of these statements was that Polaris was the largest star. Despite not having books or sources that contained the correct answers, Roemer was encouraged to look for the right answers elsewhere. She got in touch with a teaching assistant in the Astronomy Department at Berkeley who helped her find the information she was looking for. This marked the beginning of her interest in other aspects of astronomy.

Roemer graduated valedictorian of her high school class in 1946, and in that same year she won the National Westinghouse Science Talent Search. She became a serious amateur astronomer and was determined to pursue her interest in comets and asteroids. In 1950 she graduated from the University of California, Berkeley with a BA in astronomy. She graduated with honors as a Bertha Dolbeer Scholar. During her graduate studies at Berkeley, Roemer taught adult extension classes in Oakland to finance her tuition from 1950 to 1952. This was the experience that allowed her to develop a passion for teaching. From 1954 to 1955, she worked as an assistant astronomer and lab technician at UC's Lick Observatory, and in 1955 she earned her PhD from Berkeley.

After receiving her PhD, Roemer continued her time at UC as an assistant astronomer and conducted research at the University of Chicago's Yerkes Observatory. Roemer received the title of astronomer in 1957 at the US Naval Observatory in Flagstaff, Arizona. She began to gain traction for rediscovering comets by using a high definition 40-inch reflecting telescope to photograph and analyze nuclei. Her groundbreaking research led to the recovery of dozens of short period comets–comets that take less than 20 years to orbit the Sun. Scientists at the time did not have methods or equipment that could easily track short period comets around the Sun, and these comets would become “lost” once the distance became too great. Roemer found these lost comets by searching the area they were predicted to be as they rounded the Sun and detected faint movement relative to surrounding stars. This was no simple feat, as predicting the position and brightness of the comet was extremely difficult, especially for comets that had been missing for extended periods of time. Roemer's data and measurements of the brightness of these recovered comets at large distances has aided astronomers of her time and allowed for the tracking of many short period comets around the Sun until this day.

In 1965, she became the acting director at the US Naval Observatory. She was then hired by the University of Arizona in Tucson as an associate professor in the lunar and planetary laboratory in 1966, and promoted to full professor by 1969. In addition, she was asked to chair the committee that would set up UA's Department of Planetary Sciences in 1972. In 1980, while still a UA professor, she served as an astronomer at Tucson's Steward Observatory. She served at the observatory until 1997. Roemer finally retired in 1998 but continued her research on comets and asteroids as astronomer and professor emerita. On April 8, 2016, Roemer died in Tucson, Arizona.

== International Astronomical Union ==
Roemer was noted as an exemplary member of the astronomy community and served on many astronomical commissions and organizations. She held various positions throughout the years, including president and vice-president of the International Astronomical Union's Commission 6 and Commission 20.

== Major accomplishments ==
In 1961, asteroid 1657 Roemera was named in her honor. She discovered the asteroid 1930 Lucifer on October 29, 1964, and the asteroid 1983 Bok on June 9, 1975. She also co-discovered Jupiter's moon Themisto with Charles T. Kowal in 1975. Themisto was lost soon after its discovery because it is an irregular moon of Jupiter. However, it was finally recovered in 2000. Throughout her career, Roemer detected the return of 79 periodic comets and computed the orbits of numerous comets and minor planets.

== Awards and recognition ==
Roemer received several awards and recognitions in the course of her lifetime and professional career. She was a recipient of the BA Gould Prize of the National Academy of Sciences, the NASA Special Award, and the Donohoe Lectureship of the Astronomical Society of the Pacific. In 1960, Mademoiselle Magazine honored her work with comets and named her one of its Ten Young Women of the Year. Roemer expressed her hope that her Mademoiselle Merit Award would encourage others to explore the field of astronomy in a letter to the manager of Women's News for Westinghouse.

== Death and legacy ==
Elizabeth Roemer was an active member of the astronomy community until her death in 2016. She became a member of the Friends of Lowell Observatory in 2006, as well as a member of the Percival Lowell Society. Before dying, she made a donation that created what is known as the Elizabeth Roemer Foundation Donation. The money was used to create an instrumentation fund in the Lowell Observatory Foundation, supporting the acquisition, development, maintenance of, and access to improved technologies and materials within the observatory's facilities. Her support created safe and effective organization and operation of the observatory's equipment and technology.
